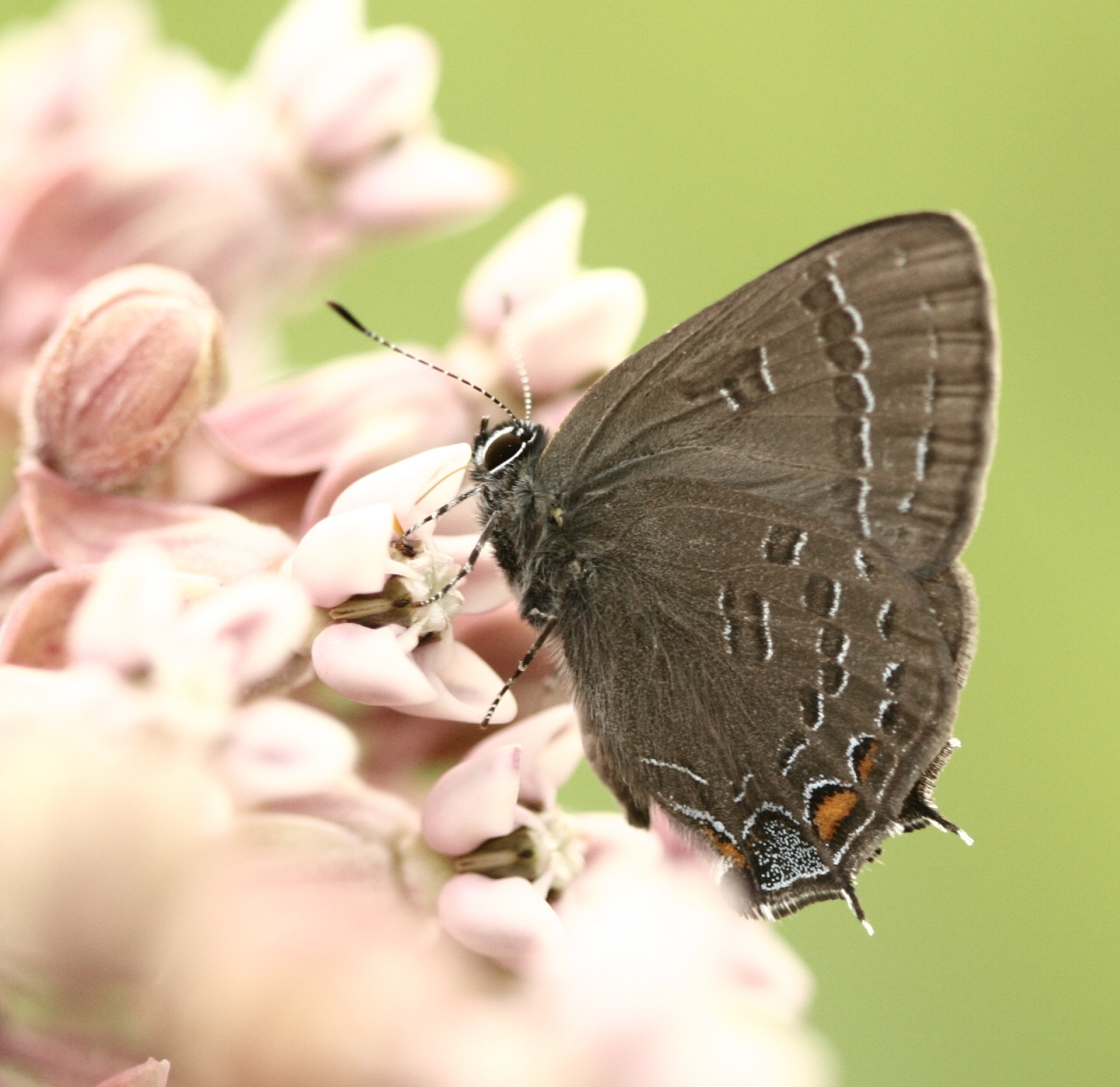

Conservation status
- Secure (NatureServe)

Scientific classification
- Kingdom: Animalia
- Phylum: Arthropoda
- Clade: Pancrustacea
- Class: Insecta
- Order: Lepidoptera
- Family: Lycaenidae
- Genus: Satyrium
- Species: S. calanus

Binomial name
- Satyrium calanus (Hübner, [1809])

Subspecies
- Four, see text
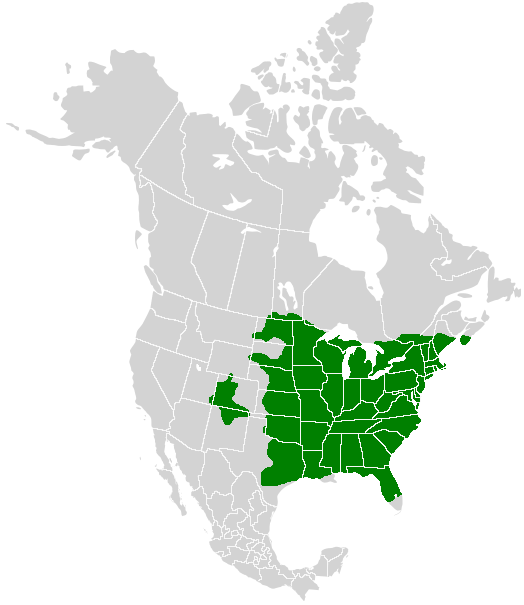

Synonyms
- Rusticus calanus Hübner, [1809]; Thecla calanus Dyar, 1903

= Satyrium calanus =

Banded hairstreak

Species of butterfly

Satyrium calanus, the banded hairstreak, is a butterfly in the family Lycaenidae.

== Appearance, behavior, and distribution ==
The banded hairstreak is a common hairstreak east of the Rocky Mountains in North America. It is a territorial butterfly that will challenge other butterflies invading its territory.

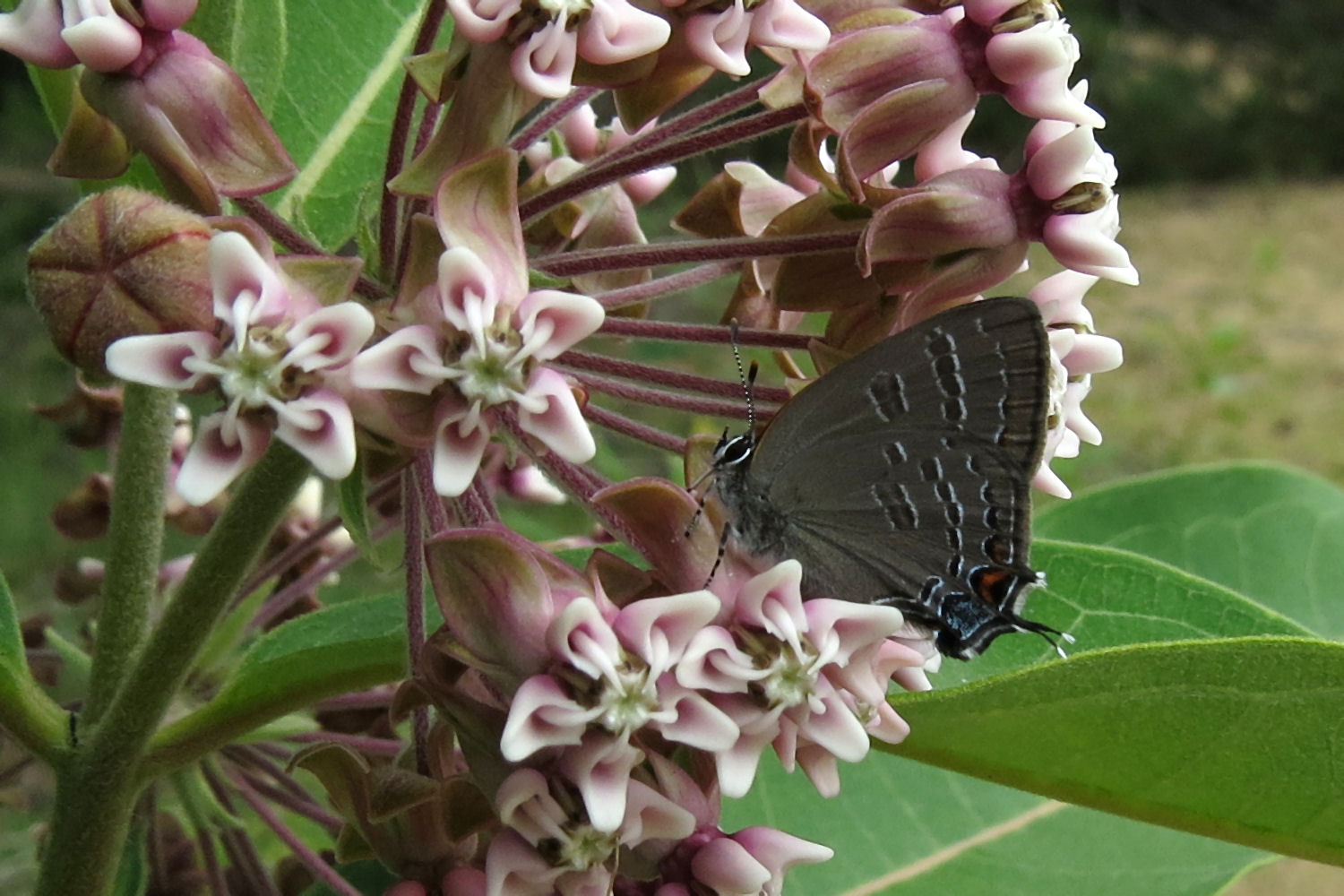
S. c. falacer on common milkweed, Ontario, Canada

== Subspecies ==
Listed alphabetically:

- S. c. albidus Scott, 1981
- S. c. calanus
- S. c. falacer (Godart, [1824])
- S. c. godarti (Field, 1938)

== Life cycle ==
Eggs are laid singly on the host plants and hatch in the spring. There is a single brood that flies early June to late August.

== Host plants ==
Host plants include oak, hickory, and walnut (especially butternut).

== Similar species ==
- Edwards' hairstreak (S. edwardsii)
- Hickory hairstreak (S. caryaevorum)
