= Satyrium herzi =

- 73d in Adalbert Seitz' Die Großschmetterlinge der Erde

Scientific classification
- Kingdom: Animalia
- Phylum: Arthropoda
- Clade: Pancrustacea
- Class: Insecta
- Order: Lepidoptera
- Family: Lycaenidae
- Genus: Satyrium
- Species: S. herzi

Binomial name
- Satyrium herzi (Fixsen, 1887)

Synonyms
- Thecla herzi Fixsen, 1887; Strymon herzi; Fixsenia herzi

Species of butterfly

Satyrium herzi is a butterfly of the subfamily Lycaeninae. It was described by Johann Heinrich Fixsen in 1887. It is found in the Russian Far East (Amur, Ussuri), north-eastern China and Korea.

The larvae feed on Malus mandschurica, Malus baccata and Malus pallasiana.

== Description from Seitz ==
T. herzi Fixs. (= phellodendri Stgr. i. I.) (73d). Hindwing tailless, two teeth above the anal angle. Upperside unicolorous, the male with a pale scent-spot. Underside traversed by two rows of black-centred ocelli, there being a similar spot at the apex of the cell. Hindwing beneath with small red anal band. Fixsen has proposed the names ab. fulva and ab. fulvofenestrata for specimens with a more or less large futvo- yellow discal patch on the forewing. — Amurland, Corea. Larva velvety, uniformly dark green, beneath more bluish green, with the head glossy black. In June adult on Pyrus. Pupa light green, with a brownish violet saddle-spot (Graeser). The butterfly appears in July, flying particularly about the twigs of Phellodendron amurense.
