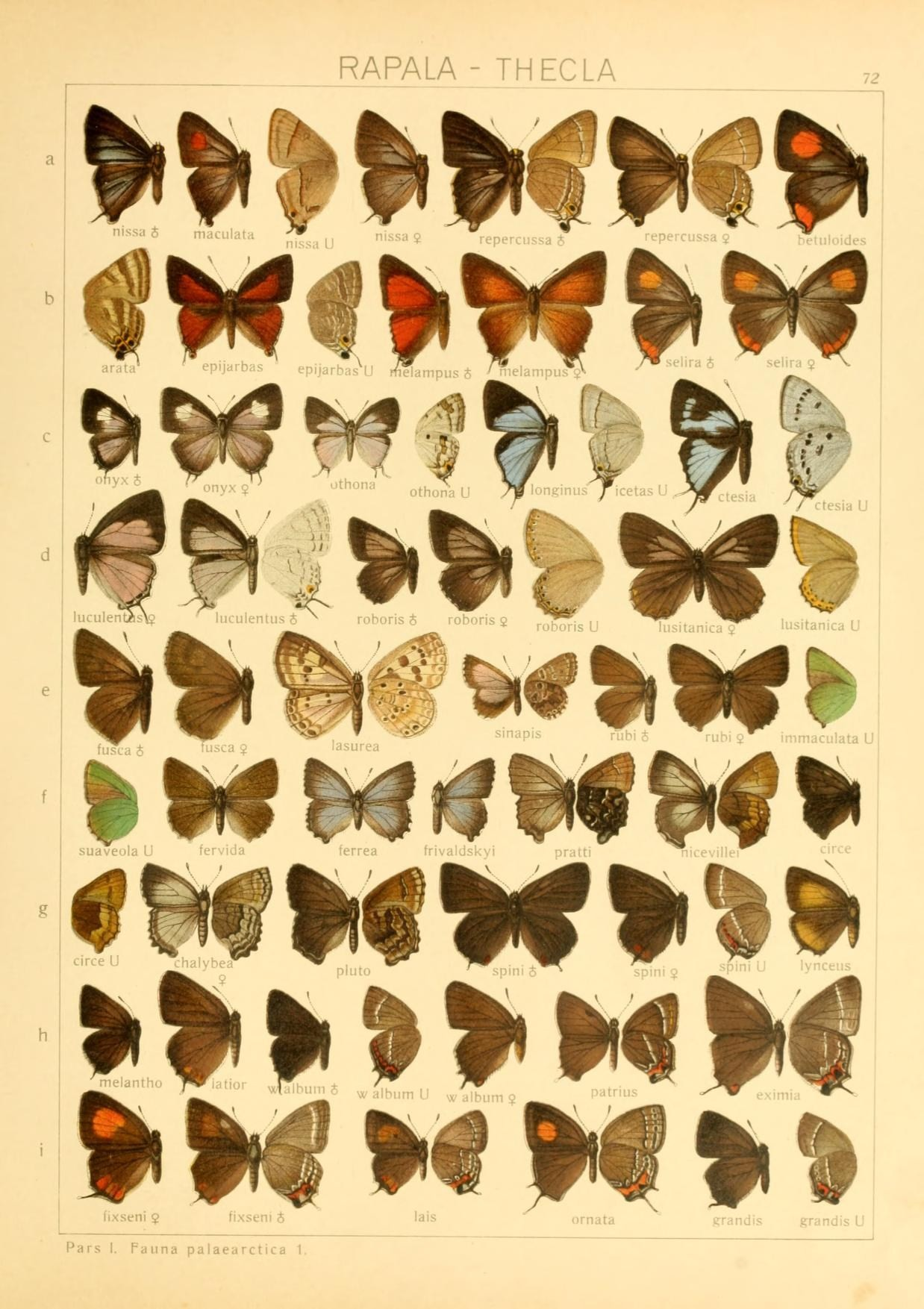
- 72h in Adalbert Seitz' Die Großschmetterlinge der Erde

Scientific classification
- Domain: Eukaryota
- Kingdom: Animalia
- Phylum: Arthropoda
- Class: Insecta
- Order: Lepidoptera
- Family: Lycaenidae
- Genus: Satyrium
- Species: S. latior

Binomial name
- Satyrium latior (Fixsen, 1887)

Synonyms
- Thecla spini var. latior Fixsen, 1887; Tuttiola latior

= Satyrium latior =

Species of butterfly

Satyrium latior is a butterfly of the subfamily Lycaeninae. It was described by Johann Heinrich Fixsen in 1887. It is found in the Russian Far East (Transbaikalia, Amur, Ussuri), northern China and Korea.

The larvae feed on Rhamnus davurica, Rhamnus ussuriensis and Armeniaca sibirica.

== Description from Seitz ==
latior Fixs. (72 h) is one-third larger [than spini], with the colour darker and more intense, the scaling being so dense that the scent-patch of the male is hardly visible; from the Amur, Corea, and North China.
