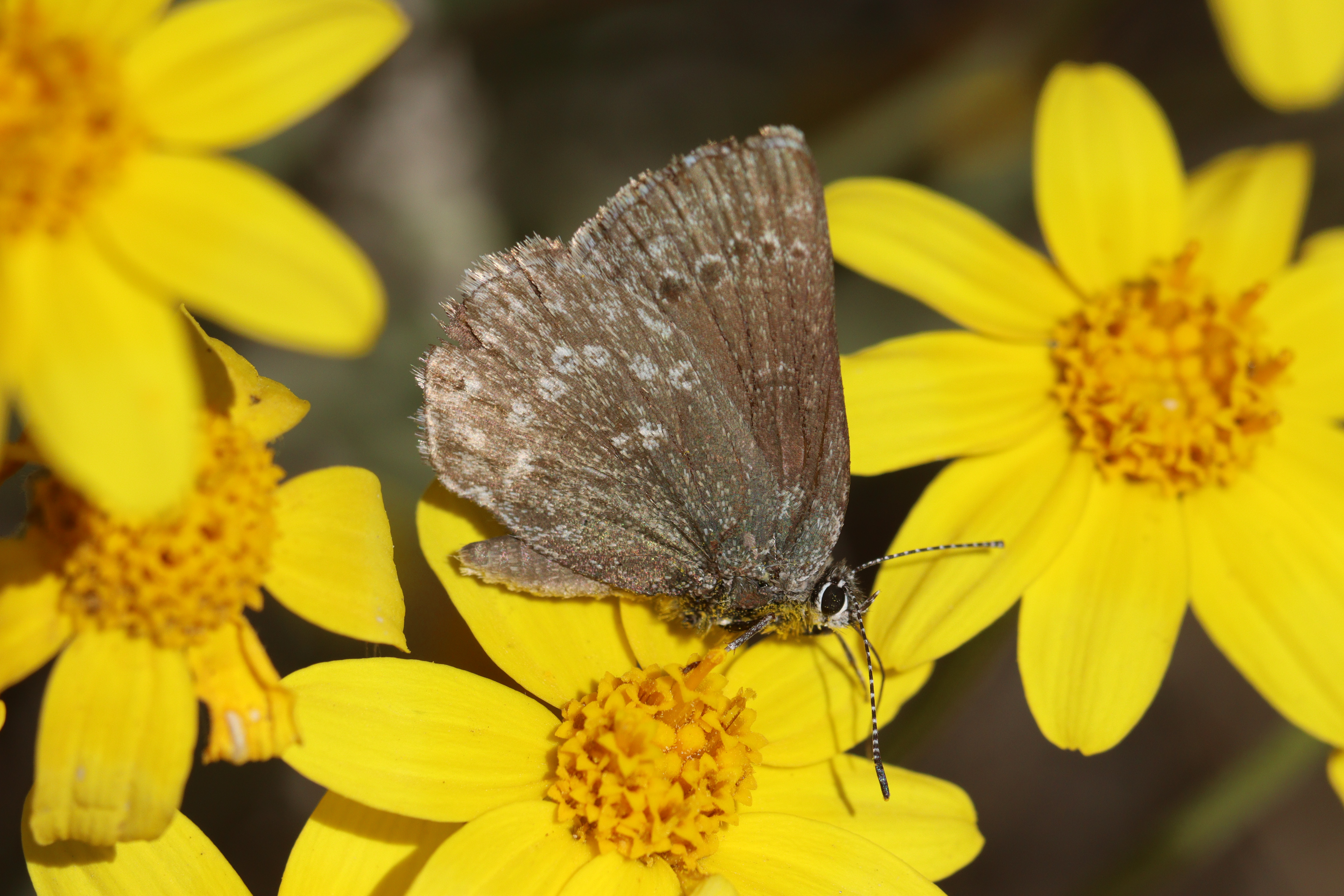
- Satyrium semiluna (female)

Scientific classification
- Domain: Eukaryota
- Kingdom: Animalia
- Phylum: Arthropoda
- Class: Insecta
- Order: Lepidoptera
- Family: Lycaenidae
- Genus: Satyrium
- Species: S. semiluna

Binomial name
- Satyrium semiluna Klots, 1930

= Satyrium semiluna =

Species of butterfly

Satyrium semiluna, known generally as the sagebrush sooty hairstreak or half-moon hairstreak, is a species of hairstreak in the butterfly family Lycaenidae. It is found in North America. The MONA or Hodges number for Satyrium semiluna is 4277.1.

Formerly included in Satyrium fuliginosa, it is similar to the Icaricia icarioides female. The latter species has range, flight-times and host plant overlaps. Unlike the Icaricia icarioides female, Satyrium semiluna lacks blue scales above, white fringe on the wings, and dark cell-end bar on the forward wing. Not present are the one to three basal black dots on the ventral hind wing that the Icaricia icarioides female usually has.

The range of Satyrium semiluna is similar to that Satyrium behrii but does not extend as far south. Satyrium semiluna larvae feed on lupines, e.g., Lupinus sericeus and Lupinus lepidus.

== Subspecies ==
These two subspecies belong to the species Satyrium semiluna:

- Satyrium semiluna maculadistinctum Mattoon & Austin in T. Emmel, 1998
- Satyrium semiluna semiluna Klots, 1930
