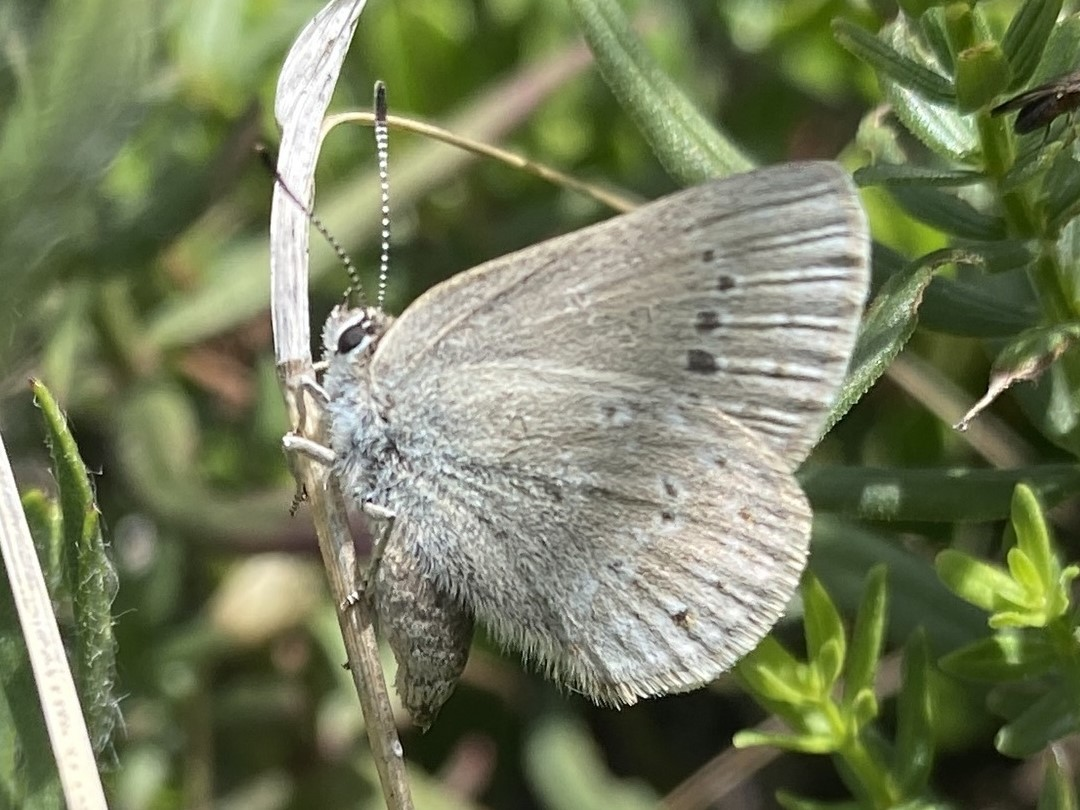

Conservation status
- Critically Imperiled (NatureServe)

- Endangered (COSEWIC)

Scientific classification
- Kingdom: Animalia
- Phylum: Arthropoda
- Clade: Pancrustacea
- Class: Insecta
- Order: Lepidoptera
- Family: Lycaenidae
- Genus: Satyrium
- Species: S. curiosolus

Binomial name
- Satyrium curiosolus MacDonald, Dupuis, Glasier, Sissons, Moehrenschlager, Shaffer & Sperling, 2025

= Satyrium curiosolus =

Species of butterfly

Satyrium curiosolus, also known as curiously isolated hairstreak, is a species of butterfly in the family Lycaenidae that was first described in 2025. It is an isolated species found only on Blakiston Fan in Waterton Lakes National Park, Alberta, Canada. Long considered an isolated population of the half-moon hairstreak, genomic and ecological studies revealed it to be a distinct species that has likely been separated from its closest relatives for more than 40,000 years.

== Taxonomy and systematics ==
The species was formally described in 2025 based on an integrative study combining whole-genome sequencing, ecological niche modeling, and morphological examination. The specific epithet "curiosolus" derives from the Latin curiosus (curious) and solus (alone, isolated).

Historically, the population at Blakiston Fan was classified as the northernmost population of the half-moon hairstreak and was listed as Endangered in Canada under that designation. Genomic analysis revealed it is highly divergent from the nearest S. semiluna populations in British Columbia and Montana, over 400 km away, with no evidence of contemporary or recent gene flow. The study identified 21,985 single nucleotide polymorphisms (SNPs) that are divergently fixed between S. curiosolus and S. semiluna, providing strong genetic diagnostic characters.

== Description ==
Satyrium curiosolus is a small, drab species of butterfly. The dorsal wing surfaces are predominantly brownish or dark brown, lacking any blue tones or tails, similar to many Satyrium species. Males possess a dorsal scent pad of androconial scales. The ventral wing surface is light brown with grey overscaling along the margins and prominent black postmedial spots slightly outlined in white.

Morphologically, it is very similar to S. semiluna. Some experts noted that males from the Blakiston Fan population (S. curiosolus) tend to have a smaller wingspan (<25 mm) and less conspicuous ventral spotting compared to other S. semiluna populations. Confident identification of single specimens without genomic data or precise locality information is difficult.

== Distribution and habitat ==
Satyrium curiosolus is known from a single, highly restricted location: Blakiston Fan, a roughly 300-hectare (740-acre) alluvial fan within Waterton Lakes National Park, Alberta, at an elevation of approximately 1,300 m (4,270 ft). It is more than 400 km (250 mi) from its closest relative, S. semiluna.

The habitat is a short-grass prairie characterized by abundant Lupinus argenteus (silvery lupine), Lupinus sericeus (silky lupine), and Eriogonum flavum (yellow buckwheat). This environment is ecologically distinct from the typical big sagebrush (Artemisia tridentata) steppe habitat occupied by S. semiluna. The site receives nearly twice the summer precipitation of other S. semiluna sites.

== Ecology and life history ==
The life cycle is univoltine. Eggs overwinter and hatch in late April or early May. Larvae develop through four instars, feeding exclusively on the new buds and stems of Lupinus argenteus, even though L. sericeus is present at the site. Larvae exhibit a mutualistic relationship (myrmecophily) with the ant Lasius ponderosae, which grooms and protects them. Larvae pupate in July, often within ant galleries at the base of lupine plants, and adults emerge after about two weeks, with a flight period from July to mid-August.

Adults perch and bask on buckwheat, lupine, and shrubby cinquefoil (Dasiphora fruticosa). Mating can occur at any time of day. Females lay eggs singly or in small clusters in the soil near the base of L. argenteus or near entrances to L. ponderosae nests.

== Conservation ==
Prior to its description as a new species, the population was listed as Endangered in Canada under the Species at Risk Act as the "Waterton population of Satyrium semiluna". The 2022 COSEWIC assessment recommended an uplisting to Critically Endangered due to its extreme isolation, small population size, and low genetic diversity. This status is retained for S. curiosolus.

The population is small, with genomically estimated contemporary effective population size around 500 individuals and annual adult counts estimated between 1,000 and 10,000. Genomic analyses indicate a long history of inbreeding and isolation dating back ~40,000 years, with a very low level of genetic diversity. The species appears to have undergone "genetic purging", where inbreeding has removed deleterious alleles, potentially helping it survive despite low diversity.
