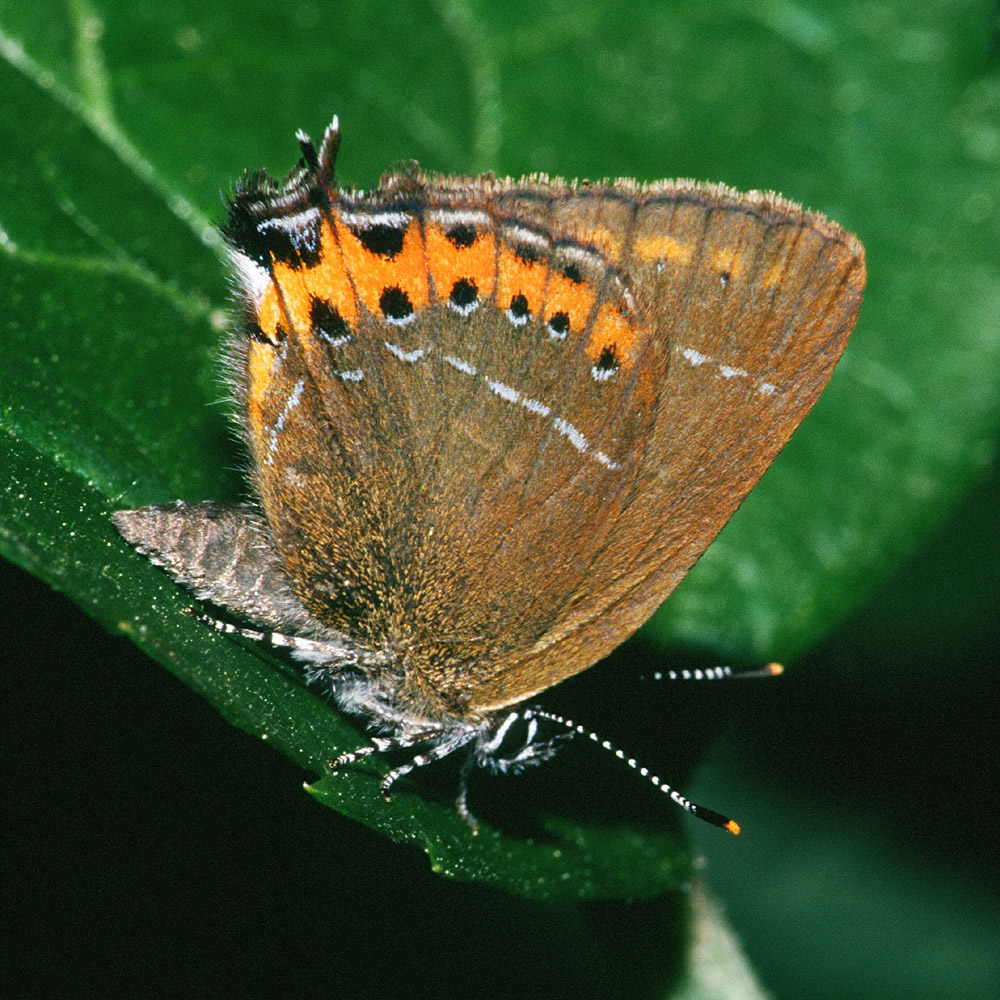
- Satyrium pruni

Scientific classification
- Kingdom: Animalia
- Phylum: Arthropoda
- Class: Insecta
- Order: Lepidoptera
- Family: Lycaenidae
- Tribe: Eumaeini
- Genus: Satyrium; Scudder, 1876

Species
- Numerous, see text

Synonyms
- Chrysophanus Hübner, 1818 (suppressed); Argus Gerhard, 1850 (non Bohadsch, 1761: preoccupied); Callipsyche Scudder, 1876; Neolycaena de Nicéville, 1890; Bakeriia Tutt, 1907 (non Kieffer, 1905: preoccupied); Edwardsia Tutt, 1907 (non Costa, 1838: preoccupied); Erschoffia Tutt, 1907 (non Swinhoe, 1900: preoccupied); Fixsenia Tutt, 1907; Felderia Tutt, 1907 (non Walsingham, 1887: preoccupied); Klugia Tutt, 1907 (non Robineau-Desvoidy, 1863: preoccupied); Kollaria Tutt, 1907 (non Pictet, 1841: preoccupied); Leechia Tutt, 1907 (non South, 1901: preoccupied); Nordmannia Tutt, 1907; Chattendenia Tutt, 1908; Strymonidia Tutt, 1908; Superflua Strand, 1910; Thecliolia Strand, 1910; Tuttiola Strand, 1910; Phaeostrymon Clench, 1961; Pseudothecla Strand, 1910; Necovatia Verity, 1951; Euristrymon Clench, 1961; Harkenclenus dos Passos, 1971; Rhymnaria Zhdanko, 1983; Armenia Dublatov & Korshunov, 1984

= Satyrium (butterfly) =

Butterfly genus in family Lycaenidae

The genus Satyrium contains butterflies in the family Lycaenidae. The species of this genus are found in the Holarctic ecozone.

== Species ==
Listed alphabetically within species group.

The Satyrium species group:

- Satyrium acadica (Edwards, 1862) – Behr's hairstreak
- Satyrium alcestis (Edwards, 1871) – soapberry hairstreak
- Satyrium auretorum (Boisduval, 1852) – gold hunter's hairstreak
- Satyrium behrii (Edwards, 1870) – Behr's hairstreak
- Satyrium calanus (Hübner, 1809) – banded hairstreak
- Satyrium californica (Edwards, 1862) – California hairstreak
- Satyrium caryaevorum (McDunnough, 1942) – hickory hairstreak
- Satyrium curiosolus MacDonald, 2025 - curiously isolated hairstreak
- Satyrium edwardsii (Grote and Robinson, 1867) – Edward's hairstreak
- Satyrium fuliginosum (Edwards, 1861) – sooty hairstreak
- Satyrium iyonis (Oxta and Kusunoki, 1957)
- Satyrium kingi (Klots and Clench, 1952) – King's hairstreak
- Satyrium liparops (Boisduval and Leconte, 1833) – striped hairstreak
- Satyrium saepium (Boisduval, 1852) – hedgerow hairstreak
- Satyrium semiluna Klots, 1930 - sagebrush sooty hairstreak or half-moon hairstreak
- Satyrium sylvinus (Boisduval, 1852) – sylvan hairstreak
- Satyrium tetra (Edwards, 1870) – mountain mahogany hairstreak
- Satyrium titus (Fabricius, 1793) – coral hairstreak

The Armenia species group:

- Satyrium hyrcanicum (Riley, 1939) – Hyrcanian hairstreak
- Satyrium ledereri (Boisduval, 1848) – orange banded hairstreak

The Nordmannia species group:

- Satyrium armena (Rebel, 1901) – Rebel's hairstreak Turkey, Russe-Armenia
- Satyrium abdominalis (Gerhard, 1850) – Gerhard's black hairstreak
- Satyrium acaciae (Fabricius, 1787) – sloe hairstreak
- Satyrium esculi (Hübner, 1804) – false ilex hairstreak
- Satyrium eximia (Fixsen, 1887)
- Satyrium favonius (Smith, 1797) – southern hairstreak
- Satyrium guichardi (Higgins, 1965)
- Satyrium herzi (Fixsen, 1887)
- Satyrium ilavia (Beutenmüller, 1899)
- Satyrium ilicis (Esper, 1779) – ilex hairstreak
- Satyrium latior (Fixsen, 1887)
- Satyrium myrtale (Klug, 1834)
- Satyrium polingi (Barnes & Benjamin, 1926)
- Satyrium pruni (Linnaeus, 1758) – black hairstreak
- Satyrium prunoides (Staudinger, 1887)
- Satyrium runides (Zhdanko, 1990)
- Satyrium spini (Schiffermüller, 1775) – blue spot hairstreak
- Satyrium tateishii (Matsumoto, 2006)
- Satyrium thalia (Leech, 1893)
- Satyrium w-album (Knoch, 1782) – white-letter hairstreak

The Superflua species group:

- Satyrium acaudata Staudinger, 1901
- Satyrium deria (Moore, 1865)
- Satyrium goniopterum Lukhtanov, 1995
- Satyrium khowari Charmeux, 2004
- Satyrium lunulata (Erschoff, 1874)
- Satyrium mirabilis (Erschoff, 1874)
- Satyrium persepolis Eckweiler & ten Hagen, 2003
- Satyrium sassanides (Kollar, [1849]) – whiteline hairstreak

Unknown species group:

- Satyrium austrina (Murayama, 1943)
- Satyrium dejeani (Riley, 1939)
- Satyrium esakii (Shirôzu, 1941)
- Satyrium formosana (Matsumura, 1910)
- Satyrium grandis (Felder and Felder, 1862)
- Satyrium inouei (Shirôzu, 1959)
- Satyrium iyonis (Oxta & Kusunoki, 1957)
- Satyrium jebelia Nakamura, 1975
- Satyrium kongmingi Murayama, 1992
- Satyrium kuboi (Chou and Tong, 1994)
- Satyrium lais (Leech, 1892)
- Satyrium mackwoodi (Evans, 1914) – Mackwood's hairstreak
- Satyrium marcidus (Riley, 1921)
- Satyrium mardinus van Oorschot, van den Brink, van Oorschot, 1985
- Satyrium mera (Janson, 1873)
- Satyrium minshanicum Murayama, 1992
- Satyrium neoeximia Murayama, 1992
- Satyrium oenone Leech, [1893]
- Satyrium ornata (Leech, 1890)
- Satyrium patrius (Leech, 1891)
- Satyrium percomis (Leech, 1894)
- Satyrium persimilis (Riley, 1939)
- Satyrium phyllodendri (Elwes, [1882])
- Satyrium pseudopruni Murayama, 1992
- Satyrium redae Bozano, 1993
- Satyrium rubicundula (Leech, 1890)
- Satyrium siguniangshanicum Murayama, 1992
- Satyrium tanakai (Shirôzu, 1942)
- Satyrium v-album (Oberthür, 1886)
- Satyrium watarii (Matsumura, 1927)
- Satyrium xumini Huang, 2001
- Satyrium yangi (Riley, 1939)
- Satyrium volt (Sugiyama, 1993)

== Gallery ==
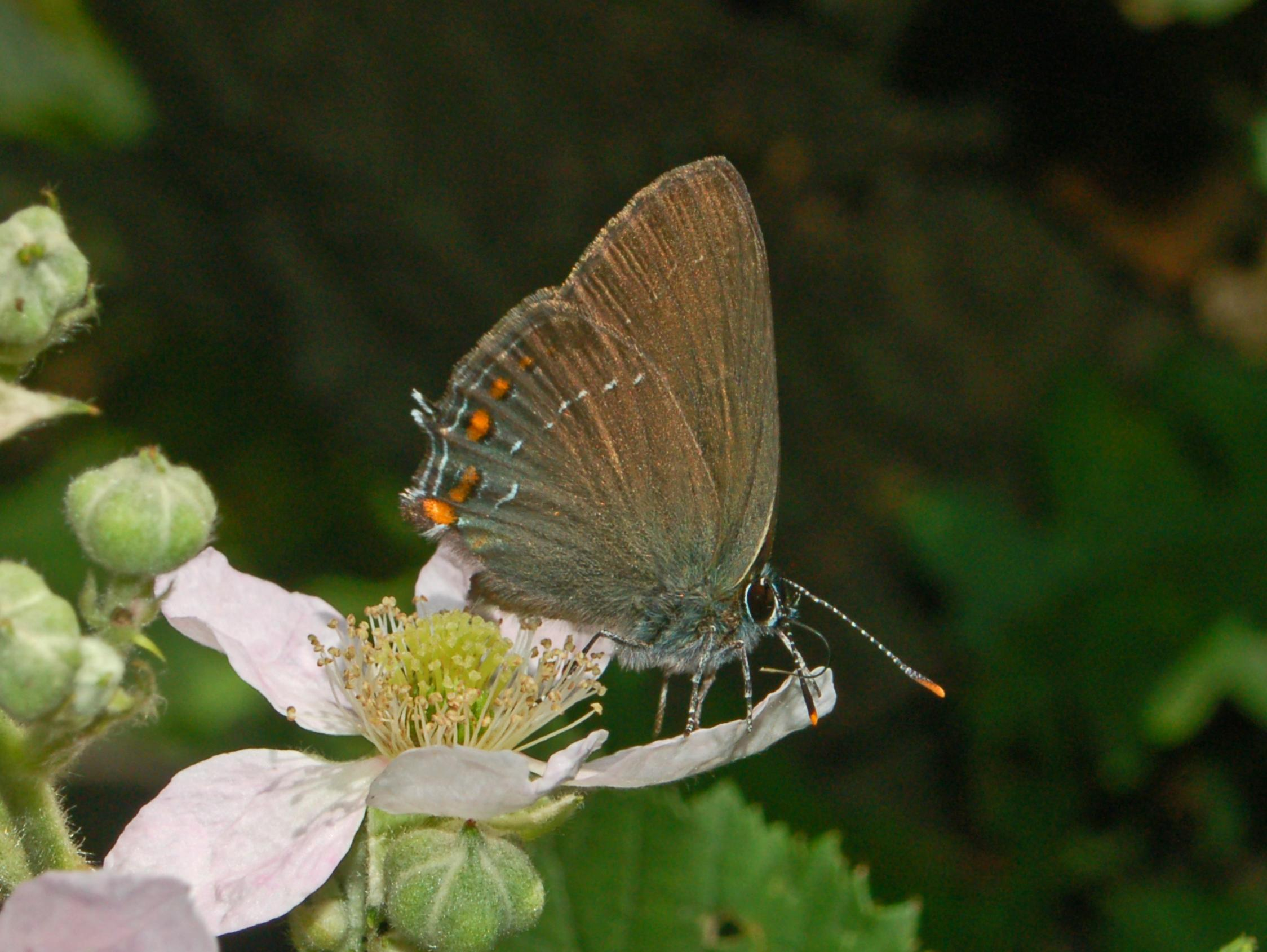
Satyrium ilicis

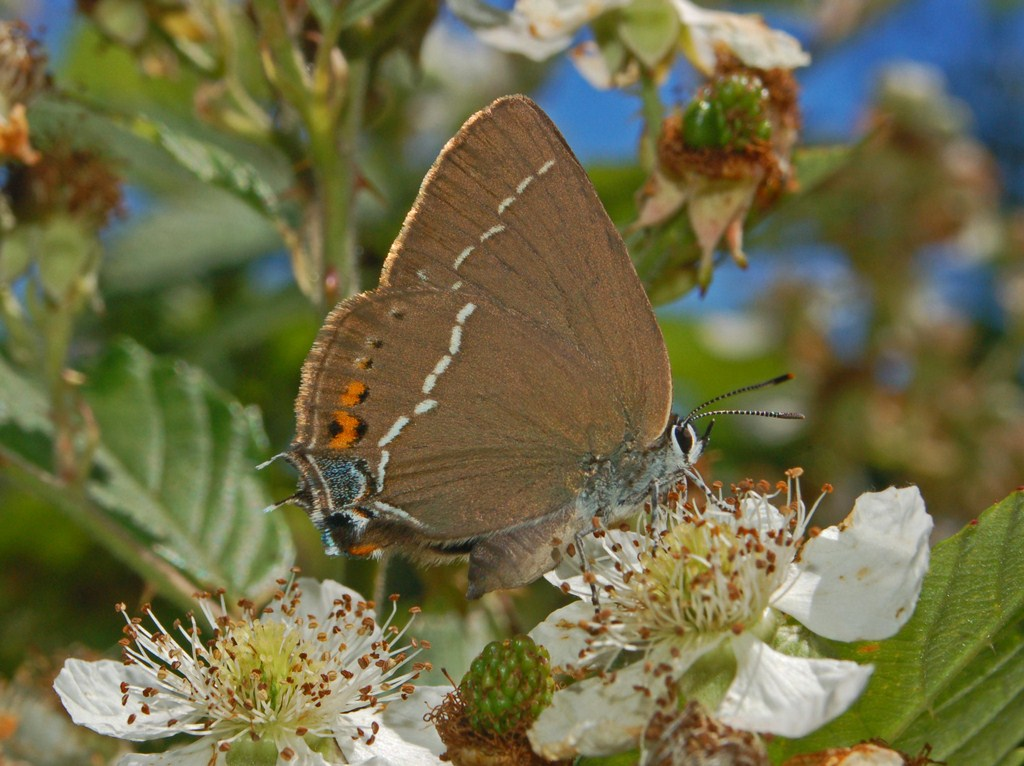
Satyrium spini

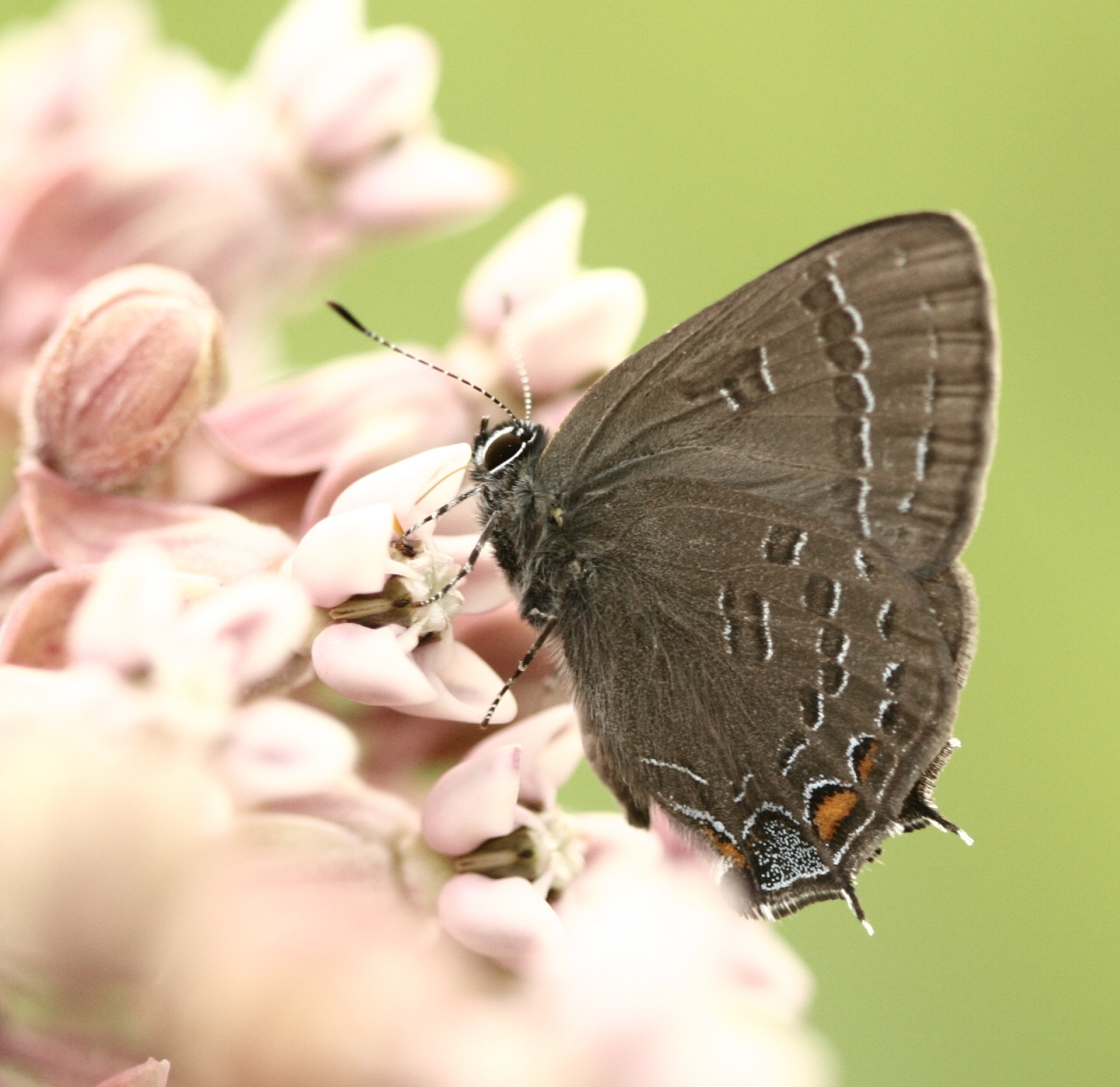
Satyrium calanus

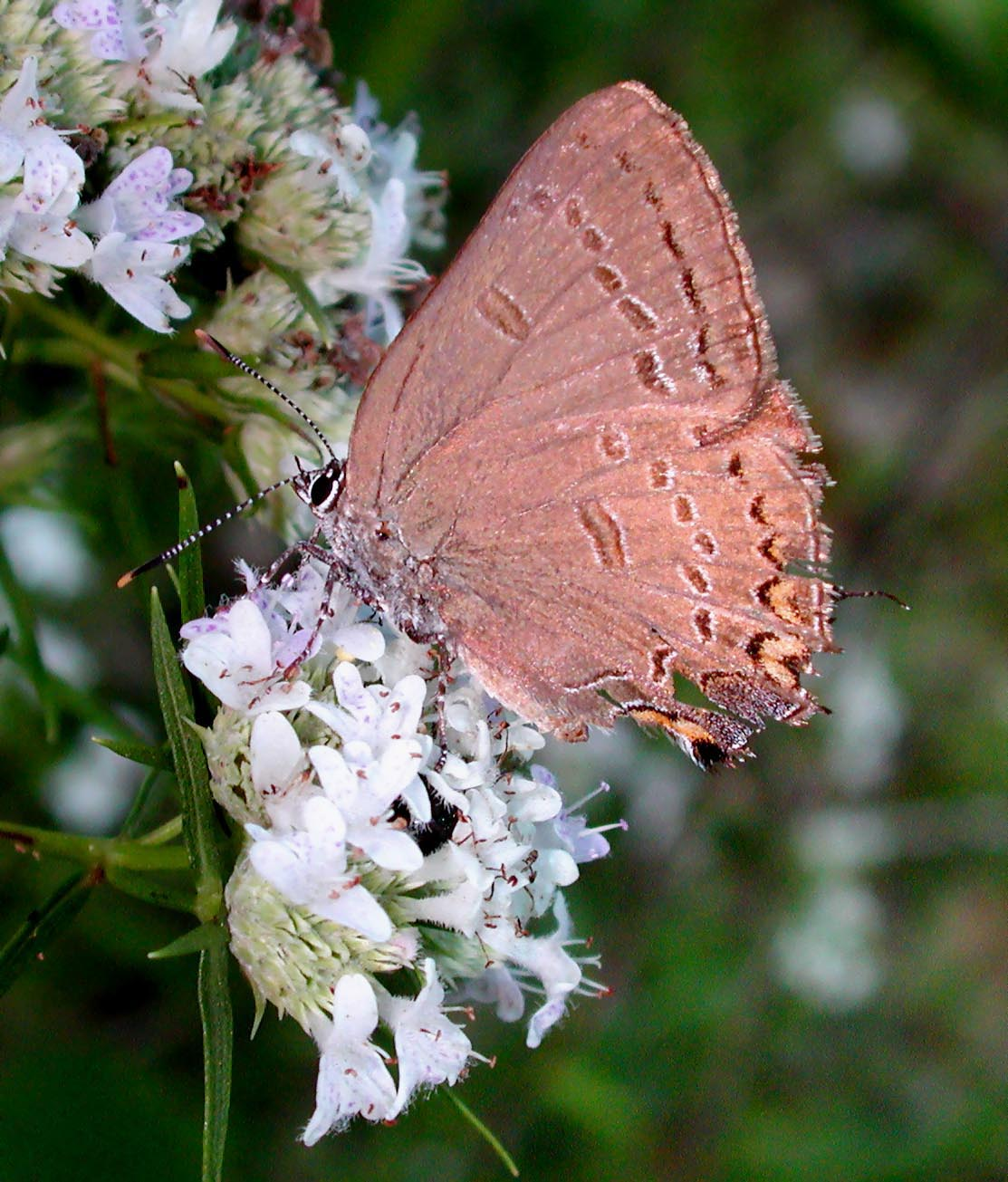
Satyrium edwardsii

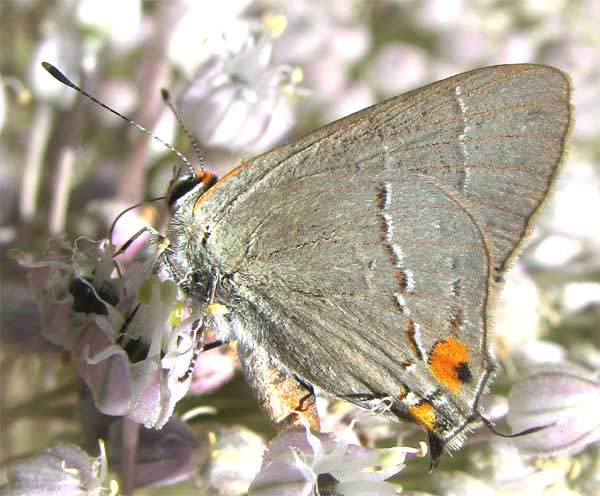
Satyrium favonius

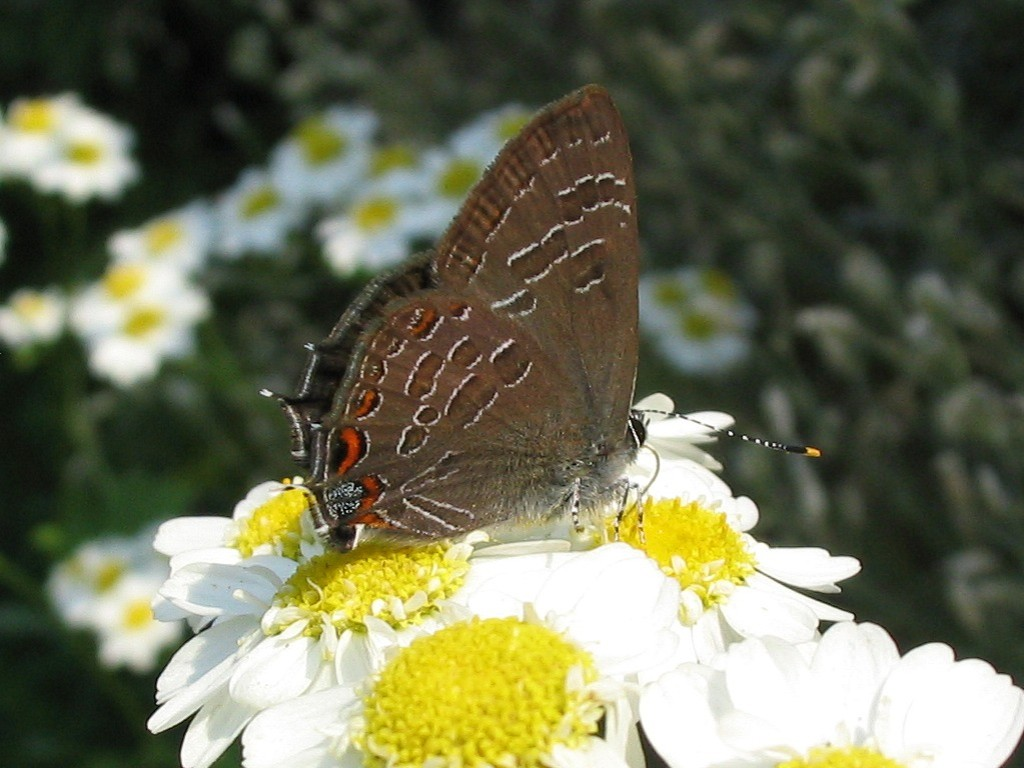
Satyrium liparops

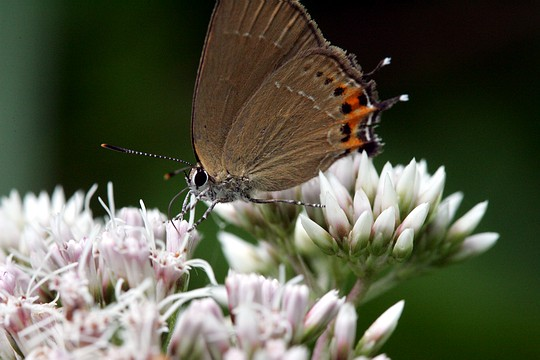
Satyrium mera

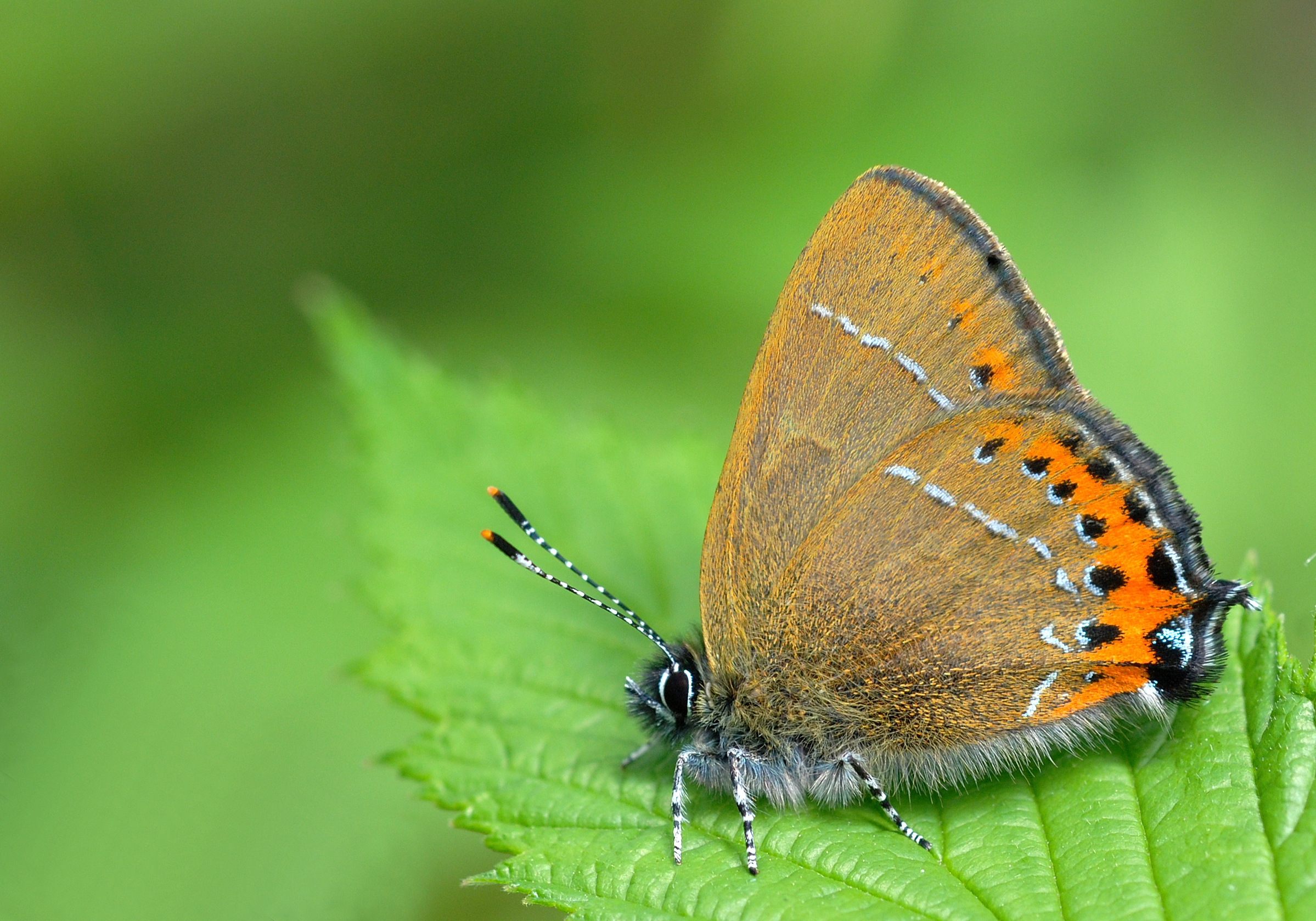
Satyrium pruni

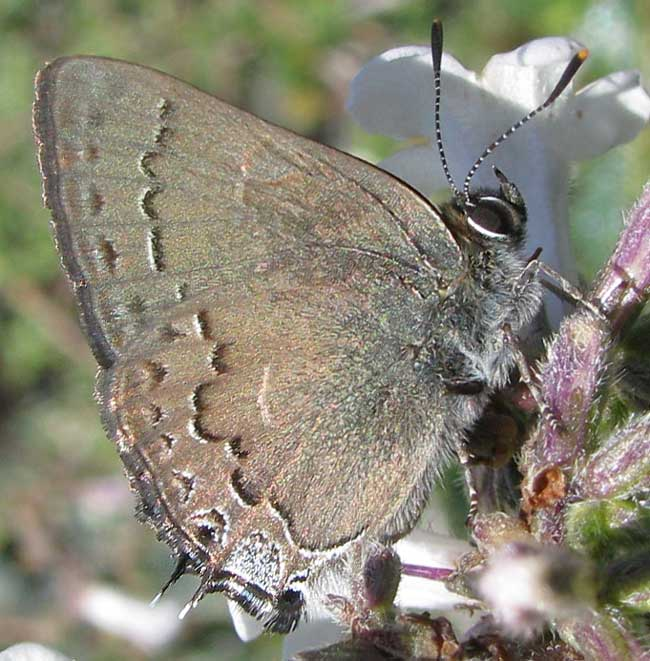
Satyrium saepium

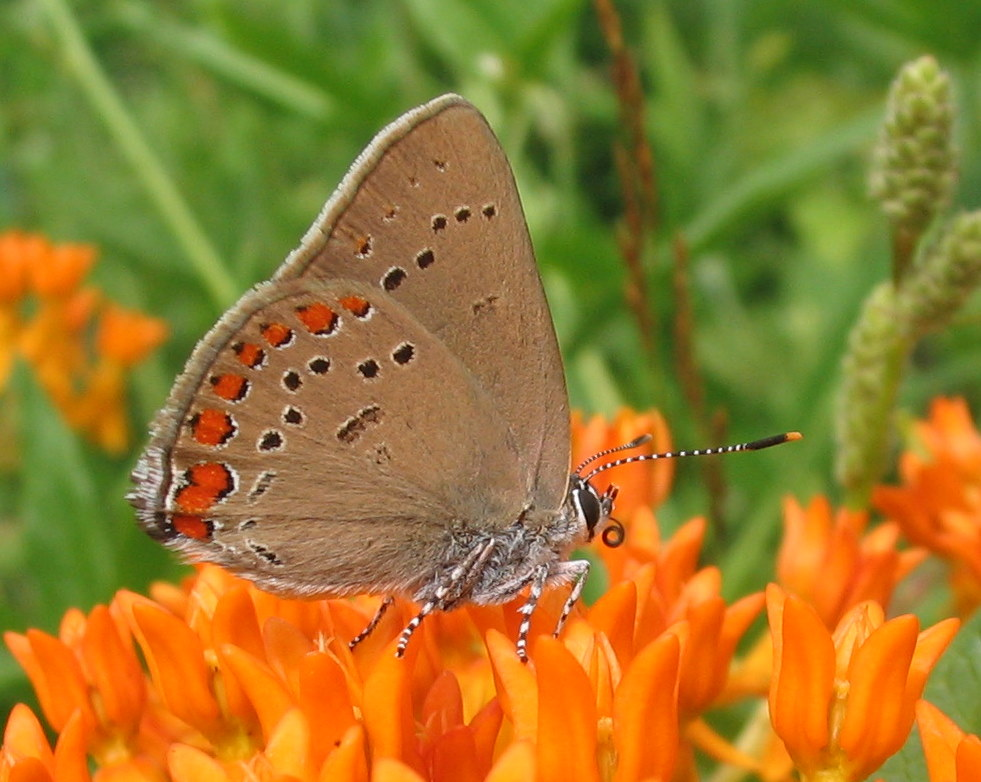
Satyrium titus

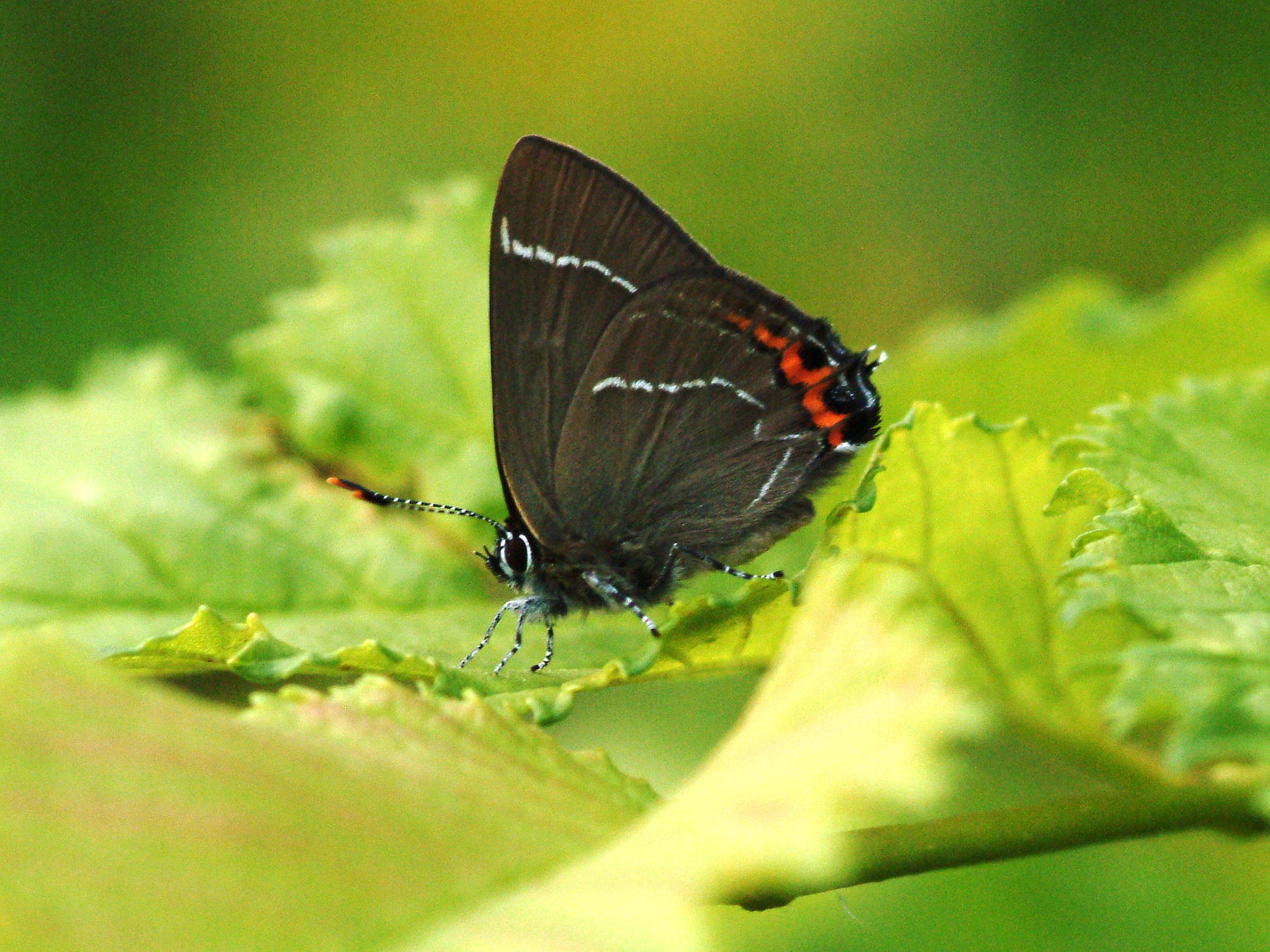
Satyrium w-album
