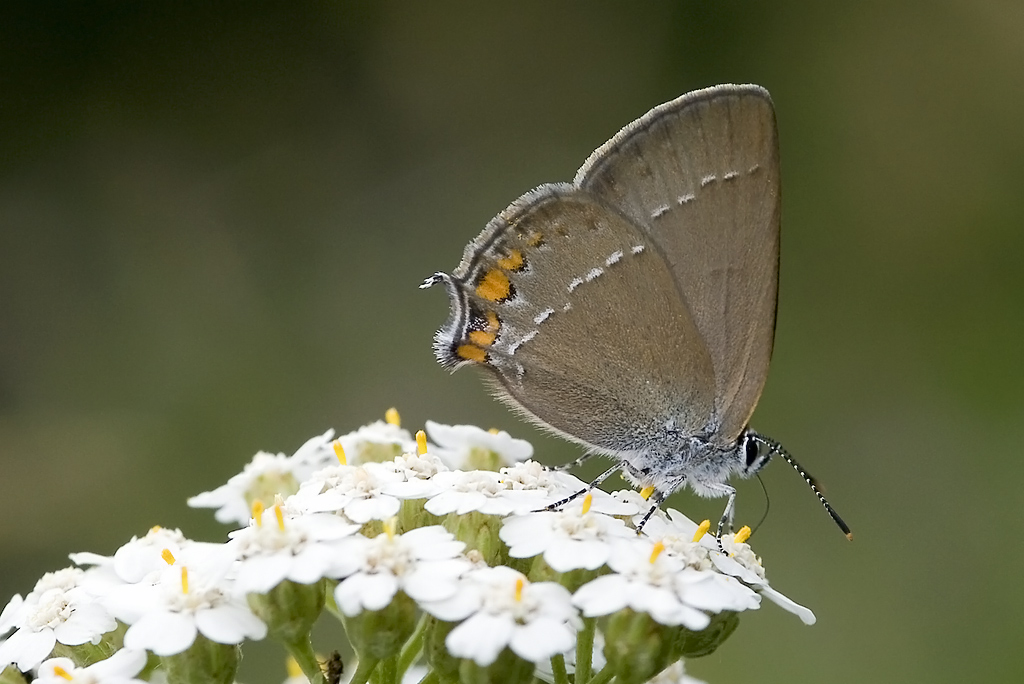

Scientific classification
- Kingdom: Animalia
- Phylum: Arthropoda
- Clade: Pancrustacea
- Class: Insecta
- Order: Lepidoptera
- Family: Lycaenidae
- Genus: Satyrium
- Species: S. acaciae

Binomial name
- Satyrium acaciae (Fabricius, 1787)

= Satyrium acaciae =

Sloe hairstreak

Species of butterfly

Satyrium acaciae, the sloe hairstreak, is a butterfly in the family Lycaenidae.

== Description from Seitz ==
T. acaciae F. (73b). Smaller than true ilicis, hardly so large as esculi. Above uniformly dark brown, the male bearing 1-3, the female 2-5 small red anal spots. The line of white bars on the underside is straighter, being somewhat curved outward at the anal angle of the hindwing without forming a W. Male without scent-spot. Particularly in Central Europe. From South France to Asia Minor and Transcaucasia; also in Spain, if not confounded with esculi; very local and usually rare. — abdominalis Gerh., from the Black Sea countries, is larger and has a grey instead of brown under surface with the white line broader and continuous, the forewing bearing 1-3 dark spots beneath before the hind angle. — gerhardi Stgr. (73 c) is still larger and the hindwing beneath bears blue and black spots with hardly noticeable red edges, instead of a red band. These spots are separated from the edge of the wing by a usually very distinct white marginal line. At Mardin and Aintab. — beccarii Verity, from Florence, is a very small, dwarfed, form; almost tailless, the white line of the underside nearly obsolete. — Larva pale yellowish green or grass-green, with black head, two yellowish subdorsal lines and, further laterad, small pale oblique spots; in May adult on blackthorn, especially small bushes which grow on sunny slopes: the larva can be obtained by beating. The butterflies have very definite haunts which are widely dispersed throughout the distribution area and often of very limited extent; they occur particularly on rocky slopes, with blackthorn hedges and exposed to the full force of the sun, in June, showing a preference for resting on Umbellifers.

== Biology ==
The larva feeds on Prunus spinosa and Prunus divaricata
