= Satyrium ilavia =

Scientific classification
- Domain: Eukaryota
- Kingdom: Animalia
- Phylum: Arthropoda
- Class: Insecta
- Order: Lepidoptera
- Family: Lycaenidae
- Genus: Satyrium
- Species: S. ilavia

Binomial name
- Satyrium ilavia (Beutenmüller, 1899)

Species of butterfly

Satyrium ilavia, the ilavia hairstreak, is a species of hairstreak in the butterfly family Lycaenidae.

The MONA or Hodges number for Satyrium ilavia is 4332.
