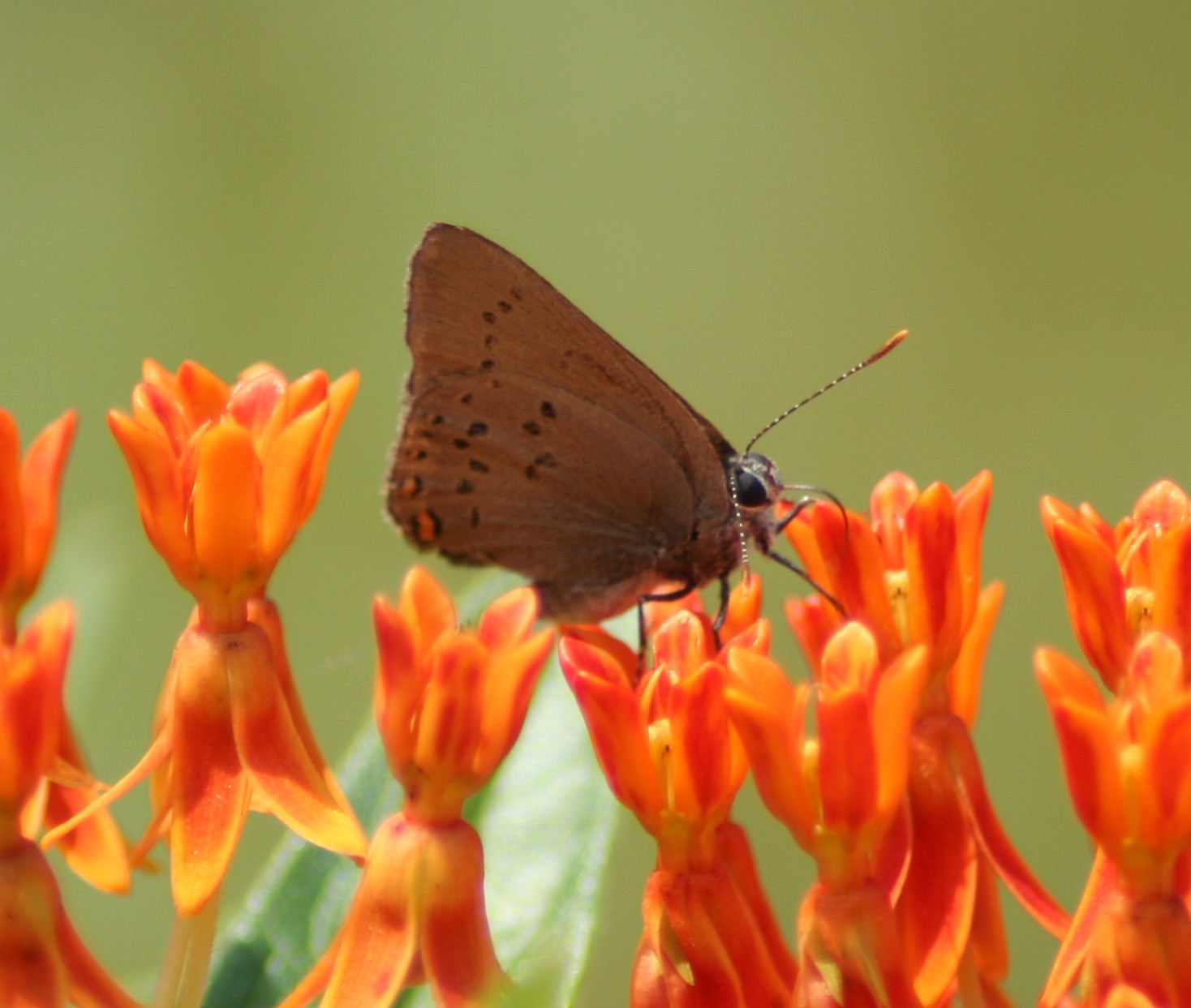
- Nectaring on butterfly weed

Conservation status
- Secure (NatureServe)

Scientific classification
- Domain: Eukaryota
- Kingdom: Animalia
- Phylum: Arthropoda
- Class: Insecta
- Order: Lepidoptera
- Family: Lycaenidae
- Genus: Satyrium
- Species: S. titus

Binomial name
- Satyrium titus (Fabricius, 1793)
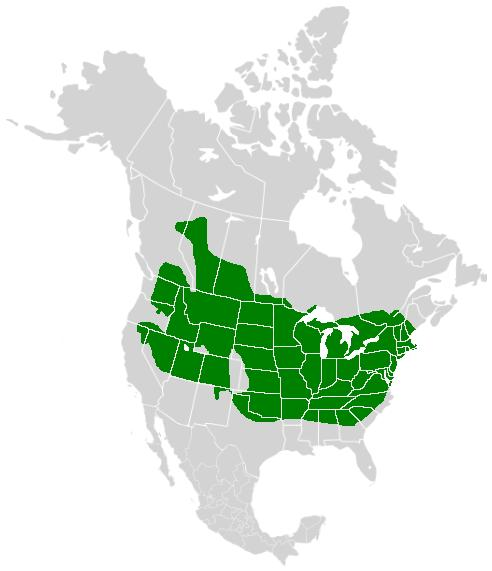

= Satyrium titus =

Coral hairstreak

Species of butterfly

Satyrium titus, the coral hairstreak, is a North American butterfly in the family Lycaenidae.

== Description ==
This tailless hairstreak is brownish gray on the upper side of the wings. The underside of the hindwing has a distinct row of red-orange spots along the outer margin, but lacks the blue spot found in most hairstreaks.

== Habitat ==
This butterfly favors brushy places, thickets, overgrown fields, open woodlands, and streamsides.

== Nectar plants ==
The coral hairstreak is frequently seen visiting butterfly weed, but also uses New Jersey tea, dogbane and sulphur flower as nectar plants.

== Host plants ==
Caterpillars have often been reported on feeding on the fruits of wild plums and cherries (Prunus), and have also been observed on serviceberry (Amelanchier alnifolia) and oaks (Quercus).
