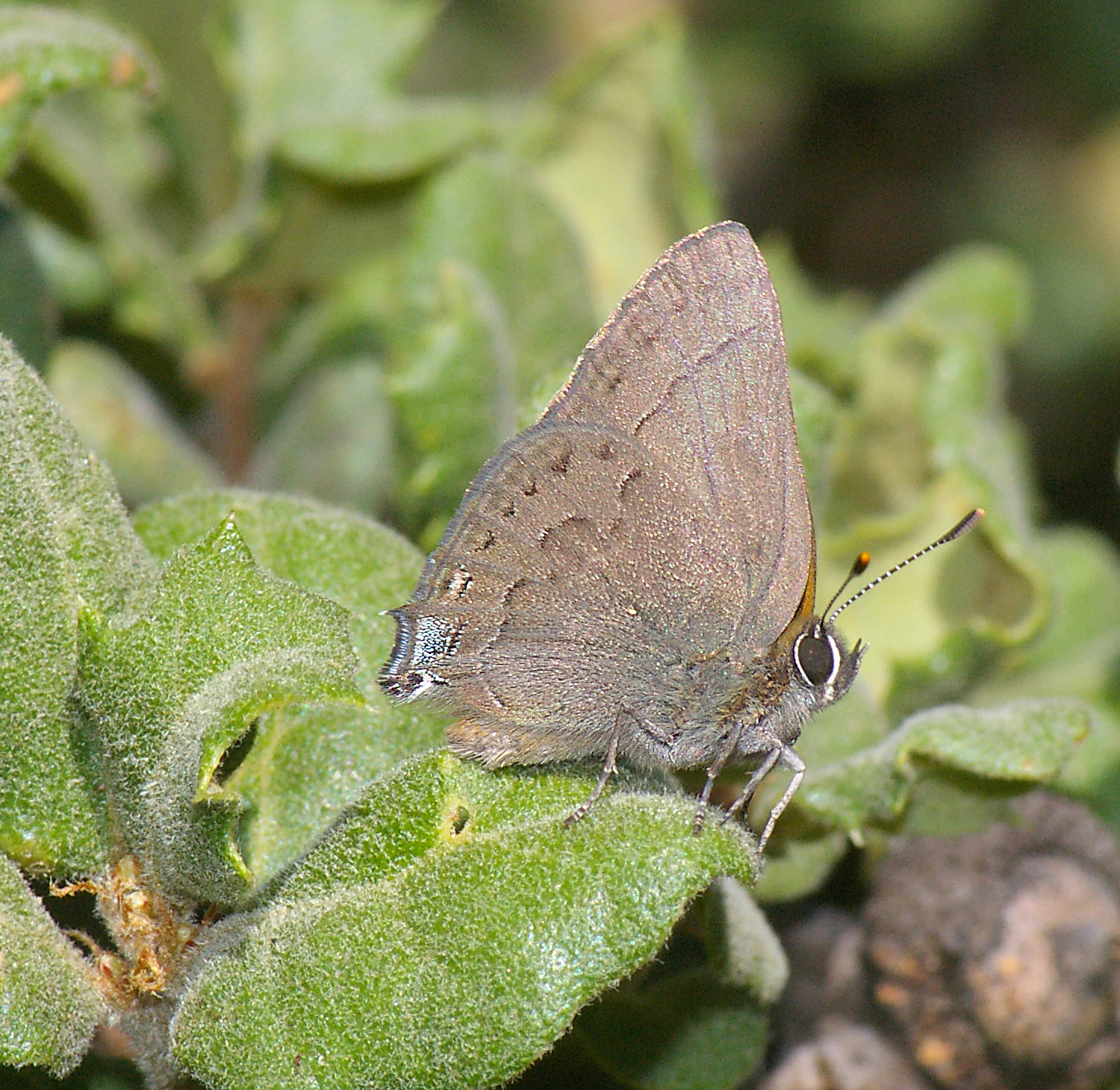

Scientific classification
- Domain: Eukaryota
- Kingdom: Animalia
- Phylum: Arthropoda
- Class: Insecta
- Order: Lepidoptera
- Family: Lycaenidae
- Tribe: Eumaeini
- Genus: Satyrium
- Species: S. tetra

Binomial name
- Satyrium tetra (W. H. Edwards, 1870)

= Satyrium tetra =

Species of butterfly

Satyrium tetra, the mountain mahogany hairstreak, is a species of hairstreak in the butterfly family Lycaenidae.
