= Satyrium prunoides =

- 73d in Adalbert Seitz' Die Großschmetterlinge der Erde

Scientific classification
- Kingdom: Animalia
- Phylum: Arthropoda
- Clade: Pancrustacea
- Class: Insecta
- Order: Lepidoptera
- Family: Lycaenidae
- Genus: Satyrium
- Species: S. prunoides

Binomial name
- Satyrium prunoides (Staudinger, 1887)

Synonyms
- Thecla prunoides Staudinger, 1887; Thecla fulva Fixsen, 1887; Thecla fulvofenestrata Fixsen, 1887

Species of butterfly

Satyrium prunoides is a butterfly of the family Lycaenidae. It was described by Otto Staudinger in 1887. It is found in the Russian Far East (Altai, Sayan, Transbaikalia, Amur, Ussuri), Mongolia, north-eastern China and Korea.

The larvae feed on Spiraea species (including Spiraea media).

== Description from Seitz ==
T. prunoides Stgr. (73 d). Smaller than pruni the male above usually quite unicolorous, without any anal red. The white line on the hindwing beneath more distinct, straighter and at the costa a little nearer the base, male without scent-spot. — from the Altai eastward, in Amurland, Corea and probably also Japan
