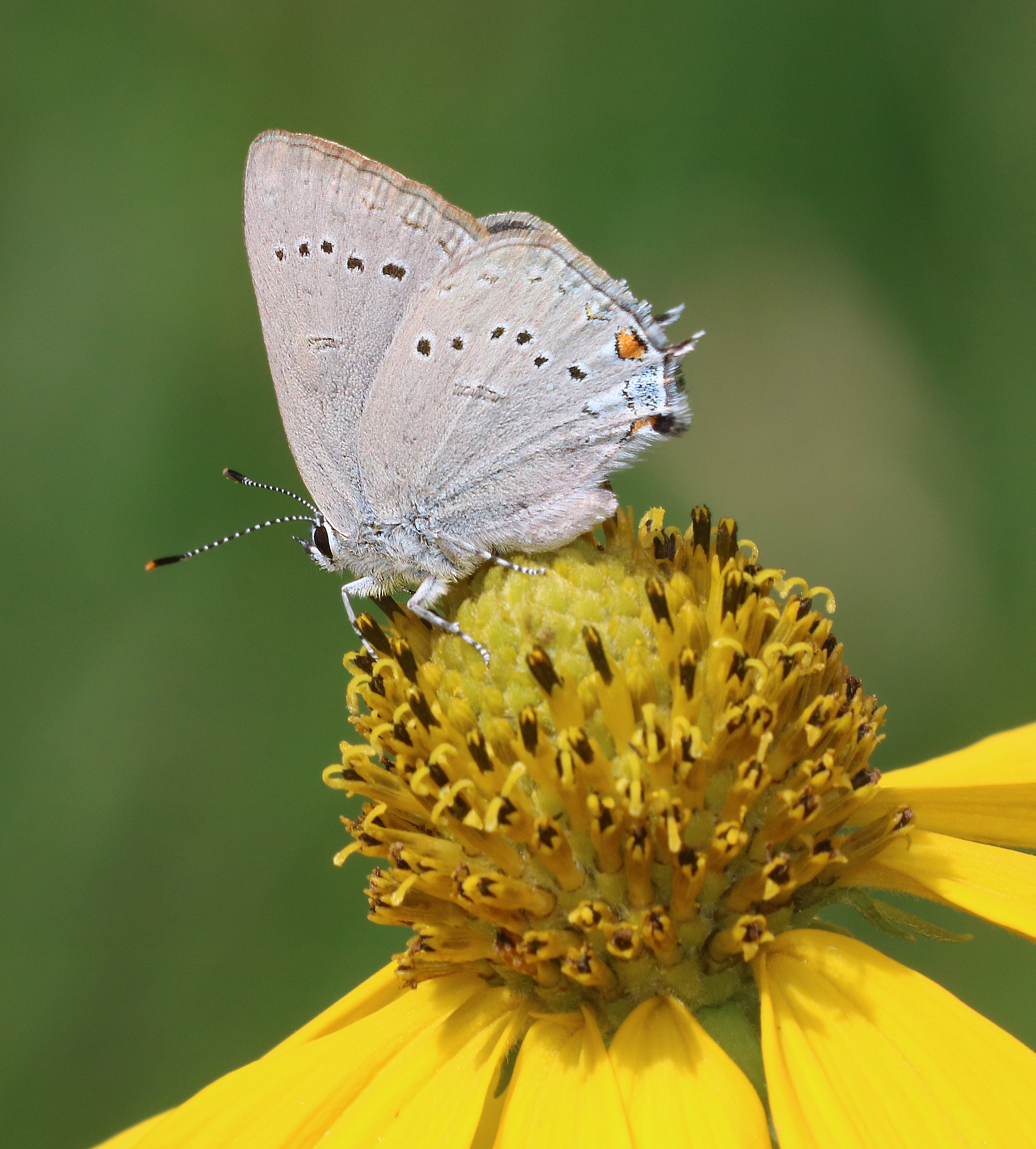

Scientific classification
- Domain: Eukaryota
- Kingdom: Animalia
- Phylum: Arthropoda
- Class: Insecta
- Order: Lepidoptera
- Family: Lycaenidae
- Genus: Satyrium
- Species: S. sylvinus

Binomial name
- Satyrium sylvinus (Boisduval, 1852)

Synonyms
- Thecla sylvinus Boisduval, 1852; Satyrium sylvinum; Thecla dryope Edwards, 1870; Thecla putnami H. Edwards, 1877; Thecla putnami Scudder, 1876; Thecla itys Edwards, 1882; Strymon sylvinus desertorum Grinnell, 1917

= Satyrium sylvinus =

Sylvan hairstreak

Species of insect

The sylvan hairstreak (Satyrium sylvinus) is a butterfly of the family Lycaenidae. It is found in western North America, from British Columbia south-east to Wyoming, Colorado and New Mexico and south through California to Baja California Norte, Mexico.

The wingspan is 25–30 mm.

The larvae feed on the leaves of Salix species. The species overwinters as an egg.

== Subspecies ==
Listed alphabetically.

- S. s. desertorum (Grinnell, 1917) (California)
- S. s. dryope (Edwards, 1870) (California)
- S. s. itys (Edwards, 1882) (Arizona)
- S. s. nootka Fisher, 1998 (British Columbia)
- S. s. megapallidum Austin, 1998 (Nevada)
- S. s. putnami (H. Edwards, 1877) (Utah)
- S. s. sylvinus (California)
