= Satyrium mackwoodi =

Scientific classification
- Domain: Eukaryota
- Kingdom: Animalia
- Phylum: Arthropoda
- Class: Insecta
- Order: Lepidoptera
- Family: Lycaenidae
- Genus: Satyrium
- Species: S. mackwoodi

Binomial name
- Satyrium mackwoodi Evans

Species of butterfly

Satyrium mackwoodi, the Mackwood's hairstreak, is a small butterfly found in India that belongs to the lycaenids or blues family.

== See also ==
- List of butterflies of India
- List of butterflies of India (Lycaenidae)
