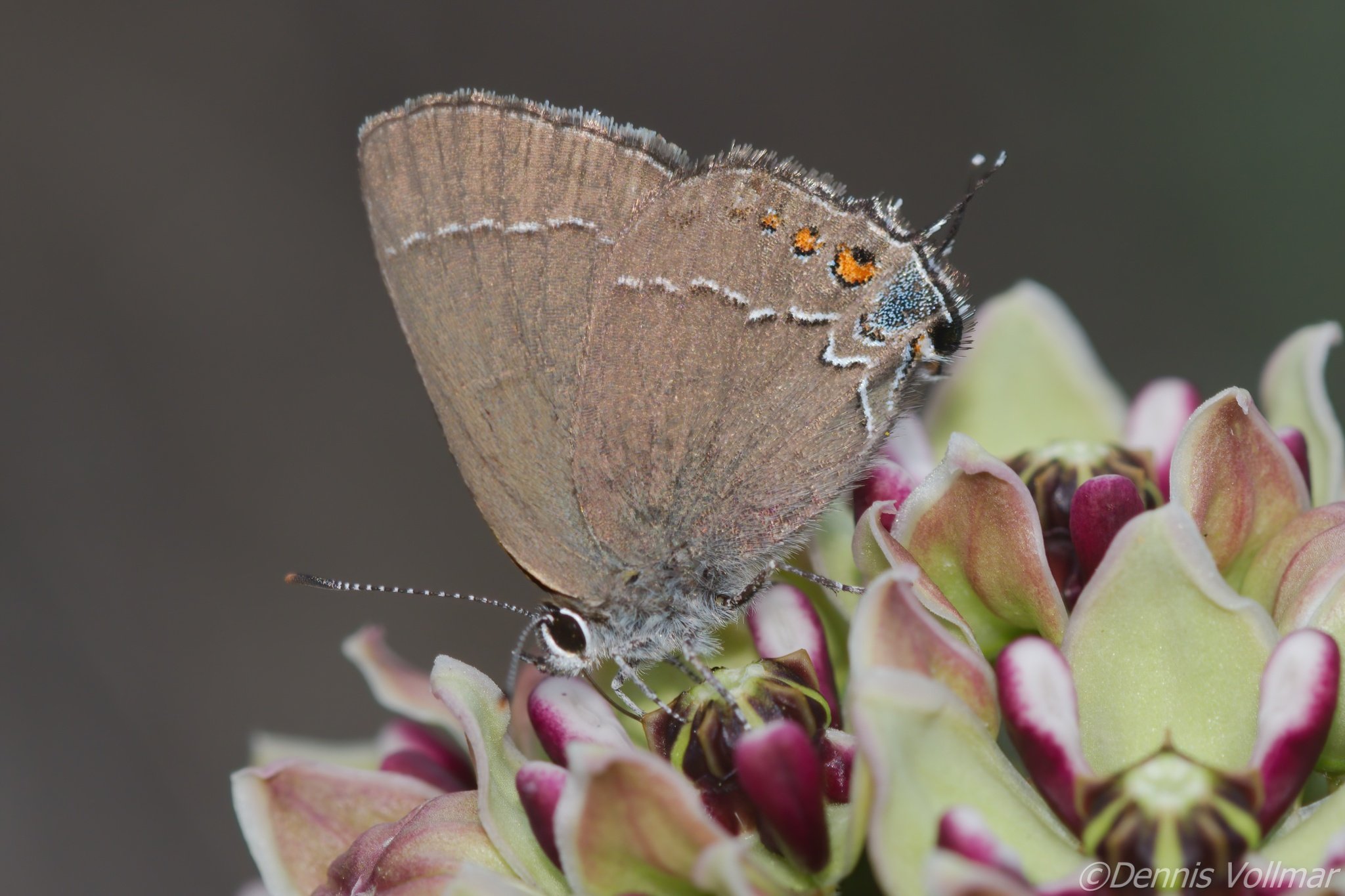

Scientific classification
- Domain: Eukaryota
- Kingdom: Animalia
- Phylum: Arthropoda
- Class: Insecta
- Order: Lepidoptera
- Family: Lycaenidae
- Genus: Satyrium
- Species: S. polingi

Binomial name
- Satyrium polingi (Barnes & Benjamin, 1926)

Synonyms
- Strymon polingi Barnes & Benjamin, 1926; Euristrymon polingi; Fixsenia polingi organensis Ferris, 1980

= Satyrium polingi =

Species of butterfly

Satyrium polingi, or Poling's hairstreak, is a butterfly of the family Lycaenidae. It was described by William Barnes and Foster Hendrickson Benjamin in 1926. It is found in North America from southern New Mexico and western Texas south to north-eastern Mexico. The habitat consists of oak woodlands.

The wingspan is 25–30 mm. Adults feed on flower nectar.

The larvae feed on the leaves, buds, and male catkins of Quercus emoryi and gray oak.

== Subspecies ==
- Satyrium polingi polingi (Texas)
- Satyrium polingi organensis (Ferris, 1980) (New Mexico)
