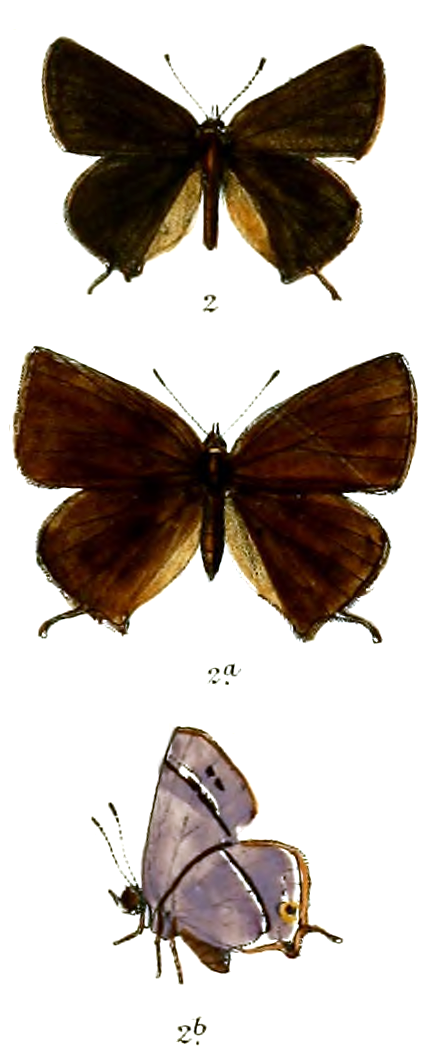
- Male, female and underside of male

Scientific classification
- Kingdom: Animalia
- Phylum: Arthropoda
- Class: Insecta
- Order: Lepidoptera
- Family: Lycaenidae
- Genus: Satyrium
- Species: S. sassanides

Binomial name
- Satyrium sassanides (Kollar 1850)

Synonyms
- Superflua sassanides

= Satyrium sassanides =

White-line hairstreak

Species of butterfly

Satyrium sassanides, the white-line hairstreak, is a small butterfly found in India that belongs to the lycaenids or blues family.
