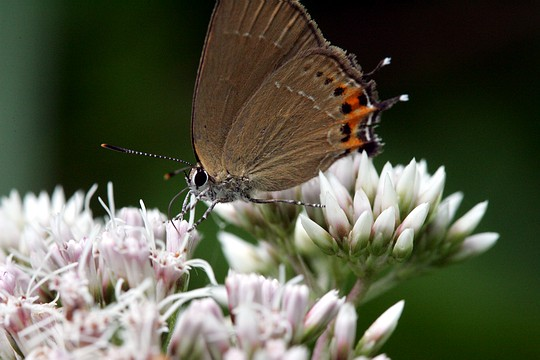

Scientific classification
- Domain: Eukaryota
- Kingdom: Animalia
- Phylum: Arthropoda
- Class: Insecta
- Order: Lepidoptera
- Family: Lycaenidae
- Genus: Satyrium
- Species: S. mera

Binomial name
- Satyrium mera Janson, 1873

Synonyms
- Strymonidia mera

= Satyrium mera =

Species of butterfly

Satyrium mera is a butterfly of the family Lycaenidae. It is endemic to Japan. The larva on feeds on Rhamnus (Rhamnaceae). Satyrium mera is single brooded and overwinters as an egg.

Adults are found in August. Regional variants, as in the ground colour of the wing, occur. There are oval sexual marks on the surface of the forewing of males but not in females.

Description in Seitz: "Still larger, almost equalling in size a large S. pruni but the male above without any red in the anal area of the hindwing. The tails longer than in S. pruni, the white line of the underside distinct and very straight, double in the anal area of the hindwing. — In Japan, not plentiful, probably the eastern representative of pruni, which does not occur in Japan."
