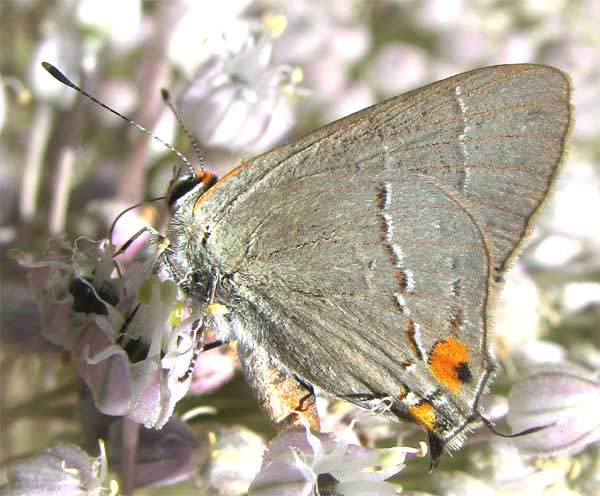

Conservation status
- Apparently Secure (NatureServe)

Scientific classification
- Kingdom: Animalia
- Phylum: Arthropoda
- Clade: Pancrustacea
- Class: Insecta
- Order: Lepidoptera
- Family: Lycaenidae
- Genus: Satyrium
- Species: S. favonius

Binomial name
- Satyrium favonius (Smith, 1797)

Synonyms
- Papilio favonius Smith, 1797; Thecla favonius; Euristrymon favonius; Strymon favonius; Fixsenia favonius

= Satyrium favonius =

Species of butterfly

Satyrium favonius, the oak hairstreak or southern hairstreak, is a butterfly of the family Lycaenidae. It is found in the United States from southern New England and the Atlantic Coast south to peninsular Florida and west to central Illinois, south-eastern Colorado and the Gulf Coast.

The wingspan is 22–38 mm.

The larvae feed on the leaves, buds and male catkins of Quercus species. The species overwinters as an egg.
