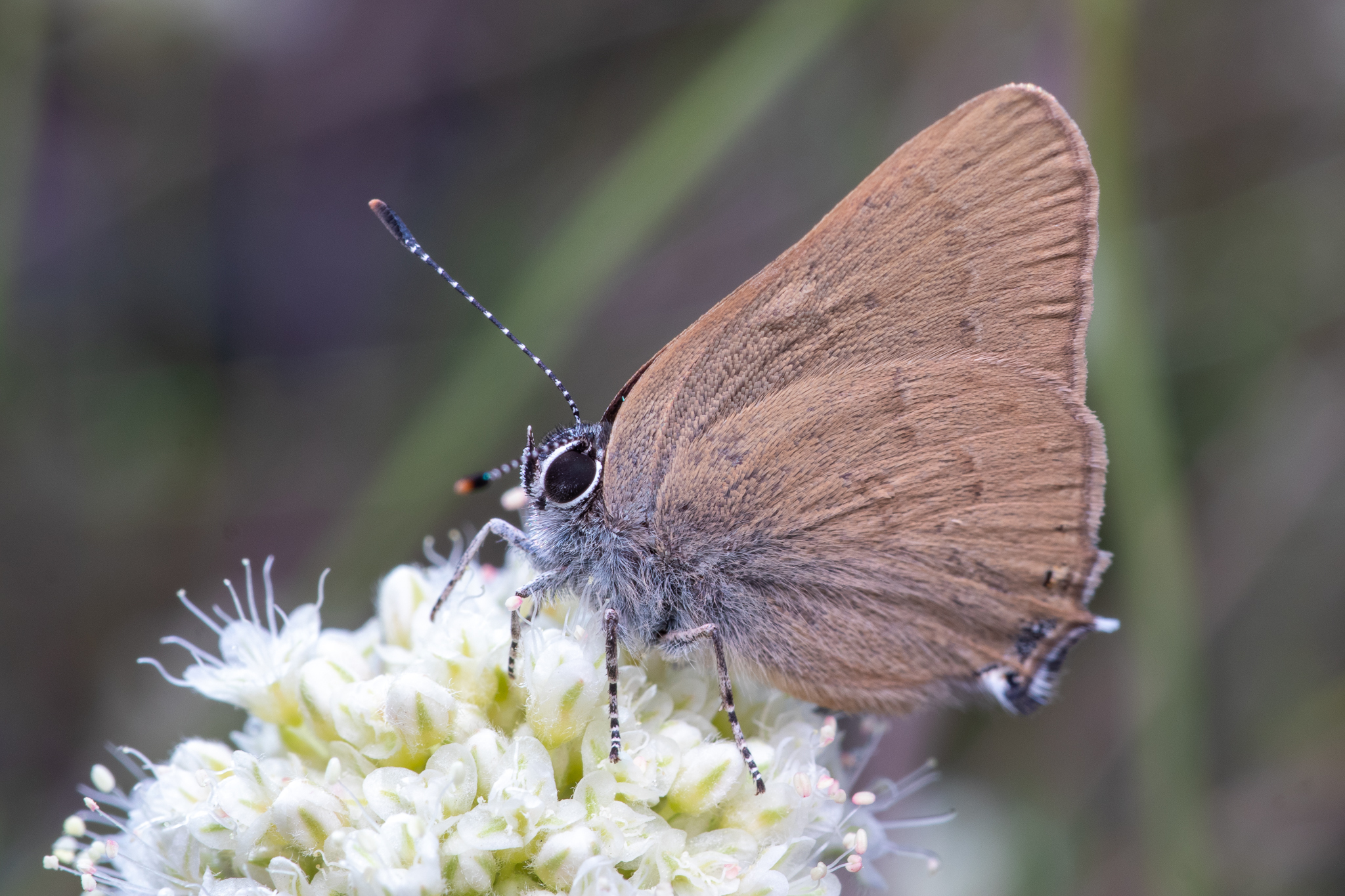

Scientific classification
- Domain: Eukaryota
- Kingdom: Animalia
- Phylum: Arthropoda
- Class: Insecta
- Order: Lepidoptera
- Family: Lycaenidae
- Genus: Satyrium
- Species: S. auretorum

Binomial name
- Satyrium auretorum (Boisduval, 1852)

= Satyrium auretorum =

Species of butterfly

Satyrium auretorum, or gold-hunter's hairstreak, is a species of hairstreak in the butterfly family Lycaenidae. It is found in North America.

The MONA or Hodges number for Satyrium auretorum is 4286.

== Subspecies ==
These three subspecies belong to the species Satyrium auretorum:

- Satyrium auretorum auretorum (Boisduval, 1852)
- Satyrium auretorum fumosum J. Emmel & Mattoni, 1990
- Satyrium auretorum spadix (Hy. Edwards, 1881)
