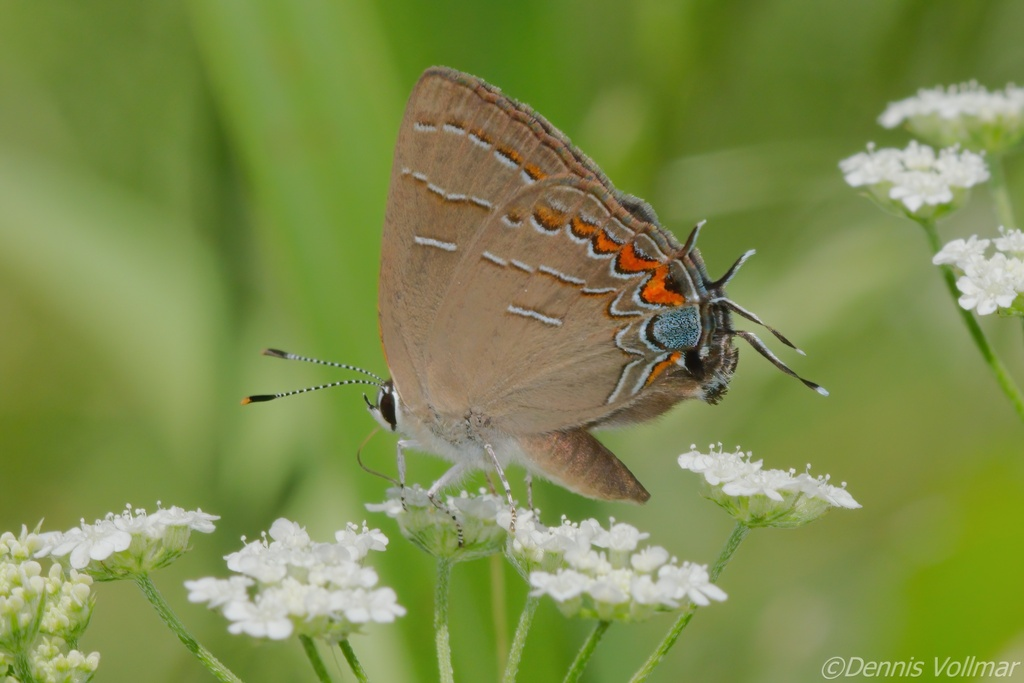

Scientific classification
- Kingdom: Animalia
- Phylum: Arthropoda
- Class: Insecta
- Order: Lepidoptera
- Family: Lycaenidae
- Tribe: Eumaeini
- Genus: Satyrium
- Species: S. alcestis

Binomial name
- Satyrium alcestis (W. H. Edwards 1871)

Synonyms
- Thecla alcestis Edwards, 1871; Strymon alcestis (Edwards, 1871); Phaeostrymon alcestis (Edwards, 1871)

= Satyrium alcestis =

Soapberry hairstreak

Species of butterfly

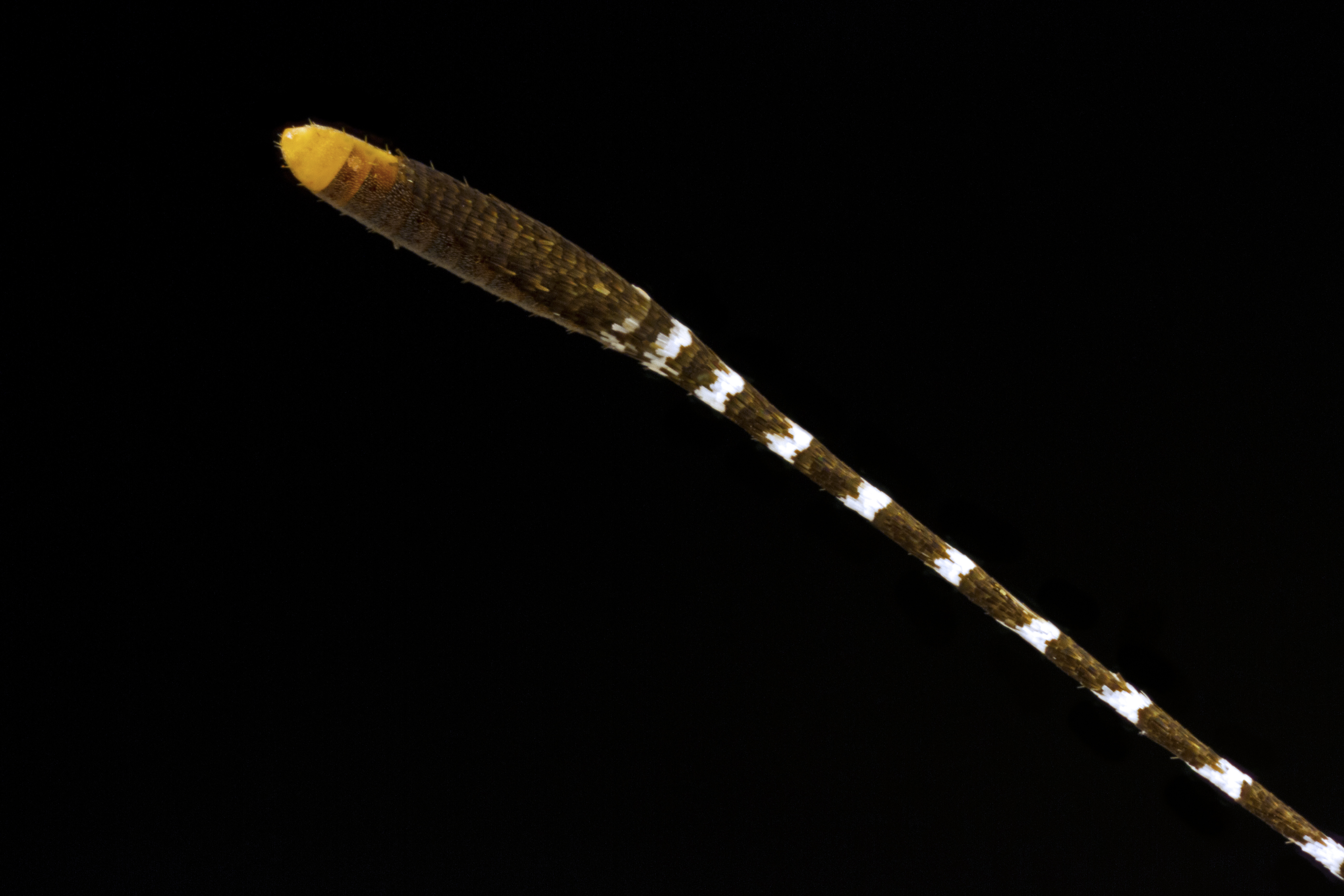
Phaeostrymon alcestis antenna

Satyrium alcestis, the soapberry hairstreak, is a species of gossamer-winged butterfly. It was previously considered the only member of the former genus Phaeostrymon, but was originally described as Thecla alcestis Edwards, 1871. It was later revised as Satyrium alcestis The species is found in southwestern United States and Mexico, where its larvae are often found feeding on Soapberry.
