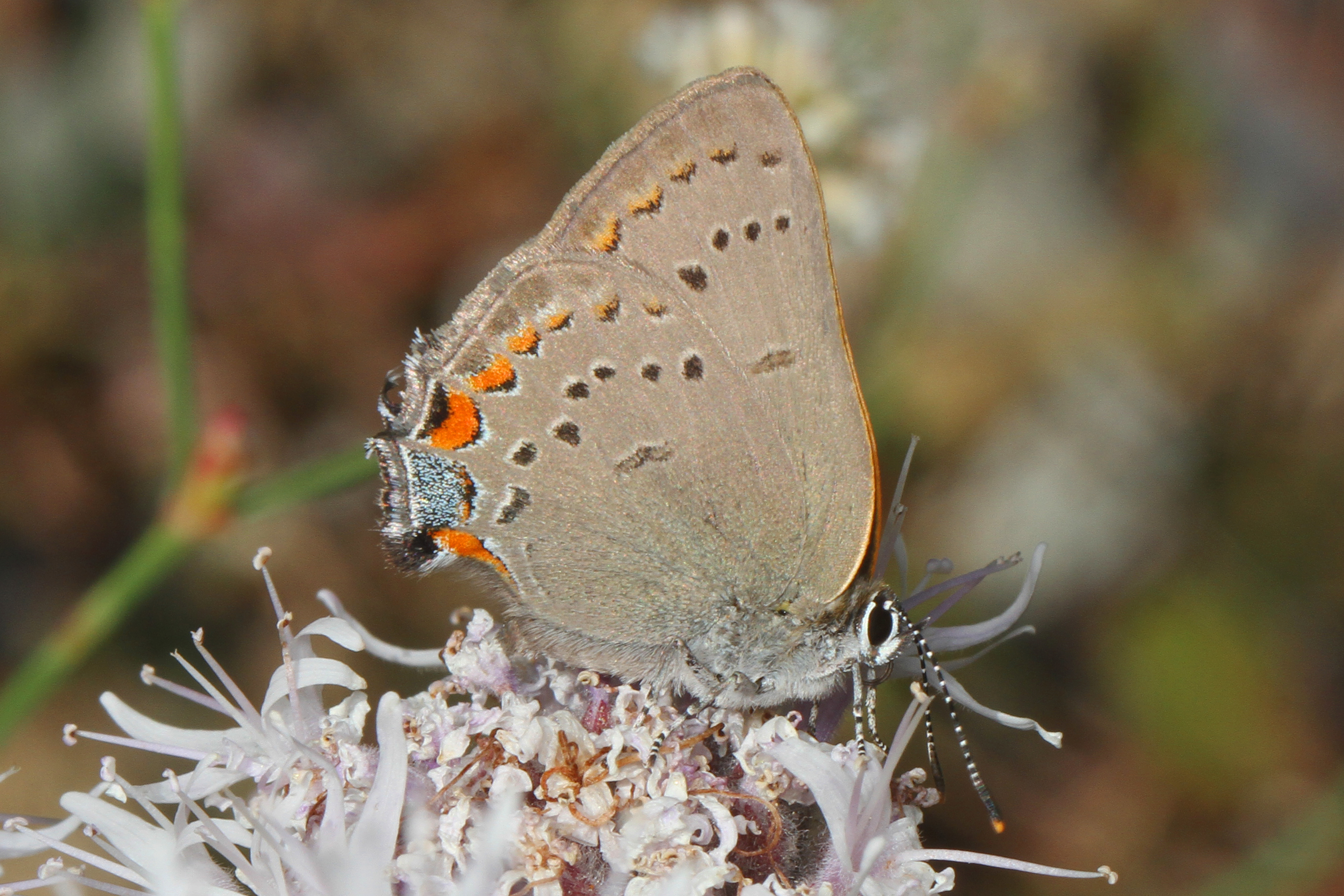

Scientific classification
- Domain: Eukaryota
- Kingdom: Animalia
- Phylum: Arthropoda
- Class: Insecta
- Order: Lepidoptera
- Family: Lycaenidae
- Genus: Satyrium
- Species: S. californica

Binomial name
- Satyrium californica (Edwards, 1862)

Synonyms
- Thecla californica Edwards, 1862; Thecla borus Boisduval, 1868; Thecla cygnus Edwards, 1871; Satyrium californicum obscurafacies Austin, 1998

= Satyrium californica =

California hairstreak

Species of butterfly

Satyrium californica, the California hairstreak, is a butterfly of the family Lycaenidae. It is found from British Columbia south to southern California and east to Colorado.

== Description ==
The wingspan is 25–32 millimetres (0.98–1.26 in). Underside of wings are gray with band of black spots and band of orange markings near the margin. The hindwing has a pale blue spot with small or no orange cap, and two "tails." Upperside of wings are brown with orange markings near these tails on the hindwings.

== Behavior ==
Adults feed on the nectar of various flowers, including Eriogonum and Asclepias species. In Canada, the larvae feed on Cercocarpus, Salix species, buckbrush (Ceanothus spp.), antelope-brush (Purshia tridentata), oaks (Quercus spp.), cherry (Prunus spp.), and saskatoon (Amelanchier alnifolia). In California, they are noted to feed on oaks, Apocynum cannabinum, Marrubium species, Ceanothus velutinus, California buckeye, milkweed, and other plants.

Adults are active April to September, depending on region. They overwinter as eggs.

== Subspecies ==
Listed alphabetically.

- S. c. brashor Kondla & Scott, 2006
- S. c. californica
- S. c. cygnus (Edwards, 1871)
- S. c. obscurafacies (Austin, 1998)
- S. c. wapiti Fisher, 2006
