= Satyrium ledereri =

Orange banded hairstreak
- S. ledereri in Seitz

Scientific classification
- Kingdom: Animalia
- Phylum: Arthropoda
- Clade: Pancrustacea
- Class: Insecta
- Order: Lepidoptera
- Family: Lycaenidae
- Genus: Satyrium
- Species: S. ledereri

Binomial name
- Satyrium ledereri (Boisduval, 1848)

Species of butterfly

Satyrium ledereri, the orange banded hairstreak, is a butterfly in the family Lycaenidae.

== Description in Seitz ==
T. ledereri Bsd. (73 e). Tailed or tailless, with long fringes and the anal angle of the hindwing somewhat pointed. Upperside blackish brown, the basal area glossy grey on both wings; in the anal area of the hindwing an obsolescent russet-brown macular halfband. Underside light grey, the base dusted with light blue; both wings with a row of exteriorly white-edged black ocelli, outside which there are black submarginal spots on the forewing and a double row of dots on the hindwing with red spots between the two rows. — In Asia Minor, Transcaucasia, Transcaspia and Armenia, in May.

== Distribution ==
The distribution of the orange banded hairstreak in Europe includes Transcaucasia, Asia Minor, Anatolia, Palestine, and the Greek island of Samos.

== Life cycle and food plants ==
The butterflies are on wing from April to May. Larval host plants are Atraphaxis daghestanica and A. spinosa. The species has one generation per year; the egg hibernates.

== Etymology ==
The name honours Julius Lederer
