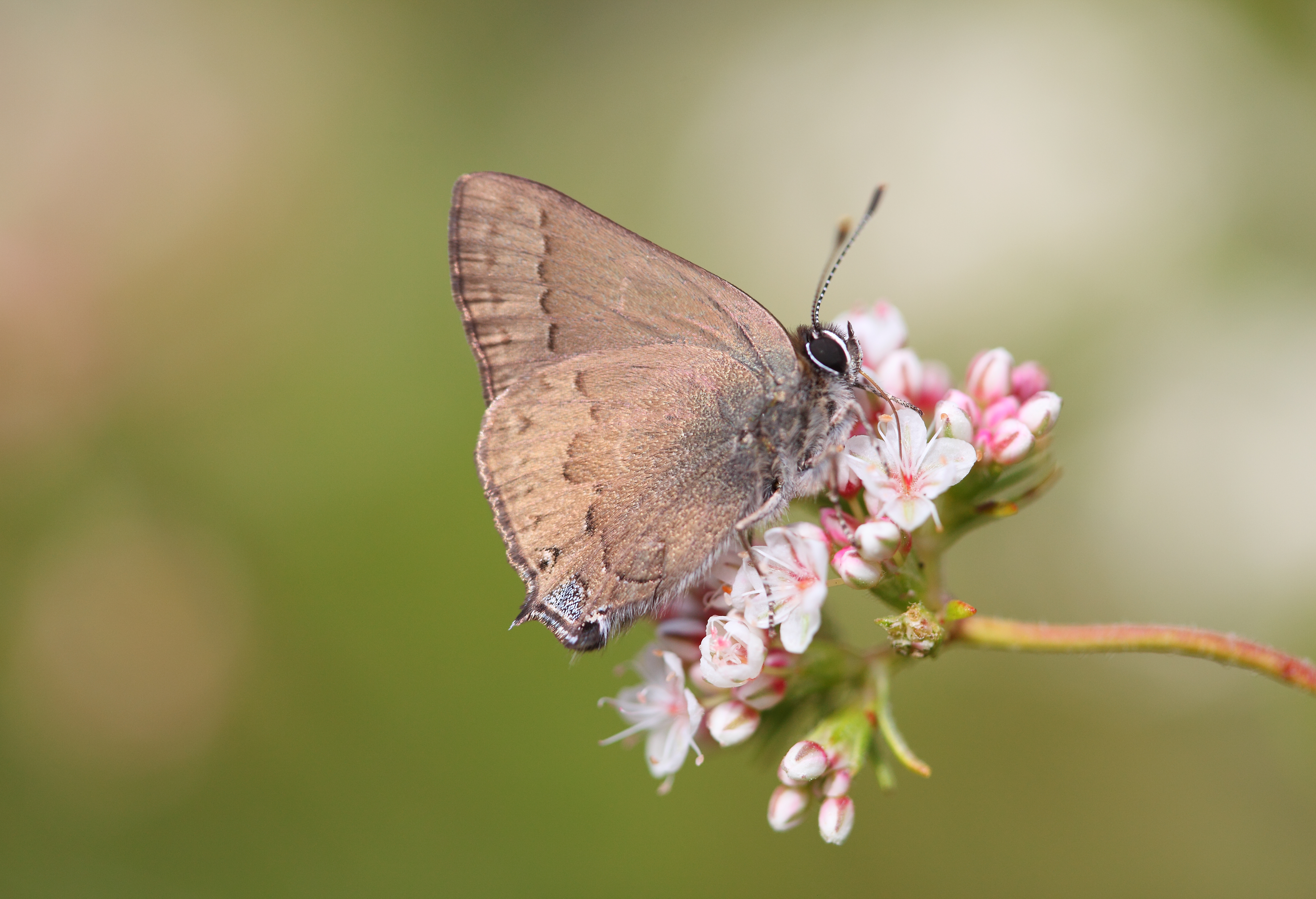

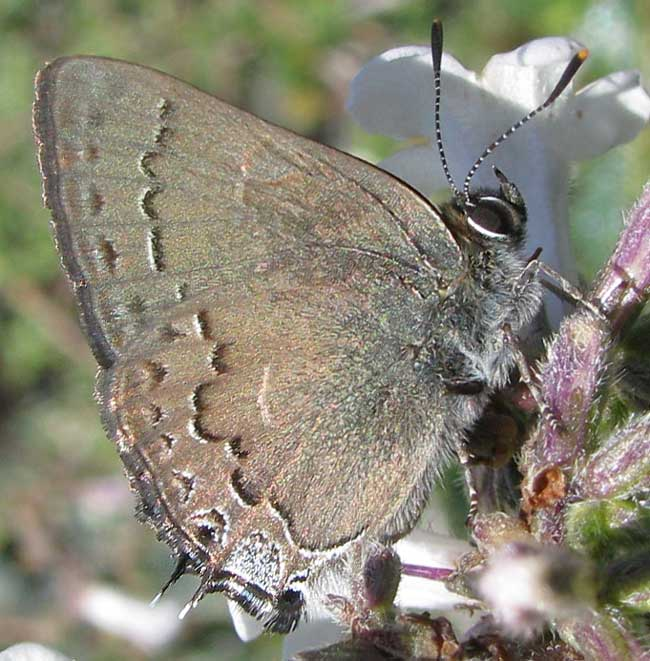

Scientific classification
- Domain: Eukaryota
- Kingdom: Animalia
- Phylum: Arthropoda
- Class: Insecta
- Order: Lepidoptera
- Family: Lycaenidae
- Genus: Satyrium
- Species: S. saepium

Binomial name
- Satyrium saepium (Boisduval, 1852)

Synonyms
- Thecla saepium Boisduval, 1852; Strymon saepium var. okanagana McDunnough, 1944; Ignata illepida Johnson, 1992; Thecla chalcis Edwards, 1869; Thecla saepium var. fulvescens H. Edwards, 1877; Strymon saepium chlorophora Watson & Comstock, 1920; Strymon saepium provo Watson & Comstock, 1920; Satyrium saepium rubrotenebrosum Emmel, Emmel & Mattoon, 1998; Satyrium saepium caliginosum Emmel, Emmel & Mattoon, 1998; Satyrium saepium subaridum Emmel, Emmel & Mattoon, 1998; Satyrium saepium obscurofuscum Austin, 1998; Satyrium saepium latalinea Austin & Savage, 1998

= Satyrium saepium =

Hedgerow hairstreak

Species of butterfly

Satyrium saepium, the hedgerow hairstreak, is a butterfly of the family Lycaenidae. It is found in western North America, from British Columbia south through California into Baja California and east through northern Arizona to northern New Mexico, Colorado and Montana.

The wingspan is 26–30 mm. Adults are on wing from April to September. They feed on the nectar of various flowers, including yerba santa and wild buckwheats.

The larvae feed on the buckbrush (Ceanothus species, Rhamnaceae).

== Subspecies ==
- S. s. caliginosum Emmel, Emmel & Mattoon, 1998 (California)
- S. s. chalcis (Edwards, 1869) (California)
- S. s. chlorophora (Watson & Comstock, 1920) (California)
- S. s. fulvescens (H. Edwards, 1877) (California)
- S. s. latalinea Austin & Savage, 1998 (Utah)
- S. s. obscurofuscum Austin, 1998 (Nevada)
- S. s. provo (Watson & Comstock, 1920) (Utah)
- S. s. rubrotenebrosum Emmel, Emmel & Mattoon, 1998 (California)
- S. s. subaridum Emmel, Emmel & Mattoon, 1998 (California)
- S. s. saepium (California to British Columbia)
