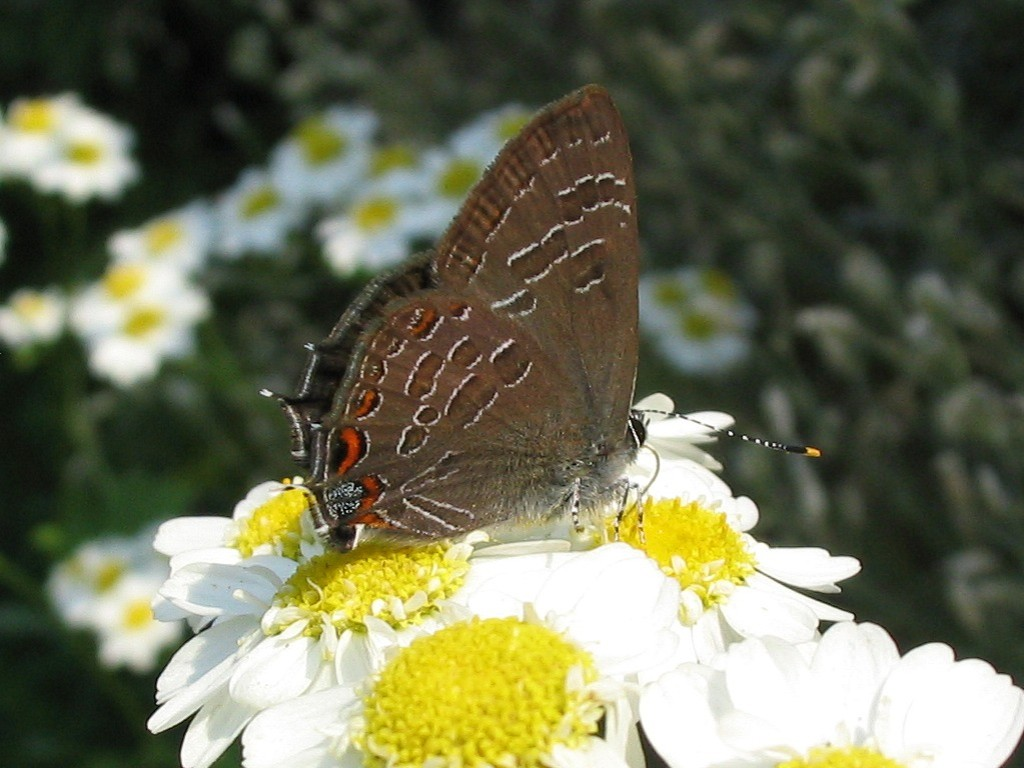
- Satyrium liparops strigosa

Conservation status
- Secure (NatureServe)

Scientific classification
- Domain: Eukaryota
- Kingdom: Animalia
- Phylum: Arthropoda
- Class: Insecta
- Order: Lepidoptera
- Family: Lycaenidae
- Genus: Satyrium
- Species: S. liparops

Binomial name
- Satyrium liparops (Le Conte, [1833])

Synonyms
- Thecla liparops Le Conte, [1833]; Hesperia anacreon Fabricius, 1793; Thecla strigosa Harris, 1862; Thecla liparops pruina Scudder, 1889; Strymon liparops fletcheri Michener & dos Passos, 1942; Thecla strigosa var. liparops J. Fletcher, 1903; Thecla strigosa var. liparops J. Fletcher, 1904; Strymon liparops aliparops Michener & dos Passos, 1942

= Satyrium liparops =

Striped hairstreak

Species of butterfly

Satyrium liparops, the striped hairstreak, is a butterfly of the family Lycaenidae described by John Eatton Le Conte in 1833. It is found in North America, from the Rocky Mountains south from southern Canada to Colorado, east to Maine and south to Florida.

== Subspecies ==
- S. l. aliparops (Michener & dos Passos, 1942) – (Colorado, southern Alberta to Manitoba)
- S. l. fletcheri (Michener & dos Passos, 1942) – (Manitoba, northern Ontario to Alberta)
- S. l. floridensis Gatrelle, 2001 – (Florida)
- S. l. liparops – (Georgia)
- S. l. strigosa (Harris, 1862) – (Massachusetts, New England, eastern Canada)
