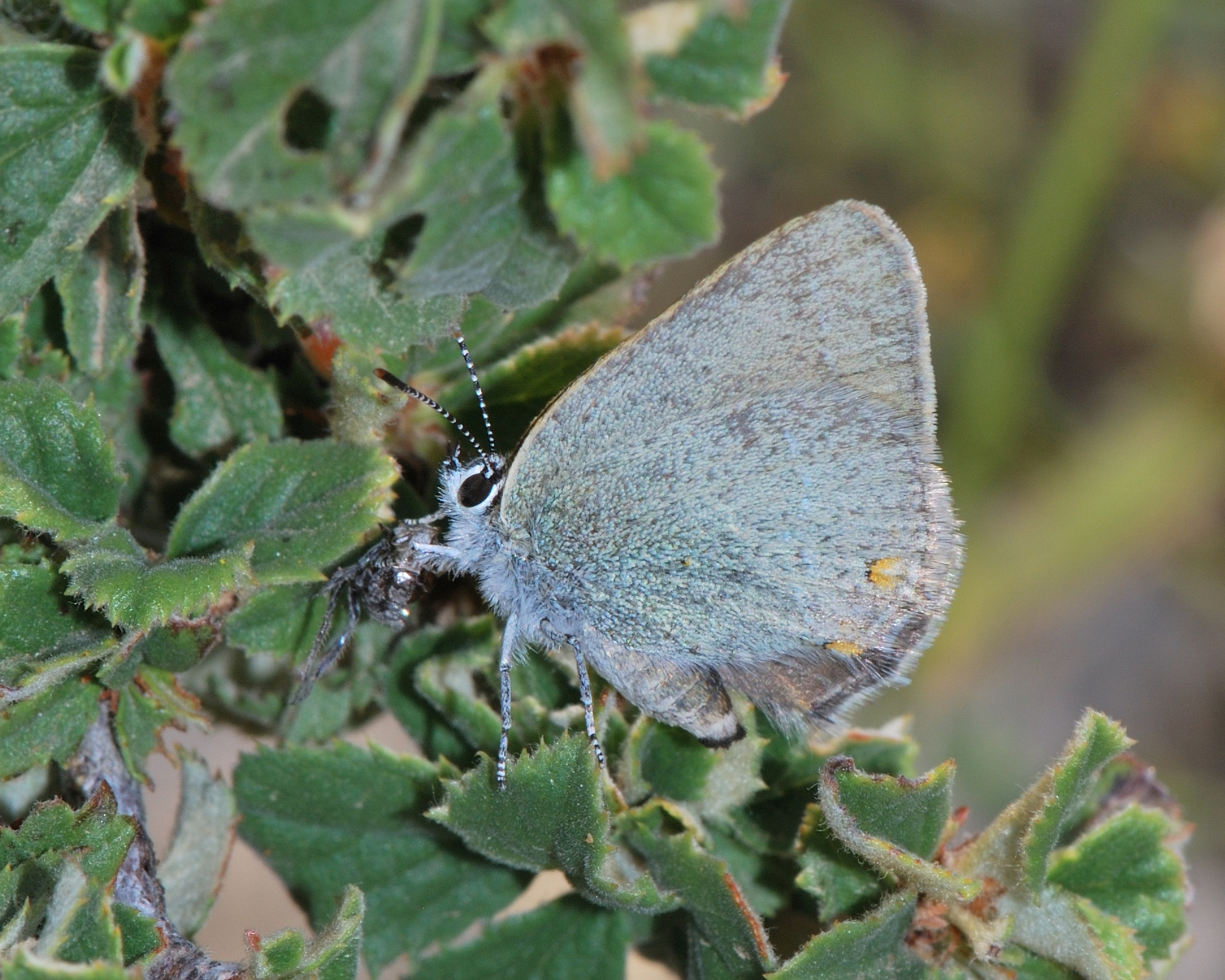

Scientific classification
- Kingdom: Animalia
- Phylum: Arthropoda
- Clade: Pancrustacea
- Class: Insecta
- Order: Lepidoptera
- Family: Lycaenidae
- Genus: Satyrium
- Species: S. myrtale

Binomial name
- Satyrium myrtale (Klug, 1834)

= Satyrium myrtale =

Species of butterfly

Satyrium myrtale, is a butterfly in the family Lycaenidae.
