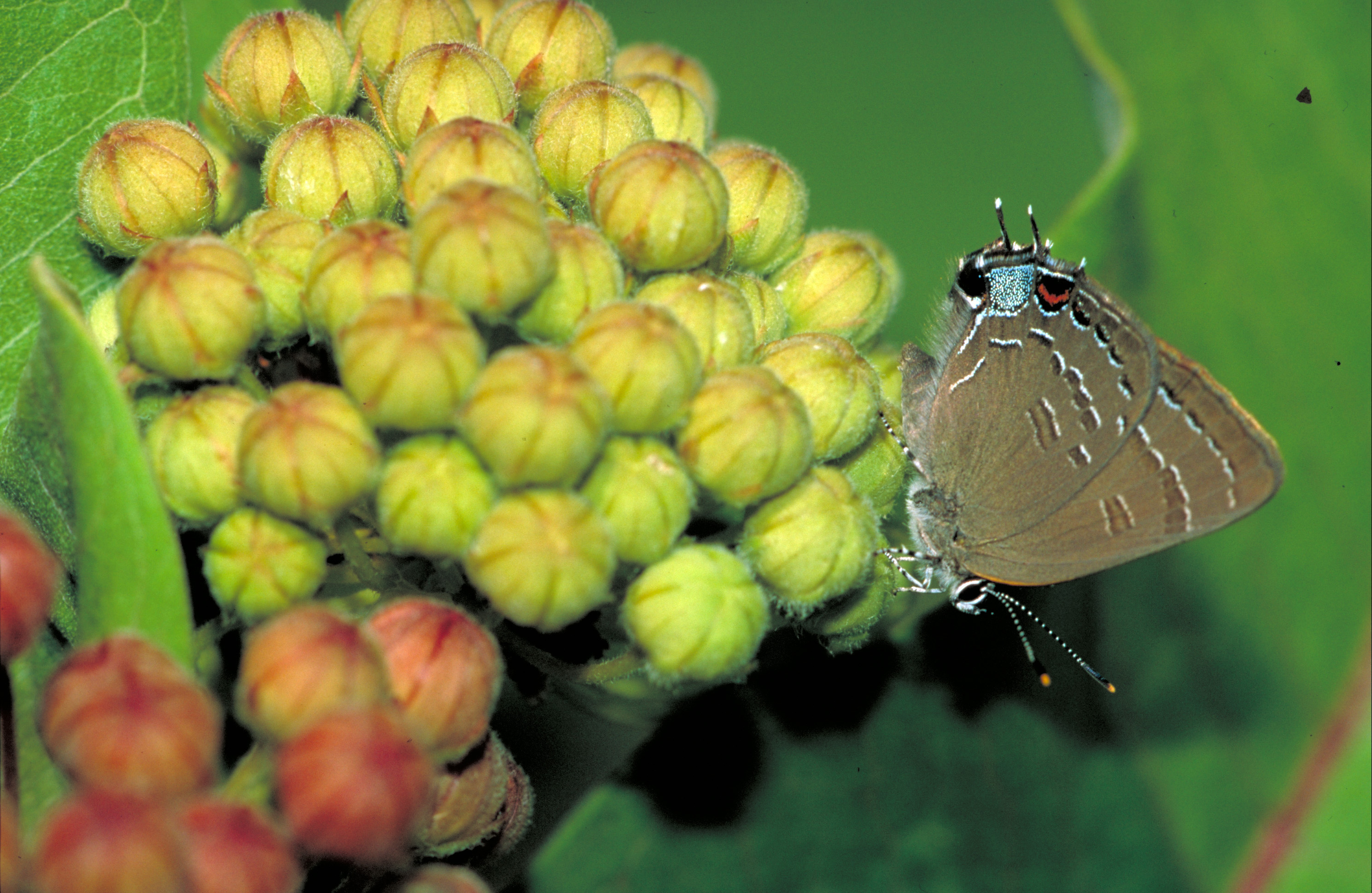

Conservation status
- Apparently Secure (NatureServe)

Scientific classification
- Kingdom: Animalia
- Phylum: Arthropoda
- Clade: Pancrustacea
- Class: Insecta
- Order: Lepidoptera
- Family: Lycaenidae
- Genus: Satyrium
- Species: S. edwardsii

Binomial name
- Satyrium edwardsii (Grote & Robinson, 1867)

Synonyms
- Thecla edwardsii Saunders, 1869

= Satyrium edwardsii =

Edwards' hairstreak

Species of butterfly

Satyrium edwardsii, the Edwards' hairstreak, is a species of butterfly in the family Lycaenidae. It is found in the eastern parts of the United States and in the southern parts of the Canadian provinces from Saskatchewan to Quebec.

Larvae feed on Quercus species, including Q. ilicifolia
