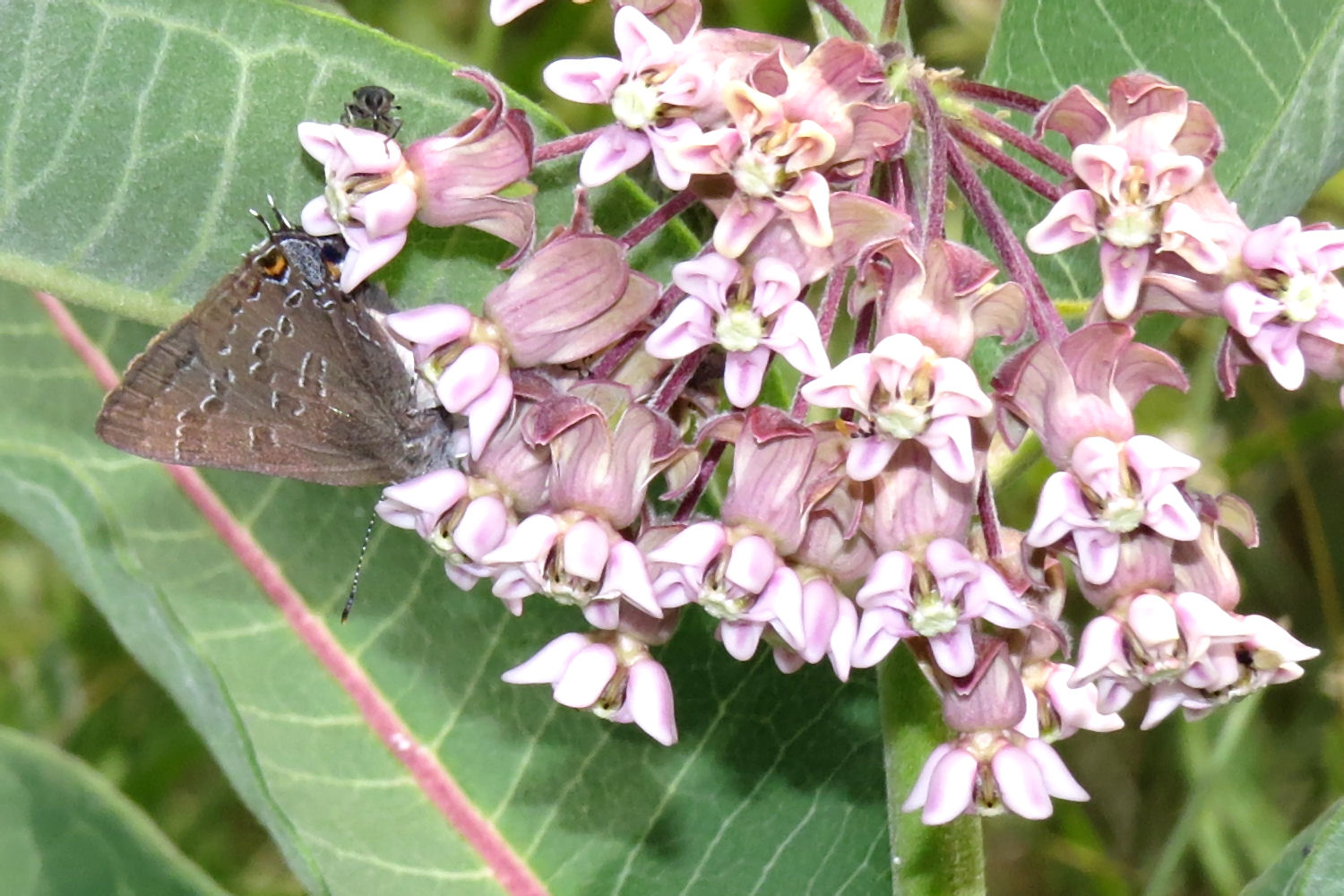
- On common milkweed

Conservation status
- Apparently Secure (NatureServe)

Scientific classification
- Domain: Eukaryota
- Kingdom: Animalia
- Phylum: Arthropoda
- Class: Insecta
- Order: Lepidoptera
- Family: Lycaenidae
- Genus: Satyrium
- Species: S. caryaevorus

Binomial name
- Satyrium caryaevorus (McDunnough, 1942)

= Satyrium caryaevorus =

Species of butterfly

Satyrium caryaevorus, the hickory hairstreak, is a butterfly of the family Lycaenidae. It is found in eastern North America, from southern Ontario west to Minnesota and Iowa, south in the Appalachian Mountains to eastern Tennessee.

The wingspan has been reported as 22–28 mm and 29–35 mm. The hindwing has one tail. Adults are on wing from June to August in one generation per year. They feed on the nectar of various flowers, including common milkweed, dogbane, New Jersey tea, staghorn sumac, and white sweet clover.

The larvae feed on the leaves of bitternut hickory (Carya cordiformis), butternut (Juglans cinerea), red oak (Quercus rubra), white ash (Fraxinus americana), and hawthorn (Crataegus species). The species overwinters as an egg.

The MONA or Hodges number for Satyrium caryaevorus is 4283.
