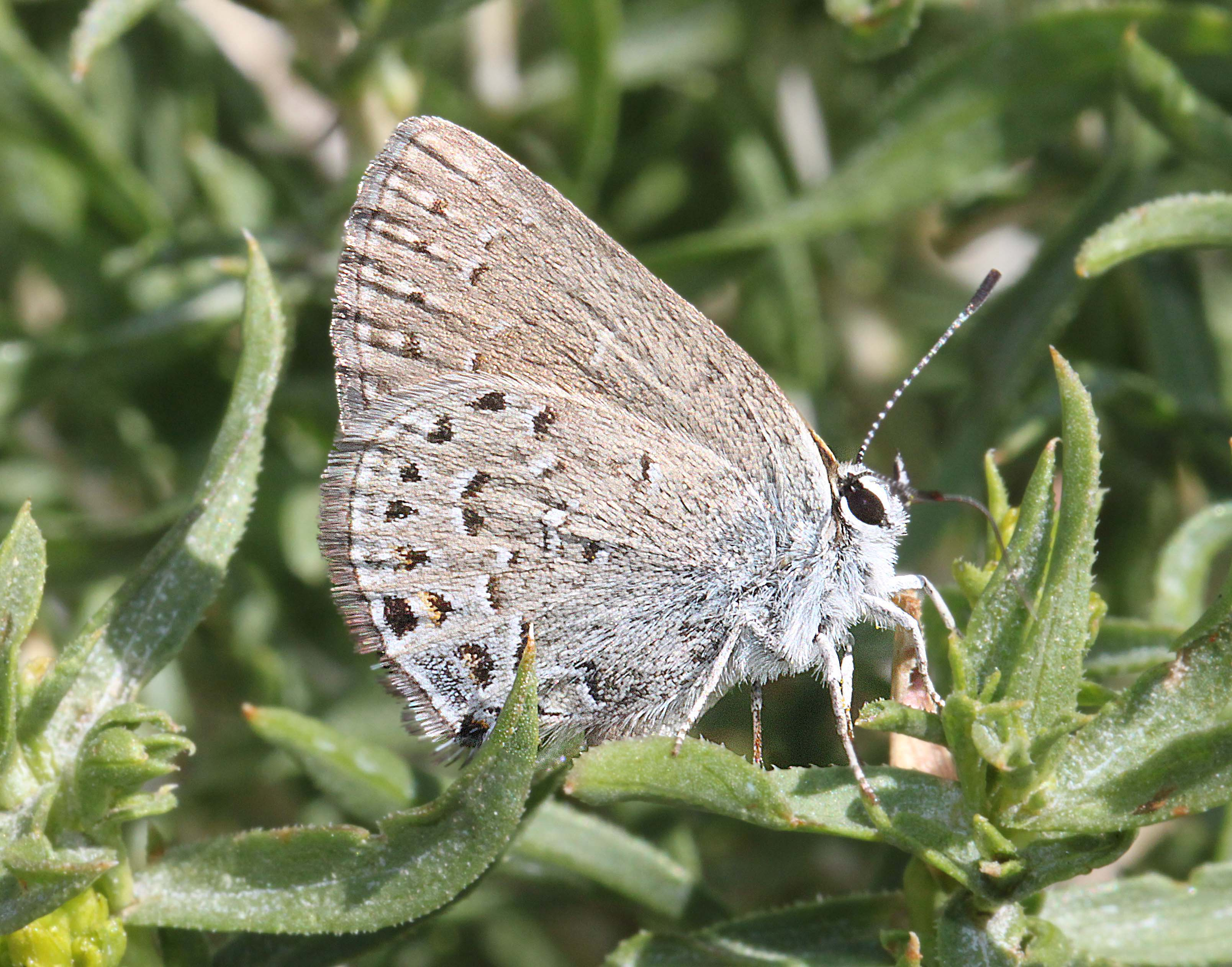

Conservation status
- Apparently Secure (NatureServe)

Scientific classification
- Domain: Eukaryota
- Kingdom: Animalia
- Phylum: Arthropoda
- Class: Insecta
- Order: Lepidoptera
- Family: Lycaenidae
- Genus: Satyrium
- Species: S. behrii

Binomial name
- Satyrium behrii (W.H. Edwards, 1870)

Synonyms
- Thecla behrii Edwards, 1870; Callipsyche behrii Dyar, 1903; Thecla kali Strecker, [1878]; Callipsyche behrii ab. nigroinita Gunder, 1924; Callipsyche behrii crossi Field, 1938; Callipsyche behrii columbia McDunnough, 1944

= Satyrium behrii =

Species of butterfly

Satyrium behrii, the Behr's hairstreak, is a butterfly of the family Lycaenidae. It is found in western North America from western Texas north and west through New Mexico, Arizona, and southern California to British Columbia.

The wingspan is 24–32 mm. Adults are on wing from June to July in one generation per year. Its habitats include dry slopes and canyons. Adults feed on flower nectar.

The larvae feed on Purshia tridentata,Purshia glandulosa and Cercocarpus montanus.

== Subspecies ==
- S. b. behrii
- S. b. columbia (McDunnough, 1944)
- S. b. crossi (Field, 1938)
