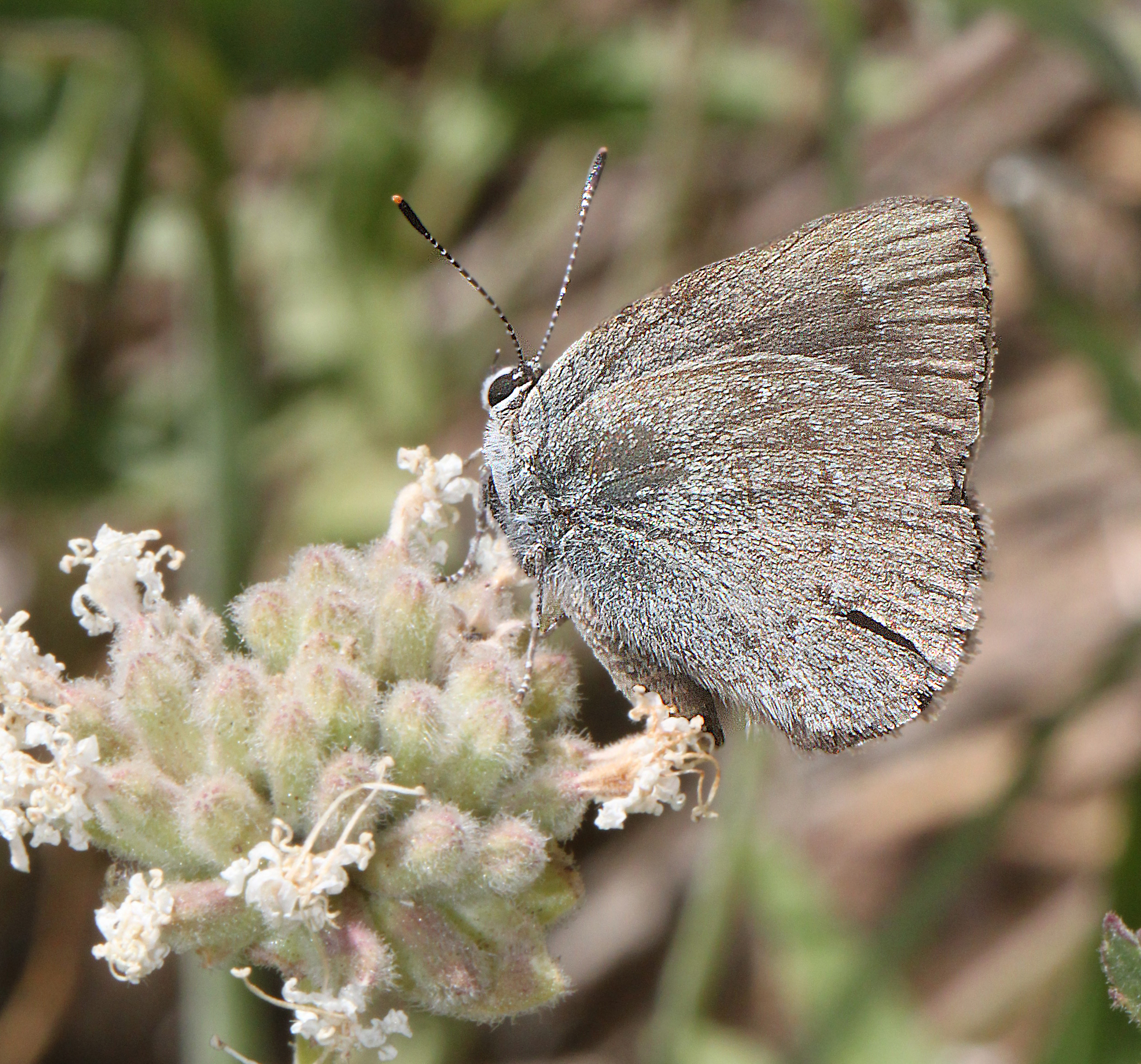

Conservation status
- Secure (NatureServe)

Scientific classification
- Domain: Eukaryota
- Kingdom: Animalia
- Phylum: Arthropoda
- Class: Insecta
- Order: Lepidoptera
- Family: Lycaenidae
- Genus: Satyrium
- Species: S. fuliginosum

Binomial name
- Satyrium fuliginosum (W.H. Edwards, 1861)

Synonyms
- Lycaena fuliginosa Edwards, 1861; Satyrium fuliginosa; Lycaena suasa Boisduval, 1869; Satyrium fuliginosum tildeni Mattoon & Austin, 1998

= Satyrium fuliginosum =

Species of butterfly

Satyrium fuliginosum, the sooty hairstreak, is a butterfly of the family Lycaenidae. It is found in western North America from British Columbia to central California, east to Wyoming and northern Colorado.

Adults are on wing from July to August. Adults feed on flower nectar.

The larvae feed on Lupinus.

== Subspecies ==
- Satyrium fuliginosum albolineatum Mattoon & Austin, 1998
- Satyrium fuliginosum fuliginosum
- Satyrium fuliginosum tildenia Mattoon & Austin, 1998
