= Johann Heinrich Fixsen =

German entomologist

Johann Heinrich Fixsen (19 October 1825 in St. Petersburg – 4 September 1899 in Hamburg) was a German entomologist who specialized in the Lepidoptera of the Palaearctic Region.

He wrote Lepidopteren-Verzeichniss der Umgegend von St. Petersburg (In Bull Moscou 22(1)) 1849 and many other scientific works describing new species. His collection is in the Biozentrum Grindel und Zoologisches Museum.
