= List of butterflies of North America (Lycaenidae) =

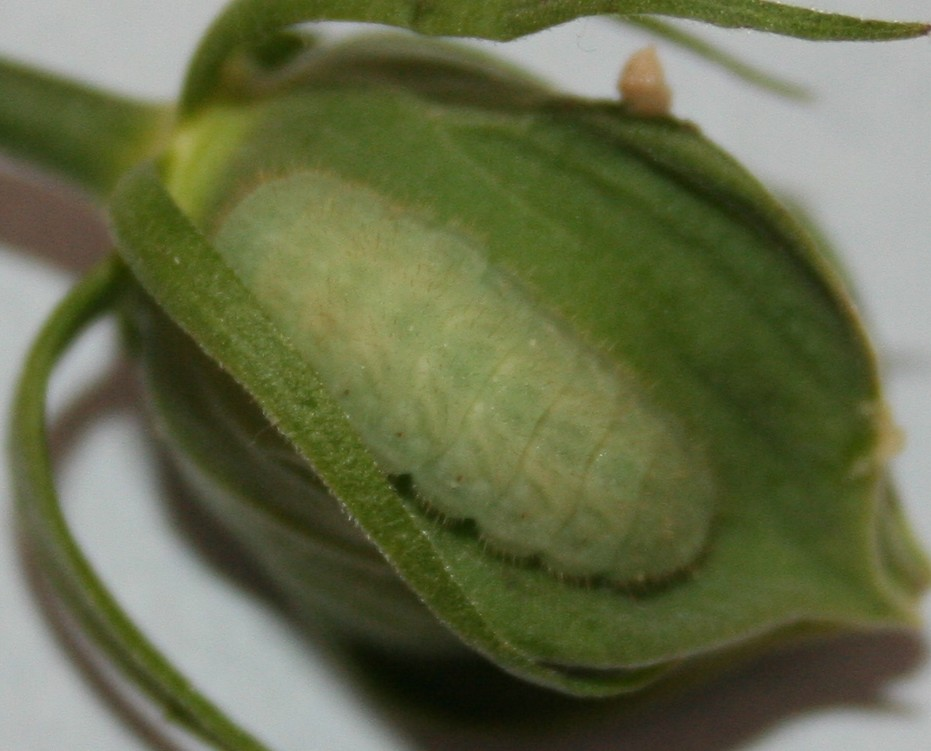
Gray hairstreak, Strymon melinus, larva

Gossamer-wings are the smallest butterflies. Their wingspans range from 0.5-2.0 inches (1.2-5.1 cm). There are about 7,000 species worldwide with about 139 species in North America. Gossamer-wings include the subfamilies hairstreaks, harvesters, coppers, and blues. Their flights vary from the fast, erratic hairstreaks to the slow, bouncy blues. They like to feed at flowers, and males like to puddle at damp ground. Most male gossamer-wings locate females by perching, while some males patrol. The turban-shaped eggs are usually laid singly. The larva is oval shaped with a flattened underside. Some species have honeydew glands that attract ants. Ants like to eat and collect the honeydew made by the caterpillar. In turn, the ants will swarm over anything that might try to harm the larva. The chrysalis is usually formed in leaf litter. Many chrysalises can make faint noises. Scientists believe this noise might ward off predatory ants.

== Subfamily Miletinae: harvesters ==
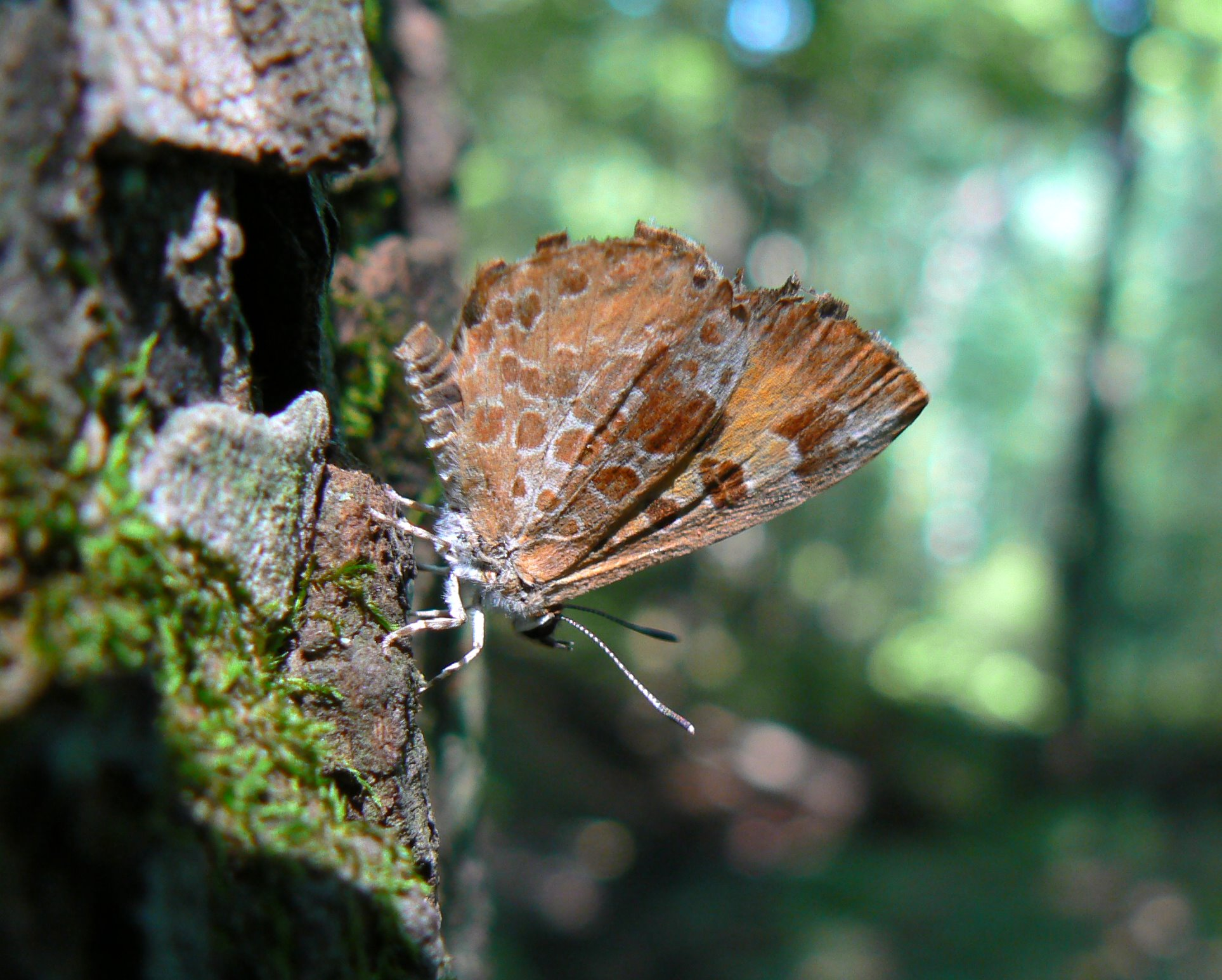
Harvester, Feniseca tarquinius

- Harvester, Feniseca tarquinius

== Subfamily Lycaeninae: coppers ==
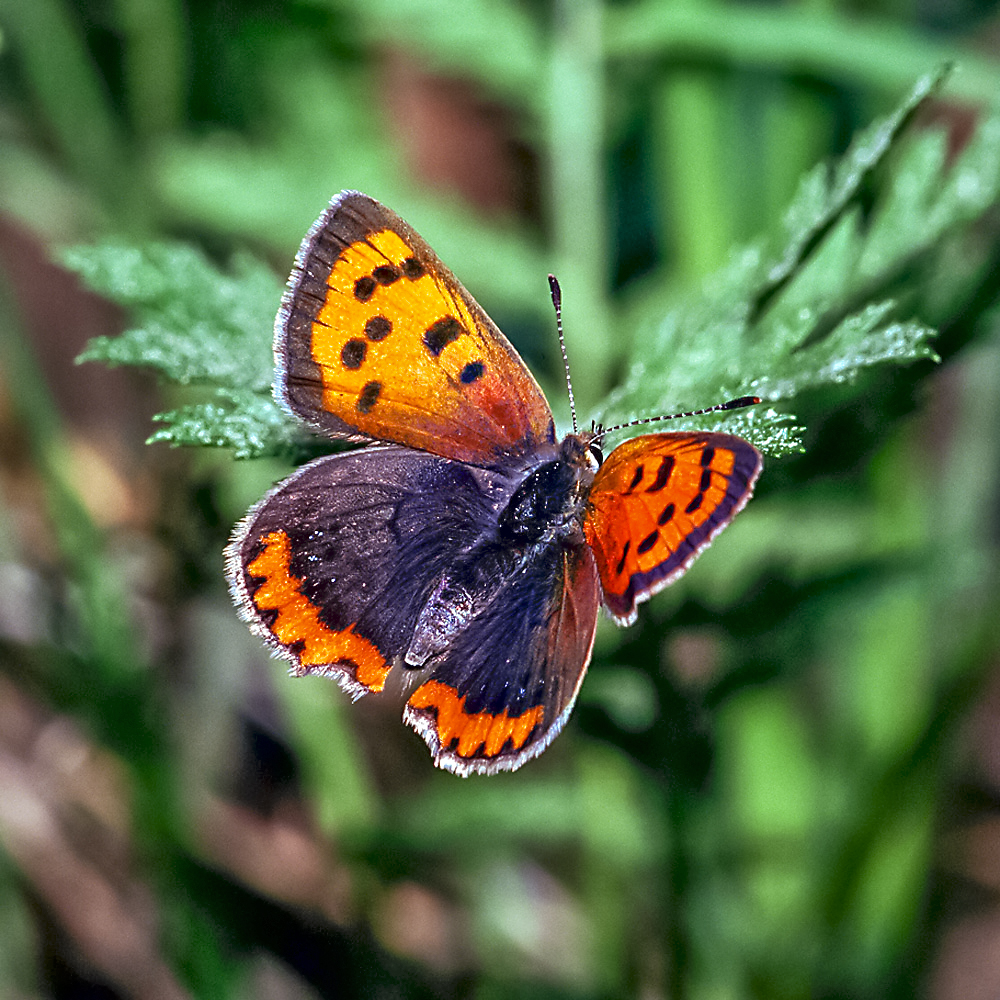
American copper, Lycaena phlaeas

- Tailed copper, Lycaena arota
- Lustrous copper, Lycaena cupreus
  - Snow's lustrous copper, Lycaena cupreus snowi
- Gray copper, Lycaena dione
- Dorcas copper, Lycaena dorcas
  - Maine dorcas copper, Lycaena dorcas claytoni
  - Salt marsh dorcas copper, Lycaena dorcas dospassosi
- Edith's copper, Lycaena editha
- Bog copper, Lycaena epixanthe
- Gorgon copper, Lycaena gorgon
- Purplish copper, Lycaena helloides
- Hermes copper, Lycaena hermes
- Blue copper, Lycaena heteronea
- Bronze copper, Lycaena hyllus
- Mariposa copper, Lycaena mariposa
- Lilac-bordered copper, Lycaena nivalis
- American copper, Lycaena phlaeas
- Ruddy copper, Lycaena rubidus
  - White Mountains copper, Lycaena rubidus ferrisi
- Great copper, Lycaena xanthoides

== Subfamily Theclinae: hairstreaks ==
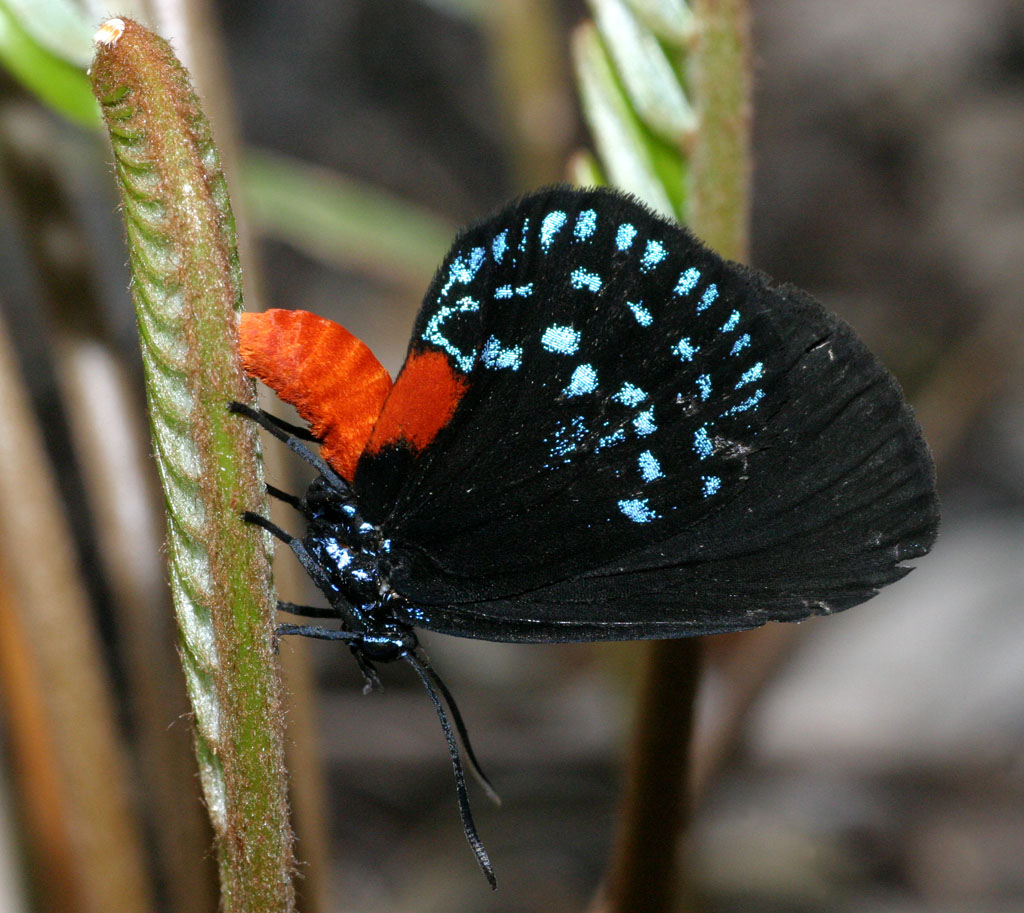
Atala, Eumaeus atala.

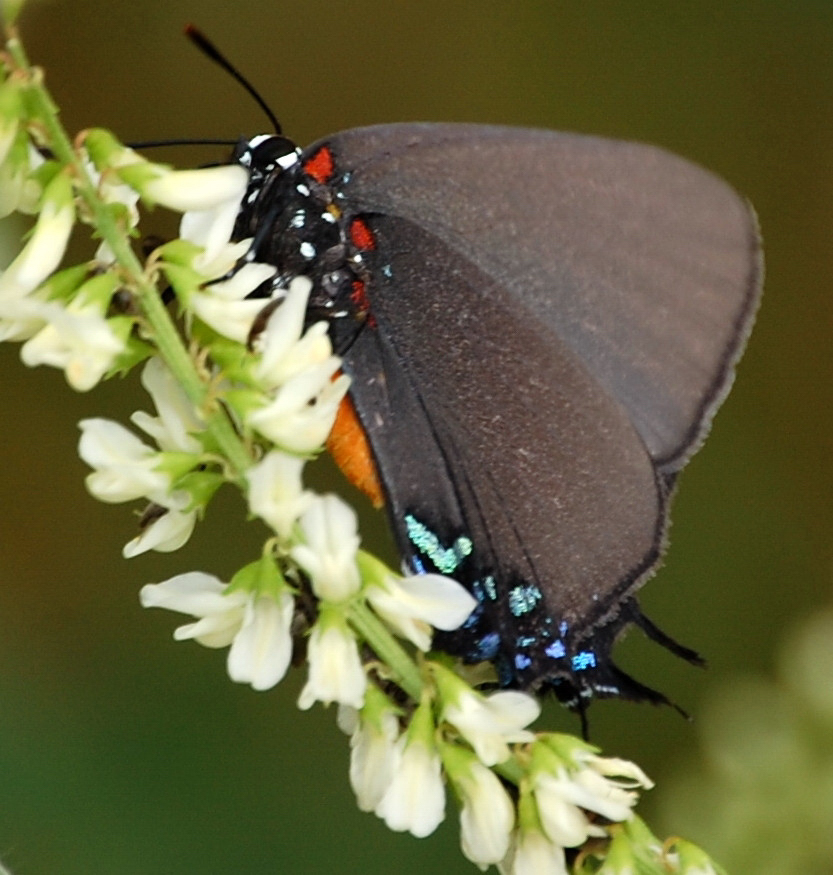
Great purple hairstreak, Atlides halesus

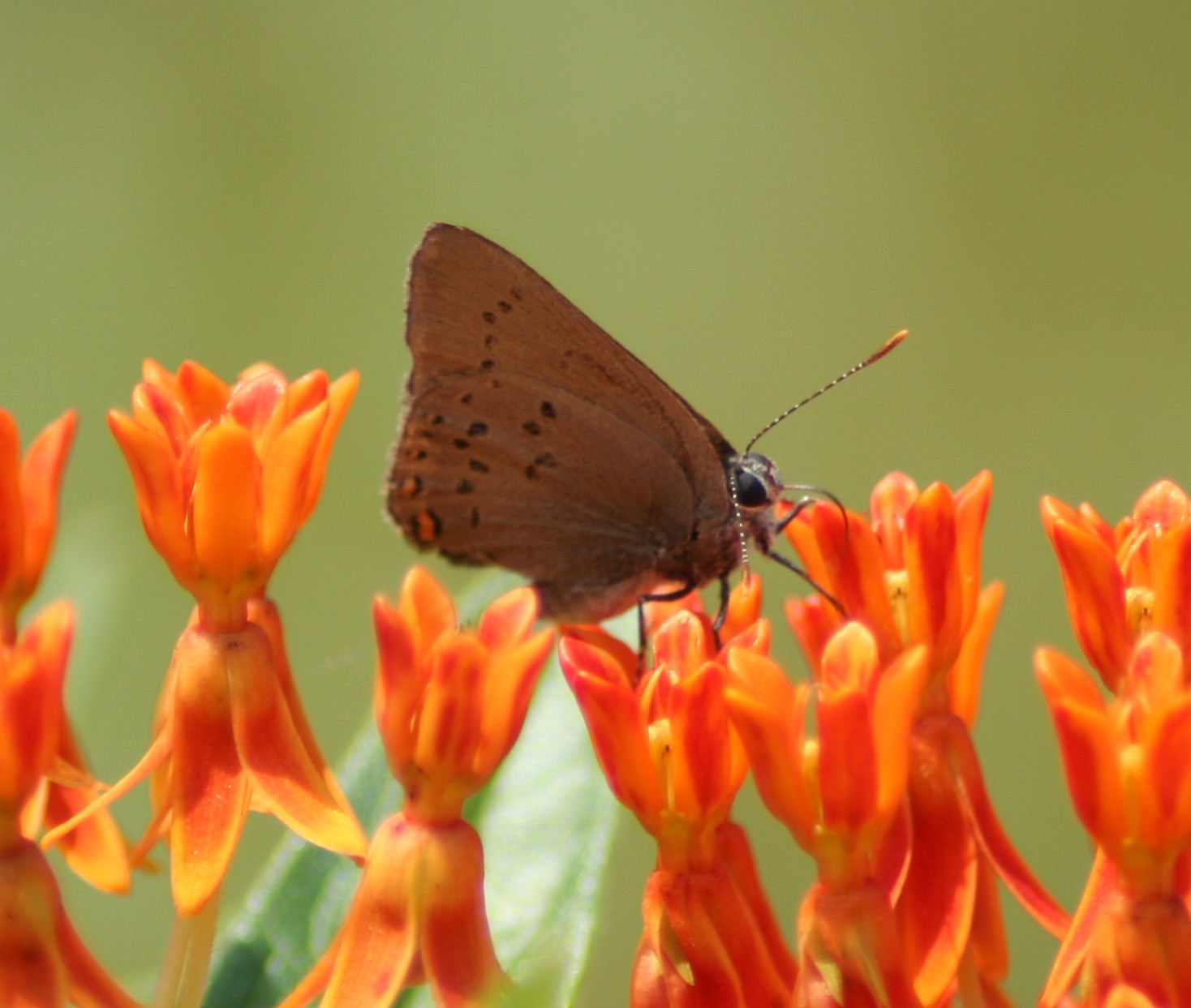
Coral hairstreak, Satyrium titus, on butterfly weed

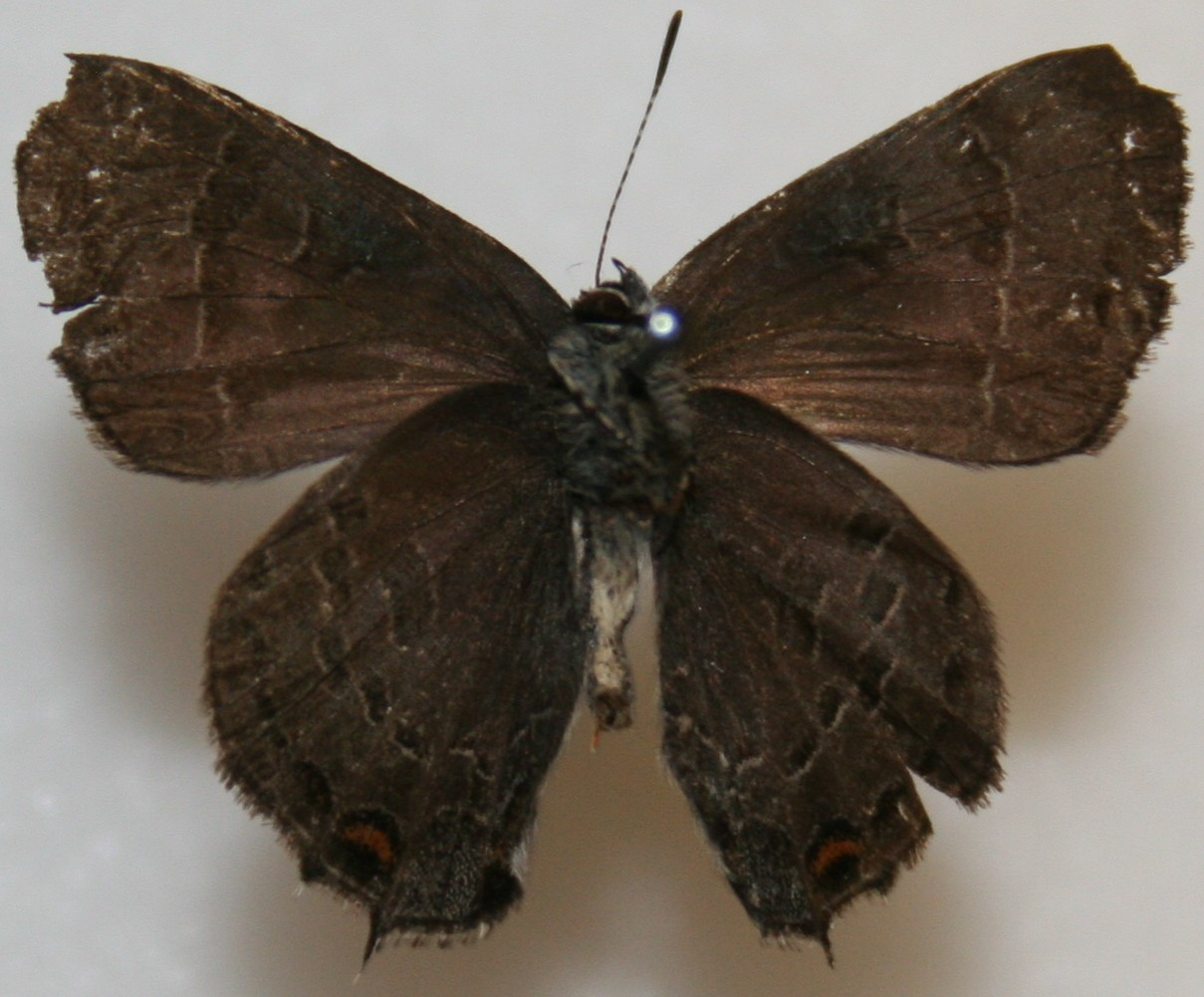
Banded hairstreak, Satyrium calanus

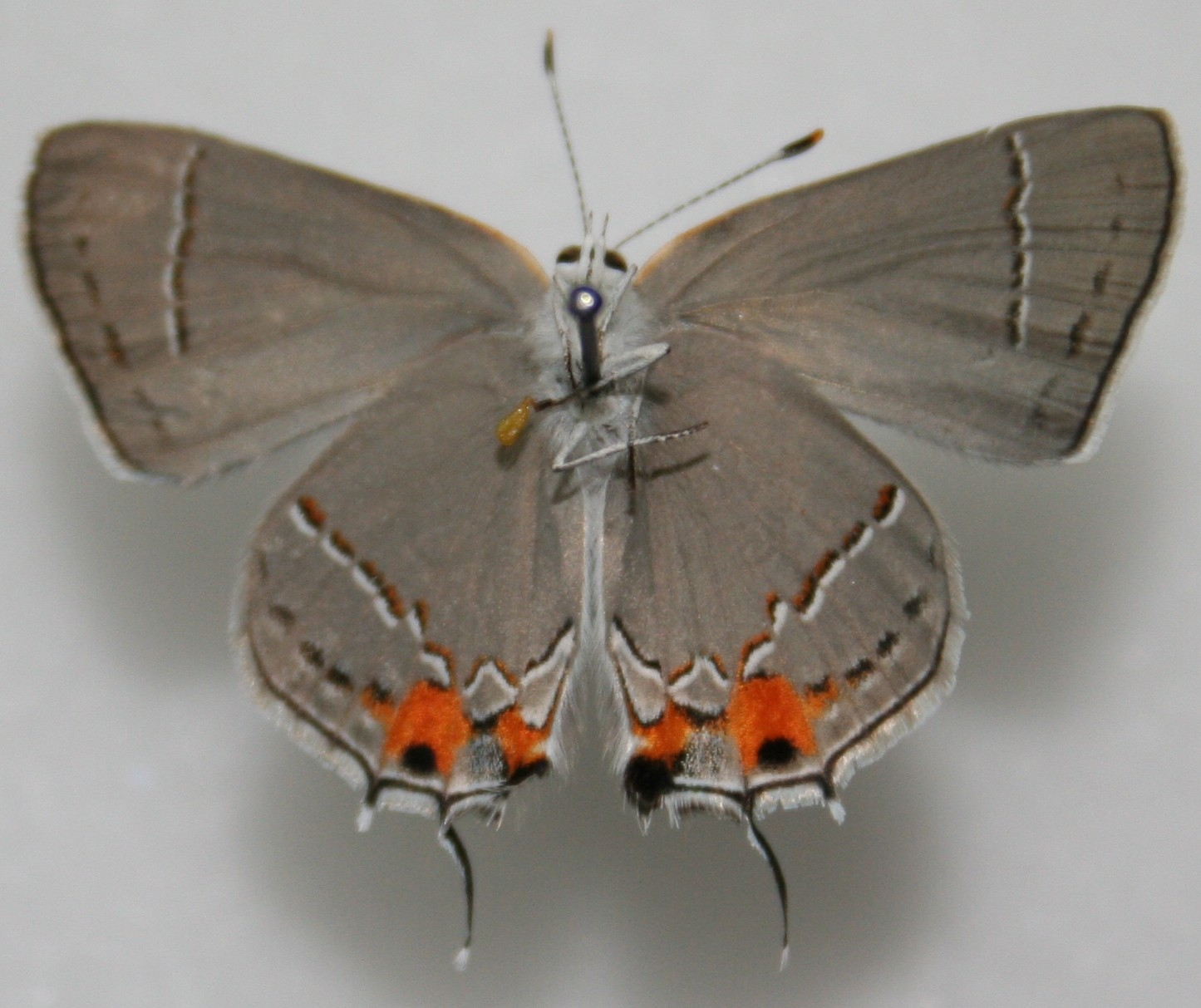
Gray hairstreak, Strymon melinus

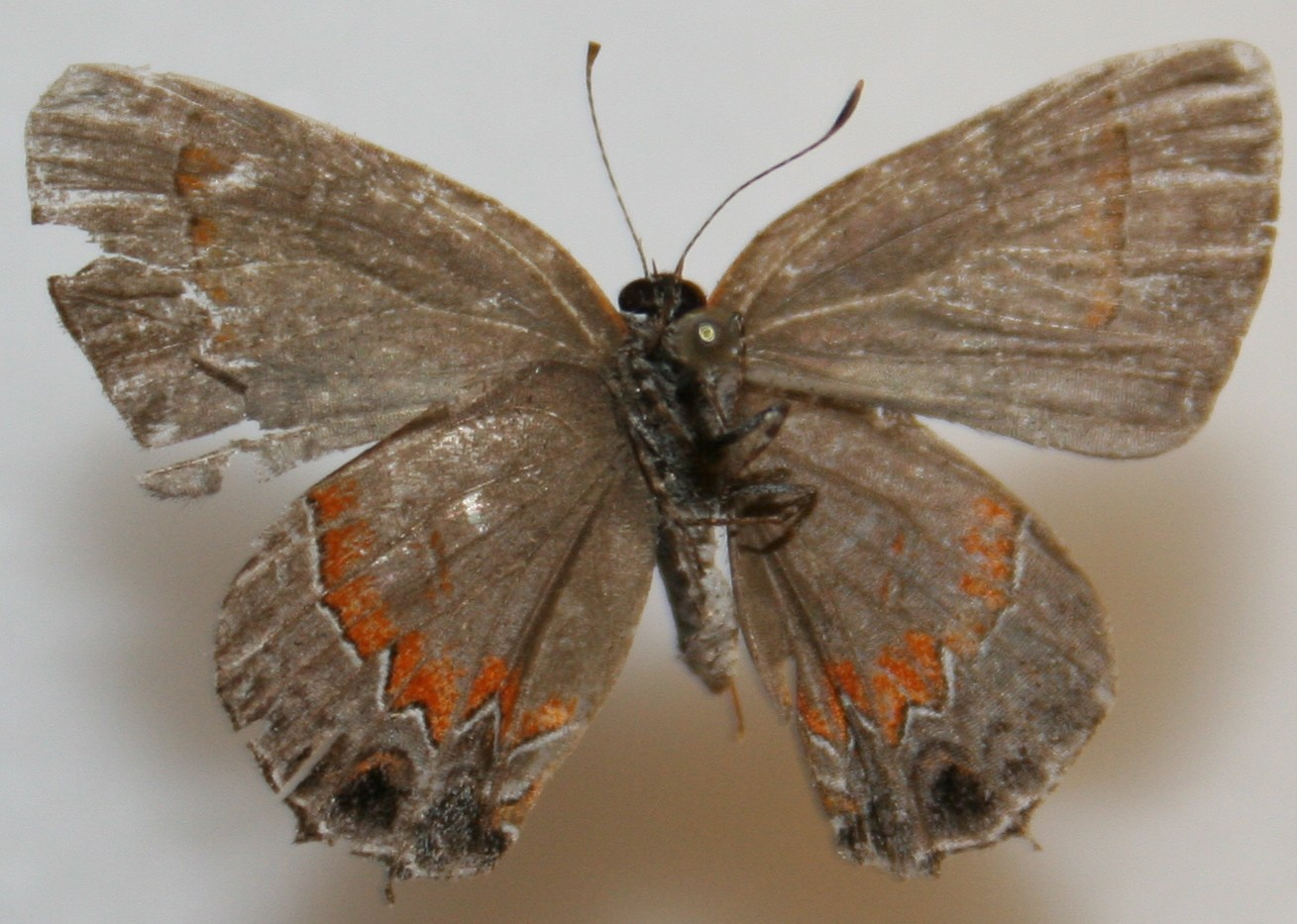
Red-banded hairstreak, Calycopis cecrops

- Colorado hairstreak, Hypaurotia crysalus
- Golden hairstreak, Habrodais grunus
- Atala, Eumaeus atala
- Superb cycadian, Eumaeus childrenae
- Strophius hairstreak, Allosmaitia strophius
- Great purple hairstreak, Atlides halesus
- Creamy stripe-streak, Arawacus jada
- Gold-bordered hairstreak, Rekoa palegon
- Smudged hairstreak, Rekoa stagira
- Marius hairstreak, Rekoa marius
- Black hairstreak, Ocaria ocrisia
- Amethyst hairstreak, Chlorostrymon maesites
- Telea hairstreak, Chlorostrymon telea
- Silver-banded hairstreak, Chlorostrymon simaethis
- Soapberry hairstreak, Phaeostrymon alcestis
- Coral hairstreak, Satyrium titus
- Behr's hairstreak, Satyrium behrii
- Sooty hairstreak, Satyrium fuliginosum
- Acadian hairstreak, Satyrium acadica
- California hairstreak, Satyrium californica
- Sylvan hairstreak, Satyrium sylvinus
- Edward's hairstreak, Satyrium edwardsii
- Banded hairstreak, Satyrium calanus
- Hickory hairstreak, Satyrium caryaevorum
- King's hairstreak, Satyrium kingi
- Striped hairstreak, Satyrium liparops
- Gold-hunter's hairstreak, Satyrium auretorum
- Mountain mahogany hairstreak, Satyrium tetra
- Hedgerow hairstreak, Satyrium saepium
- Oak hairstreak, Satyrium favonius
  - Southern oak hairstreak, Satyrium favonius favonius
  - Northern oak hairstreak, Satyrium favonius ontario
- Ilavia hairstreak, Satyrium ilavia
- Poling's hairstreak, Satyrium polingi
- Clench's greenstreak, Cyanophrys miserabilis
- Goodson's greenstreak, Cyanophrys goodsoni
- Cramer's greenstreak, Cyanophrys amyntor
- Tropical greenstreak, Cyanophrys herodotus
- Brown-spotted greenstreak, Cyanophrys longula
- Bramble hairstreak, Callophrys dumetorum
  - Bramble bramble hairstreak, Callophrys dumetorum dumetorum
  - Coastal bramble hairstreak, Callophrys dumetorum viridis
  - Canyon bramble hairstreak, Callophrys dumetorum apama
  - Immaculate bramble hairstreak, Callophys dumetorum affinis
- Sheridan's hairstreak, Callophrys sheridanii
  - White-lined Sheridan's hairstreak, Callophrys sheridanii sheridanii
  - Desert Sheridan's hairstreak, Callophrys sheridanii comstocki
  - Alpine Sheridan's hairstreak, Callophrys sheridanii lemberti
- Xami hairstreak, Callophrys xami
- Sandia hairstreak, Callophrys mcfarlandi
- Brown elfin, Callophrys augustinus
- Desert elfin, Callophrys fotis
- Moss's elfin, Callophrys mossii
- Hoary elfin, Callophrys polios
- Frosted elfin, Callophrys irus
- Henry's elfin, Callophrys henrici
- Bog elfin, Callophrys lanoraieensis
- Eastern pine elfin, Callophrys niphon
- Western pine elfin, Callophrys eryphon
- Thicket hairstreak, Callophrys spinetorum
- Johnson's hairstreak, Callophrys johnsoni
- Juniper hairstreak, Callophrys gryneus
  - Olive juniper hairstreak, Callophrys gryneus gryneus
  - Sweadner's juniper hairstreak, Callophrys gryneus sweadneri
  - Siva juniper hairstreak, Callophrys gryneus siva
  - Nelson's juniper hairstreak, Callophrys gryneus nelsoni
  - Muir's juniper hairstreak, Callophrys gryneus muiri
  - Loki's juniper hairstreak, Callophrys gryneus loki
  - Thorne's juniper hairstreak, Callophrys gryneus thornei
- Hessel's hairstreak, Callophrys hesseli
- Aquamarine hairstreak, Oenomaus ortygnus
- Broken-M hairstreak, Parrhasius polibetes
- White M hairstreak, Parrhasius m-album
- Mexican-M hairstreak, Parhassius moctezuma
- Gray hairstreak, Strymon melinus
- Avalon scrub-hairstreak, Strymon avalona
- Red-crescent scrub-hairstreak, Strymon rufofusca
- Red-lined scrub-hairstreak, Strymon bebrycia
- Martial scrub-hairstreak, Strymon martialis
- Yojoa scrub-hairstreak, Strymon yojoa
- White scrub-hairstreak, Strymon albata
- Bartram's scrub-hairstreak, Strymon acis
- Lacey's scrub-hairstreak, Strymon alea
- Mallow scrub-hairstreak, Strymon istapa
- Disguised scrub-hairstreak, Strymon limenia
- Tailless scrub-hairstreak, Strymon cestri
- Lantana scrub-hairstreak, Strymon bazochii
- Bromeliad scrub-hairstreak, Strymon serapio
- Confusing scrub-hairstreak, Strymon megarus
- Orange-crescent groundstreak, Ziegleria guzanta
- Ruddy hairstreak, Electrostrymon sangala
- Fulvous hairstreak, Electrostrymon angelia
- Muted hairstreak, Electrostrymon canus
- Red-banded hairstreak, Calycopis cecrops
- Dusky-blue groundstreak, Calycopis isobeon
- Susanna's groundstreak, Calycopis origo
- Red-spotted hairstreak, Tmolus echion
- Pearly-gray hairstreak, Siderus tephraeus
- Leda ministreak, Ministrymon leda
- Clytie ministreak, Ministrymon clytie
- Red-flocked ministreak, Ministrymon phrutus
- Gray ministreak, Ministrymon azia
- Vicroy's ministreak, Ministrymon janevicroy
- Sonoran hairstreak, Hypostrymon critola
- Early hairstreak, Erora laeta
- Arizona hairstreak, Erora quaderna

== Subfamily Polyommatinae: blues ==
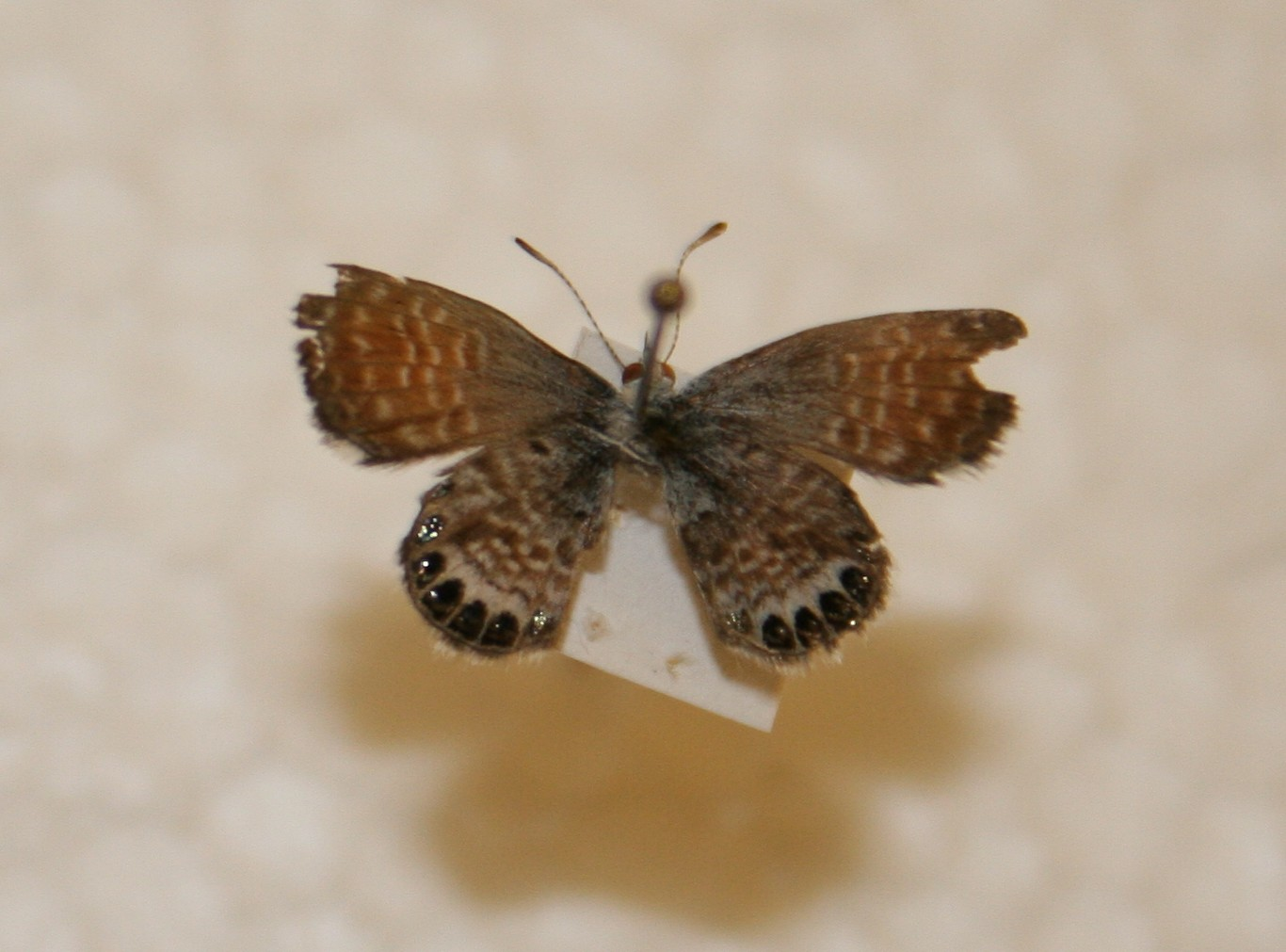
Western pygmy blue, Brephidium exilis

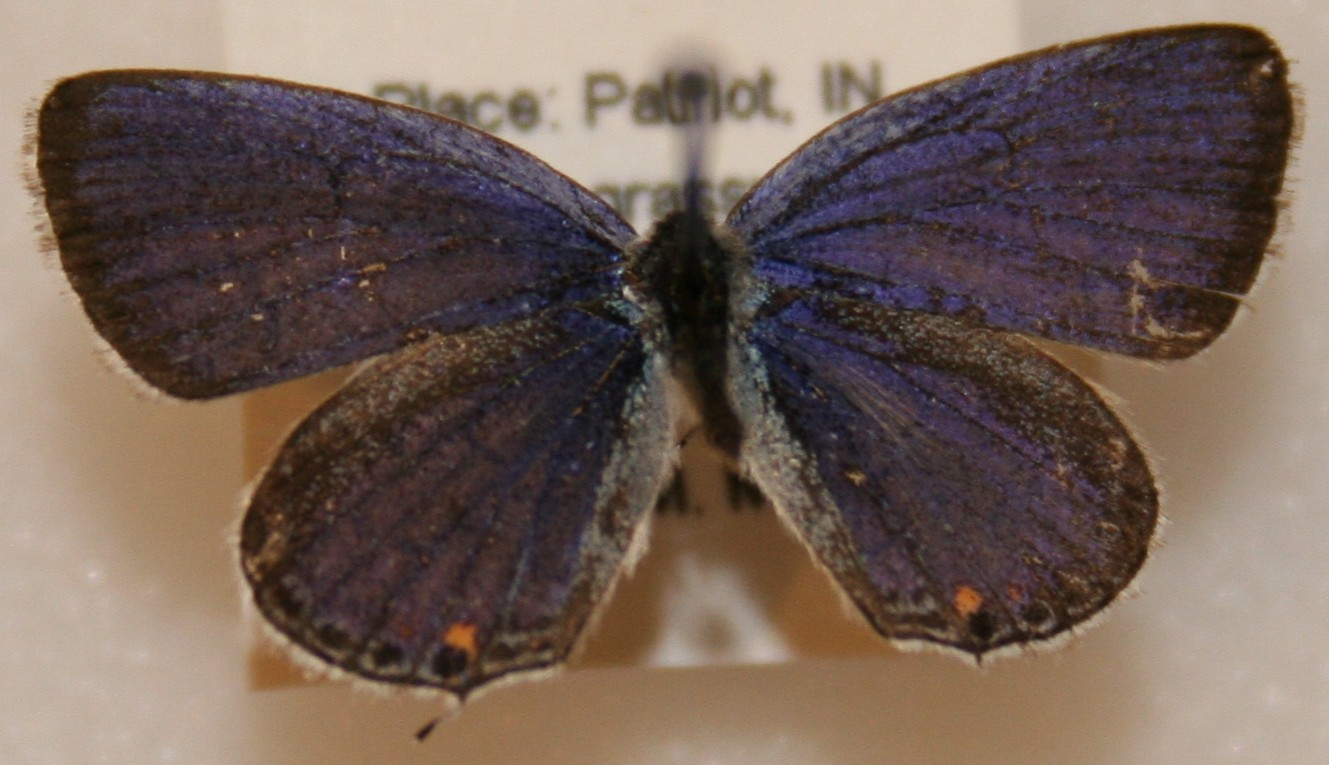
Male eastern tailed blue, Cupido comyntas

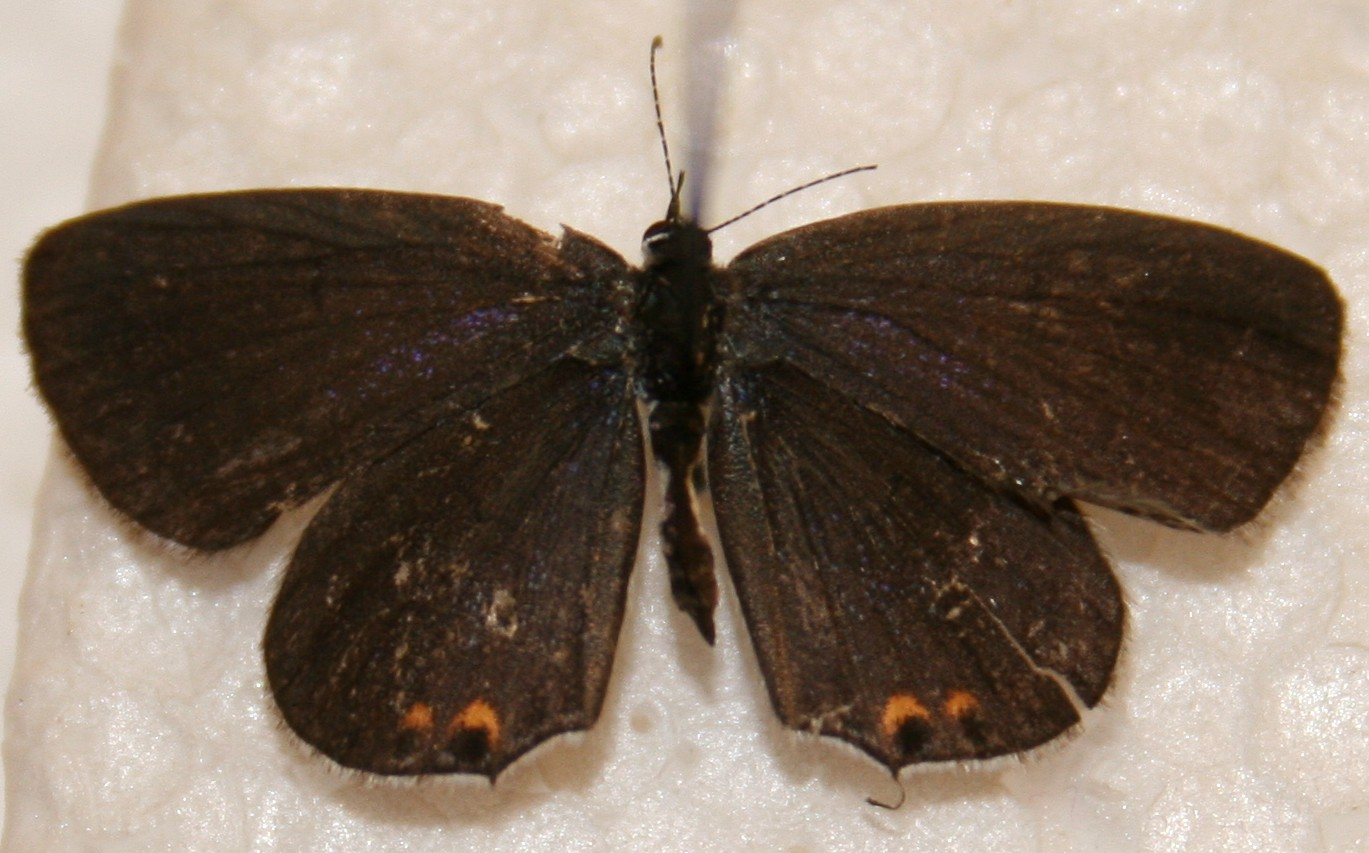
Female eastern tailed blue, Cupido comyntas

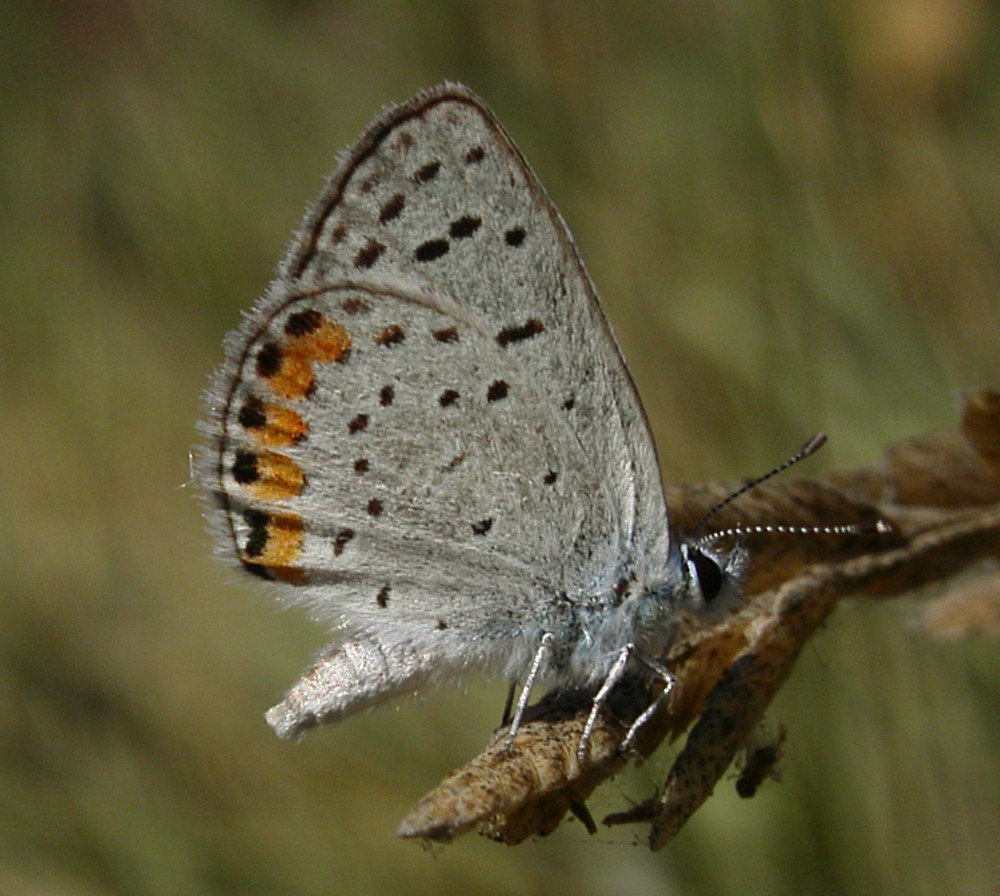
Acmon blue, Icaricia acmon

- Heather blue, Agriades cassiope
- Arctic blue, Agriades glandon
- Cranberry blue, Agriades optilete
- Sierra Nevada blue, Agriades podarce
- Western pygmy blue, Brephidium exilis
- Eastern pygmy blue, Brephidium isophthalma
- Echo azure, Celastrina echo
  - Baker's echo azure, Celastrina echo bakeri
  - Arizona echo azure, Celastrina echo cinerea
  - Mexican echo azure, Celastrina echo gozora
  - Dark echo azure, Celastrina echo nigrescens
  - Front Range echo azure, Celastrina echo sidara
- Hops azure, Celastrina humulus
- Holly azure, Celastrina idella
- Spring azure, Celastrina ladon
- Northern azure, Celastrina lucia
  - Colorado northern azure, Celastrina lucia lumarco
- Summer azure, Celastrina neglecta
  - Manitoba summer azure, Celastrina neglecta argentata
- Appalachian azure, Celastrina neglectamajor
- Dusky azure, Celastrina nigra
- Cherry gall azure, Celastrina serotina
- Western tailed-blue, Cupido amyntula
- Eastern tailed-blue, Cupido comyntas
- Nickerbean blue, Cyclargus ammon
- Miami blue, Cyclargus thomasi
- Reakirt's blue, Echinargus isola
- Square-spotted blue, Euphilotes battoides
  - El Segundo square-spotted blue, Euphilotes battoides allyni
  - Bauer's square-spotted blue, Euphilotes battoides baueri
  - Bernardino square-spotted blue, Euphilotes battoides bernardino
  - Central square-spotted blue, Euphilotes battoides centralis
  - Ellis's square-spotted blue, Euphilotes battoides ellisi
  - Euphilotes battoides intermedia
- Dotted blue, Euphilotes enoptes
  - Ancilla dotted blue, Euphilotes enoptes ancilla
  - Dammer's dotted blue, Euphilotes enoptes dammersi
  - Mojave dotted blue, Euphilotes enoptes mojave
- Rita blue, Euphilotes rita
  - Pale Rita blue, Euphilotes rita pallescens
- Spalding's blue, Euphilotes spaldingi
- Silvery blue, Glaucopsyche lygdamus
- Arrowhead blue, Glaucopsyche piasus
- Ceraunus blue, Hemiargus ceraunus
- Acmon blue, Icaricia acmon
- Boisduval's blue, Icaricia icarioides
  - Mission Boisduval's blue, Icaricia icarioides missionensis
- Lupine blue, Icaricia lupini
- Veined blue, Icaricia neurona
- Greenish blue, Icaricia saepiolus
- Shasta blue, Icaricia shasta
- Pea blue, Lampides boeticus
- Cassius blue, Leptotes cassius
- Marine blue, Leptotes marina
- Sonoran blue, Philotes sonorensis
- Small blue, Philotiella speciosa
  - Philotiella speciosa leona
- Northern blue, Plebejus idas
- Melissa blue, Plebejus melissa
  - Karner Melissa blue, Plebejus melissa samuelis
- San Emigdio blue, Plebulina emigdionis
- Cyna blue, Zizula cyna
- Lesser grass-blue, Zizina otis
