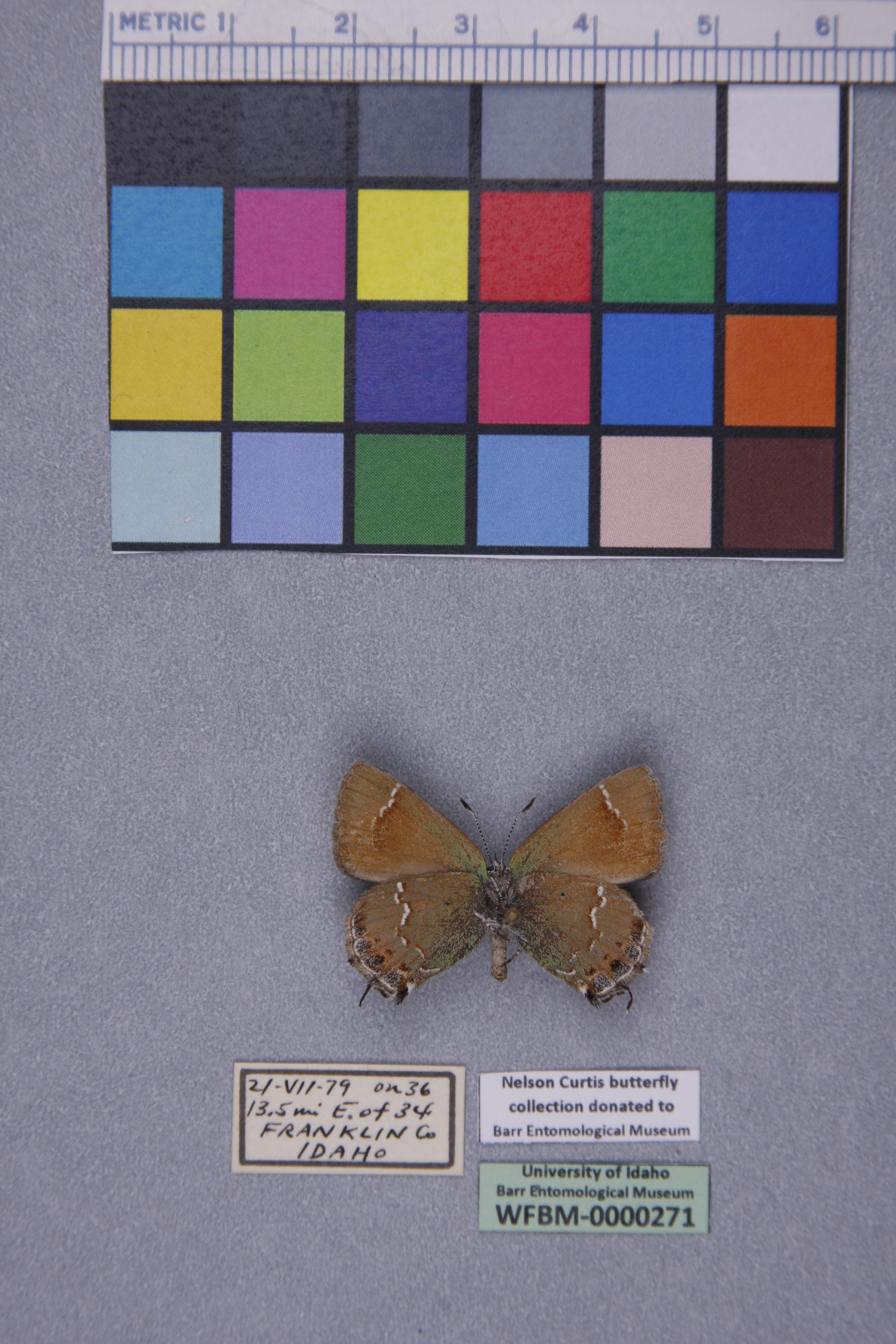
- Mitoura rosneri rosneri

Scientific classification
- Kingdom: Animalia
- Phylum: Arthropoda
- Class: Insecta
- Order: Lepidoptera
- Family: Lycaenidae
- Genus: Mitoura
- Species: M. rosneri

Binomial name
- Mitoura rosneri Johnson, 1976

Synonyms
- Mitoura (Callophrys) barryi Johnson, 1976

= Mitoura rosneri =

Species of butterfly

Mitoura rosneri, the Rosner's hairstreak, is a butterfly of the family Lycaenidae. It is found in western North America in British Columbia. (Note: Registry-Migration.Gbif.Org (2021). "Mitoura rosneri (Johnson, 1976)". Global Biodiversity Information Facility (in British English and Latin). doi:10.15468/39omei.) and Washington state. Subspecies Mitoura rosneri plicataria is known as Barry's hairstreak.

The wingspan is 21–27 mm (0.83–1.06 in).

The larvae of subspecies M. r. rosneri feed on western red cedar (Thuja plicata), while the larvae of subspecies M. r. plicataria feed on Rocky Mountain juniper (Juniperus scopulorum).

== Subspecies ==
- Mitoura rosneri rosneri — Rosner's hairstreak (interior ranges of British Columbia)
- Mitoura rosneri plicataria Johnson, 1976 — Barry's hairstreak (Vancouver Island and Coast Range of British Columbia, Washington)

== Taxonomy ==
Both M. r. rosneri and M. r. plicataria are often treated as subspecies of Callophrys gryneus. Callophrys barryi is a synonym of C. r. plicataria. (Note: "Callophrys gryneus plicataria". Butterflies of America.)
