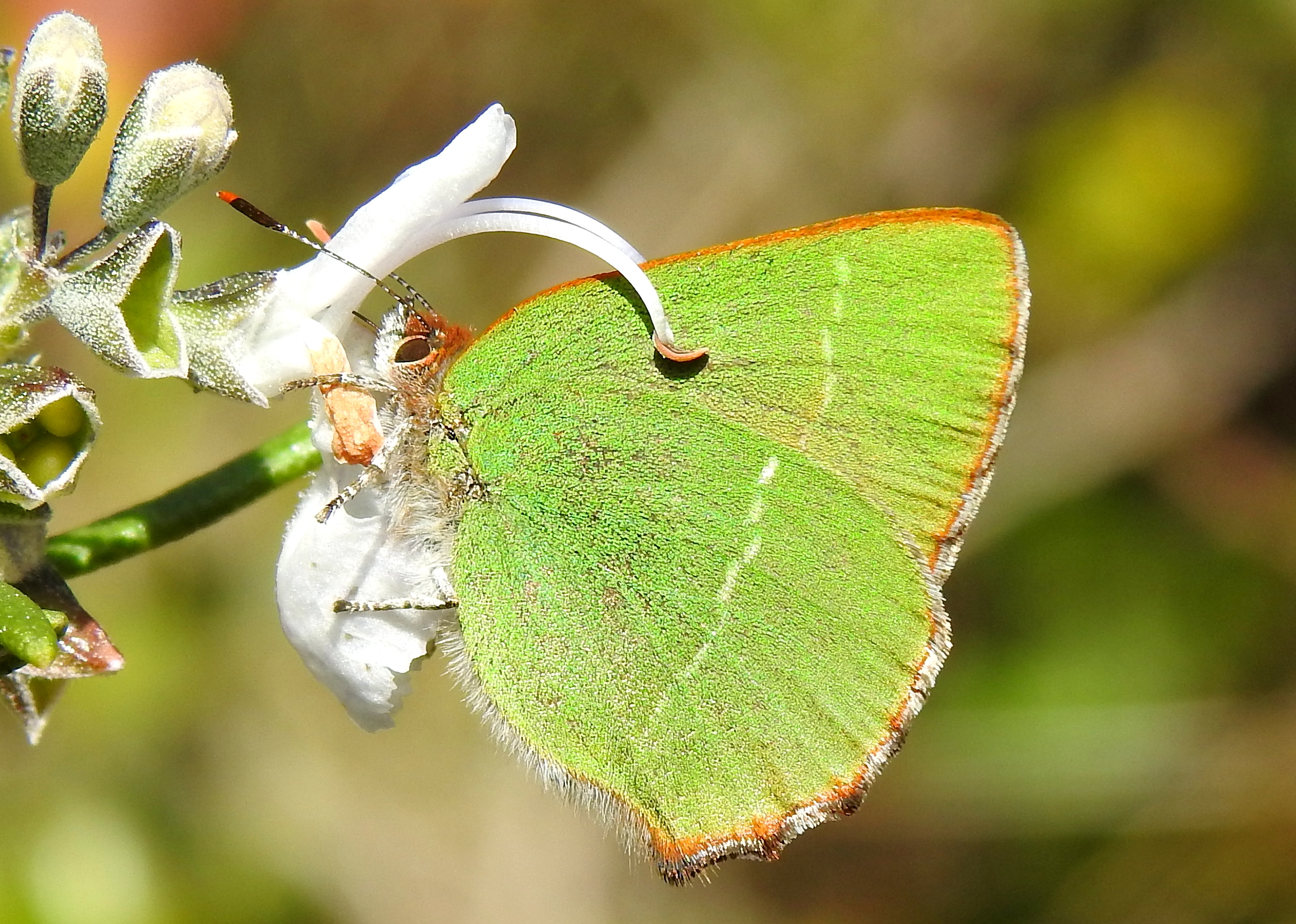

Scientific classification
- Kingdom: Animalia
- Phylum: Arthropoda
- Clade: Pancrustacea
- Class: Insecta
- Order: Lepidoptera
- Family: Lycaenidae
- Genus: Callophrys
- Species: C. avis

Binomial name
- Callophrys avis Chapman, 1909

= Callophrys avis =

Species of butterfly

Callophrys avis, the Chapman's green hairstreak is a small butterfly found in the Palearctic (Southwest Europe, Algeria, Morocco, Tunisia) that belongs to the blues family. The males and females of this little butterfly are identical. The underside of the wings is green, the upperside is greyish brown. The green verso is marked by a mediodistal white line that differentiates this species from Callophrys rubi. The larva feeds on Coriaria myrtifolia, Arbutus unedo, Salvia verbenaca, Viburnum tinus.

== See also ==
- List of butterflies of Europe
