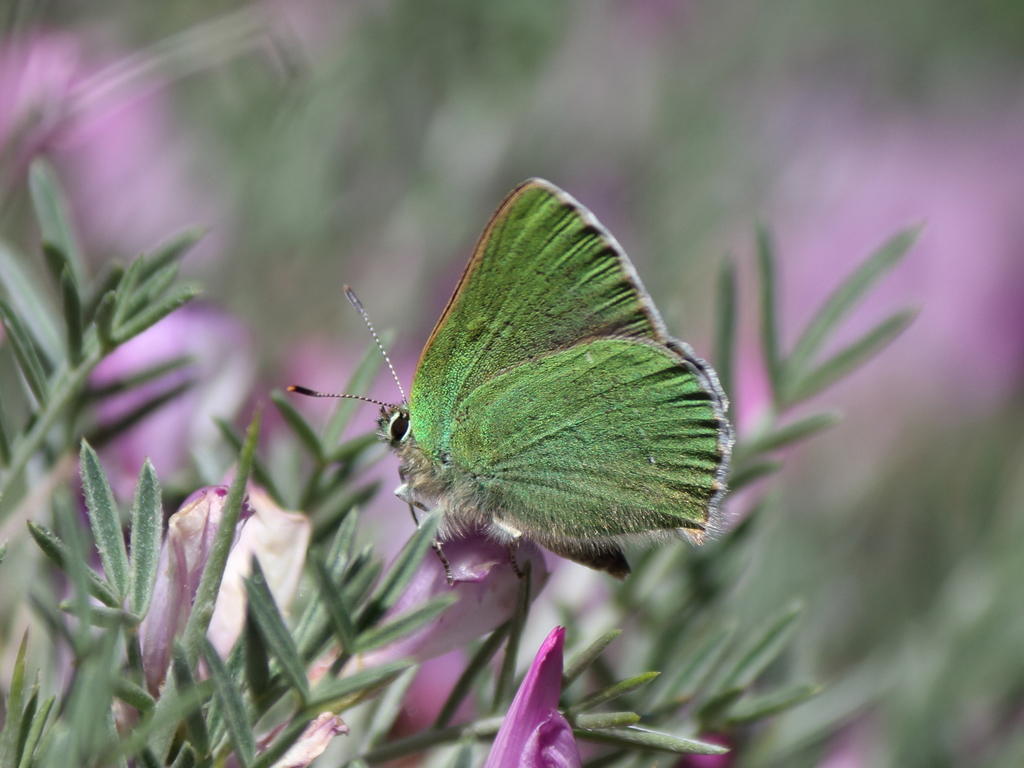

Scientific classification
- Kingdom: Animalia
- Phylum: Arthropoda
- Class: Insecta
- Order: Lepidoptera
- Family: Lycaenidae
- Genus: Callophrys
- Species: C. paulae

Binomial name
- Callophrys paulae Pfeiffer, 1932

= Callophrys paulae =

Pfeiffer's green hairstreak

Species of butterfly

Callophrys paulae, the Pfeiffer's green hairstreak, is a butterfly of the family Lycaenidae. It is found on the Asia Minor, northern Iran, southern Transcaucasia, and the Talysh Mountains.

The wingspan is 25–30 mm. The species inhabits calcareous grasslands usually dominated by tragacanth locoweeds. It occupies elevation range from 1200 to 2200 m above sea level. The butterfly flies from mid-May to end of June depending on latitude and elevation.

The larvae feed on Onobrychis cornuta.

== Subspecies ==
- Callophrys paulae paulae
- Callophrys paulae kolak Higgins, 1965 (Talysh Mountains)
