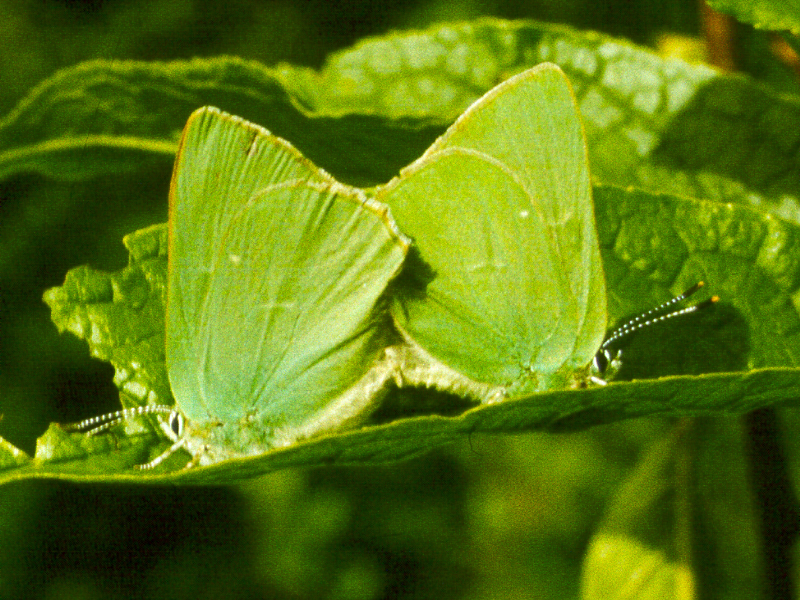

Scientific classification
- Kingdom: Animalia
- Phylum: Arthropoda
- Class: Insecta
- Order: Lepidoptera
- Family: Lycaenidae
- Genus: Callophrys
- Species: C. suaveola

Binomial name
- Callophrys suaveola (Staudinger, 1881)

= Callophrys suaveola =

Species of butterfly

Callophrys suaveola is a small butterfly found in the Palearctic (Russia - Dzhungarsky Alatau, Tarbagatai, Saur, Altai) that belongs to the blues family.

== Description from Seitz ==
suaveola Stgr. (72 f), from Central Asia, is as large as the largest European specimens [of Callophrys rubi], the upperside darker, the underside deeper green. From Saisan and Lepsa; as true rubi also occurs in these localities, suaveola may turn out to be the summer-brood.

== See also ==
- List of butterflies of Europe
