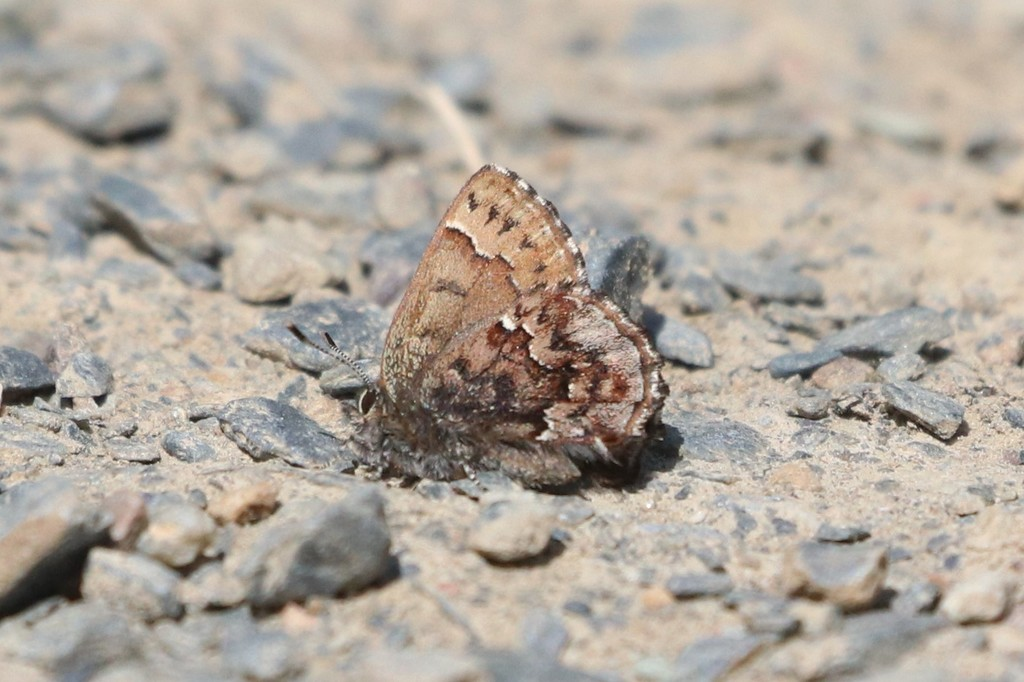

Scientific classification
- Domain: Eukaryota
- Kingdom: Animalia
- Phylum: Arthropoda
- Class: Insecta
- Order: Lepidoptera
- Family: Lycaenidae
- Genus: Callophrys
- Species: C. lanoraieensis

Binomial name
- Callophrys lanoraieensis (Sheppard, 1934)

Synonyms
- Incisalia lanoraieensis Sheppard, 1934

= Callophrys lanoraieensis =

Bog elfin

Species of butterfly

Callophrys lanoraieensis, the bog elfin, is a species of Lycaenidae that is native to North America.

== Description ==
The wingspan ranges from 16 to 19 mm (0.63 to 0.75 in). It is a dull brown and tailless.

The caterpillars eat black spruce (Picea mariana).

== Range ==
They range from eastern New Hampshire through coastal Maine north to New Brunswick. Isolated populations in eastern Ontario, southern Quebec, Nova Scotia, and Maine, and rare in New York and Massachusetts. Within this range they tend to black spruce and tamarack bogs.

== Similar species ==
- Eastern pine elfin (C. niphon)
