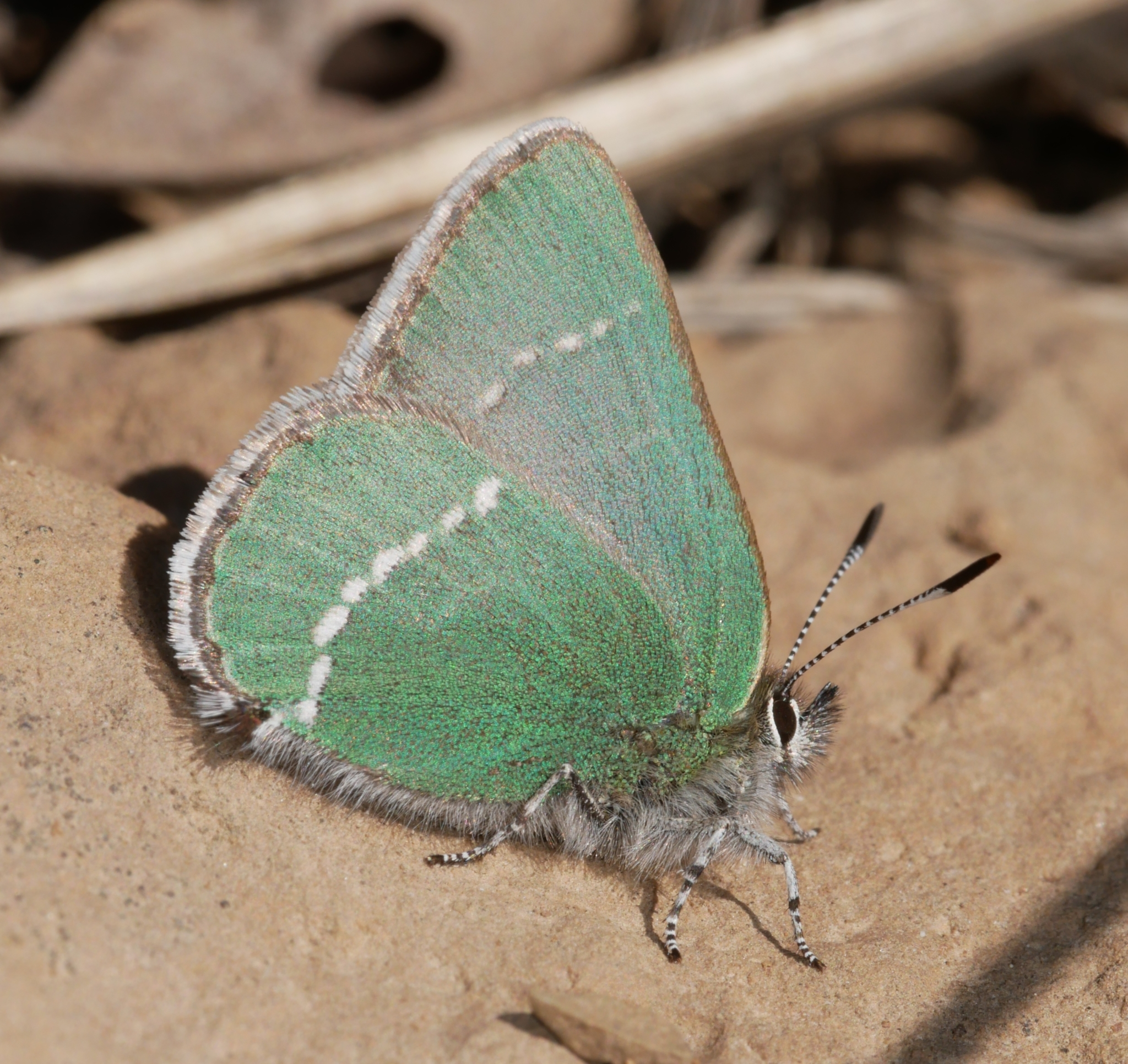
- Callophrys sheridanii

Scientific classification
- Kingdom: Animalia
- Phylum: Arthropoda
- Clade: Pancrustacea
- Class: Insecta
- Order: Lepidoptera
- Family: Lycaenidae
- Tribe: Eumaeini
- Genus: Callophrys; Billberg, 1820

Species
- See text

Synonyms
- Ahlbergia Bryk, 1946; Cisincisalia; Cissatsuma Johnson, 1992; Deciduphagus K.Johnson, 1992; Ginzia Okano, 1947; Incisalia Scudder, 1872; Loranthomitoura Ballmer & Pratt, 1992; Mitoura Scudder, 1872; Novosatsuma Johnson, 1992; Sandia Clench & Ehrlich, 1960; Xamia; but see text

= Callophrys =

Genus of butterflies

The genus Callophrys consists of butterflies in the family Lycaenidae. It is apparently not monophyletic, but which of the taxa currently considered junior synonyms of Callophrys are valid genera remains to be determined.

The Asian and European members of this genus and some North American species are commonly known as green hairstreaks, and the North American species in the subgenus Incisalia are called elfins.

== Species ==
Listed alphabetically within groups.

Subgenus Callophrys Billberg, 1820:

- Callophrys afghana Krupitsky, Pljushtch & Pak, 2012
- Callophrys armeniaca Zhdanko, 1998
- Callophrys avis Chapman, 1909 – Chapman's green hairstreak
- Callophrys butlerovi (Migranov, 1992)
- Callophrys chalybeitincta Sovinsky, 1905
- Callophrys davisi (Watson & Comstock, 1920)
- Callophrys danchenkoi Zhdanko, 1998
- Callophrys foulquieri (Rivertigat, 1915)
- Callophrys hatuma Zhdanko, 1996
- Callophrys mystaphia Miller, 1913 – rhubarb hairstreak
- Callophrys paulae Pfeiffer, 1932
- Callophrys perplexa Barnes & Benjamin, 1923
- Callophrys rubi (Linnaeus, 1758) – green hairstreak
- Callophrys suaveola (Staudinger, 1881)
- Callophrys titanus Zhdanko, 1998

Subgenus Cisincisalia Johnson, 1992:

- Callophrys guatemalena Clench, 1981
- Callophrys johnsoni (Skinner, 1904) – Johnson's hairstreak
- Callophrys spinetorum (Hewitson, 1867) – thicket hairstreak

Subgenus Greenie Grishin, 2021:

- Callophrys affinis (W. H. Edwards, 1862) – western green hairstreak, immaculate green hairstreak
- Callophrys dumetorum (Boisduval, 1852) – bramble hairstreak
- Callophrys sheridanii (W. H. Edwards, 1877) – Sheridan's hairstreak, white-lined green hairstreak
- Callophrys viridis (W. H. Edwards, 1877) – coastal green hairstreak

Subgenus Incisalia Scudder, 1872:

- Callophrys augustinus (Westwood, 1852) – brown elfin
- Callophrys eryphon (Boisduval, 1852) – western pine elfin
- Callophrys fotis (Strecker, 1878) – early elfin
- Callophrys henrici (Grote & Robinson, 1867) – Henry's elfin
- Callophrys irus (Godart, 1824) – frosted elfin
- Callophrys lanoraieensis Sheppard, 1934 – bog elfin
- Callophrys mossii (H. Edwards, 1881) – Moss's elfin, stonecrop elfin, Schryver's elfin
- Callophrys niphon (Hübner, 1819) – eastern pine elfin
- Callophrys polios Cook & Watson, 1907 – hoary elfin

Per Zhang et al., 2021 also including former Subgenus Sandia Clench & Ehrlich, 1960:

- Callophrys mcfarlandi Ehrlich & Clench, 1960 – Sandia hairstreak

Per Zhang et al., 2021 also including former Subgenus Xamia Clench, 1961:

- Callophrys xami (Reakirt, 1867) – xami hairstreak (southern Arizona and Texas south to Guatemala)
- Callophrys scaphia Clench, 1981

Subgenus Mitoura Scudder, 1872:

- Callophrys dospassosi Clench, 1981
- Callophrys estela Clench, 1981
- Callophrys gryneus (Hübner, 1819) – olive hairstreak, juniper hairstreak
- Callophrys hesseli (Rawson & Ziegler, 1950) – Hessel's hairstreak
- Callophrys loki (Skinner, 1907) – Loki's hairstreak
- Callophrys muiri (H. Edwards, 1881) – Muir's hairstreak

Others of debatable status in several schemes as subspecies or synonyms:

- Callophrys barryi (K. Johnson, 1976) – Barry's hairstreak
- Callophrys rosneri (Johnson, 1976) – Rosner's hairstreak, cedar hairstreak
- Callophrys thornei (Brown, 1983) – Thorne's hairstreak

See also in some schemes with "Subgenus" Ahlbergia Bryk, 1946

- Callophrys aleucopuncta K. Johnson, 1992
- Callophrys arquata K. Johnson, 1992
- Callophrys bimaculata K. Johnson, 1992
- Callophrys caerulea K. Johnson, 1992
- Callophrys caesius K. Johnson, 1992
- Callophrys chalcidis I. Chou & H.H. Li, 1994
- Callophrys chalybeia (Leech, 1890)
- Callophrys circe (Leech, 1893)
- Callophrys clarofacia (K. Johnson, 1992)
- Callophrys clarolinea (H. Huang & A.M. Chen, 2006)
- Callophrys confusa (H. Huang, Z. Chen & M. Li, 2006)
- Callophrys distincta H. Huang, 2003
- Callophrys dongyui (H. Huang & C.H. Zhan, 2006)
- Callophrys ferrea (Butler, 1866)
- Callophrys frivaldszkyi (Lederer, 1855)
- Callophrys haradai (Igarashi, 1973)
- Callophrys hsui (K. Johnson, 2000)
- Callophrys huertasblancae (K. Yoshino, 2016)
- Callophrys korea K. Johnson, 1992
- Callophrys leechii (de Nicéville, [1893])
- Callophrys leechuanlungi (H. Huang & Y.C. Chen, 2005)
- Callophrys leei (K. Johnson, 1992)
- Callophrys luoliangi (H. Huang & K. Song, 2006)
- Callophrys lynda (K. Johnson, 1992)
- Callophrys nicevillei (Leech, 1893)
- Callophrys pictila K. Johnson, 1992
- Callophrys pluto (Leech, 1893)
- Callophrys prodiga K. Johnson, 1992
- Callophrys unicolora K. Johnson, 1992
- Callophrys zhujianhuai H. Huang & C.S. Wu, 2003
