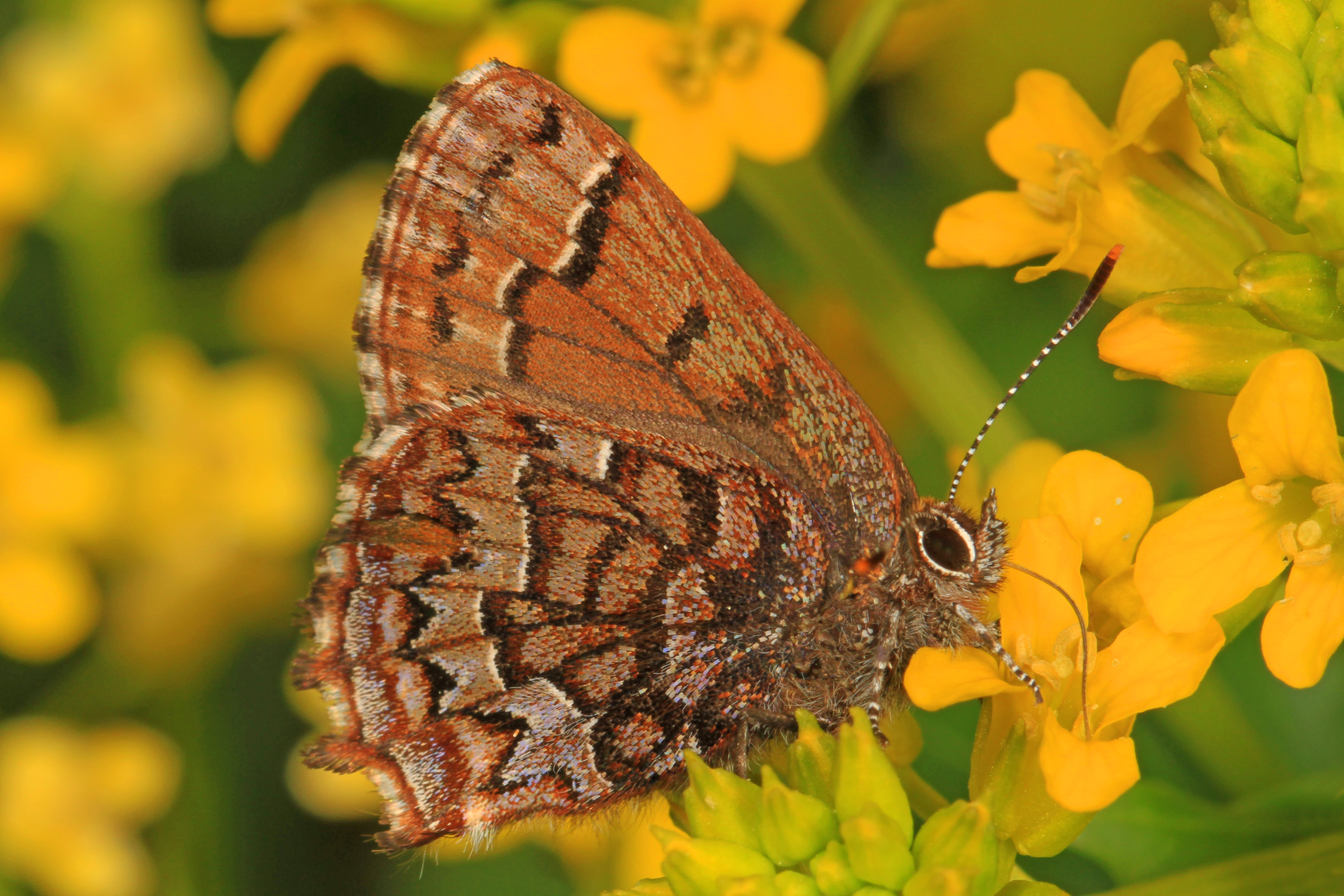

Conservation status
- Secure (NatureServe)

Scientific classification
- Domain: Eukaryota
- Kingdom: Animalia
- Phylum: Arthropoda
- Class: Insecta
- Order: Lepidoptera
- Family: Lycaenidae
- Genus: Callophrys
- Species: C. niphon

Binomial name
- Callophrys niphon (Hübner, 1823)

Synonyms
- Licus niphon Hübner, 1823; Incisalia niphon; Callophrys niphon clarki Freeman, 1938

= Callophrys niphon =

Eastern pine elfin

Species of butterfly

Callophrys niphon, the eastern pine elfin, is a species of Lycaenidae that is native to North America.

== Description ==
It is similar to the western pine elfin but has two dark bars instead of one in the forewing underside cell with strong patterning on the underside. The wingspan ranges from 22–27 mm (0.87–1.06 in).

== Life history ==
There is one flight from March to April in the south, while it occurs between mid-May and early June in the north. Females will lay eggs singly on flower buds. The caterpillars eat both the flower and the developing seedpods. Chrysalids hibernate in loosely formed cocoons beneath litter below the plant. Larval foods include jack pine (Pinus banksiana) and white pine (Pinus strobus).

== Range ==
They range across most of the eastern United States and the southern parts of the provinces of Canada. Within this range they tend to sandy areas with pine trees.
