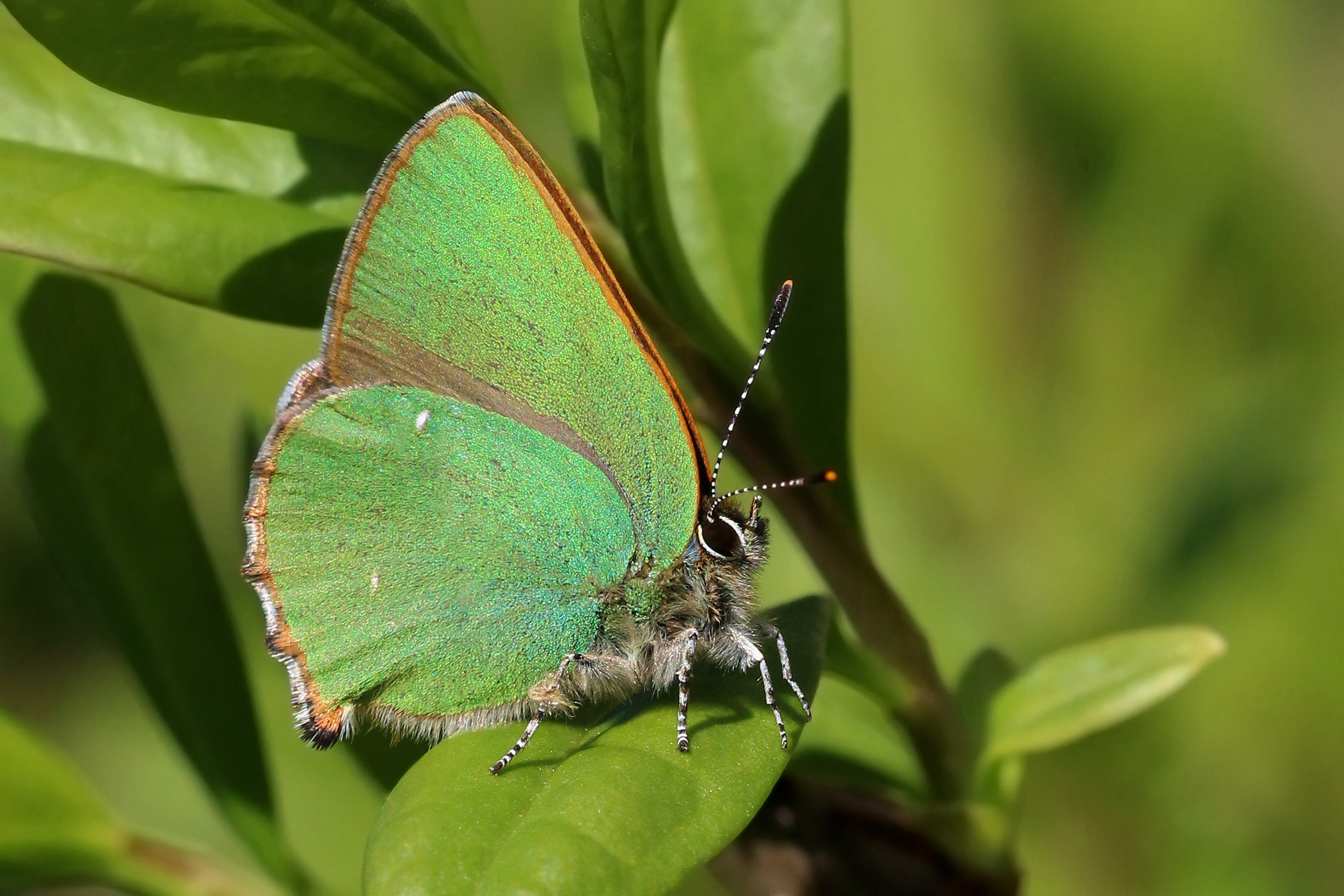
- Near Aston Upthorpe, Oxfordshire, England
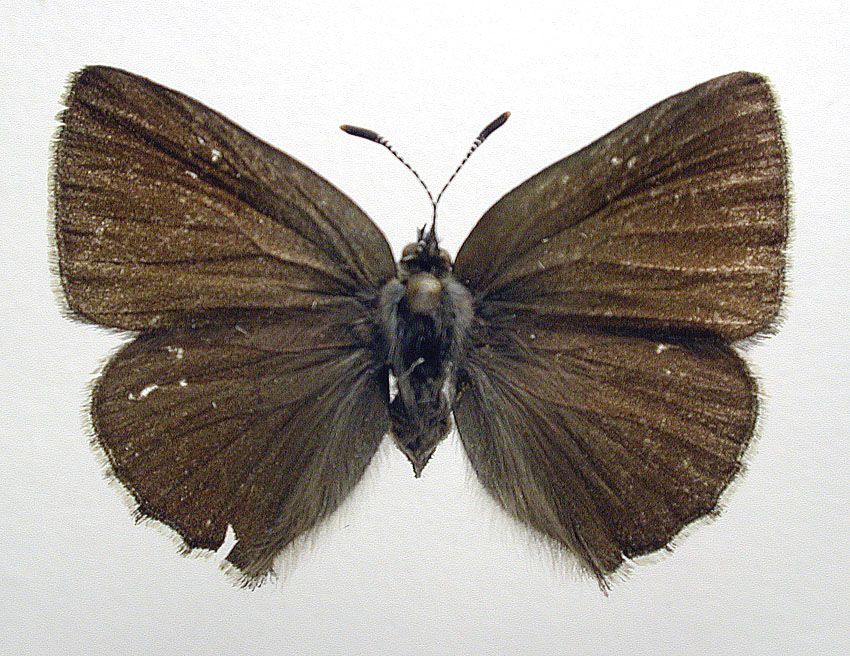

Scientific classification
- Kingdom: Animalia
- Phylum: Arthropoda
- Clade: Pancrustacea
- Class: Insecta
- Order: Lepidoptera
- Family: Lycaenidae
- Genus: Callophrys
- Species: C. rubi

Binomial name
- Callophrys rubi (Linnaeus, 1758)

= Green hairstreak =

Species of butterfly

The green hairstreak (Callophrys rubi) is a small butterfly in the family Lycaenidae.

== Etymology ==
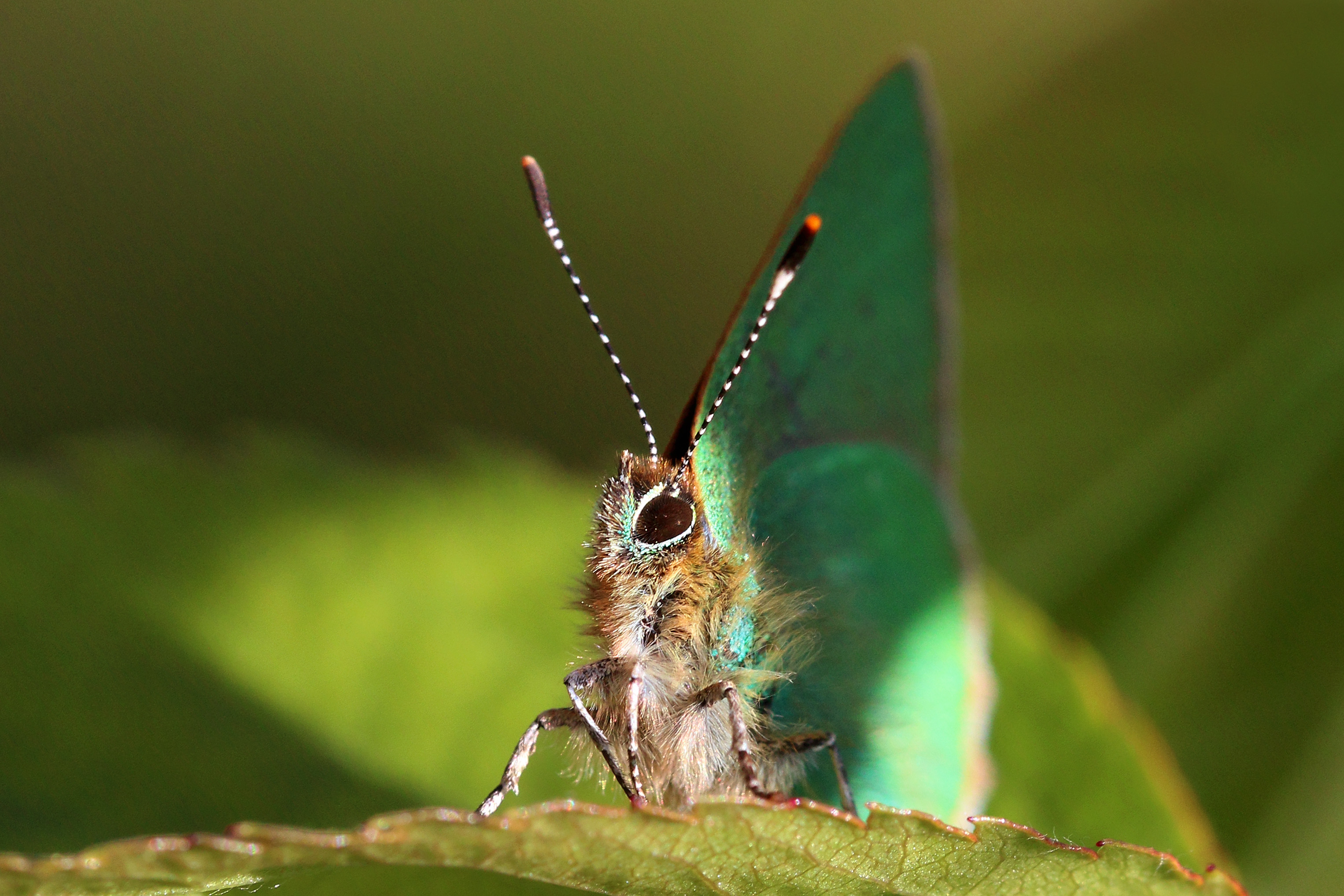
Close up of body, WWT London Wetland Centre, Barnes

The genus name Callophrys is a Greek word meaning "beautiful eyebrows", while the species Latin name rubi derives from Rubus (bramble), one of the host plants.

== Subspecies ==
- Callophrys rubi borealis (Krulikovsky, 1890) Urals
- Callophrys rubi fervida (Staudinger, 1901) Iberian Peninsula, Morocco, Asia Minor
- Callophrys rubi martinae ten Hagen, 2012 Iran
- Callophrys rubi rubi Europe, Caucasus, Kopet Dag
- Callophrys rubi sibirica (Rühl, 1895) Tien-Shan, Altai, Siberia, Transbaikalia, Far East, Amur (Outer Manchuria), Ussuri and Sakhalin.

== Description ==
Callophrys rubi has a wingspan reaching about 26–30 millimetres (1.0–1.2 in) in length. The oversides of the wings are a uniform dull brown, with two paler patches on the male's forewings made up of scent scales. The undersides are a bright green with a thin white line, often reduced to a faint row of dots or even missing altogether. The iridescent green colour of the undersides is a structural colour caused by diffraction and interference of light by microscopic repeating structures forming a diffraction grating in the wing scales. The caterpillars are green with yellow markings along the back. Like other members of the family they are rather sluglike.

== Description in Seitz ==
T. rubi L. (72 e). Above black-brown with white fringes; male with a scent-patch on the forewing below the costa in the centre. Beneath green, with some white dots on the disc of the hindwing. In ab. immaculata Fuchs (72 e) these white dots are absent, while they form a complete row in ab. punctata Tutt. which is even continued on to the forewing. Numerous modifications in the degree of completeness or obsolescence of the row have received names (caecus, incompleta, bipuncata, etc.), such individual aberrations occurring all among specimens of the nymotypical race. — borealis Krul,[now C. r. borealis Krulikovsky, 1890] from Kasan, is somewhat smaller, being more yellowish green and without the white dots of the nymotypical form. — polaris Moschl [C. r. borealis Krulikovsky, 1890], from the most northern districts of the area of distribution, is a small form, with the underside duller green. — sibirica Ruhl [C. r. sibirica (Rühl, 1895)] differs in almost the same way, the underside being less bright green than in rubi rubi; Northern Asia. — fervida Stgr.[C. r. fervida Staudinger, 1901] (72 f) is a southern form, the upperside being paler brown with a golden sheen (unfortunately not distinct in our figure). — suaveola Stgr.[now species Callophrys suaveola (Staudinger, 1881)(72 f), from Central Asia, is as large as the largest European specimens, the upperside darker, the underside deeper green. From Saisan and Lepsa; as true rubi also occurs in these localities, suaveola may turn out to be the summer-brood. — There occur, moreover, a number of individual varieties; for instance, specimens with the underside brown instead of green, females with a reddish yellow discal spot on the forewing above (Blachier), etc. Egg depressed, green, reticulate. Larva dark green, with a black-edged yellow dorsal line accompanied by pale spots, and with a yellowish side-line. It feeds in June and the autumn particularly on Papilionaceae, such as Sarothamnus, Genista, Cytisus, but also on many other plants, as oak, Vaccinium, Sedum, etc. It often bores deep into the flowers of Genista. Pupa short, much rounded; resembling a small bean, immovable, but nevertheless producing a feeble noise, which Kleemann calls creaking, Schilde twittering or chirping. The butterflies occur from April into July and in warmer districts of the plains again in July and August, the two broods being almost continuous, for instance at Darmstadt. They are very plentiful in most places and always rest with closed wings on shrubs and green twigs of Genista; they are not shy, the spring-specimens being particularly fond of the flowers of Potentilla.

== Life cycle and behavior ==
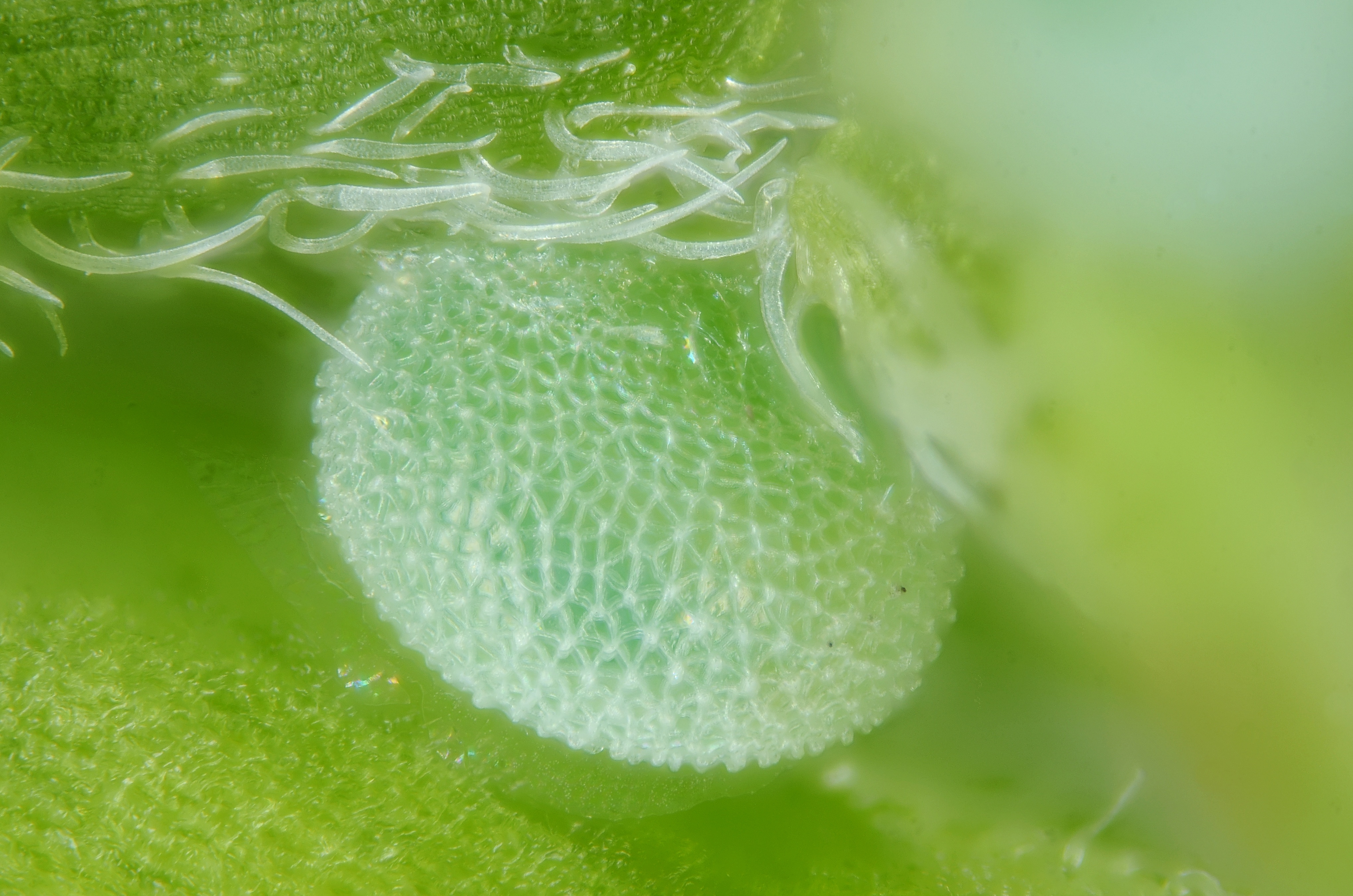
Egg

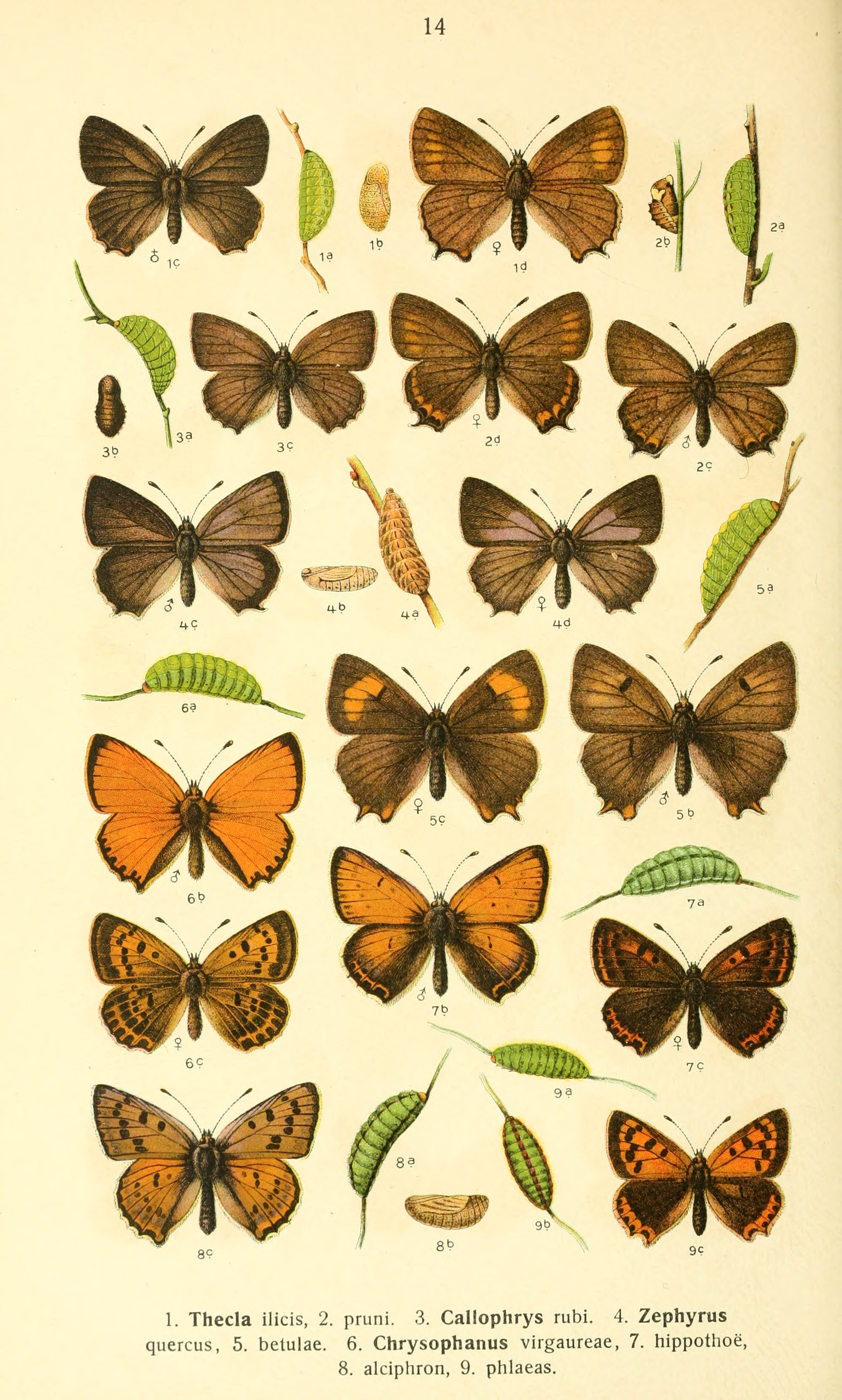
Figure 3 from Karl Eckstein's Die Schmetterlinge Deutschlands depicts the larva, pupa and imago

These butterflies can be found at the end of March, with flight time usually lasting until the end of June, but they are sometimes seen in July and early August. They never rest with their wings open, to maintain their green camouflage. The males exhibit territorial behavior.

The eggs are laid singly. The caterpillars are not known to be tended by ants, unlike some lycid larvae, but the pupae, which are formed at ground level, emit squeaks that attract ants and it is thought that ants will always bury any that are found. Green hairstreaks overwinter as pupae and are univoltine, having one generation of adult butterflies per year.

The larva is recorded as feeding on Vaccinium myrtillus, Vaccinum uliginosum, Betula, Rubus idaeus, Vicia cracca, Trifolium medium, Calluna vulgaris, Frangula, Rhamnus, Ribes, Spiraea, Caragana, Chamaecytisus, Hedysarum, Genista, Trifolium and Hippophae rhamnoides in different parts of its range.

This polyphagous species probably has one of the largest range of food plants of any British butterfly. Early butterfly collectors thought that the only food plant was bramble (blackberry) Rubus fruticosus but as its habits became better understood the list grew and will probably continue to do so. Depending on the habitat it will use common rock rose Helianthemum nummularium, bird's-foot trefoil Lotus corniculatus, gorse Ulex europaeus, broom Cytisus scoparius, Dyer's greenweed Genista tinctoria, bilberry Vaccinium myrtillus, dogwood Cornus sanguinea, buckthorn Rhamnus cathartica, cross-leaved heath Erica tetralix and bramble.

== Habitat ==
The wide range of food plants means that this butterfly is able to use a wide range of habitats including chalk downland, heathland, moorland and clearings in woodland. It is present in wetlands as well as on poor dry meadows, at an elevation of about 0–2,300 metres (0–7,546 ft).

== Distribution ==
Callophrys rubi is found in most of Europe, North Africa, Russia, Asia Minor, Siberia, Amurland, Baluchistan and Chitral. It is still widespread across most of the UK, although many colonies have been lost in recent years. In Mediterranean countries it is quite localised and it is usually found near the coasts.

== See also ==
- List of butterflies of Great Britain
