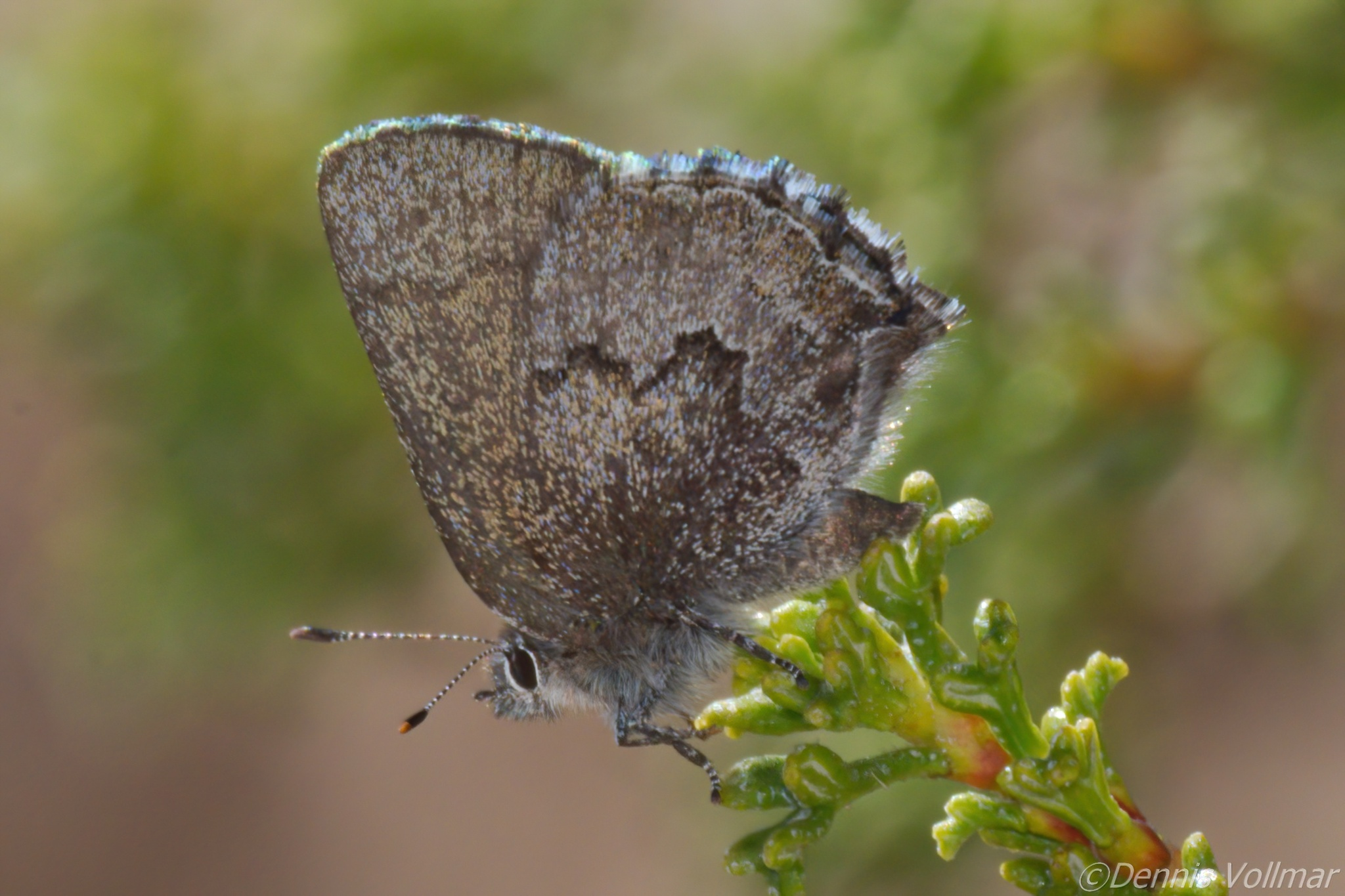

Scientific classification
- Domain: Eukaryota
- Kingdom: Animalia
- Phylum: Arthropoda
- Class: Insecta
- Order: Lepidoptera
- Family: Lycaenidae
- Genus: Callophrys
- Species: C. fotis

Binomial name
- Callophrys fotis (Strecker, 1878)

Subspecies
- See text

Synonyms
- Incisalia fotis; Thecla fotis Strecker, 1878; Deciduphagus fotis

= Callophrys fotis =

Species of butterfly

Callophrys fotis is a species of butterfly in the family Lycaenidae, the gossamer-winged butterflies. It is known by several common names, including early elfin, desert elfin, Fotis hairstreak, Strecker's elfin, and Arizona gray elfin. It is native to the southwestern United States, where it occurs in southeastern California, Nevada, Utah, western Colorado, northern Arizona, and northwestern New Mexico.

This butterfly has a wingspan of 19 to 28 millimeters.

== Subspecies ==
Subspecies include:

- Callophrys fotis fotis
- Callophrys fotis mojavensis (Austin, 1998)
