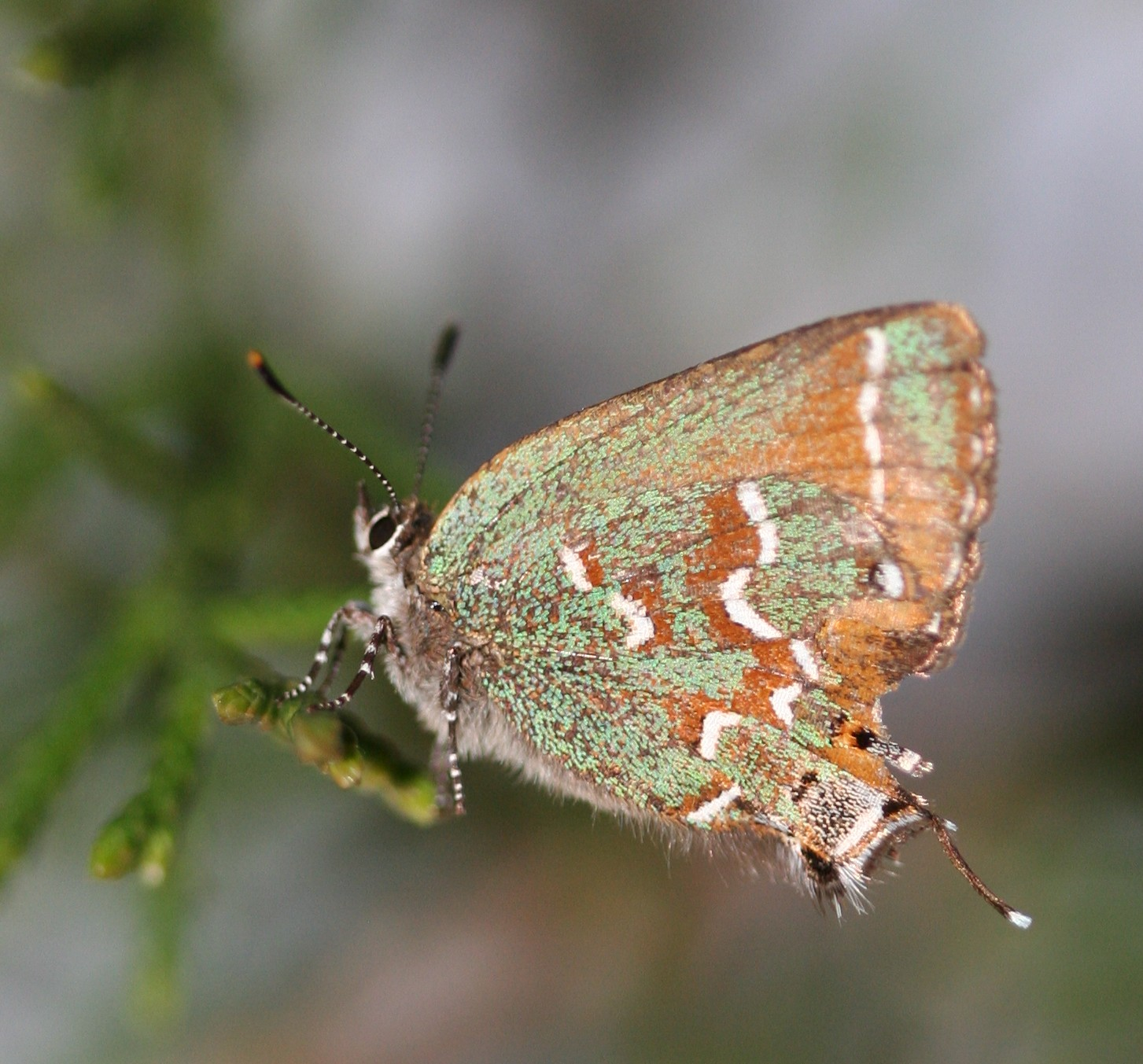
- "Olive" juniper hairstreak (C. g. gryneus)
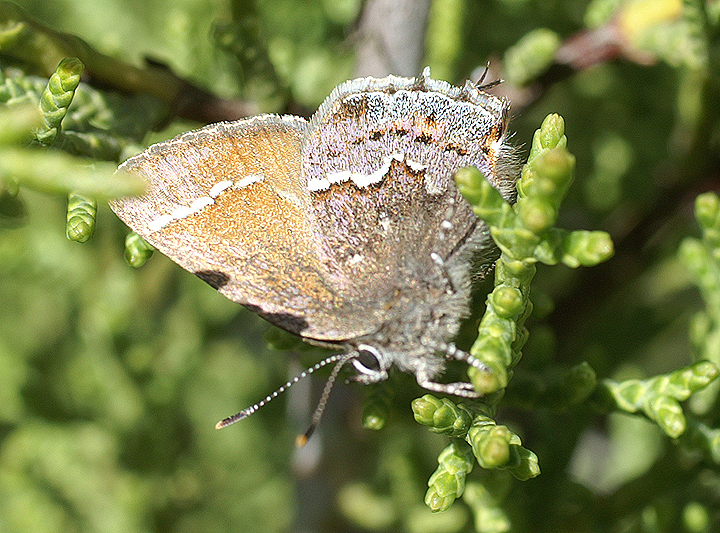
- "Thorne's" juniper hairstreak (C. g. thornei)

Scientific classification
- Domain: Eukaryota
- Kingdom: Animalia
- Phylum: Arthropoda
- Class: Insecta
- Order: Lepidoptera
- Family: Lycaenidae
- Genus: Callophrys
- Species: C. gryneus

Binomial name
- Callophrys gryneus (Hübner, [1819])

Synonyms
- List: Lycus gryneus Hübner, 1819; Mitoura gryneus; Papilio damon Stoll, [1782] (preocc.); Polyommatus damastus Godart, [1824]; Thecla auburniana Harris, 1862; Thecla damon var. patersonia Brehme, 1907; Thecla damon var. octoscripta Bucholz, 1951; Callophrys (Mitoura) turkingtoni Johnson, 1976; Callophrys (Mitoura) byrnei Johnson, 1976; Callophrys (Mitoura) siva chalcosiva Clench, 1981; Mitoura siva clenchi Johnson, 1988; Mitoura cedrosensis Brown & Faulkner, 1989; Thecla smilacis Boisduval & Leconte, [1833]; Mitoura sweadneri Chermock, 1945; Thecla castalis Edwards, 1871; Thecla damon var. discoidalis Skinner, 1897; Mitoura gryneus castalis f. brehmei Barnes & Benjamin, 1923; Callophrys (Mitoura) barryi Johnson, 1976; Callophrys (Mitoura) barryi acuminata Johnson, 1976; Thecla loki Skinner, 1907; Thecla siva Edwards, 1874; Mitoura siva; Thecla rhodope Godman & Salvin, [1887]; Mitoura siva f. juniperaria Comstock, 1925; Mitoura siva mansfieldi Tilden, 1951

= Callophrys gryneus =

Juniper hairstreak

Species of butterfly

Callophrys gryneus, the juniper hairstreak or olive hairstreak, is a butterfly native to North America. It belongs in the family Lycaenidae.

== Description ==
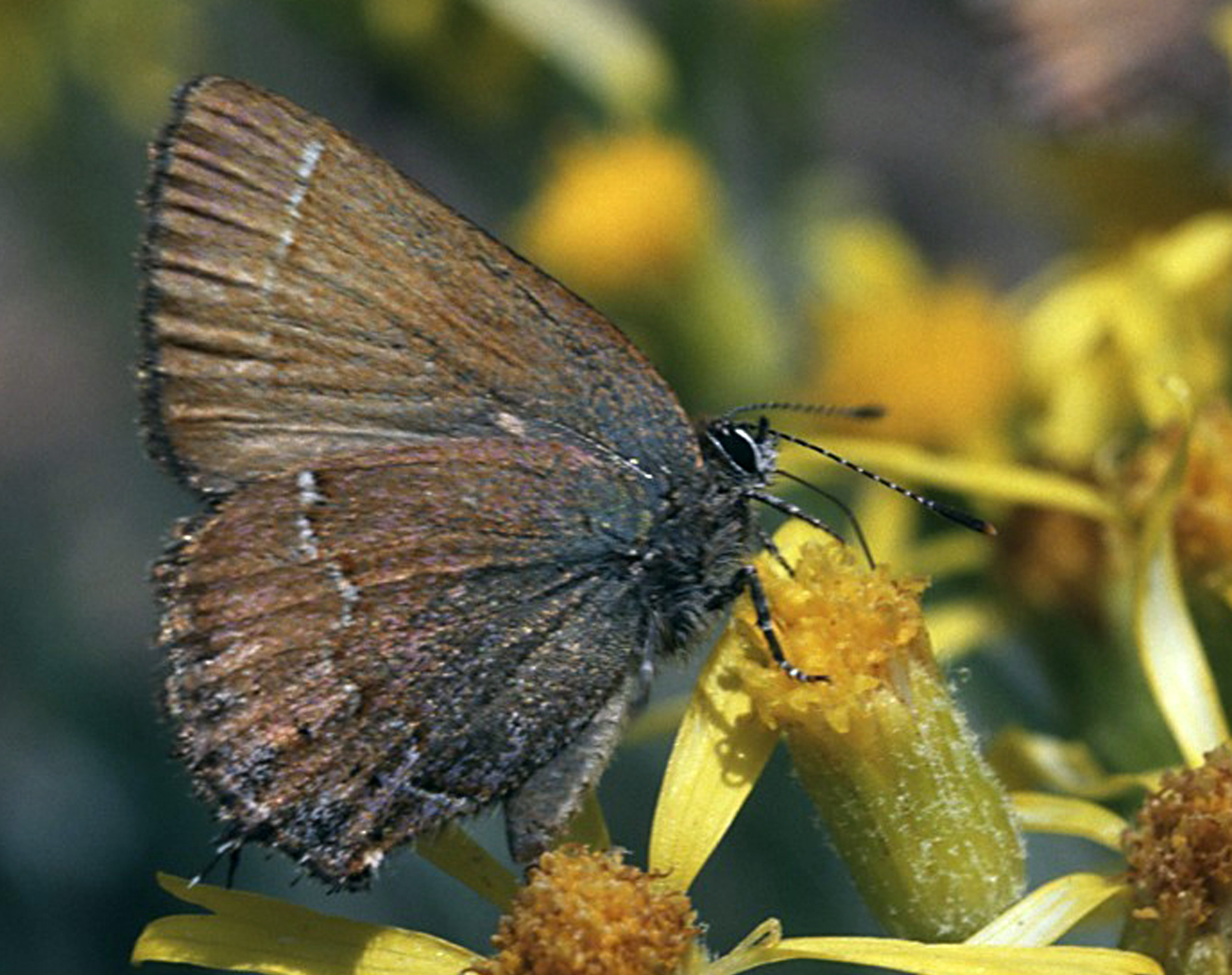
C. g. nelsoni

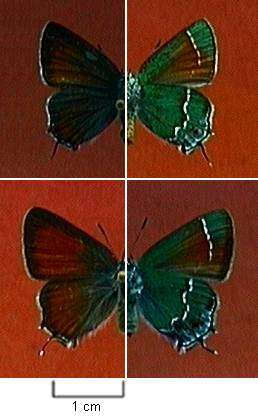
C. g. siva

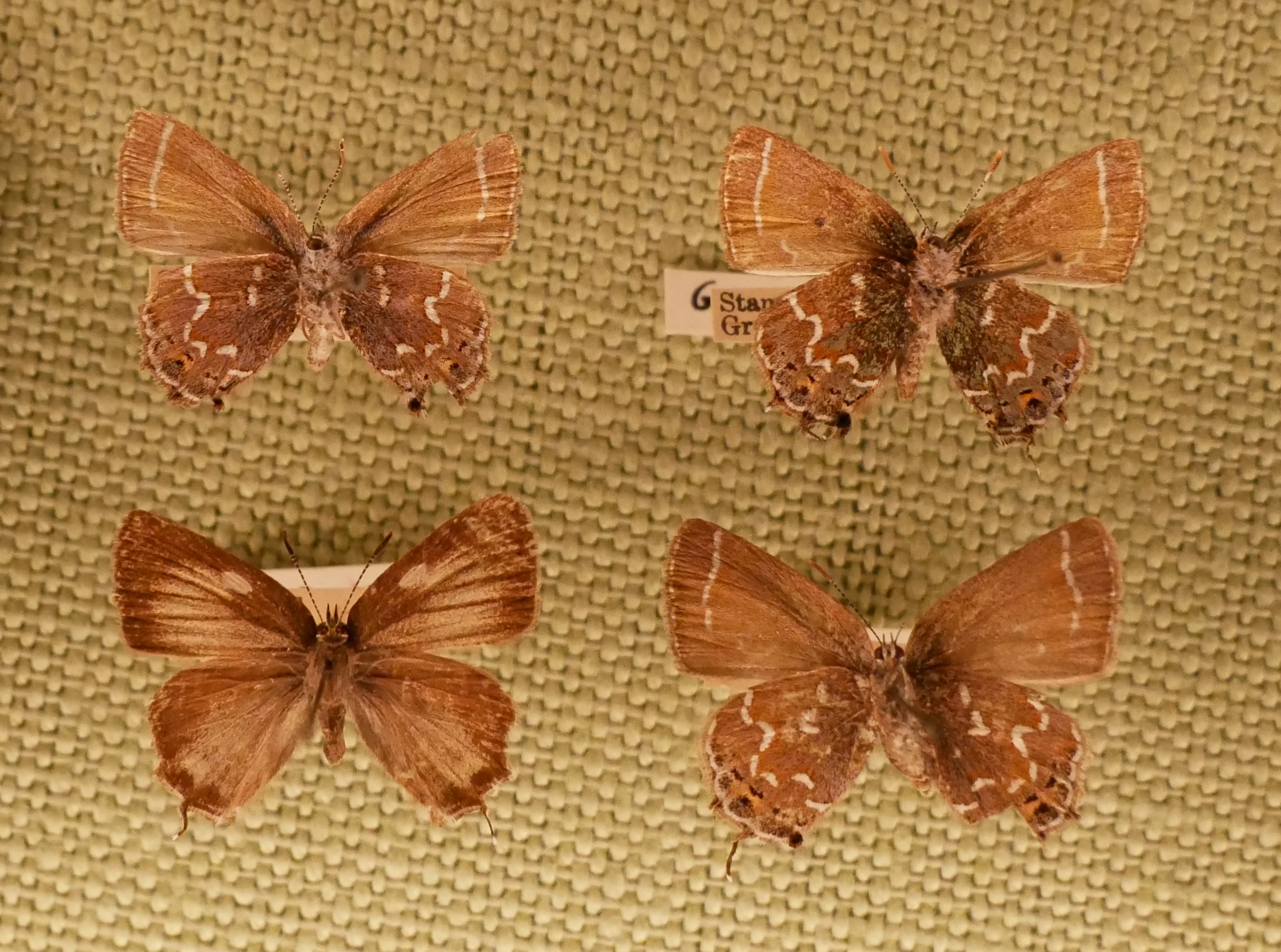
Museum Specimens

The juniper hairstreak has many subspecies or races, some of which may even be separate species. The upper side of the "olive" juniper hairstreak (C. g. gryneus) is tawny orange or a bronzy color in males, and blackish brown in females. The underside of the wings is bright green with a variable amount of brown scaling. There are two white postbasal spots and a white zigzag postmedian line edged inward with brown on the hindwing.

"Sweadner's" juniper hairstreak (C. g. sweadneri) is very similar to the gryneus race except the two white postbasal spots are reduced.

The "Siva" juniper hairstreak (C. g. siva) is also similar to the gryneus race. It lacks the postbasal spots, the postmedian line is straight, and some individuals are brown. Intermediates of the gryneus and siva races occur in west Texas and New Mexico.

The underside of "Nelson's" juniper hairstreak (C. g. nelsoni) is brown with a violet sheen; the white postmedian line is faint, sometimes partial or absent; and the postbasal spots are lacking.

"Muir's" juniper hairstreak (C. g. muiri) is similar to the nelsoni race except the underside of the wings are a darker brown with a purplish-greenish tint, and the postmedian line is partial to complete.

The underside of the "Loki" juniper hairstreak (C. g. loki) is green to purplish brown. Inward of the white postmedian line, the hindwing often has a dark band.

"Thorne's juniper hairstreak (C. g. thornei) is quite similar to the loki race except it usually lacks green more often being a violet brown to a brownish gray color.

== Similar species ==
The Hessel's hairstreak (Callophrys hesseli) is the only similar species in the juniper hairstreak's range. The Hessel's hairstreak is similar to the gryneus and sweadneri races. It is often more of a blue-green color, the postmedian line is edged with brown on both sides, and it has a white spot near the fore wing costa.

Another related butterfly species found in North America is Callophrys xami, which is commonly referred to as the xami hairstreak or green hairstreak. Aesthetically, C. gryneus differs significantly from C. xami in regards to the postmedian white line running across the butterfly wings as the juniper species lacks the sharp W mark, a distinctive feature of C. xami butterfly wings, in the postmedian white band.

== Habitat ==
Habitats include bluffs, open fields, barrens, and dry or rocky open places. They are almost always found near or on junipers in these habitats.

== Nectar plants ==
Both sexes visit flowers near the host plant, especially the sweadneri race.

== Life cycle ==
Males are highly territorial on cedar trees, where they perch in search of females. Often, males can be set in flight by gently shaking the trees. Females lay their eggs singly at the tip of host plant leaves. The eggs are pale green with white ridges. The larvae are vivid green with a faint middorsal stripe that begins at the thorax and runs down the abdomen. Whitish-yellow spots occur on either side of the middorsal stripe. A whitish-yellow subspiracular stripe (sometimes broken between segments) runs the length of the body. The chrysalis of the gryneus race is brown to pale brown and is mottled with black with the abdomen being a bit reddish. Chrysalids of western races are dark brown. The juniper hairstreak overwinters as a chrysalis. The gryneus race has two broods per year; sweadneri, two broods per year; siva, two or three broods per year; nelsoni, one brood; muiri, one brood; loki, one or two broods; and the thornei race has one brood per year.

== Host plants ==
Host plants of the juniper hairstreak:

- Eastern redcedar, Juniperus virginiana (used by the gryneus and sweadneri races)
- California incense-cedar, Calocedrus decurrens (used by the nelsoni race)
- Western red-cedar, Thuja plicata (used by the nelsoni race)
- Sargeant's cypress, Cupressus sargentii (used by the muiri race)
- Tecate cypress, Cupressus forbesii (used by the thornei race)
- Common juniper, Juniperus communis (used by the siva race)
- Alligator juniper, Juniperus deppeana (used by the siva race)
- Utah juniper, Juniperus osteosperma (used by the siva race)
- Rocky Mountain juniper, Juniperus scopulorum (used by the siva race)
- Ashe juniper, Juniperus ashei (used by the gryneus race)
- California juniper, Juniperus californica (used by the siva and loki races)
