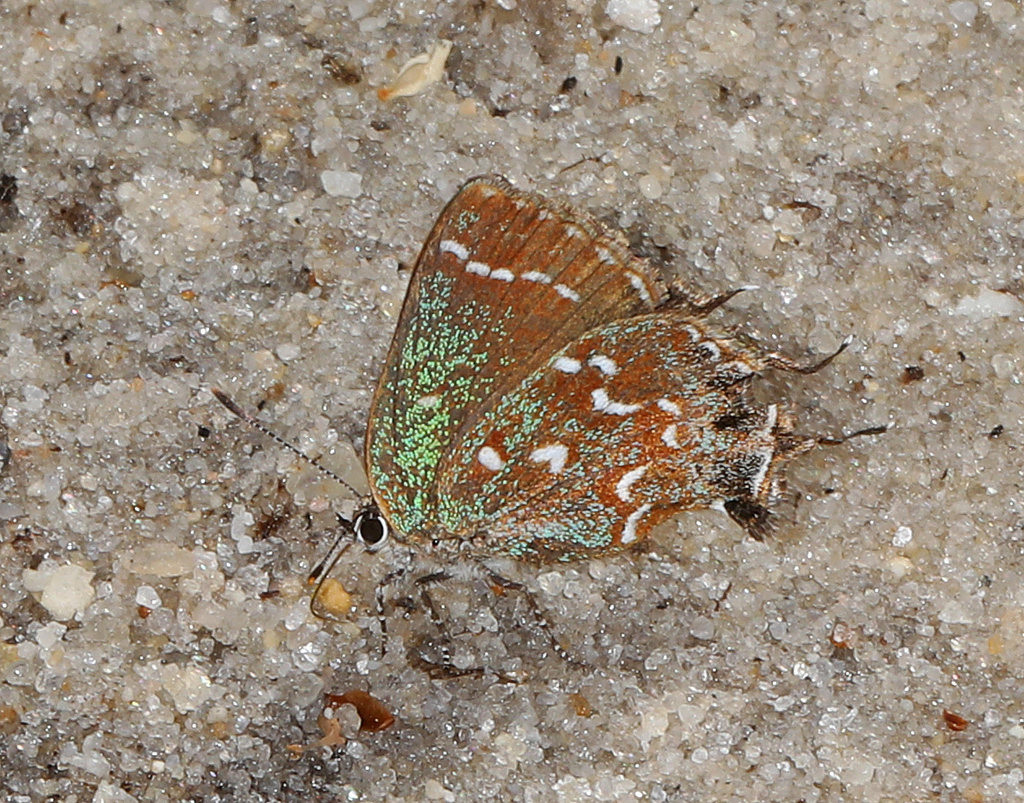

Conservation status
- Vulnerable (NatureServe)

Scientific classification
- Kingdom: Animalia
- Phylum: Arthropoda
- Clade: Pancrustacea
- Class: Insecta
- Order: Lepidoptera
- Family: Lycaenidae
- Genus: Callophrys
- Species: C. hesseli

Binomial name
- Callophrys hesseli (Rawson & Ziegler, 1950)

Synonyms
- Mitoura hesseli Rawson & Ziegler, 1950; Mitoura hesseli angulata Gatrelle, 2001

= Callophrys hesseli =

Hessel's hairstreak

Species of butterfly

Callophrys hesseli, or Hessel's hairstreak, is a butterfly of the family Lycaenidae. It ranges from southern Maine south along the Atlantic coastal plain to the Florida Panhandle on the Gulf Coast. The species was first described (as Mitoura hesseli) by George W. Rawson and J. Benjamin Ziegler in 1950, in honor of the lepidopterist Sidney Adolphus Hessel. It is listed as endangered in Connecticut by state authorities due factors such as logging and insecticide.

These butterflies live in wetlands, as that is where the Atlantic white-cedar (Chamaecyparis thyoides) thrives. The whole lifecycle of these butterflies depends on this tree. The caterpillars feed off the foliage of the tree, then the adult butterflies will mate and lay their eggs on the tree. Adults consume nectar from flowers including swamp milkweed, shadbush, sand myrtle, sweet pepperbush, highbush blueberry, buttonbush, and dogbane.

The Hessel's hairstreak wings have their unique identifier of olive green and rusty brown colors. It has adapted to camouflage with the Atlantic white-cedar in both its caterpillar and butterfly form.

== Taxonomy ==
Full Scientific Classification
Kingdom	Animalia – Animal, animaux, animals
Subkingdom	Bilateria – triploblasts
Infrakingdom	Protostomia
Superphylum	Ecdysozoa
Phylum	Arthropoda – Artrópode, arthropodes, arthropods
Subphylum	Hexapoda – hexapods
Class	Insecta – insects, hexapoda, inseto, insectes
Subclass	Pterygota – insects ailés, winged insects
Infraclass	Neoptera – modern, wing-folding insects
Superorder	Holometabola
Order	Lepidoptera – butterflies, moths, papillons, papillons de nuit, Borboleta, Mariposa
Superfamily	Papilionoidea Latreille, 1802 – butterflies, papillons
Family	Lycaenidae [Leach], 1815 – blues, coppers, gossamer-winged butterflies, hairstreaks, harvesters, Gossamer-wing Butterflies
Subfamily	Theclinae Swainson, 1831 – Hairstreaks
Tribe	Eumaeini E. Doubleday, 1847
Subtribe	Eumaeina E. Doubleday, 1847
Genus	Callophrys Billberg, 1820
Subgenus	Callophrys (Mitoura) Scudder, 1872
Species	Callophrys hesseli (Rawson and Ziegler, 1950) – Hessel's Hairstreak
Subspecies	Callophrys hesseli hesseli (Rawson and Ziegler, 1950)

Table from ITIS ITIS - Report: Callophrys hesseli hesseli

== Description ==
The Adult Hessel's hairstreaks wings have a base of a rusty brown color with many Olive green dots throughout. There are also white bands towards the ends of the wing. They have a wingspan of about 1 inch. The caterpillars are fluorescent green, with thick white dashes down its sides.

=== Subspecies variation ===
Within the species Callophrys hesseli there are two proposed subspecies, Hesseli hesseli and Hesseli angulata. If these two subspecies were to be accepted, the populations of Callophrys hesseli in Florida, Georgia, and South Carolina (specifically along the border of Georgia) would be classified as Callophrys Hesseli angulata. Populations elsewhere would be considered the subspecies Hesseli hesseli. The primary difference between the subspecies Hesseli hesseli and Hesseli angulata lies in their wings and tails. Hesseli angulata wings are dark green to brown while in Hesseli hesseli their wings are typically olive green, and the patterns tend to be less defined and vary slightly from Hesseli angulata. Hesselia angulata also tend to be larger with longer tails.

== Habitat and Distribution ==
The habitat of the Hessel's Hairstreaks are terrestrial wetlands such as bogs, riparian, swamps, and forested wetlands. These biomes are home to their preferred plant, the Atlantic white-cedar tree.

The extensive habitat of the Hessel's Hairstreaks are confined to the east coast of the United States, from southern Maine to Florida. However, there are many small areas of exception which are unable to support populations for reasons that are not yet understood. The greatest density of population seems to be in the New Jersey area. There is an estimated total of 21-300 populations yet only 13-125 seem to have a strong stability.

== Behavior ==
Hessel's Hairstreaks are often seen when the tree they are perched on is disturbed and they disperse in response. Hessel's Hairstreaks tend to be in close proximity on the tree tops and the swarm of butterflies will swirl together whenever the disturbance occurs. However, in an uninterrupted state, the butterflies typically change their positions on the tree in relation to sunlight levels. Typically, the males are gathered at the top of the tree tops scouting for unmated females who will venture from the lower tree levels during mating seasons. During the middle of the day, both males and females will join at the top of the Atlantic white cedar trees to performing mating rituals where the males compete for the female's attention known as leks. Hessel's Hairstreaks will court, mate, and lay eggs all during this time period.

=== Lifespan ===
The lifespan of Hessel's Hairstreaks consist of three stages. During the beginning of May, eggs, inside of a chrysalis, will be spotted on branch tips of 4-6 weeks. They will then evolve into herbivore caterpillars or pupae diapause during the winter months. Nectarivore adults will live between 1-2 weeks.

== Adaptations ==
One of the Hessel's Hairstreak's greatest adaptations is their location and reliance on the Atlantic White Cedar trees. The soil located in the wetlands is acidic with very little oxygen, allowing for the adapted white cedar trees to dominate. The rare and specific wetland biome means that many species cannot solely survive there, therefore little competition exists for the harvesting caterpillars. The caterpillars evolved to blend in perfectly with the foliage of the trees which mainly consists of scaly green leaves with bright highlights. The coloration adaptations continue into adulthood in which the Hessel's Hairstreak, when at rest, reveals the underside of its wings which have a brown background with blue/green overlays. This helps to camouflage into the canopy of the Atlantic white cedars.

Hessel's Hairstreaks adapted specifically to ensure that the hatched eggs had food available immediately. By laying the eggs on the edge of the cedar branches, the caterpillars are able to eat their diet of new cedar growth without moving. The connections between the life cycle of the Atlantic white cedars also coincides with the pupae diapause, the delay in development of eggs, of the butterflies.As the colder seasons approach and there is no new growth of the cedars, the Hessel's Hairstreaks will be immobile during their pupae egg stage until weeks before the mating season in May. This evolution allows for the continuation of the Hessel Hairstreak species without undergoing starvation.

== Threats ==
The main threat to the Hessel's Hairstreaks are from habitat destruction due to natural disasters such as wildfires and hurricanes, destroying the trees. In addition, logging has destroyed many the cedar forests inhabited by the butterflies, while the increase in the deer population has hindered forest recovery. The wetlands they live in are also becoming increasingly rare. Competition between the Butterflies and Spongy Moths larvae decreases the Hessel's Hairstreak's population, spongy moth larvae often compete with other larvae such as the Hessel's Hairstreak larva, for resources, consequently decreasing the Hessel's Hairstreaks chances of survival. Due to these factors, the Hessel's Hairstreaks are listed as a G3 vulnerable species, primarily due to habitat loss. Though many suitable habitats remain, these habitats do not contain the butterflies, it is speculated the Hairstreaks have died out in these areas, due to previous logging and insecticide. Researchers believe there has been a 30-70% loss of population. In fact, surveys for the butterflies in New York in the 1990s found no Hessel's Hairstreaks in their known habitats, leading to the belief that no Hessel's Hairstreaks remain in the state of New York.

== Conservation ==
There are some protections enacted by Maine, Massachusetts, Rhode Island, Virginia and Florida and some New Jersey. Within New Jersey the state uses Hairstreak sighting to help determine and inform conservation efforts. Hessel's Hairstreaks in Massachusetts are protected under MESA. Conservationists, in Massachusetts insist on "land protection and habitat management" to preserve the Hessel's Hairstreak population. The state of Maine has laws protecting the wetland habitats, though none protect the butterflies from excessive logging. Some conservation efforts exist in Virginia, Florida and New Jersey.
