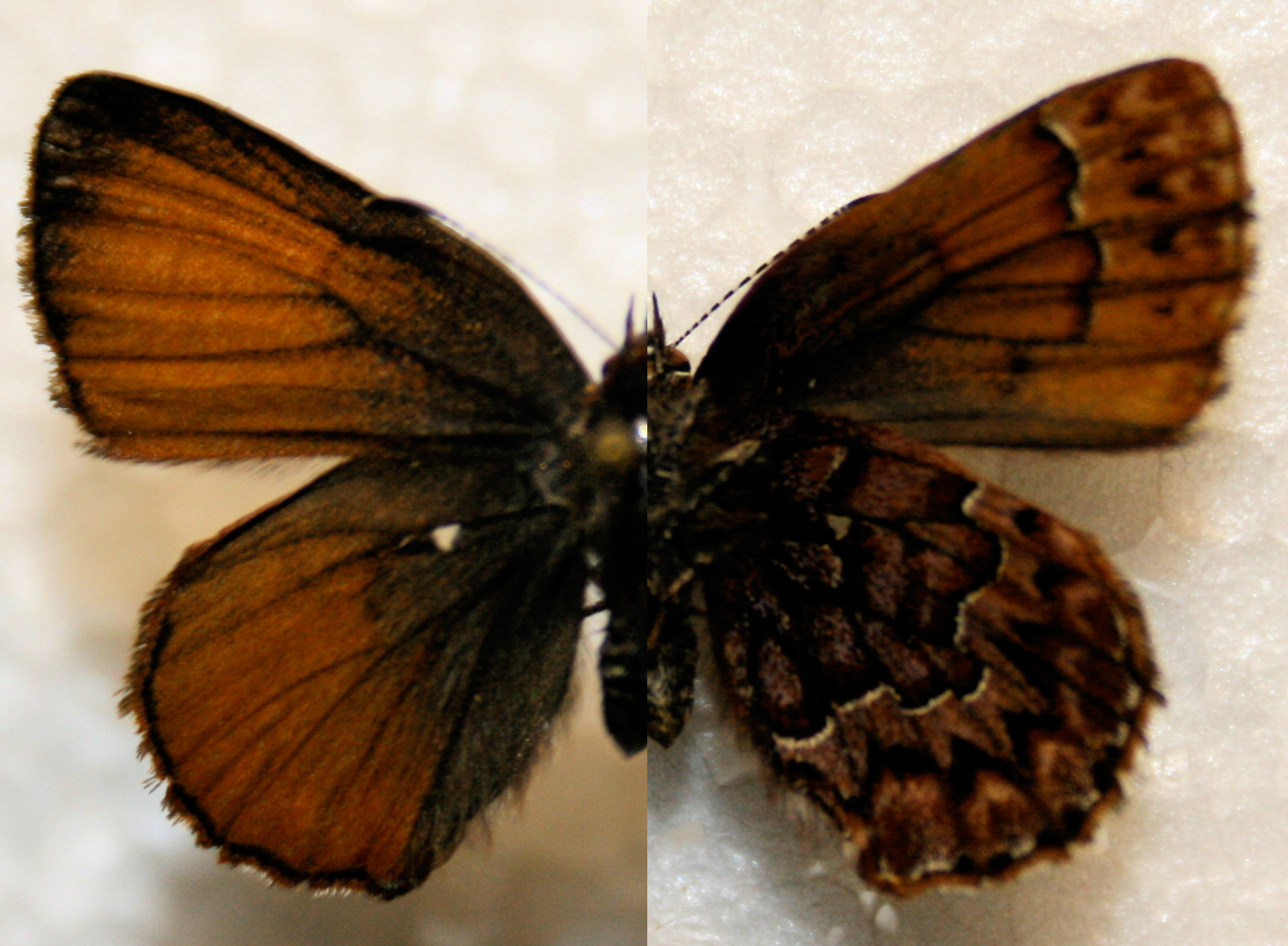

Scientific classification
- Kingdom: Animalia
- Phylum: Arthropoda
- Class: Insecta
- Order: Lepidoptera
- Family: Lycaenidae
- Genus: Callophrys
- Species: C. eryphon

Binomial name
- Callophrys eryphon (Boisduval,1852)

= Western pine elfin =

Species of butterfly

The western pine elfin (Callophrys eryphon) is a North American butterfly that ranges from British Columbia east to Maine and south to southern California, Arizona, and New Mexico. Males are brown and females are orange-brown, with both having bold patterned hind wings. The top of the wings have dark bars with a lighter chevron shaped margin. The body is 19–32 mm in length and has no tail.

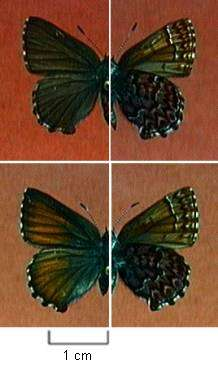

This butterfly is found in natural pine woods and evergreen forests. In the northwest United States they are found nesting in lodgepole pines and can be seen perched on shrubs and smaller trees while searching for food or looking for a mate. The western pine elfin is seldom seen outside its natural habitat. They feed on flower nectar including wild blueberries, milkweed, and clover.

== Reproduction ==
The adults emerge from the caterpillar hibernation stage and have one flight cycle in early spring from March to June and the female lays eggs on the base of new pine needles. The adult pair produce only one brood. The mature larvae are 15 mm long. The head of the caterpillar is green and the fine hair covered body is velvet green with cream to yellow stripes. It is a defoliating insect that feeds on the young pine needles until it enters hibernation in late July or August.

== Status ==
The western pine elfin has few predators and its conservation status is globally secure with no real threats.
