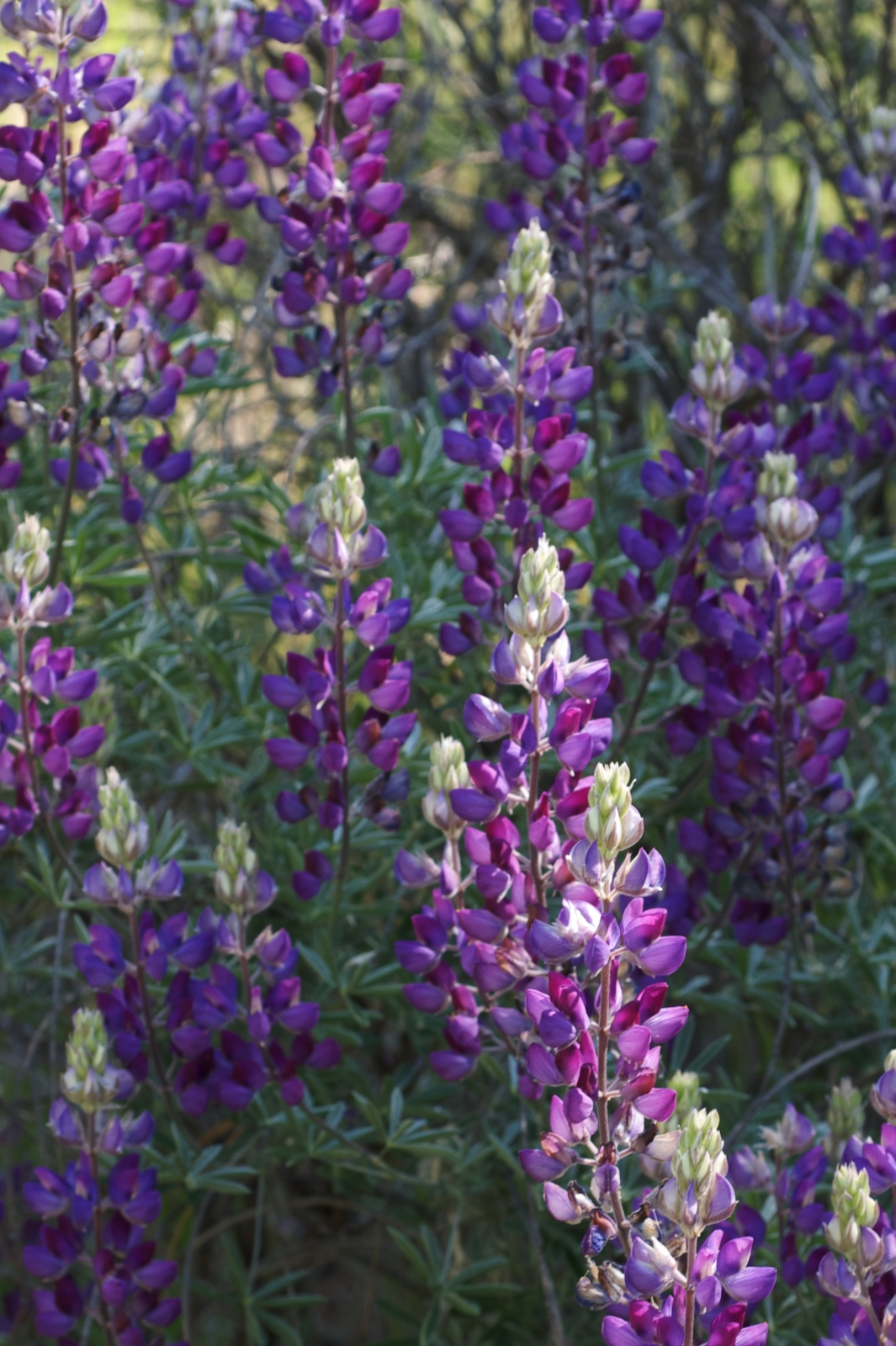

Conservation status
- Secure (NatureServe)

Scientific classification
- Kingdom: Plantae
- Clade: Tracheophytes
- Clade: Angiosperms
- Clade: Eudicots
- Clade: Rosids
- Order: Fabales
- Family: Fabaceae
- Subfamily: Faboideae
- Genus: Lupinus
- Species: L. albifrons

Binomial name
- Lupinus albifrons Benth.

= Lupinus albifrons =

Species of legume

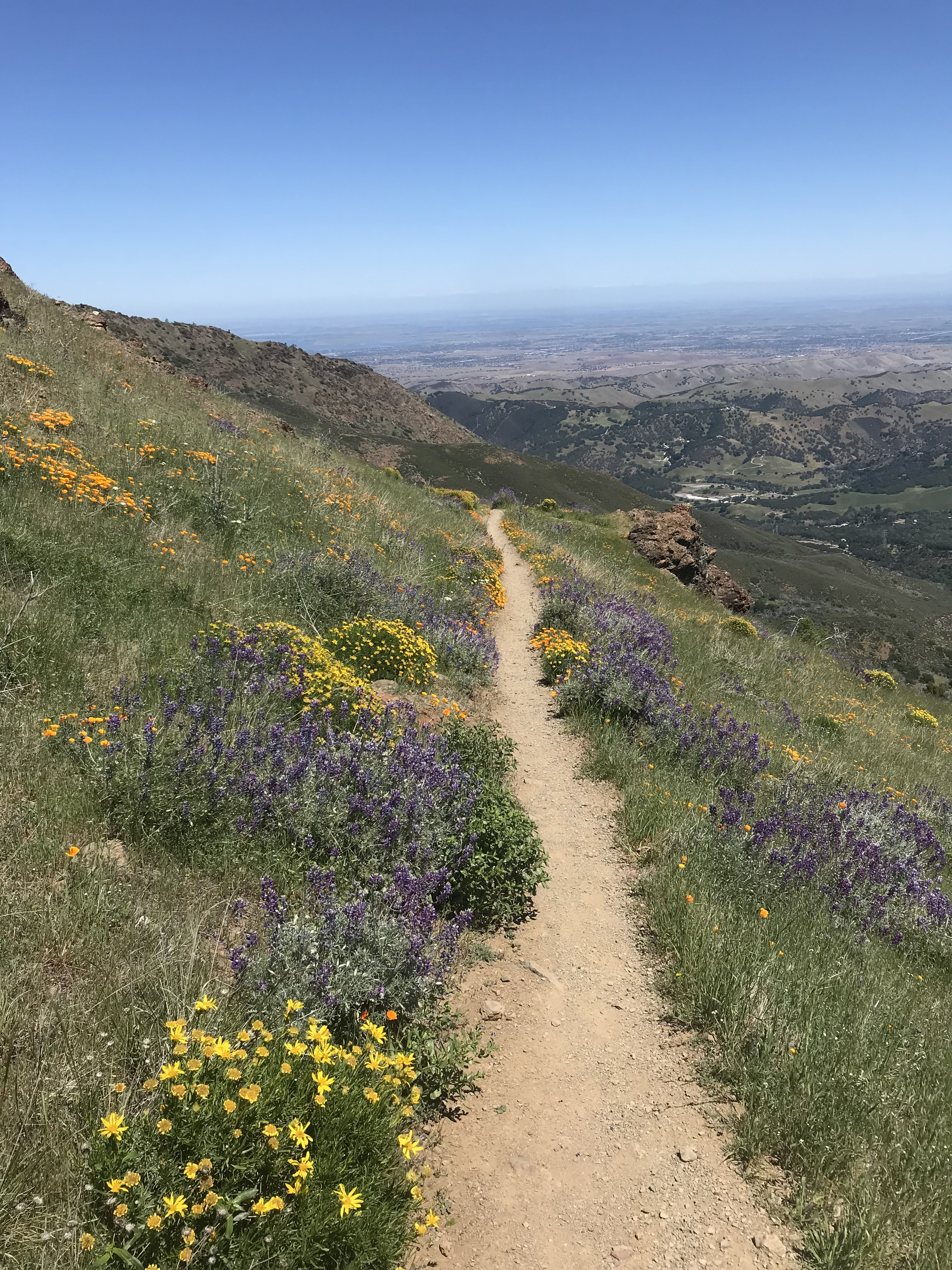
L. albifrons blooming next to Eschscholzia californica and Ericameria linearifolia on North Peak Trail in Mt. Diablo State Park

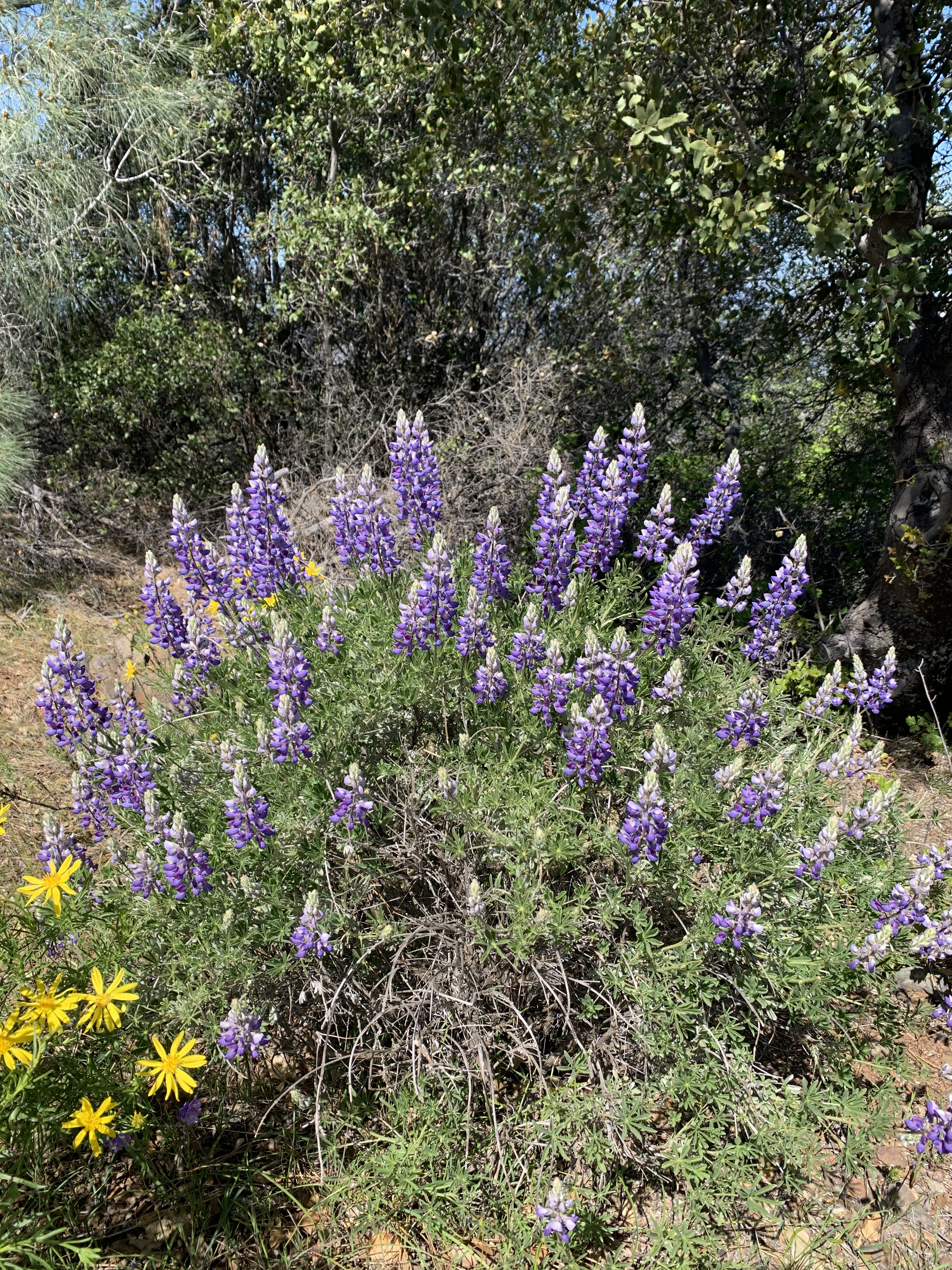
L. albifrons blooming alongside Ericameria linearifolia on the northern portion of Mt. Diablo State Park

Lupinus albifrons, silver lupine, white-leaf bush lupine, or evergreen lupine, is a species of lupine (lupin). It is native to California and Oregon, where it grows along the coast and in dry and open meadows, prairies and forest clearings. It is a member of several plant communities, including coastal sage scrub, chaparral, northern coastal scrub, foothill woodland, and yellow pine forest. Silver lupine is an important species for several animals throughout these ranges and shows high genetic and morphological diversity within these ranges.

== Description ==
Lupinus albifrons is a perennial shrub, quickly growing anywhere from 2 ft (0.61 m) to 5 ft (1.5 m) tall and wide. It has a light blue to violet flower on 3–12 inches (7.6–30.5 cm) stalks. The leaves are silver with a feathery texture. It grows in sandy to rocky places below 5,000 feet (1,500 m).

== Cultivation ==
This plant grows as a wildflower in the hills and valleys of California. It requires good drainage and needs little water once the roots are established. When grown with tall fescue, a common grass used in California/Western Coast lawns, L. albifrons was shown to have decreased above-ground growth due to competition with the grass for soil space. Conversely, it was shown that the presence of the lupine could aid the growth of the tall fescue.

Fresh seed of L. albifrons var. flumineus is said to need no stratification in order to germinate, while stored seed germination is aided by physical scarification or a hot-water treatment typical of many other leguminous plants.

While a relatively easy to grow plant, L. albifrons can be relatively short lived for a perennial. Pruning in late winter can help rejuvenate old wood, and the plant may readily re-seed.

== Toxicity to livestock ==
The plant is deer-resistant due to the presence of the bitter-tasting alkaloid toxins anagyrine and lupinine. These toxins can negatively affect livestock, causing birth defects and weight loss, especially in young, inexperienced cattle. When cows are under stress from lactating, especially in times of low forage availability, they will consume more lupine than usual.

== Ecology ==
=== Mission blue butterfly ===
The federally endangered mission blue butterfly requires either Lupinus albifrons, Lupinus formosus or Lupinus variicolor, on which their larvae can feed. The butterfly becomes toxic itself when it feeds on the plant, leaving it with a bitter taste to deter predators.

Loss of habitat due to urbanization in the Bay Area has led to a decrease in L. albifrons populations, and as such populations of the Mission blue butterfly have been negatively impacted.

=== San Miguel Island Song Sparrow ===
Lupinus albifrons serves as an important nesting site for the San Miguel Island Song Sparrow (Melospiza melodia micronyx).

=== Pollination ===
Pollination of Lupinus albifrons is primarily done through various species in the genus Bombus. To deter pollinators from visiting flowers that have already been pollinated, the plant produces ethylene to change the spot on its banner petals from white/pale yellow to pink and then magenta as anthocyanins accumulate.

=== Protection against pathogens ===
The Painted Lady butterfly (Vanessa cardui) was shown to have a higher survival rate to the virus Junonia coenia densovirus when using L. albifrons as a host compared to Plantago lanceolata. This could be because of the plant's unique chemistry and high levels of secondary metabolites.

== Infraspecific taxa ==
Lupinus albifrons has six different varieties, four of which are endemic to California, the other two occur in both California and Oregon: The speciation of these varieties is still under investigation, as well as L. albifrons relationship to similar, closely related taxa of other western perennial lupines.

- Lupinus albifrons var. albifrons, silver lupine
- Lupinus albifrons var. collinus, silver lupine
- Lupinus albifrons var. douglasii, Douglas' silver lupine
- Lupinus albifrons var. eminens, silver lupine
- Lupinus albifrons var. flumineus, silver lupine.
  - Found primarily in the chaparral of Mendocino, Trinity, and Siskiyou counties.
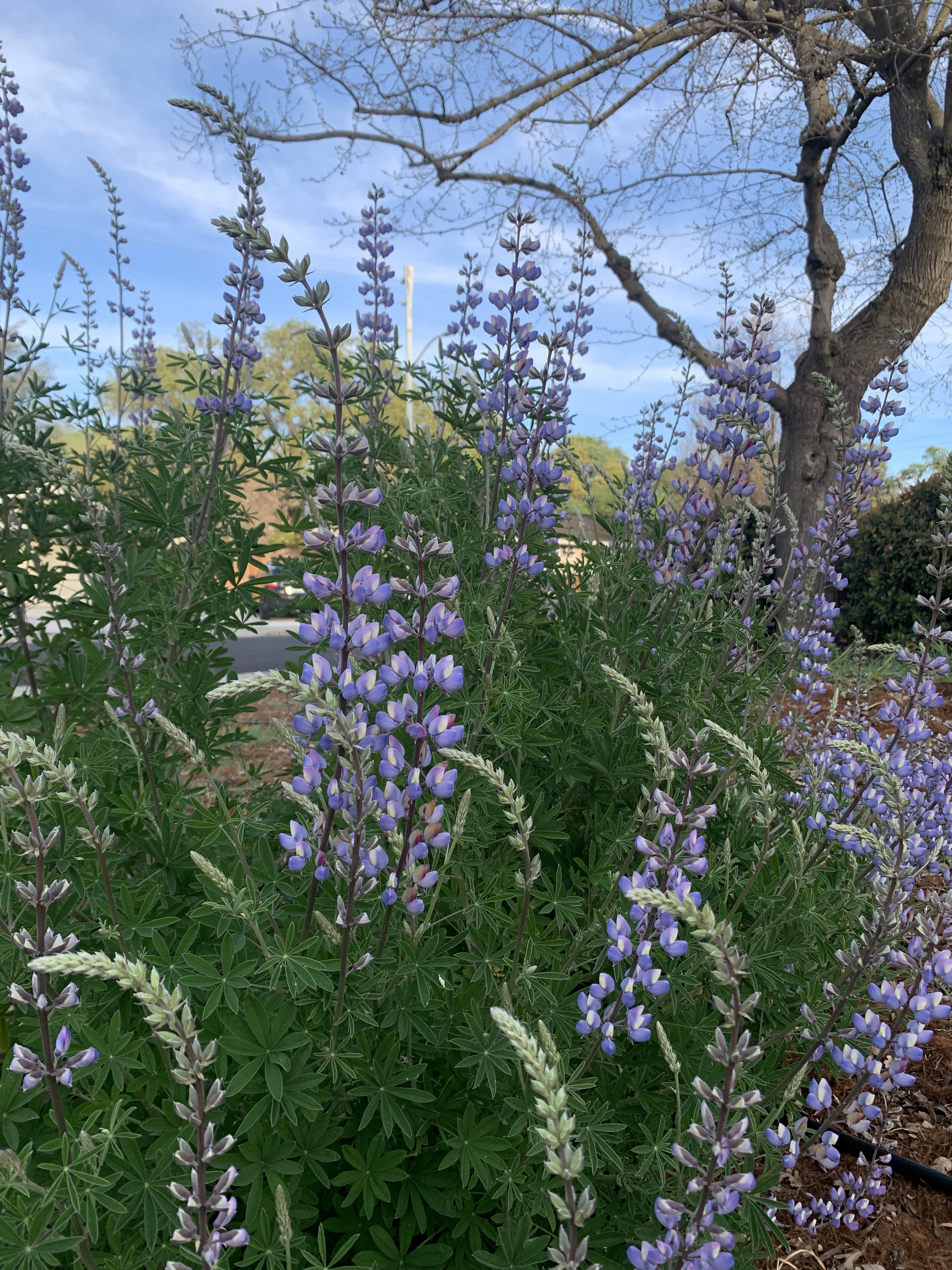
- Buds and blooms of L. albifrons
  Lupinus albifrons var. hallii, syn. Lupinus paynei, Payne's bush lupine.

== Photos ==
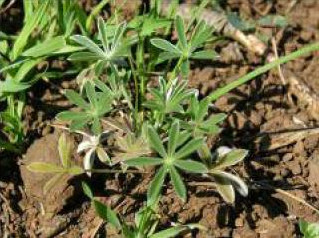
A lupine seedling at the site of a 2004 California wildfire

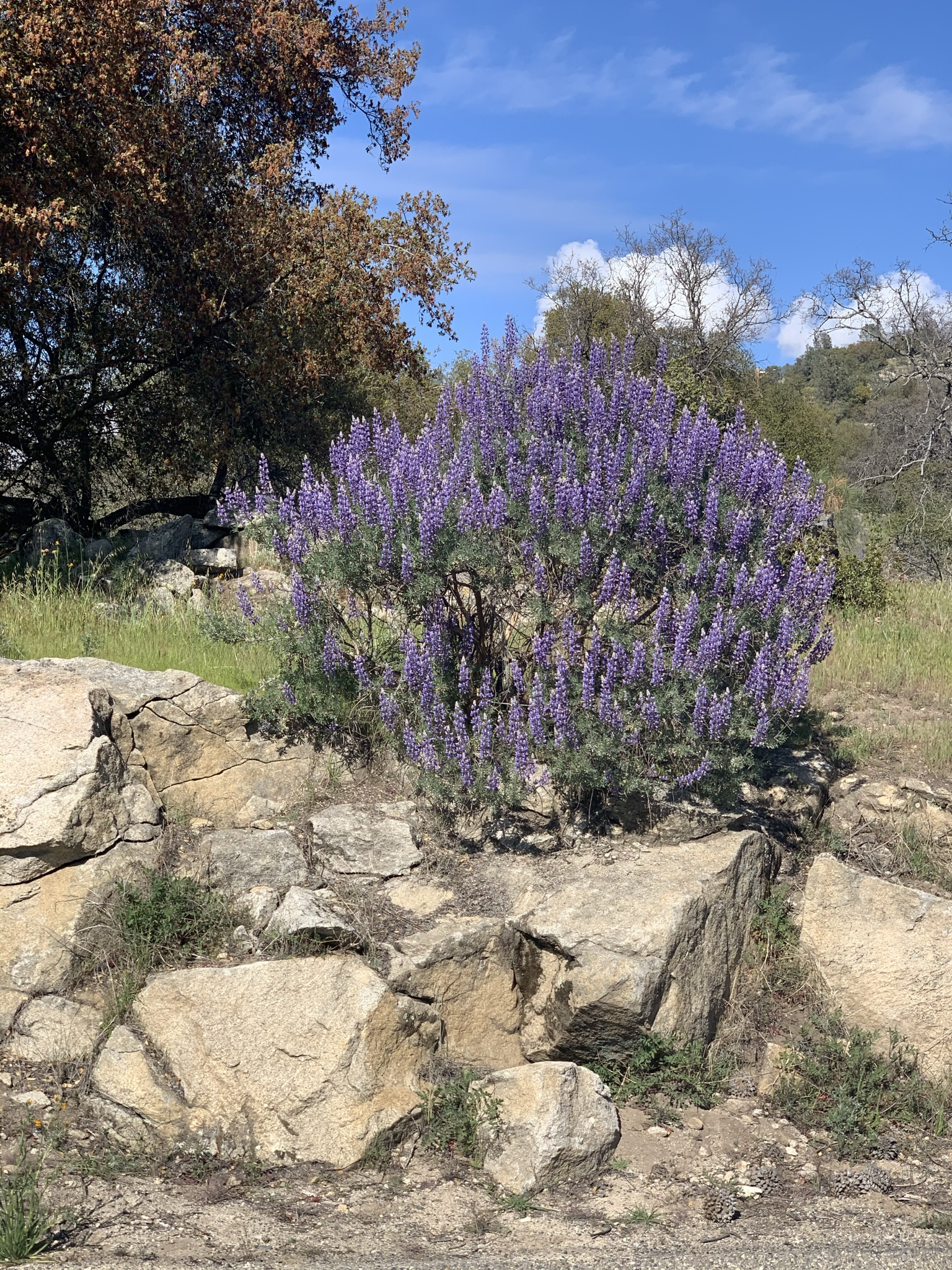
Blooming silver lupine

== See also ==
- California chaparral and woodlands
- California coastal sage and chaparral ecoregion
