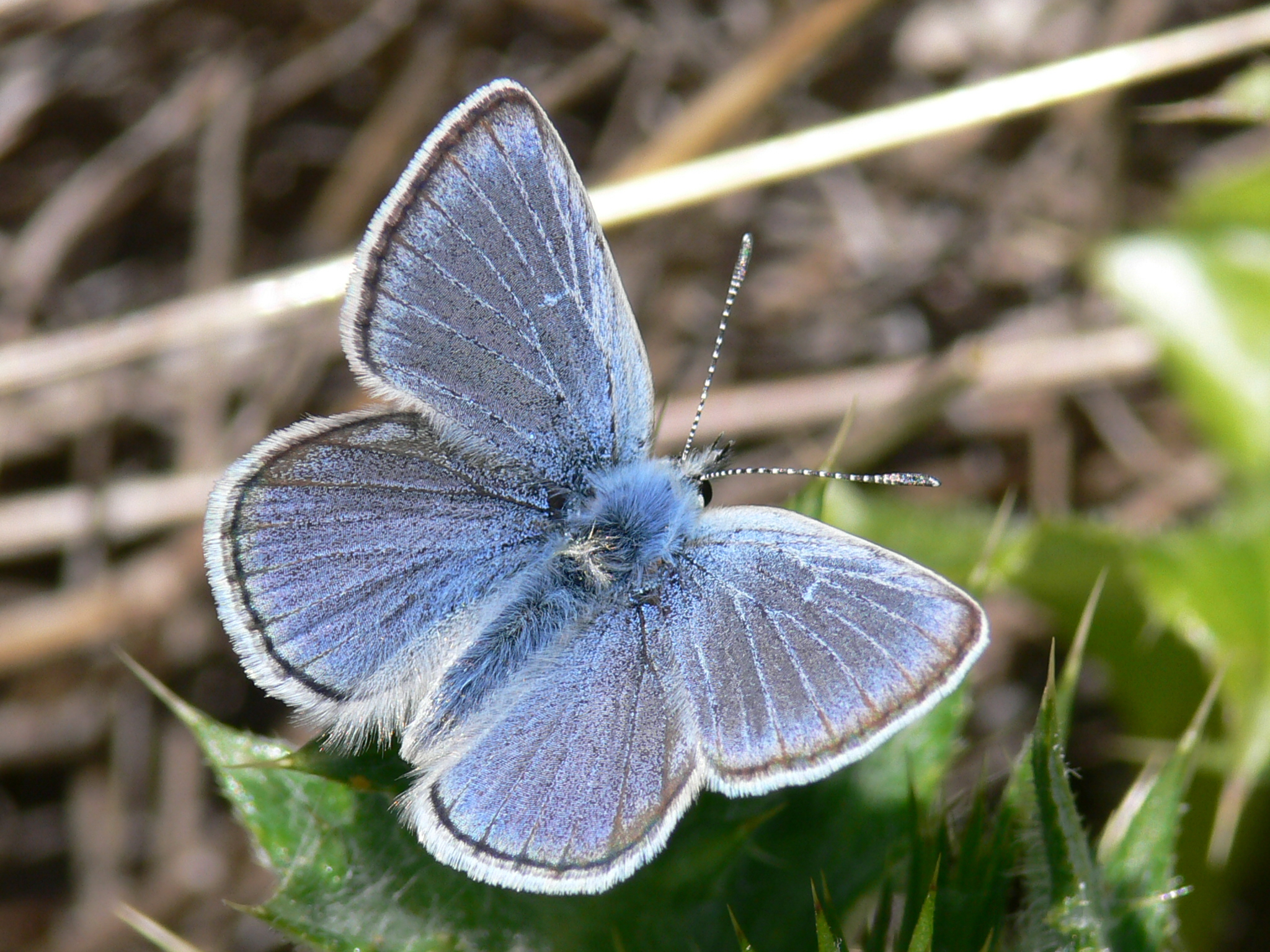
- Mission blue, male upperside.
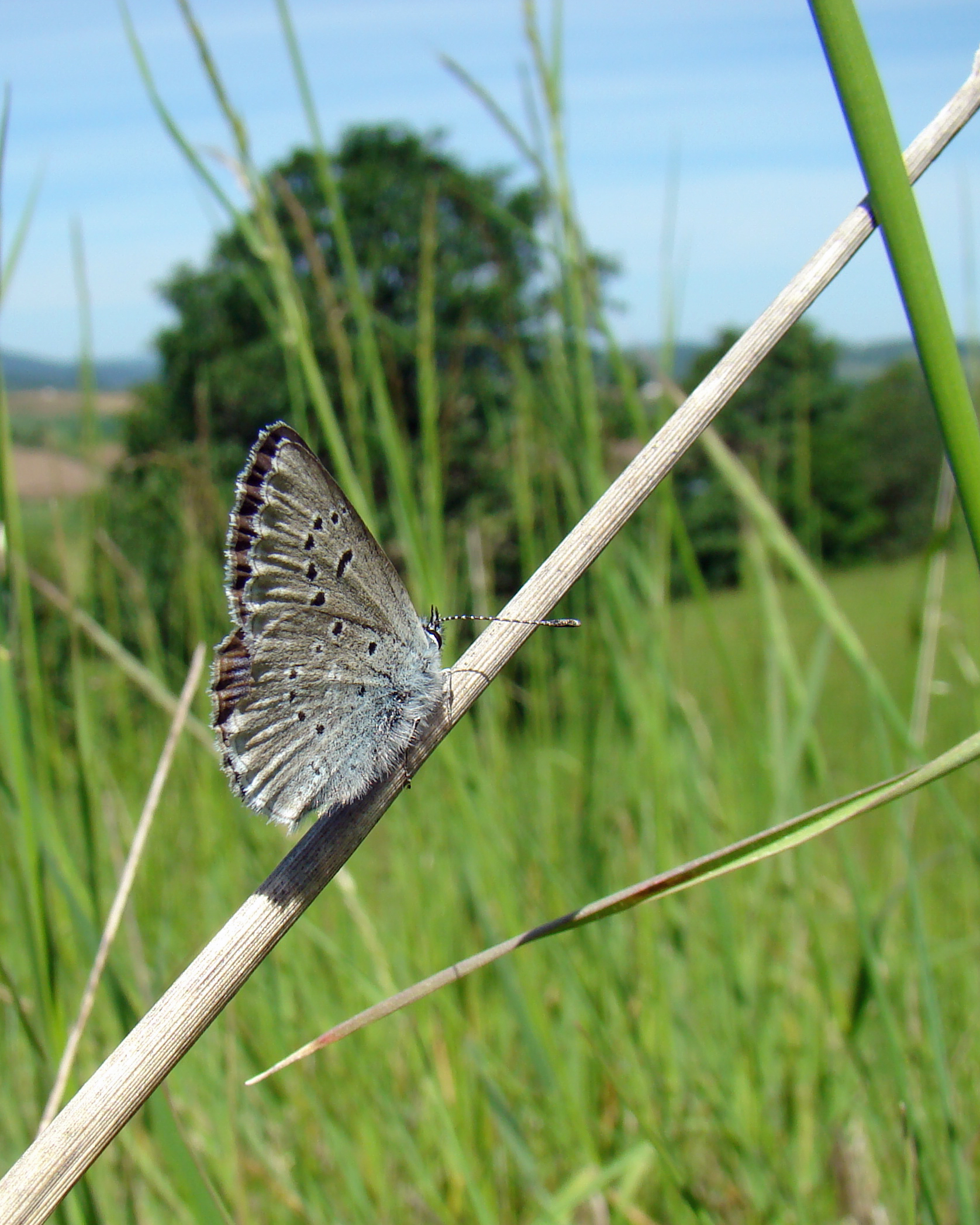
- Fender's blue, male underside.

Scientific classification
- Domain: Eukaryota
- Kingdom: Animalia
- Phylum: Arthropoda
- Class: Insecta
- Order: Lepidoptera
- Family: Lycaenidae
- Genus: Icaricia
- Species: I. icarioides

Binomial name
- Icaricia icarioides (Boisduval, 1852)

Subspecies
- See text

Synonyms
- Lycaena icarioides Boisduval, 1852; Cupido icarioides (Boisduval, 1852); Plebejus icarioides (Boisduval, 1852); Aricia icarioides (Boisduval, 1852)

= Icaricia icarioides =

Species of butterfly

Icaricia icarioides, or Boisduval's blue, is a butterfly of the family Lycaenidae found in North America. This butterfly has 25 recognized subspecies.

Their range extends throughout the western US and Canada from southern Saskatchewan to British Columbia. Its habitats include dunes, mountains, meadows, streams, and sage-lands. It is also found in open areas or openings in woods near its larval host.

Larvae feed on species of lupines (Lupinus). Adults feed on nectar from flowers of Eriogonum species and other composites.

Wingspan: 21 to 32 mm.

== Similar species ==
- Greenish blue (Icaricia saepiolus)
- Silvery blue (Glaucopsyche lygdamus)

== Subspecies ==
- Icaricia icarioides albihalos
- Icaricia icarioides argusmontana
- Icaricia icarioides atascadero
- Icaricia icarioides austinorum
- Icaricia icarioides blackmorei – Puget blue
- Icaricia icarioides buchholzi
- Icaricia icarioides eosierra
- Icaricia icarioides evius
- Icaricia icarioides fenderi – Fender's blue
- Icaricia icarioides fulla
- Icaricia icarioides helios
- Icaricia icarioides icarioides
- Icaricia icarioides inyo
- Icaricia icarioides lycea
- Icaricia icarioides missionensis – Mission blue
- Icaricia icarioides montis
- Icaricia icarioides moroensis
- Icaricia icarioides nigrafem
- Icaricia icarioides panamintina
- Icaricia icarioides parapheres
- Icaricia icarioides pardalis
- Icaricia icarioides pembina
- Icaricia icarioides pheres (extinct)†
- Icaricia icarioides sacre
- Icaricia icarioides santana
