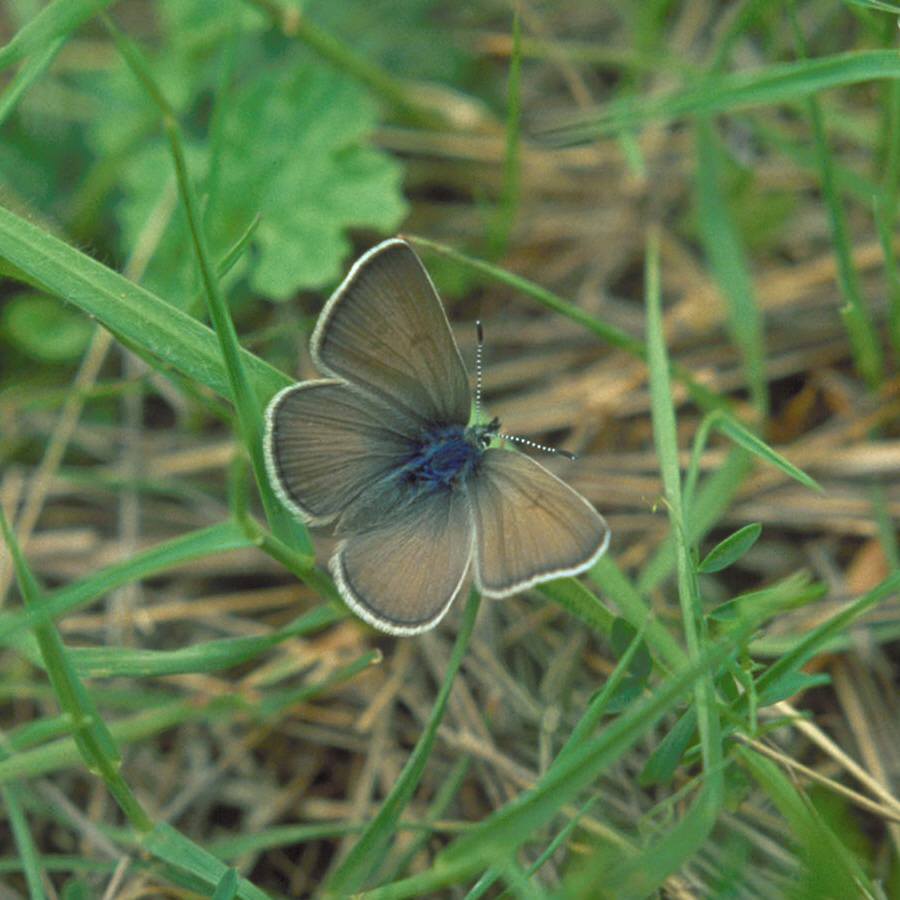

Conservation status
- Threatened (ESA)

Scientific classification
- Kingdom: Animalia
- Phylum: Arthropoda
- Class: Insecta
- Order: Lepidoptera
- Family: Lycaenidae
- Genus: Icaricia
- Species: I. icarioides
- Subspecies: I. i. fenderi

Trinomial name
- Icaricia icarioides fenderi (Macy, 1931)

Synonyms
- Plebejus icarioides fenderi

= Fender's blue butterfly =

Endangered subspecies of Boisduval's blue

Fender's blue butterfly (Icaricia icarioides fenderi) is a subspecies of Boisduval's blue (Icaricia icarioides) endemic to the Willamette Valley of northwestern Oregon, United States. The potential range of the butterfly extends from south and west of Portland, OR to south of Eugene, OR. The butterfly is host-specific on the Kincaid's lupine, which it relies on for reproduction and growth. The male and female can be identified by their difference in wing color. The Fender's blue butterfly was added to the endangered species list in January 2000, but as of February of 2023, has been reclassified as "threatened". The Fender's blue butterfly population has increased over the past 20 years and projected to increase more through conservation efforts. In Willamette Valley, Oregon, there are currently 90 sites filled with Fender's blue.

== History ==
The subspecies was first documented in the 1920s and was described to science in 1931 by biologist Ralph Macy, who named it for his friend, Kenneth Fender, an entomologist and mail carrier. The subspecies was not seen after the 1930s and was presumed extinct due to habitat loss of Kincaid's Lupine. Small populations were rediscovered in 1989 by Dr. Paul Hammond. Its eponym, Fender, had died 2 years earlier. In 2013, Fender's blue butterfly was classified in the genus Icaricia.

== Morphology ==
All Fender's blue butterflies have a wingspan of approximately one inch. Males of this species can be identified by the upper side of their wing having an iridescent sky blue color. The females can be identified by their rust brown wing color. Both sexes have a black border outlined by a white fringe on the dorsal or upper side of their wings. The underside of their wings is a pearly gray color that contains either black or brown spots that are outlined in white. Females are brown to remain more camouflaged.

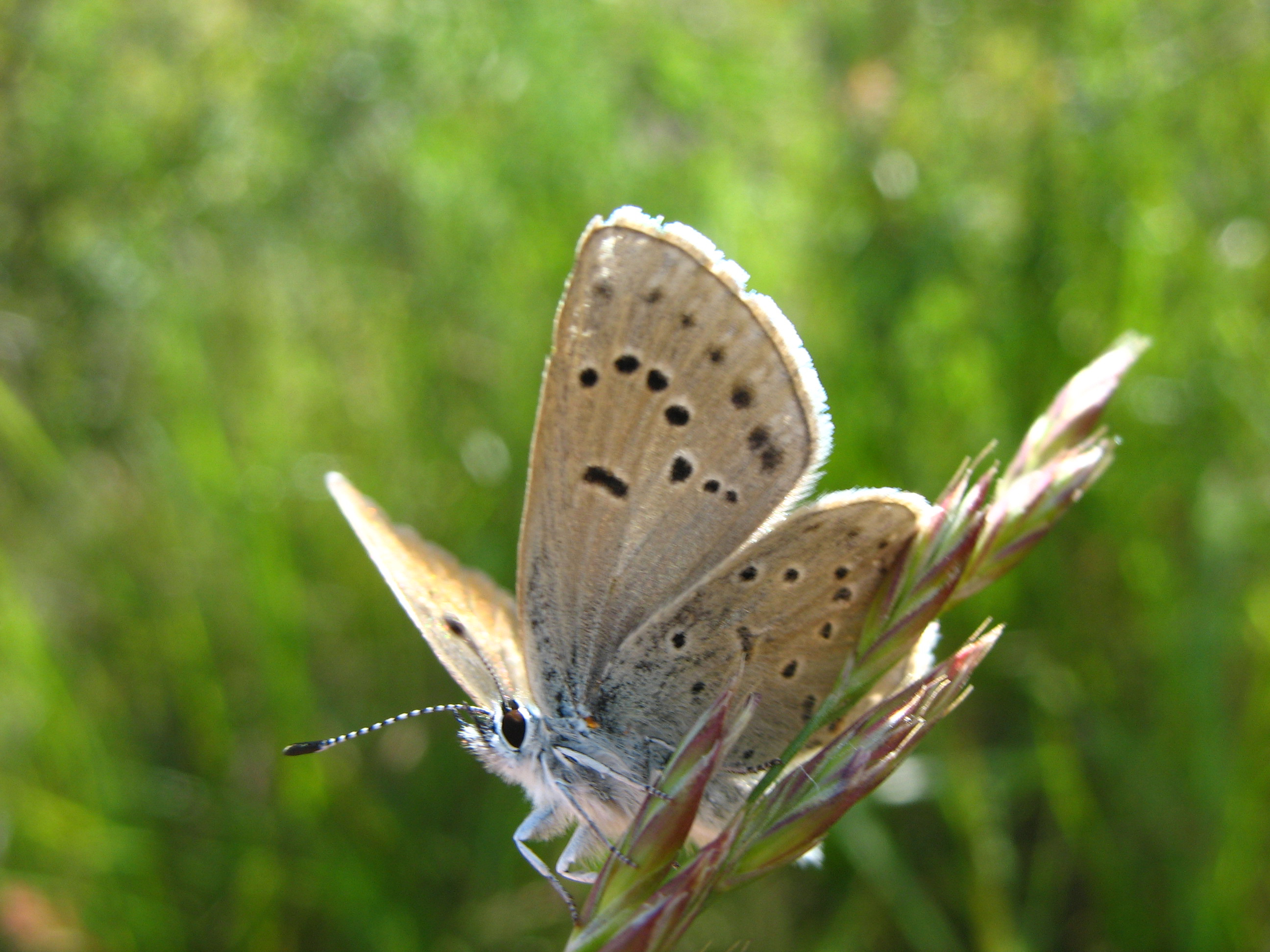
Female Fender's blue butterfly

== Ecology ==
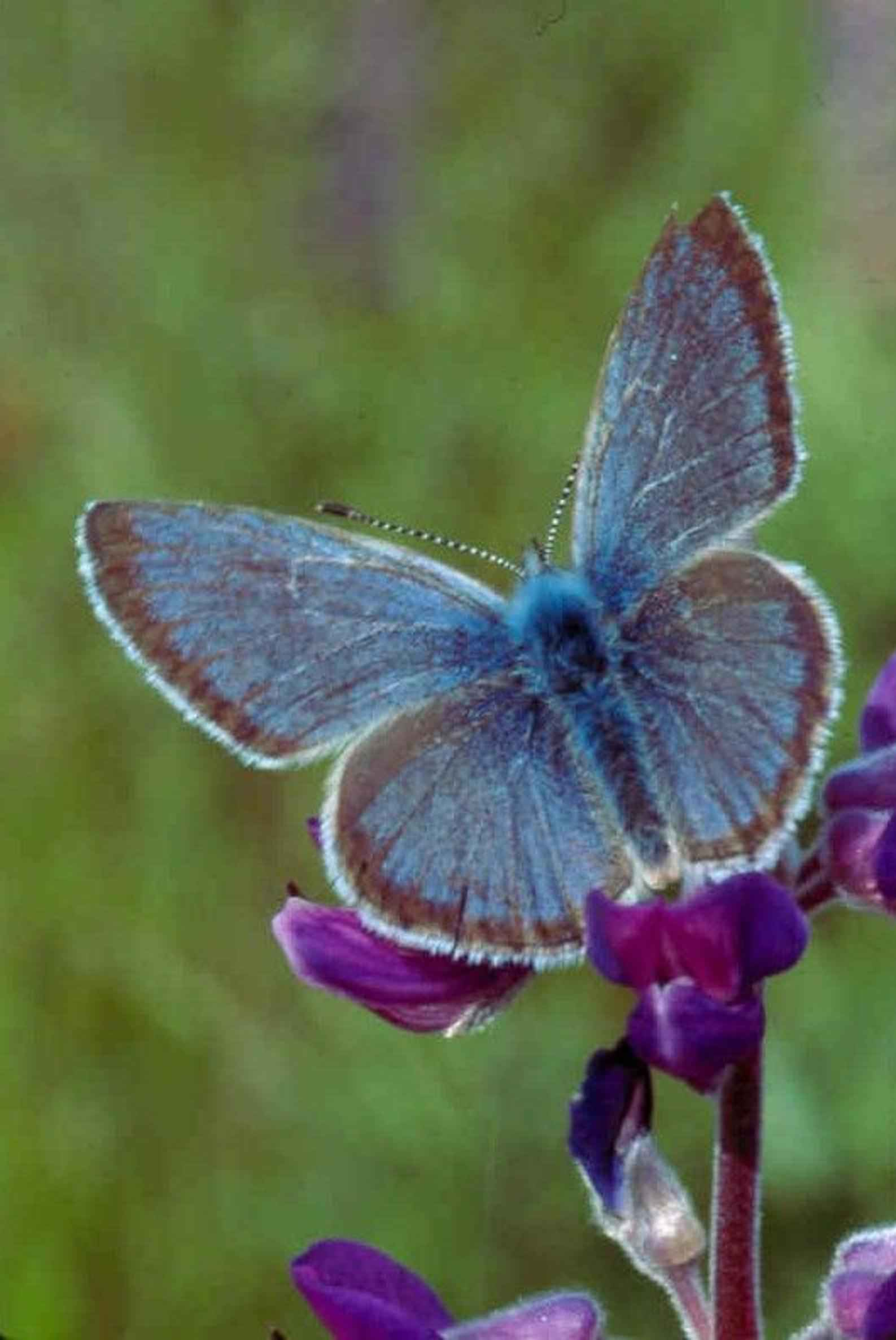
A Fender's blue butterfly on its host plant, the Kincaid's lupine.

=== Host plant ===
Fender's blue butterfly is host-specific on Kincaid's lupine (Lupinus sulphureus kincaidii), a rare subspecies of the common sulphur lupine. Kincaid's lupine is found in grassland habitats in Willamette Valley, Oregon. In January 2000, Kincaid's lupine was listed as a threatened species. Two other species of lupine, Lupinus arbustus (longspur lupine) and Lupinus albicaulis (sickle-keeled lupine), have been documented as host plants as well.

As Fender's blue prefer to feed on the lupine's flowers, reduction in lupine availability limits the butterfly's food sources and distribution. Females in particular prefer native nectar, with a study by Thomas and Schultz finding only 20% of nectar was obtained from nonnative plants. The majority of nectar eaten by Fender's blue butterfly comes from wildflowers in the prairie.

=== Life cycle ===
The life cycle of the Fender's blue butterflies takes a total of one year to complete. Eggs are laid on the underside of the Kincaid's lupine leaves between May and June. Eggs hatch after a few weeks, and larvae feed on Kincaid's lupine leaves until early July. After feeding, larvae migrate down the base of the lupine leaf and enter diapause until activating again in March. Larvae continue to develop until pupation occurs in April. Adult Fender's blue butterflies will then emerge in May. As an adult it lives for no more than three weeks, during which time it mates, feeds, and the female seeks Kincaid's lupines on which to oviposit.

=== Mutualism ===
Fender's blue butterfly has been observed to participate in facultative mutualism with several species of ant, including Prenolepis imparis and Aphaenogaster occidentalis. Butterfly larvae that received attendance from ants were observed to have higher survival rates compared to those that did not.

=== Predation ===
The Fender's blue butterfly is at risk of predation by the carabid beetle Nebria brevicollis. The beetle could prey on the eggs, larvae, pupae, or adult Fender blue's. Both species are known to thrive in similar habitats.

== Habitat destruction ==
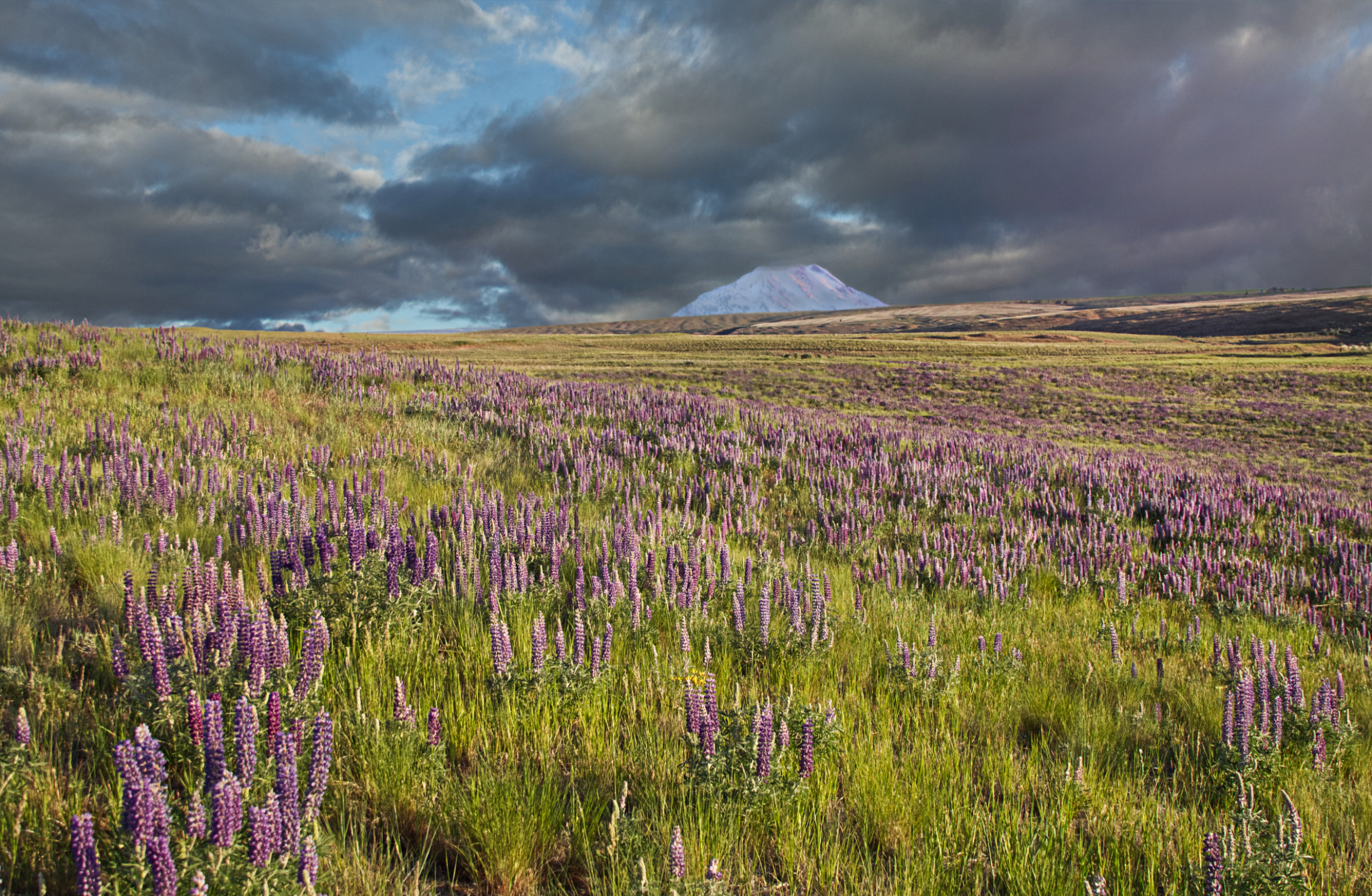
Lupine field Fender's blue butterflies could reside in.

Fender's blue butterfly is endemic to the Willamette Valley in Oregon, where its habitat is fragmented into 13 sections. Observation of butterfly dispersion and flight patterns revealed that butterflies tend to prefer prairie patches with Kincaid's lupine. As fragmentation increases the distance between lupine patches, the butterflies face habitat loss due to their lack of ability to fly from one patch to another. The movement patterns of butterflies were tracked in environments both with and without lupine to understand the impact of their surroundings on their spread rates. In regions abundant with lupine, butterflies showed a slower dispersion rate (less than 3 square meters per second), in contrast to those in lupine-scarce areas, who exhibited significantly faster dispersion rates (over 15 square meters per second). Daily behavior analysis revealed that these butterflies are active for approximately 2.3 hours each day, and through a mark-recapture-release study, it was found that their lifespan averages around 9.5 days. By combining diffusion rates and total active flight hours, the potential distance Fender's blue butterflies could cover over their lifetime. A Fender's blue residing in lupine-rich areas might cover around 0.75 kilometers, whereas one moving between lupine patches could traverse over 2 kilometers. Previously, the Willamette Valley presented a mix of upland and wet prairies, with lupine patches typically not exceeding a 0.5-kilometer distance from each other. During this period, it's likely that Fender's blue butterflies had a greater chance of moving between these patches. The increasing presence of anthropogenic structures, agriculture, and urbanization threaten habitat fragmentation, as roads can prevent movement and introduce mortality risk from vehicles.

Invasive plant species are also contributing to habitat destruction, such as Himalayan blackberry and Scotch broom. Both of these species thrive in the Kincaid's lupine environment and have the ability to overtake resources from the Kincaid's lupine. Invasive grasses contribute to habitat destruction due to its high obscuring Kincaid's Lupine. The invasive grasses have tall growth, which inhibits sunlight from reaching the lupine plants and wildflowers. Currently, only approximately 1% of the prairie land remains a suitable habitat. Since 2000, conservation efforts have helped recover the grasslands in the Willamette Valley.

== Conservation ==
Fender's blue butterfly is a protected species in The Nature Conservancy's Willow Creek Preserve in Eugene, which extends into the Willamette Valley. In January 2000, Fender's blue butterfly was added to the Endangered Species List by the U.S. Fish and Wildlife Service. In January 2023, U.S. Fish and Wildlife Service proposed for Fender's blue butterfly to be downlisted to a threatened species to take effect on February 13, 2023. However, since it is an invertebrate, it is not protected by the Oregon Endangered Species Act. The largest known populations now exist in the Baskett Slough National Wildlife Refuge. A 2014 study reintroduced this subspecies to the William L. Finley National Wildlife Refuge.

Controlled burning of prairie habitats is practiced in the preserve to maximize butterfly population growth. In October 2006, approximately 3,010 acres of land in Oregon was legally determined to be a protected habitat for Fender's blue butterfly. As of 2021, the protected habitat has seen an increase in restoration. Various conservation agencies have also worked with private landowners, approximately 96% of the Willamette Valley, about utilizing their land for habitat restoration for Fender's blue butterfly.
