= Baskett Slough National Wildlife Refuge =

Protected area in Oregon, United States

- IUCN category IV (habitat/species management area)
- Location within Oregon
- Location: Polk County, Oregon, USA
- Nearest city: Dallas, OR
- Coordinates: 44.9676178°N 123.2601021°W
- Area: 2,492 acres (1,008 ha)
- Established: 1965
- Governing body: U.S. Fish and Wildlife Service
- Website: Baskett Slough NWR

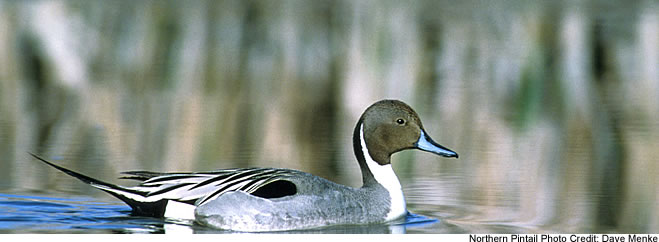
Northern pintail, Baskett Slough National Wildlife Refuge

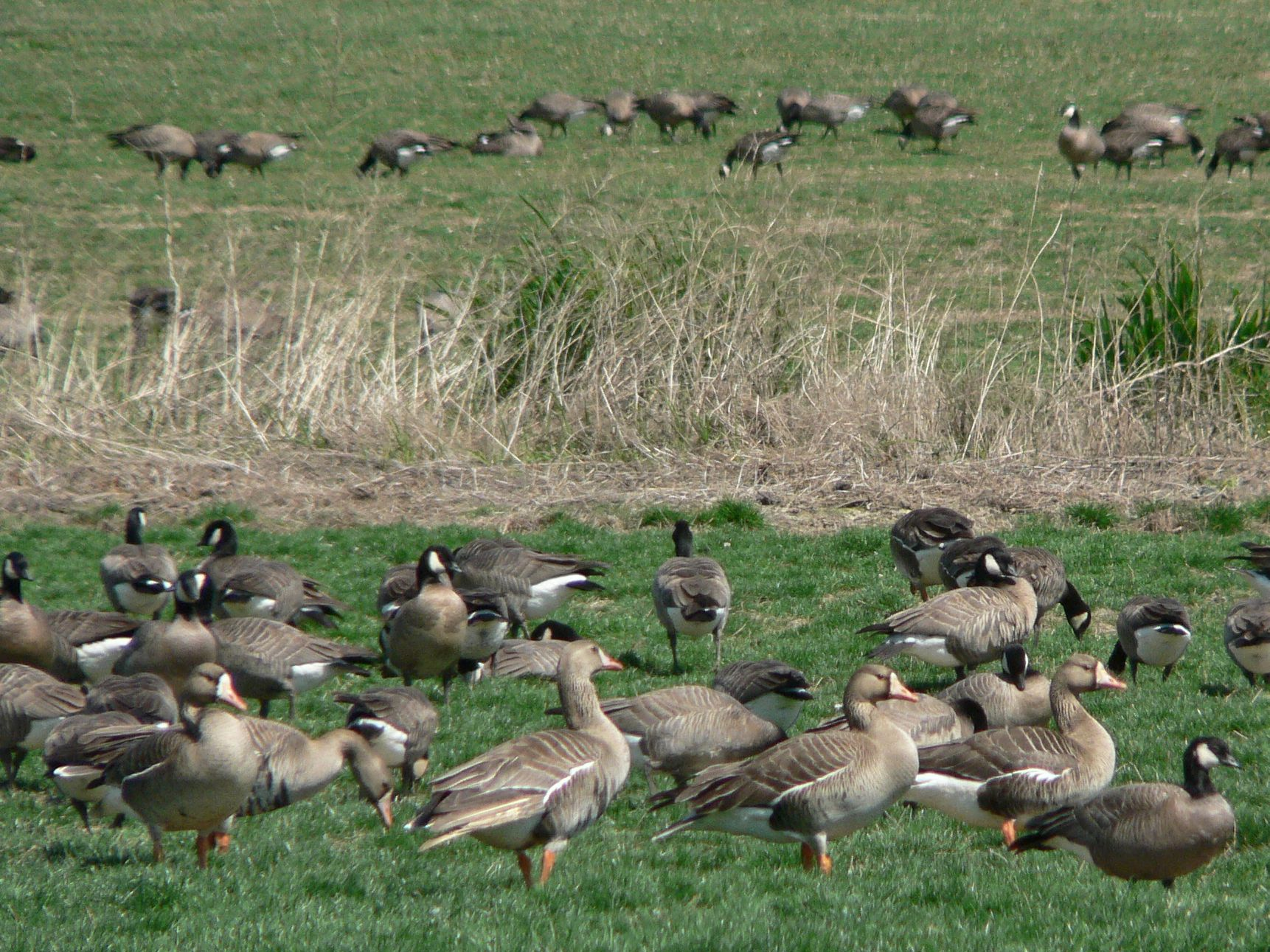
White-fronted geese (Anser albifrons) with Cackling Geese (Branta hutchinsii) congregate on the refuge.

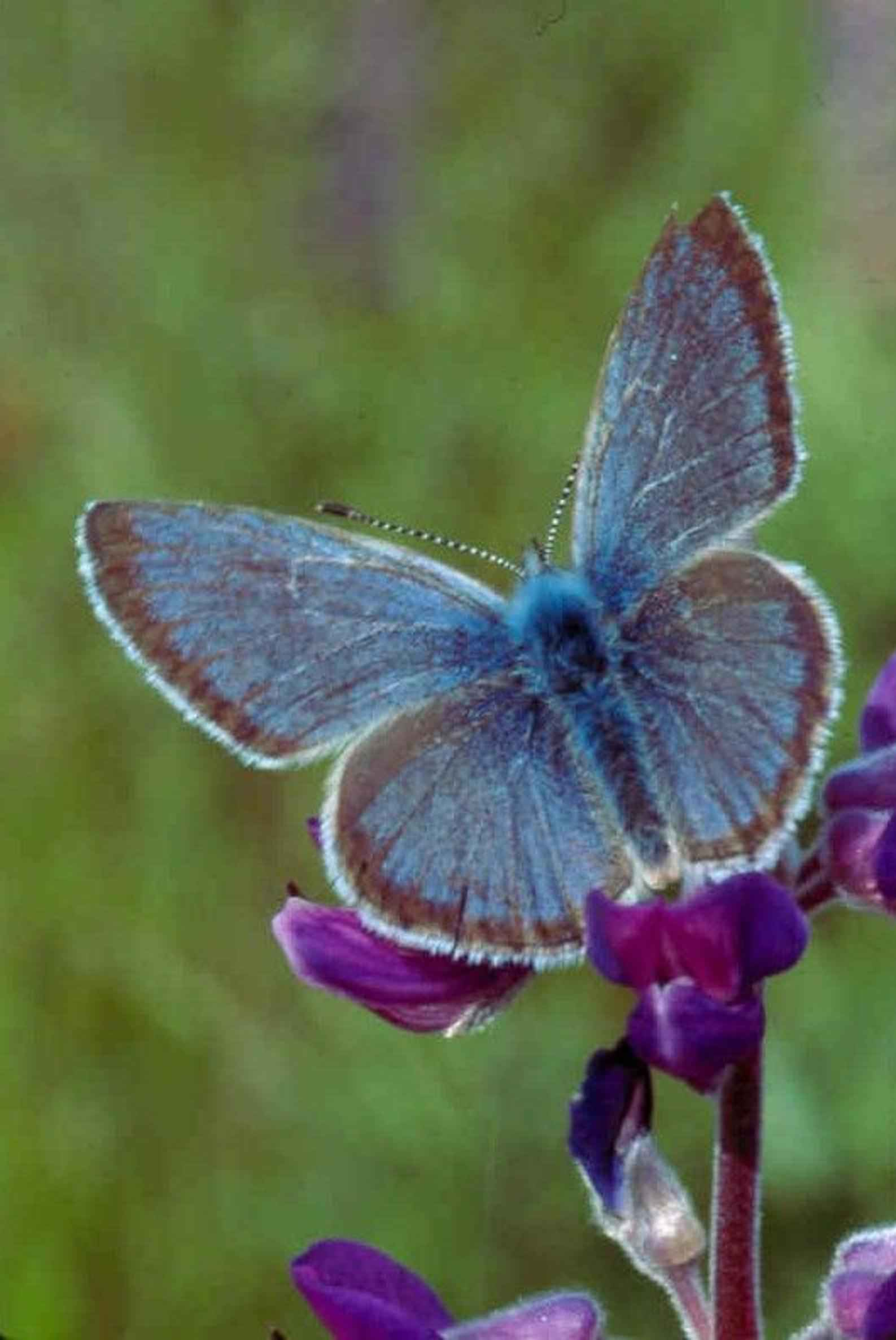
Fender's blue butterfly is a threatened butterfly species. Baskett Slough NWR has the largest known remaining population.

Baskett Slough National Wildlife Refuge is in northwestern Oregon, 10 miles (16 km) west of Salem in Polk County. The Refuge consists of 1,173 acres (4.75 km^{2}) of cropland, which provide forage for wintering geese, 300 acres (1.2 km^{2}) of forests, 550 acres (2.2 km^{2}) of grasslands, and 500 acres (2.0 km^{2}) of shallow water seasonal wetlands and 35 acres (0.14 km^{2}) of permanent open water. In 1965, Baskett Slough National Wildlife Refuge was created to help ensure some of the original habitat remained for species preservation. The refuge is managed by the U.S. Fish and Wildlife Service, an agency of the U.S. Department of the Interior.

Situated in open farmland near the eastern foothills of the Oregon Coast Range with the broad Willamette Valley and the Cascade Range to the east, elevations range from 185 to 414 feet (56 to 126 m) MSL. The Willamette Valley, with its mild, rainy winter climate, is an ideal environment for wintering waterfowl. The valley was once a rich mix of wildlife habitats with extensive wetlands, meandering stream channels and vast seasonal marshes. The valley is now a mix of farmland and growing cities, with few areas remaining for wildlife.

== Flora and fauna ==
As with the other refuges within the Willamette Valley National Wildlife Refuge Complex, the primary management goal of Baskett Slough National Wildlife Refuge is to provide high quality wintering habitat for geese, especially the dusky Canada goose (Branta canadensis subsp. occidentalis), so as to ensure healthy, viable goose populations while minimizing goose browse damage to crops on private agricultural lands. Unlike most other Canada geese, dusky Canada geese have limited summer and winter ranges. They nest on Alaska's Copper River Delta and winter almost exclusively in the Willamette Valley. Habitat loss, predation, and hunting caused a decrease in their population. Dusky Canada geese usually appear at the Refuge in the fall and use it as their last stop before starting the spring journey back to their Alaska nesting grounds. During the winter of 2001, a survey found a total of 35,988 geese, swans and ducks in the refuge.

By resting in undisturbed areas on the refuges, wintering geese regain energy reserves required for migration and nesting. Because of their need for a quiet resting area, the majority of the refuge interior is closed to public entry while the geese are in residence, from October 1 through April 30.

The croplands, rolling oak-covered hills, grass fields, and shallow wetlands of the Refuge are home to many wildlife species. Cinnamon teal, mallards, bufflehead and hooded mergansers are just a few of the duck species that are common during the winter months. Great blue herons and other shorebirds feed along the waters edge. Red-tailed hawks can be seen flying over the refuge and a small number of bald eagles winter on the refuge. In addition to the abundant bird life, 30 species of mammals, 8 species of amphibians, and 10 species of reptiles occur here. The largest remaining population of the endangered Fender's blue butterfly is found on the refuge. Wildlife and wildlands observation, photography, hiking, and environmental education and interpretation are the major public use activities allowed on the refuge.

== Recreation ==
Visitor facilities include the Baskett Slough information and wildlife viewing kiosk, located on the north side of Oregon Route 22 about 2 miles (3.2 km) west of the intersection with Oregon Route 99W. About 5 miles (8 km) of walking trails include the year-round Baskett Butte Loop Trail, and the Morgan Lake and Inter-Tie Trails (open April 1 – Sept 30th). The refuge is only open during daytime hours and in keeping with the focus of habitat and wildlife preservation, no hunting or fishing is allowed.

Recently, the refuge has increased efforts to restore and expand riparian, wet prairie, upland prairie and oak savanna habitats. The oak savanna habitat on the Refuge supports the largest surviving population of the endangered Fender's blue butterfly which feeds upon the threatened Kincaid's lupine plant.

The Refuge was named for George J. Baskett, an early Willamette Valley settler, who was a thoroughbred horse breeder.

== See also ==
- List of National Wildlife Refuges
