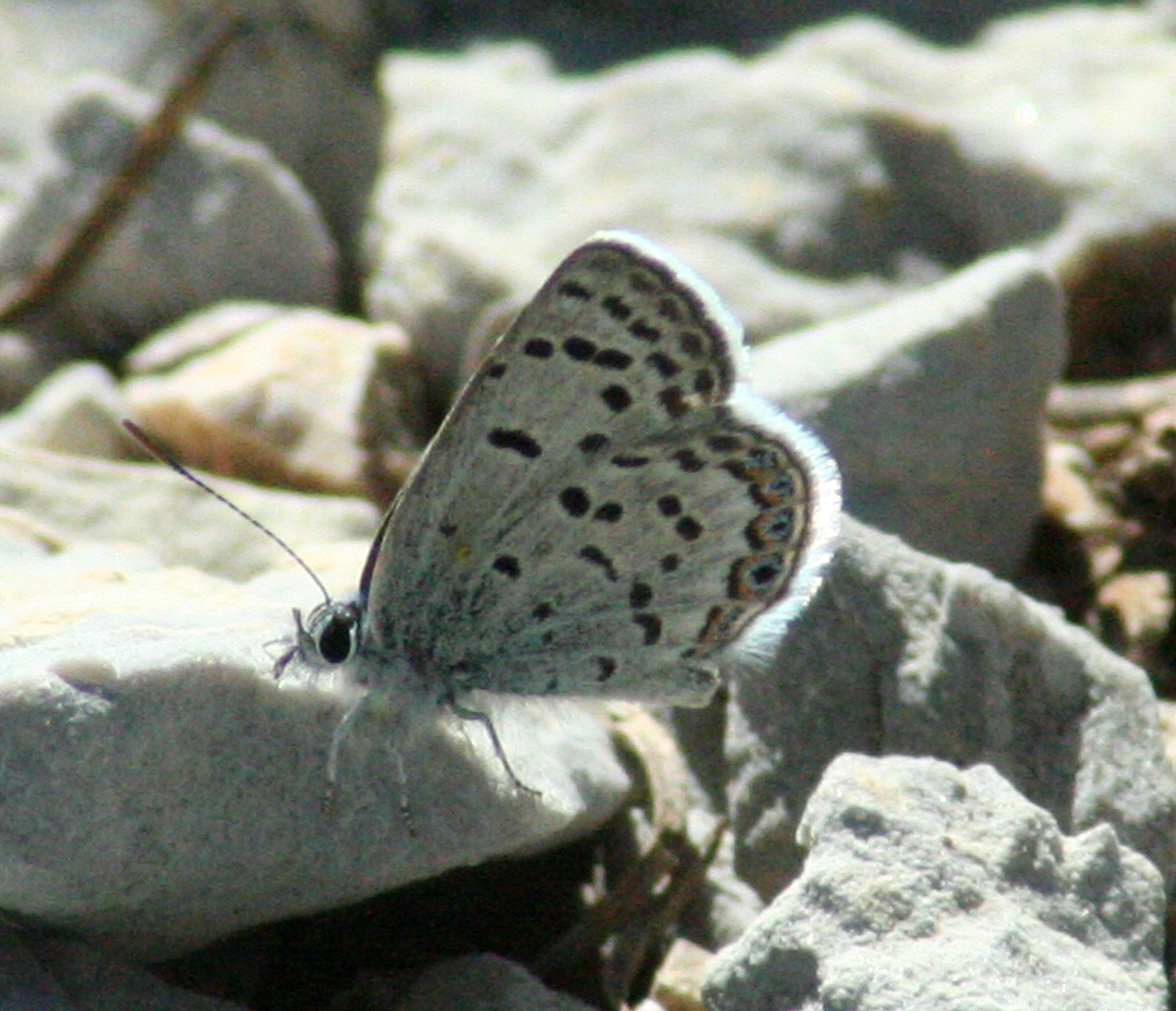

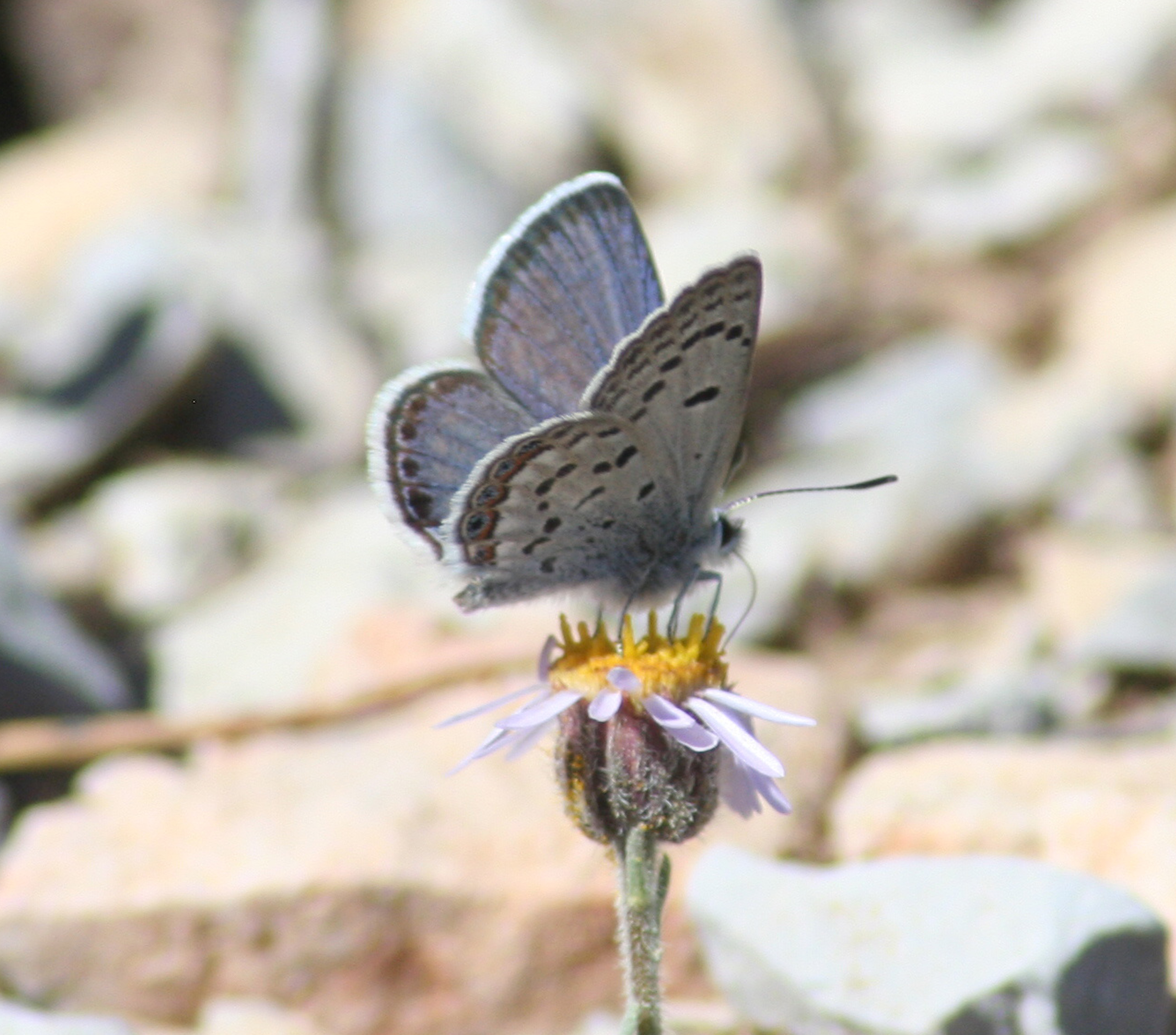

Scientific classification
- Kingdom: Animalia
- Phylum: Arthropoda
- Clade: Pancrustacea
- Class: Insecta
- Order: Lepidoptera
- Family: Lycaenidae
- Genus: Icaricia
- Species: I. shasta

Binomial name
- Icaricia shasta (W.H. Edwards, 1862)

Synonyms
- Lycaena shasta W.H. Edwards, 1862; Lycaena zelmira C. & R. Felder, [1865]; Lycaena calchas Behr, 1867; Rusticus shasta (W.H. Edwards, 1862); Aricia shasta (W.H. Edwards, 1862); Lycaeides shasta (W.H. Edwards, 1862); Plebejus shasta (W.H. Edwards, 1862)

= Shasta blue =

Species of butterfly

Icaricia shasta, the Shasta blue, is a butterfly of the family Lycaenidae. It is found from the northwestern United States to southern Saskatchewan and Alberta.

The wingspan is 20–22 mm. Adults are on wing from June to August.

The larvae feed on Lupinus lyalli, Astragalus spatulatus, Astragalus calycosus, and Trifolium dasphyllum.

== Subspecies ==
There are six subspecies of Icaricia shasta. (Note, or seven in older schemes)

- I. s. calchas (Behr, 1867)
- I. s. charlestonensis (Austin, 1980)
- I. s. minnehaha (Scudder, 1874)
- I. s. pallidissima Austin in T. Emmel, 1998
- I. s. pitkinensis (Ferris, 1976)
- I. s. shasta (W.H. Edwards, 1862)

See also

- I. s. platazul Scott, 2006, later treated as a junior subjective synonym of I. s. minnehaha (Scudder, 1874) per Pelham, 2023 (online catalog)
