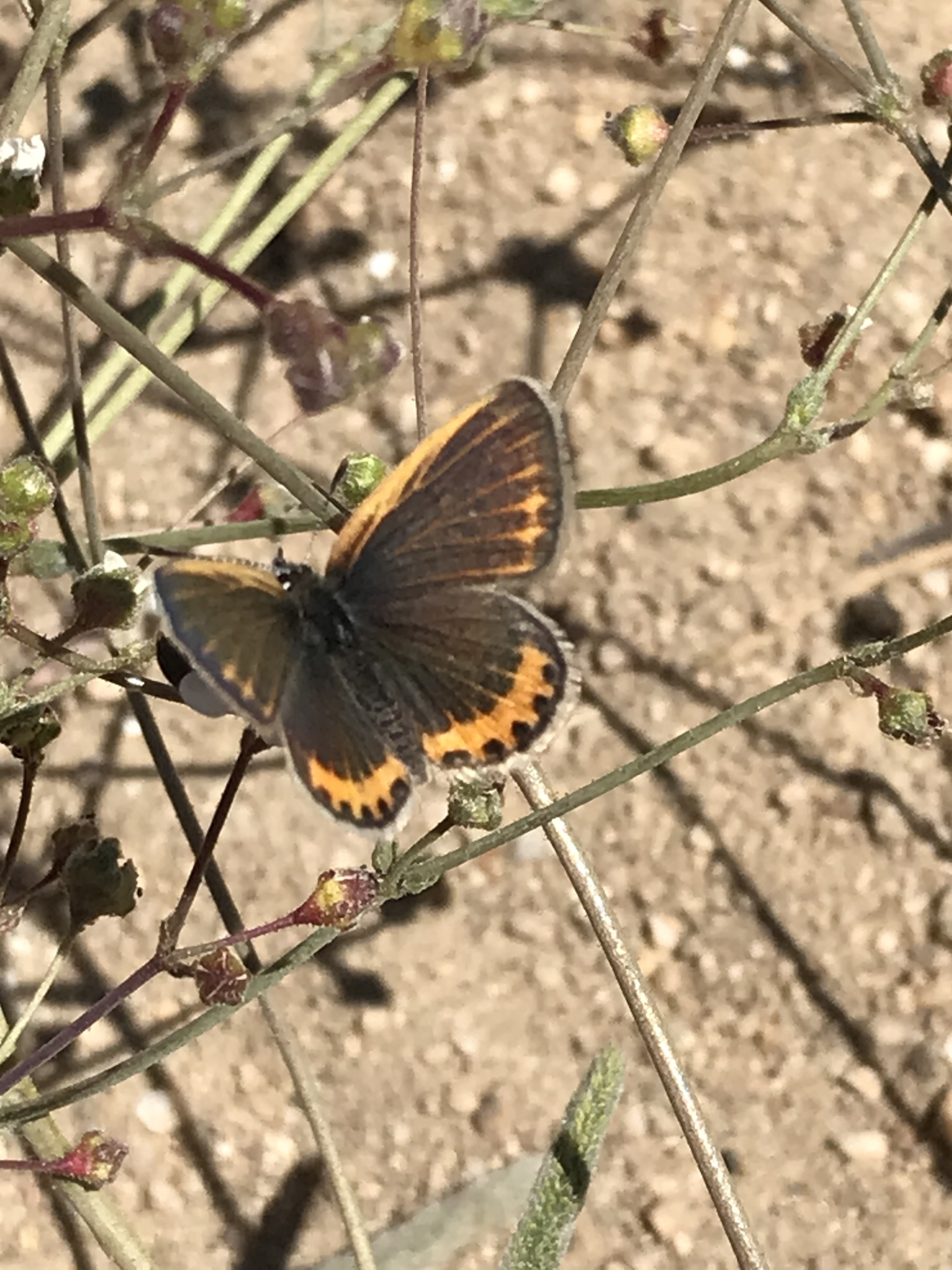
- Icaricia neurona

Conservation status
- Imperiled (NatureServe)

Scientific classification
- Kingdom: Animalia
- Phylum: Arthropoda
- Class: Insecta
- Order: Lepidoptera
- Family: Lycaenidae
- Genus: Icaricia
- Species: I. neurona

Binomial name
- Icaricia neurona (Skinner, 1902)

Synonyms
- Lycaena neurona Skinner, 1902; Aricia neurona (Skinner, 1902); Plebejus neurona (Skinner, 1902)

= Icaricia neurona =

Veined blue

Species of butterfly

Icaricia neurona, the veined blue, is a species of blue in the butterfly family Lycaenidae. It is endemic to the various mountain ranges of Southern California.

The MONA or Hodges number for Icaricia neurona is 4382.
