= Willamette Valley National Wildlife Refuge Complex =

Willamette Valley National Wildlife Refuge Complex is a National Wildlife Refuge complex in the state of Oregon.

== Refuges within the complex ==
- Ankeny National Wildlife Refuge, located at 44.801389°N 123.063889°W.
- Baskett Slough National Wildlife Refuge, located at 44.9525°N 123.269444°W.
- William L. Finley National Wildlife Refuge, located at 44.418333°N 123.324444°W.
- Willamette Valley Conservation Area
