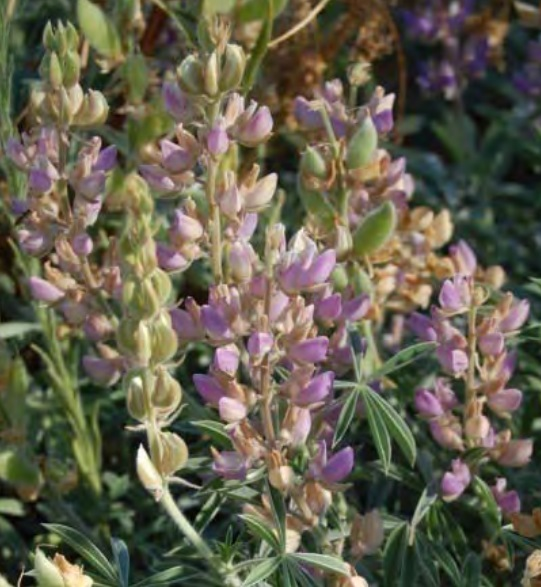

Scientific classification
- Kingdom: Plantae
- Clade: Embryophytes
- Clade: Tracheophytes
- Clade: Spermatophytes
- Clade: Angiosperms
- Clade: Eudicots
- Clade: Rosids
- Order: Fabales
- Family: Fabaceae
- Subfamily: Faboideae
- Genus: Lupinus
- Species: L. formosus

Binomial name
- Lupinus formosus Greene

= Lupinus formosus =

Species of legume

Lupinus formosus, the summer lupine or western lupine, is a species of flowering plant in the legume family, Fabaceae. It is native to California and Oregon in the United States.

Lupinus formosus has been cited as a poisonous plant. Although it is not endangered it faces eradication in some areas at the hands of cattle farmers as it has been implicated in crooked calf disease. This lupine, along with five others, is poisonous from the time it starts growth in the spring until the seed pods shatter in late summer or early fall. However, the younger the plant the more toxic it is.

Summer lupine is one of three piperidine alkaloid containing plants that have poisonous effects on livestock. It, along with poison hemlock (Conium maculatum) and tree tobacco (Nicotiana glauca), induced "multiple congenital contractures (MCC) and palatoschisis in goat kids when their dams were gavaged with the plant during gestation." The skeletal abnormalities included fixed extension of the carpal, tarsal and fetlock joints, scoliosis, lordosis, torticollis and rib cage problems. The clinical signs of toxicity in sheep, cattle and pigs included, ataxia, incoordination, muscular weakness, prostration and death.

It inhabits areas of dry slopes beneath pine trees, clay soils, grasslands, coniferous forests, and areas in the San Jacinto, Santa Rosa and San Gabriel Mountains. Its distribution extends across the state of California except for the eastern deserts and the plateaus east of the Sierra Nevada. This lupine blooms from April to August. It is one of the foodplants of the endangered mission blue butterfly.

There are two varieties. Lupinus formosus var. robustus is confined to the Sierra Nevada and the Southern Coast Ranges of California, while var formosus is more widespread.

It is a larval host to the Acmon blue, arrowhead blue, Melissa blue, silvery blue, and sooty hairstreak.
