= Ankeny National Wildlife Refuge =

Protected area in Oregon, United States

- IUCN category IV (habitat/species management area)
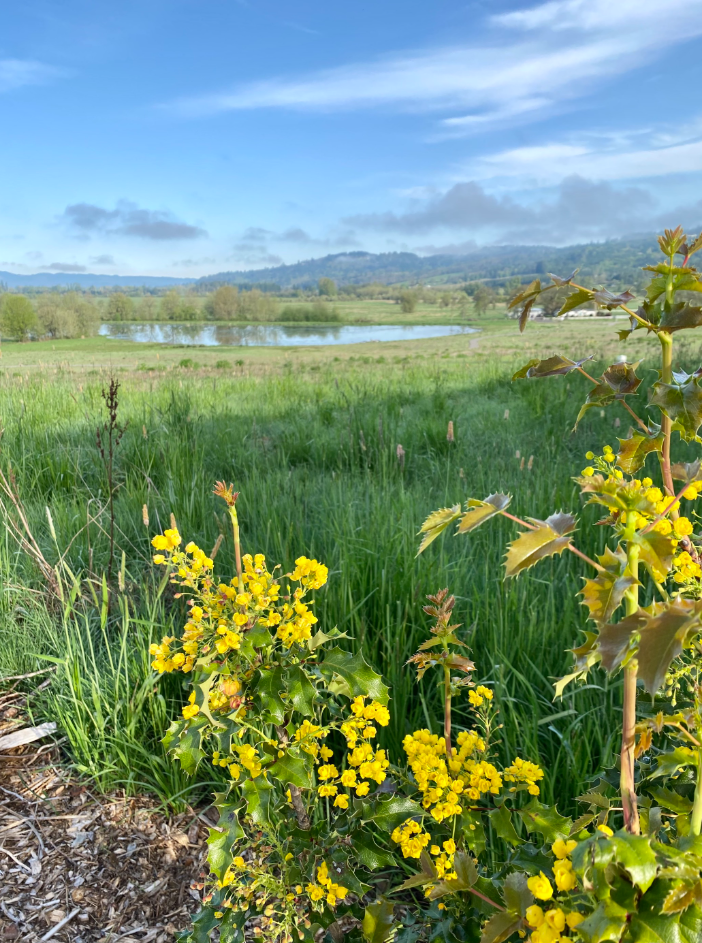
- Oregon grape (Berberis aquifolium) in bloom at Ankeny National Wildlife Refuge on May 3, 2023.

- Location within Oregon Location within the United States
- Location: Marion County, Oregon
- Nearest city: Salem, Oregon
- Coordinates: 44.7840097°N 123.0778731°W
- Area: 2,796 acres (1,132 ha)
- Established: 1965
- Governing body: U.S. Fish and Wildlife Service
- Website: Ankeny NWR

Ankeny National Wildlife Refuge is located in the fertile Willamette Valley of northwestern Oregon, 12 miles (19 km) south of Salem. The valley was once a rich mix of wildlife habitats. Valley wetlands were once extensive, with meandering stream channels and vast seasonal marshes. Today, the valley is a mix of farmland and growing cities, with few areas remaining for wildlife.

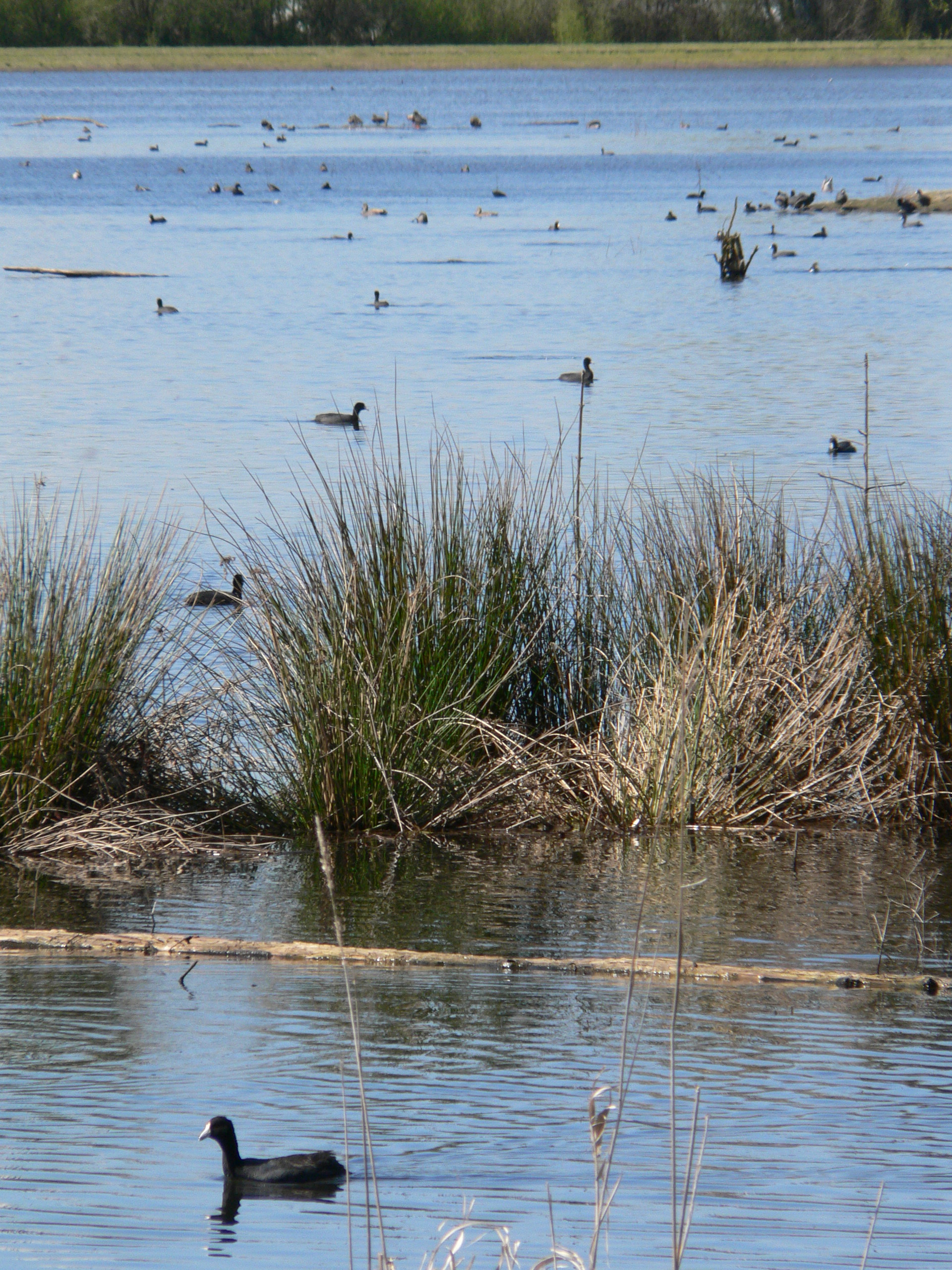
American coot (Fulica americana), northern shoveler (Anas clypeata), gadwall (Anas strepera) and other species on Pintail Marsh

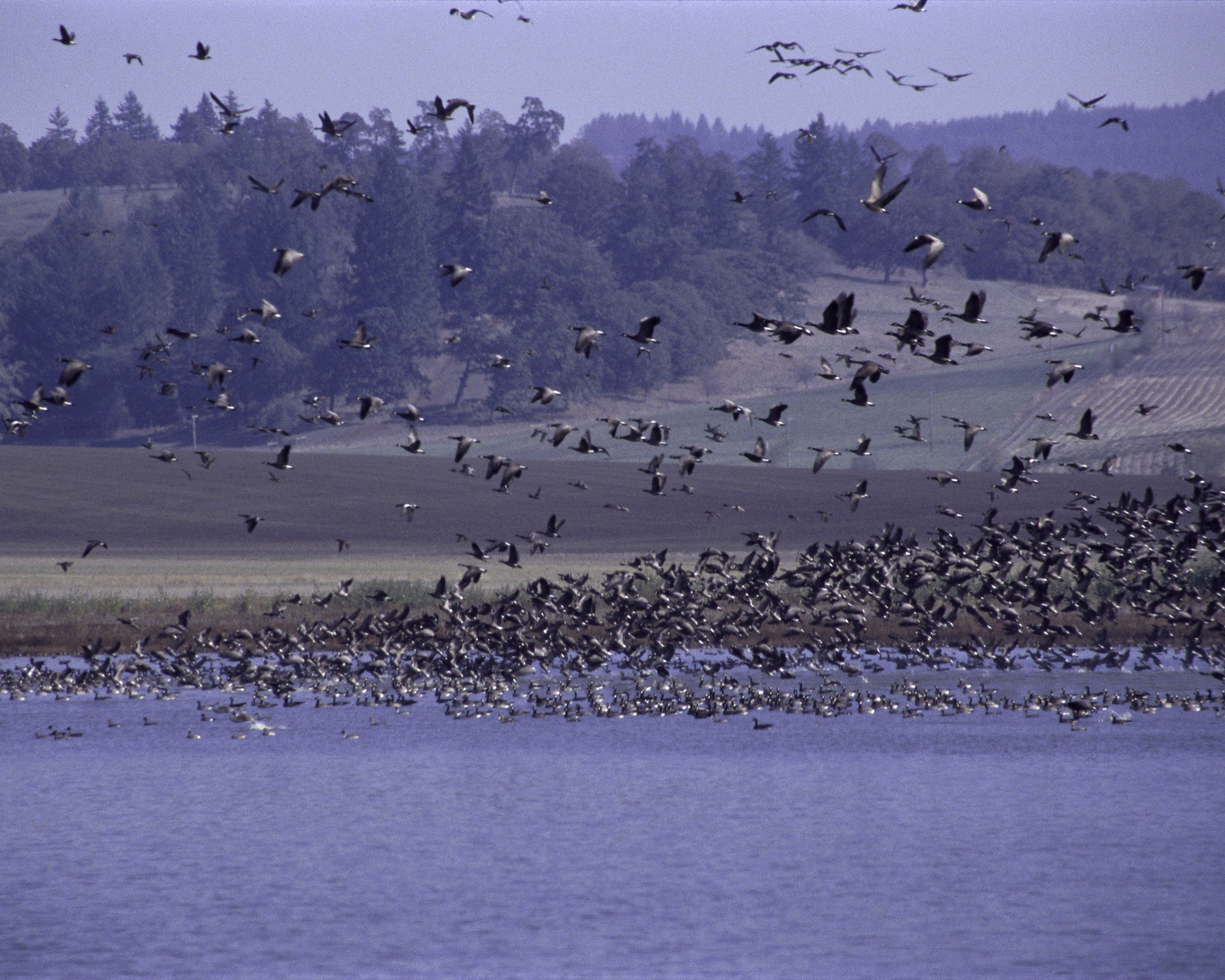
A flock of wild birds in the refuge.

== Location ==
The refuge is situated in open farmland near the confluence of the Santiam and Willamette rivers in the middle of the broad Willamette Valley. Elevations range between 180 and 290 feet (55 to 90 m) MSL. The Willamette Valley, with its mild, rainy winter climate, is an ideal environment for wintering waterfowl. The refuge consists of 1,700 acres (7.143 km^{2}) of cropland, which provide forage for wintering geese, 600 acres (2.4 km^{2}) of riparian zone forests, and 500 acres (2.0 km^{2}) of shallow water seasonal wetlands.

== Purpose and ecology ==
As with the other refuges within the Willamette Valley National Wildlife Refuge Complex, the primary management goal of Ankeny National Wildlife Refuge is to provide high quality wintering habitat for geese, especially the dusky Canada goose (Branta canadensis subsp. occidentalis), to ensure healthy, viable goose populations while minimizing goose browse damage to crops on private agricultural lands. Unlike most other Canada geese, dusky Canada geese have limited summer and winter ranges. They nest on Alaska's Copper River Delta and winter almost exclusively in the Willamette Valley. Habitat loss, predation, and hunting caused a decrease in their population.

The Willamette Valley refuges incorporate an intensive cooperative farming program in order to provide high protein browse (annual ryegrass, perennial ryegrass and fescue) for seven subspecies of wintering Canada geese, with primary emphasis on the dusky subspecies. Under cooperative agreements, area farmers plant refuge fields. Some fields are planted annually and others are mowed or burned to produce the tender, nutritious grasses preferred by geese.

The geese also need water for resting and foraging habitat. Many refuge wetlands occur naturally; others are created by dikes and levees. In some low-lying areas of the refuge, wetlands that were drained or channelized by previous owners have been restored to increase diversity and desirability of habitat for wildlife. The majority of wetlands are being managed as moist soil units, to promote growth of wetland food plants (millet, smartweed, sedges, etc.) used as food by waterfowl and other wildlife. Other goals of the refuge include to protect, restore and enhance populations of threatened and endangered species, to maintain habitats for indigenous species and perpetuate natural diversity, and to provide for environmental education, research, and wildlife oriented recreation.

By resting in undisturbed areas on the refuges, wintering geese regain energy reserves required for migration and nesting. This sanctuary also reduces depredation problems on neighboring private lands by encouraging waterfowl to use refuge resources. Because of their need for a quiet resting area, waterfowl habitat is closed to public entry while the geese are in residence in order to minimize human disturbance. Recently, the refuge has increased efforts to restore and expand riparian forest and wet prairie habitats.

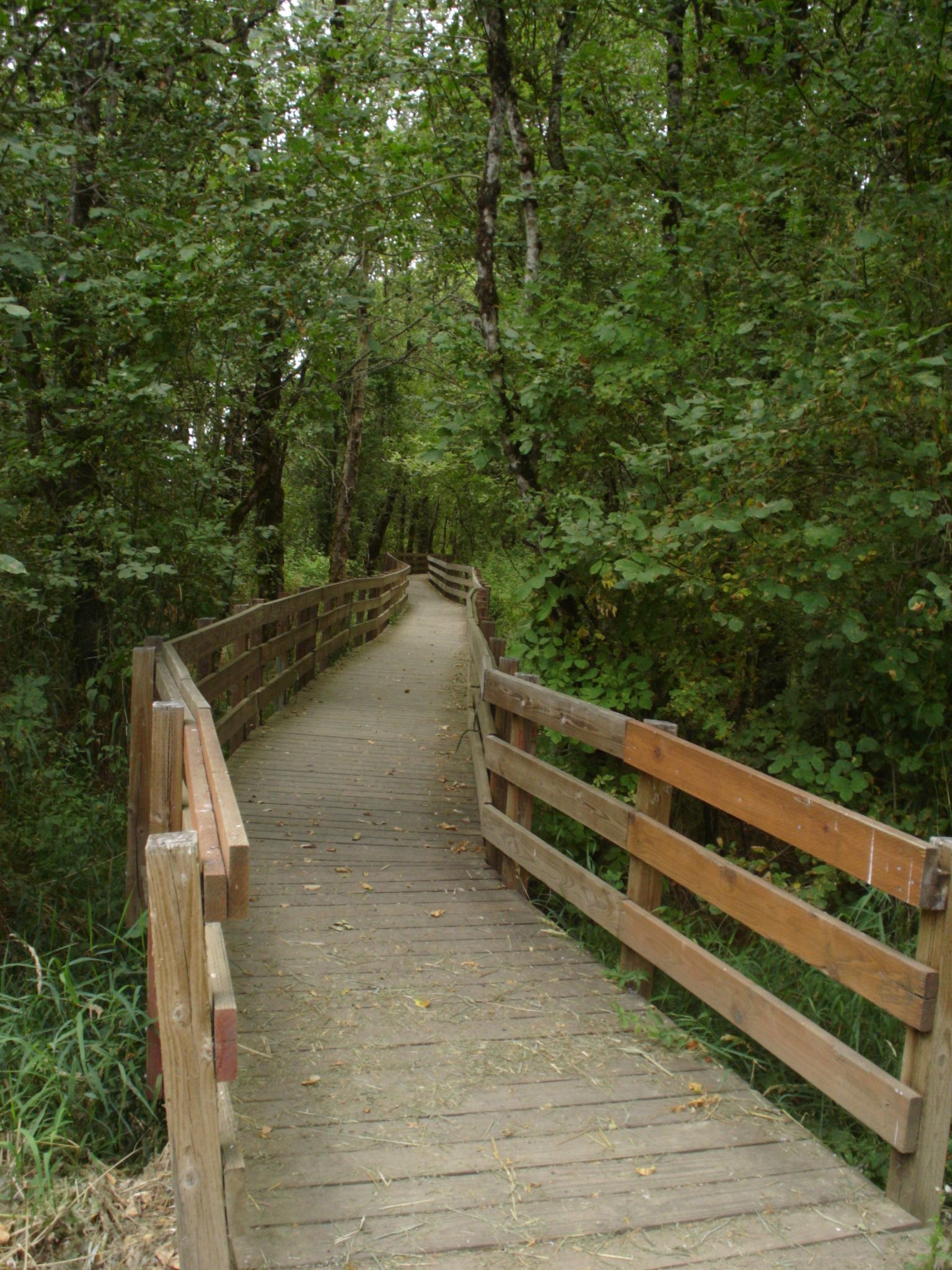
A boardwalk at Ankeny National Wildlife Refuge

Ankeny NWR also provides habitat for a wide variety of other bird species, as well as mammals, reptiles and amphibians.

== Public use ==
Visitor facilities include Ankeny Hill Overlook on Ankeny Hill Road and Eagle Marsh Kiosk on Buena Vista Road, which are open year round. Trails include Pintail & Egret Marsh Boardwalk and the Rail Trail, both on Wintel Road. The Rail Trail and Pintail & Egret Marsh boardwalks are open to the public year-round. The Dike Trails and most other regular trails are closed between October 1 and March 31. Wildlife and wild-lands observation, photography, hiking, and environmental education and interpretation are the major public use activities allowed on the refuge.

== See also ==
- List of National Wildlife Refuges
