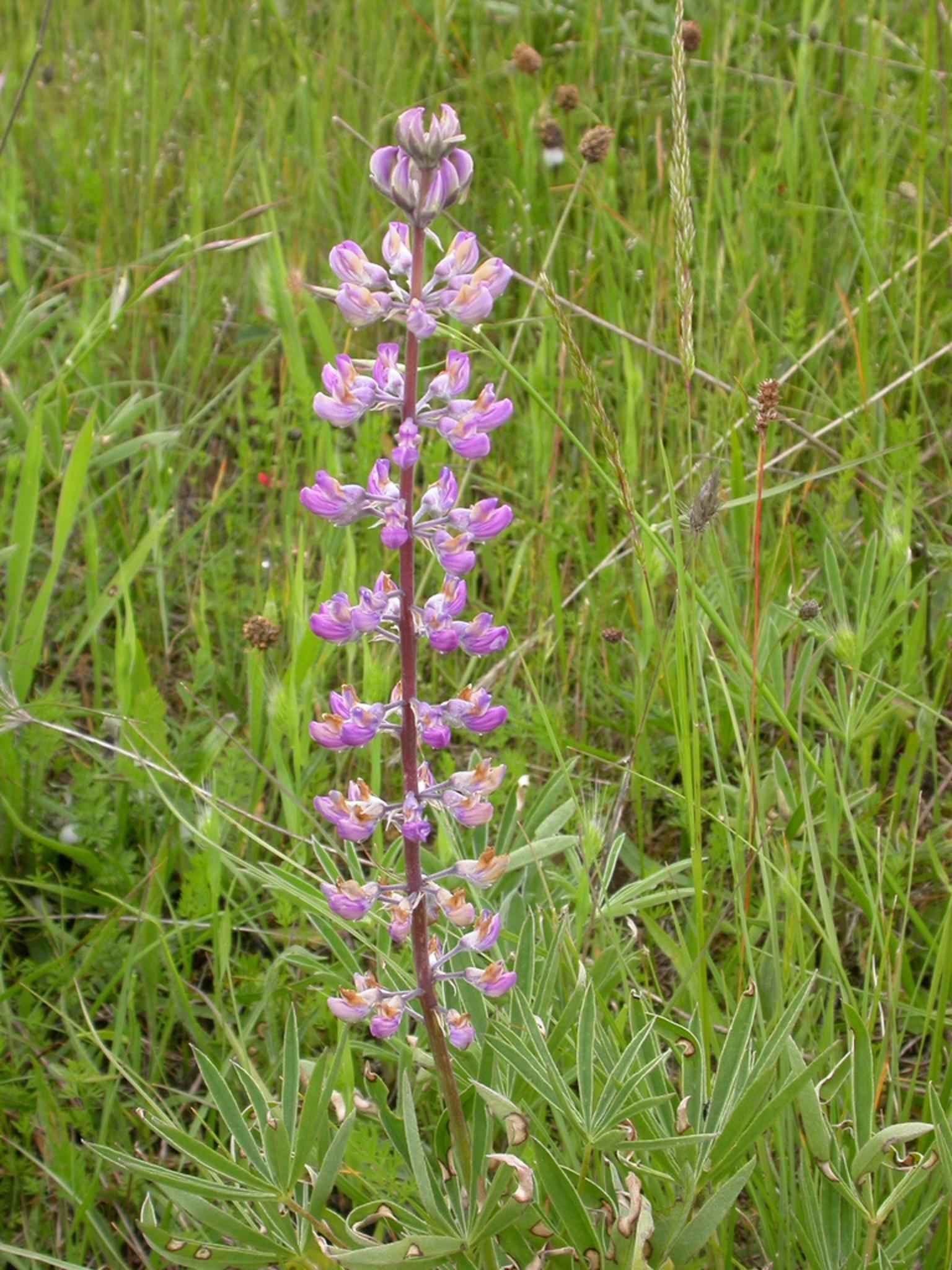
- Lupinus sulphureus ssp. kincaidii

Conservation status
- Secure (NatureServe)

Scientific classification
- Kingdom: Plantae
- Clade: Tracheophytes
- Clade: Angiosperms
- Clade: Eudicots
- Clade: Rosids
- Order: Fabales
- Family: Fabaceae
- Subfamily: Faboideae
- Genus: Lupinus
- Species: L. sulphureus

Binomial name
- Lupinus sulphureus Douglas

Synonyms
- Lupinus sulphureus var. applegateianus C.P.Sm.; Lupinus sulphureus var. echlerianus C.P.Sm.

= Lupinus sulphureus =

Species of legume

Lupinus sulphureus (sulphur lupine, sulphur-flower lupine) is a species of lupine, a flowering plant of the legume family, Fabaceae.

== Description ==
It is a perennial herbaceous plant growing to 40 to 80 cm tall. The leaves are palmately compound, with 7 to 13 leaflets each 2 to 5 cm long. The flowers are produced in whorls on a spike 12 to 20 cm long.

== Taxonomy ==
There are three subspecies:

- Lupinus sulphureus subsp. kincaidii (Kincaid's lupine; syn. L. oreganus subsp. kincaidii). Willamette Valley of western Oregon and parts of southwestern Washington. Flowers purple. Threatened.
- Lupinus sulphureus subsp. subsaccatus. Southern British Columbia south to Oregon. Flowers purple.
- Lupinus sulphureus subsp. sulphureus. Eastern Washington and eastern Oregon. Flowers yellow.

== Distribution and habitat ==
It is native to western North America from southern British Columbia south through Washington to Oregon.

== Ecology ==
Fender's blue butterfly, an endangered species, is host-specific on Kincaid's lupine. Its larvae eat the leaves during the fall and spend the winter among the roots. In spring, the larvae continue to feed on the leaves before pupating.
