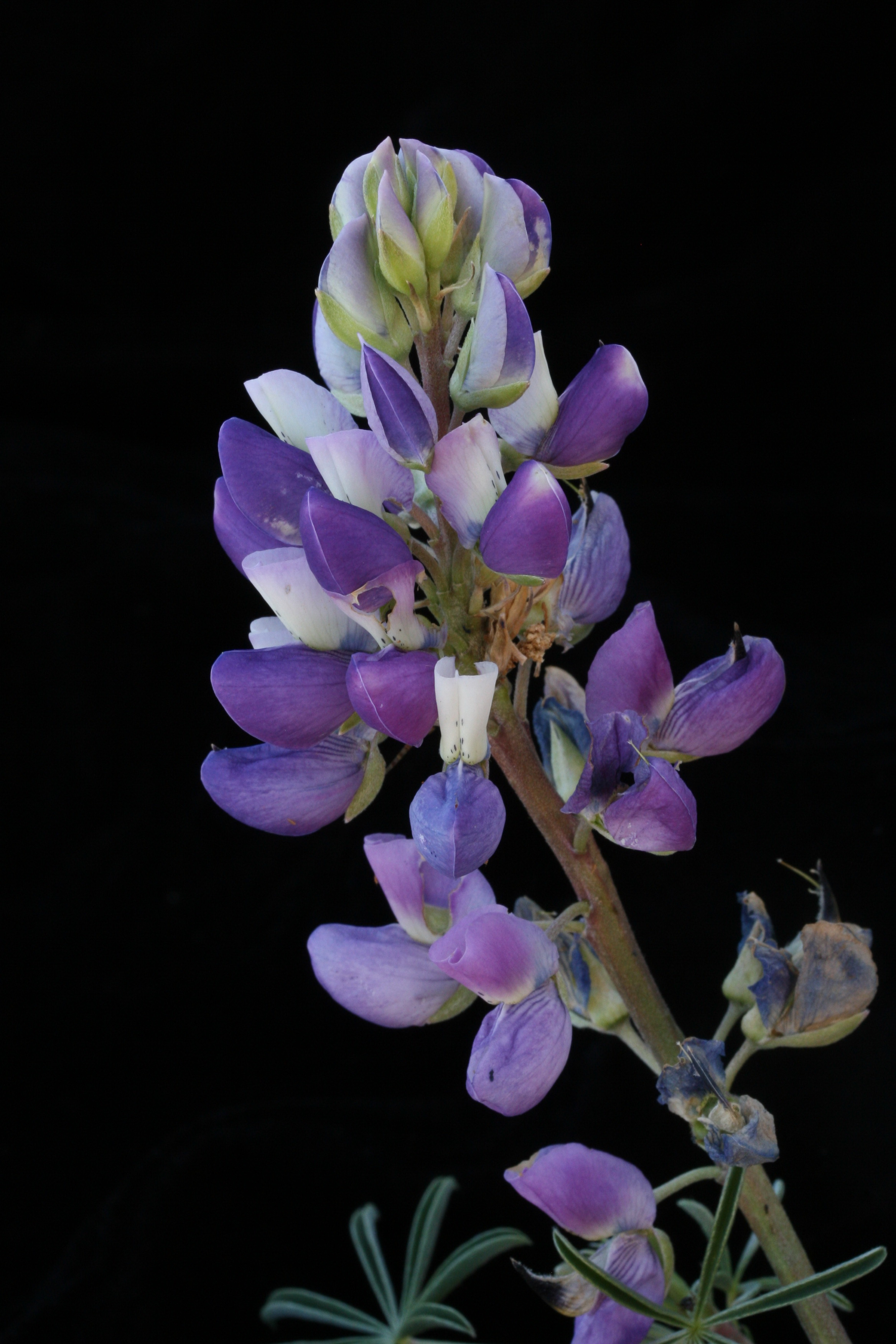

Scientific classification
- Kingdom: Plantae
- Clade: Tracheophytes
- Clade: Angiosperms
- Clade: Eudicots
- Clade: Rosids
- Order: Fabales
- Family: Fabaceae
- Subfamily: Faboideae
- Genus: Lupinus
- Species: L. variicolor

Binomial name
- Lupinus variicolor Steud.

Synonyms
- Lupinus versicolor Lindl.

= Lupinus variicolor =

Species of legume

Lupinus variicolor (varied lupine, manycolored lupine, Lindley's varied lupine or varicolored lupine) is a shrub in the lupine (lupin) genus Lupinus.

Lupinus variicolor is endemic to California where it occurs mostly along the northern coast, though it has also been reported in Sutter County, California. It is one of the foodplants of the endangered mission blue butterfly. It thrives in elevations between sea level and 1,640 ft (500 m).
