= Icaricia saepiolus =

- Both female Plebejus saepiolus amica

Scientific classification
- Kingdom: Animalia
- Phylum: Arthropoda
- Clade: Pancrustacea
- Class: Insecta
- Order: Lepidoptera
- Family: Lycaenidae
- Genus: Icaricia
- Species: I. saepiolus

Binomial name
- Icaricia saepiolus (Boisduval, 1852)

Synonyms
- Lycaena saepiolus Boisduval, 1852; Aricia saepiolus; Cupido saepiolus; Plebejus saepiolus

Species of butterfly

Plebejus saepiolus, formerly Icaricia saepiolus, the greenish blue, is a butterfly of the family Lycaenidae. It is found from the northwestern United States to southern Saskatchewan and Alberta.

The wingspan is 21–28 mm. Adults are on wing from June to August.

The larvae feed on Trifolium monathum, Trifolium longipes, and Trifolium wormskioldii.

== Subspecies ==
- Icaricia saepiolus amica Edwards, 1863
- Icaricia saepiolus aureolus Emmel & Mattoon, 1998
- Icaricia saepiolus gertschi (dos Passos, 1938)
- Icaricia saepiolus hilda (J. & R. Grinnel, 1907)
- Icaricia saepiolus insulanus (Blackmore, 1919)
- Icaricia saepiolus saepiolus (Boisduval, 1852)
- Icaricia saepiolus whitmeri (Brown, 1951)
