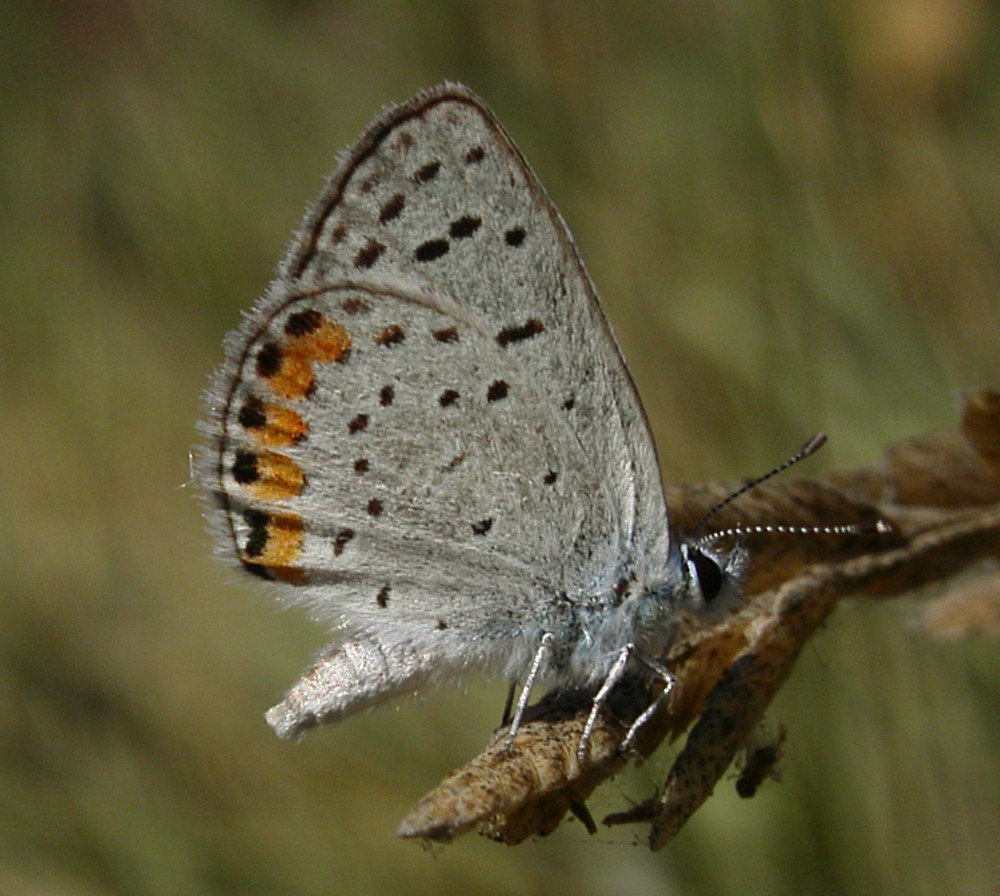

Scientific classification
- Kingdom: Animalia
- Phylum: Arthropoda
- Clade: Pancrustacea
- Class: Insecta
- Order: Lepidoptera
- Family: Lycaenidae
- Genus: Icaricia
- Species: I. acmon

Binomial name
- Icaricia acmon (Westwood, [1851])

Synonyms
- Lycaena acmon Westwood, [1851]; Lycaena antaegon Boisduval, 1852; Rusticus acmon (Westwood, [1851]); Plebejus acmon (Westwood, [1851]); Aricia acmon (Westwood, [1851])

= Acmon blue =

Species of butterfly

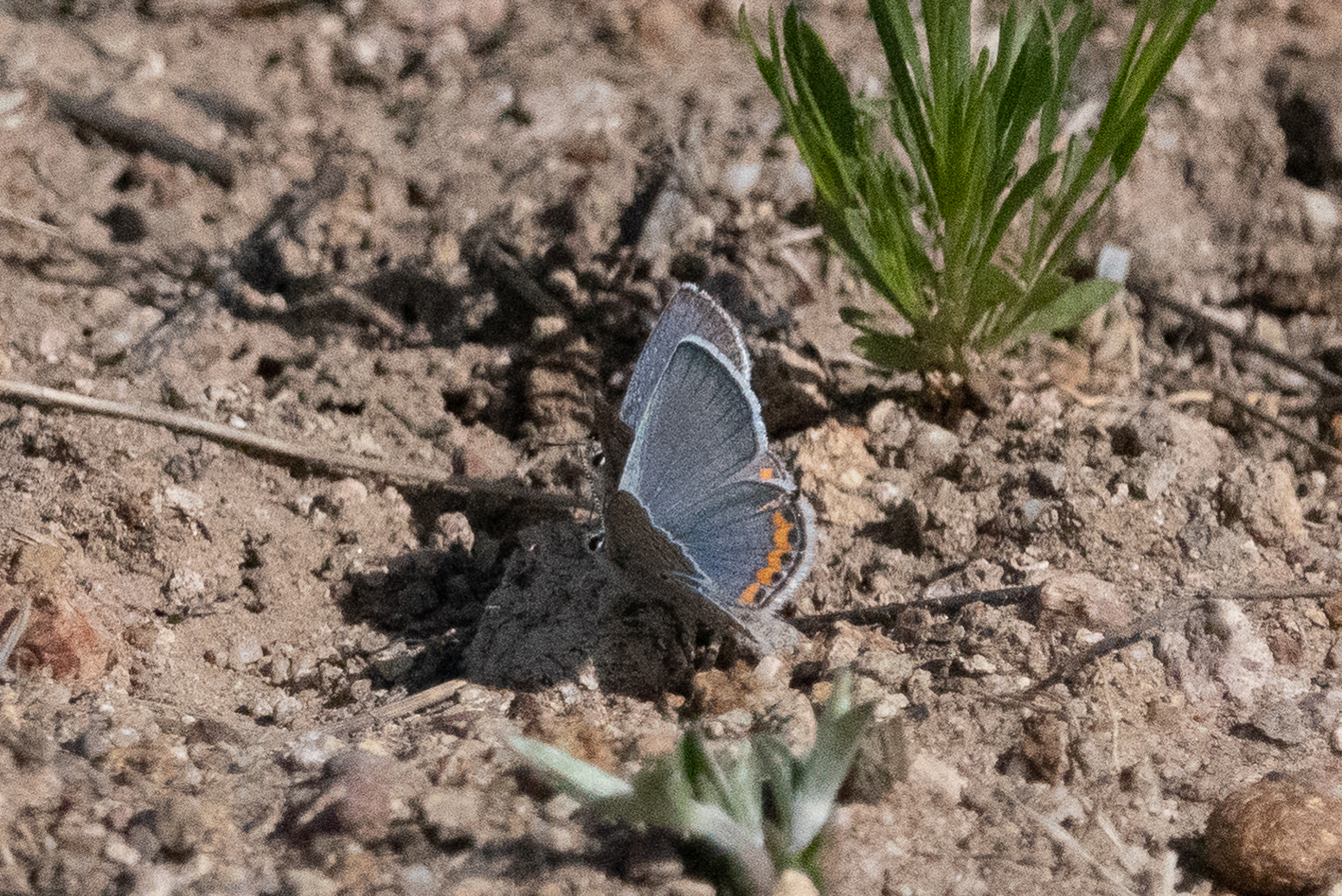
Acmon blue butterfly

Icaricia acmon, the Acmon blue, is a North American butterfly. It ranges mainly in California and Oregon but can also be seen in southwestern Canada and in the Great Plains Region of the United States, with a total range of about 2,500,000 square km. Because of the breadth of its range, it occurs in several different habitats, such as grasslands, fields, shrub lands, forests, and deserts. Acmon blue was discovered by Pierre Lorquin in 1850, while he visited California during the Gold Rush. It is believed that Acmon Blue was discovered in the San Francisco area.

Wingspan is between the range of 17-30 mm. The tops of the wings are blue with dark edges in males and brown in females. Its underside is white with black spots for both sexes and a red-orange band on the hindwing. Caterpillars are yellow with white hairs and a green stripe down the back. The Acmon is richly colored, more specifically the females with contrasting rows of red lunules (sometimes fused into a band). Meanwhile, the male's hindwing lunules tend to become pink and may disappear during autumn.

Like many other lycaenid butterflies, it has a mutualistic relationship with ants, who protect Acmon blue larvae in exchange for honeydew that the larvae secrete.

== Diet ==
Adults: Feed on nectar

Caterpillars: Feed on leaves, flowers, deerweed, buckwheats, lupines, trefoils, fruits of wild buckwheat, legumes such as trefoils, and milkvetches.

== Risk of Extinction ==
Not much is known about the predators of this species, but the Acmon blue is at risk due to global warming and decreased/changing precipitation levels caused by human development.
