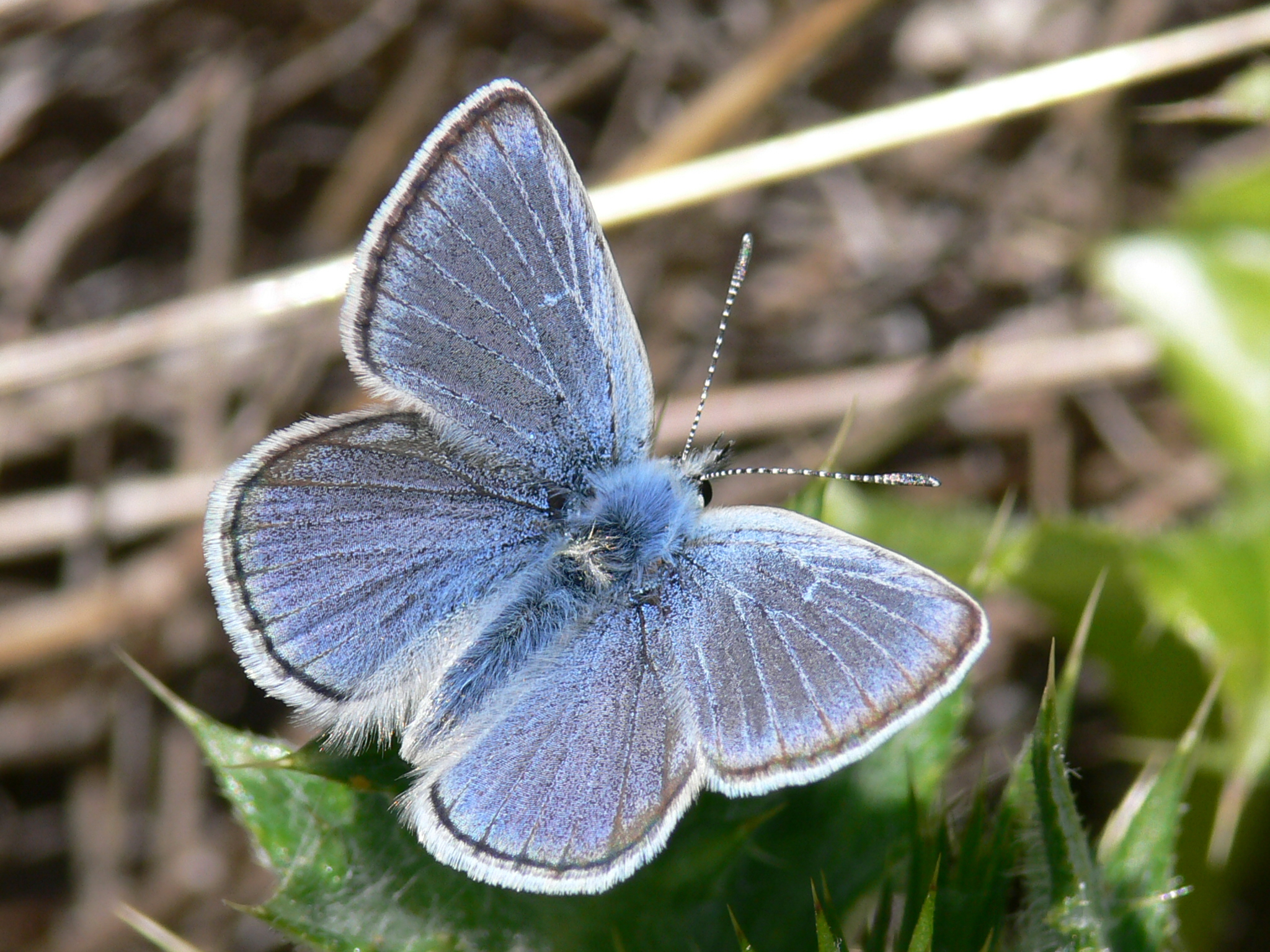
- Icaricia icarioides

Scientific classification
- Kingdom: Animalia
- Phylum: Arthropoda
- Clade: Pancrustacea
- Class: Insecta
- Order: Lepidoptera
- Family: Lycaenidae
- Subfamily: Polyommatinae
- Tribe: Polyommatini
- Genus: Icaricia; Nabokov, 1944

= Icaricia =

Butterfly genus in family Lycaenidae

Icaricia is a Nearctic genus of butterflies in the family Lycaenidae. It was first described by the author and lepidopterist Vladimir Nabokov in 1944.

== Species ==
Listed alphabetically:

- Icaricia acmon (Westwood, [1851])
- Icaricia cotundra (Scott & Fisher, 2006)
- Icaricia dedeckera J. Emmel, T. Emmel and Mattoon, 1998
- Icaricia icarioides (Boisduval, 1852)
- Icaricia lupini (Boisduval, 1869)
- Icaricia neurona (Skinner, 1902)
- Icaricia saepiolus (Boisduval, 1852)
- Icaricia shasta (Edwards, 1862)
