= Coast buckwheat =

Coast buckwheat may refer to different species in the family Polygonaceae:

- Eriogonum latifolium
- Eriogonum parvifolium
