= Callophrys viridis =

Conservation status
- Imperiled (NatureServe)

Scientific classification
- Domain: Eukaryota
- Kingdom: Animalia
- Phylum: Arthropoda
- Class: Insecta
- Order: Lepidoptera
- Family: Lycaenidae
- Genus: Callophrys
- Species: C. viridis

Binomial name
- Callophrys viridis Edwards, 1862

Species of butterfly

Callophrys viridis, the coastal green hairstreak, is a species of butterfly in the family Lycaenidae. It is endemic to California.

== Habitat ==
This butterfly can be found in coastal dunes, shrublands, and oak woodlands.

== Life cycle and behaviour ==
=== Eggs ===
The eggs are light green and are deposited singly on the leaves of the host plant.

=== Larvae ===
The Larvae are whitish with pink markings, but become a reddish colour shortly before pupating. They are known to feed on Eriogonum latifolium, Eriogonum nudum, and occasionally Lotus scoparius.

=== Pupae ===
The caterpillars pupate in leaf litter at the base of the host plant.

=== Adults ===
The adults are known to feed on nectar from Fragaria chiloensis, Armeria maritima, and Erigeron glaucus.

== Taxonomy ==
In 1998, due to a disagreement over the identity of the lectotype for the species Callophrys dumetorum, the names of both C. dumetorum and C. viridis were changed to C. perplexa and C. dumetorum respectively. In 2012, ICZN Opinion 2291 designated a neotype for C. dumetorum and reverted the name changes for both species. As such, the valid name for the coastal green hairstreak is Callophrys viridis, however many sources from 1998 to 2012 use the name Callophrys dumetorum instead.
