= Cliff buckwheat =

Cliff buckwheat is a common name for several plants and may refer to:

- Eriogonum parvifolium
- Eriogonum scopulorum
