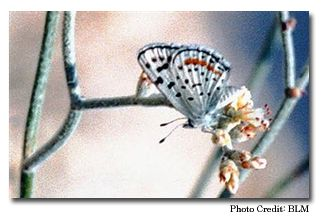
- Euphilotes pallescens arenamontana

Scientific classification
- Domain: Eukaryota
- Kingdom: Animalia
- Phylum: Arthropoda
- Class: Insecta
- Order: Lepidoptera
- Family: Lycaenidae
- Genus: Euphilotes
- Species: E. pallescens

Binomial name
- Euphilotes pallescens (Tilden & Downey, 1955)

Synonyms
- Philotes pallescens Tilden & Downey, 1955; Euphilotes rita pallescens

= Euphilotes pallescens =

Species of butterfly

Euphilotes pallescens, the pale blue, pallid blue or pallid dotted blue, is a species of butterfly of the family Lycaenidae. It is found in the United States in southeastern California, Nevada, southern Utah and northern Arizona.

The wingspan is 16–21 mm. Adults are on wing from July to September in one generation per year. They feed on the flower nectar of Eriogonum species.

The larvae feed on the flowers and fruits of Eriogonum species, including E. kearneyi, E. microthecum and E. plumatella. The larvae are tended by ants.

== Subspecies ==
- Euphilotes pallescens pallescens
- Euphilotes pallescens arenamontana Austin, 1998 Sand Mountain blue
- Euphilotes pallescens elvirae (Mattoni, 1966)
