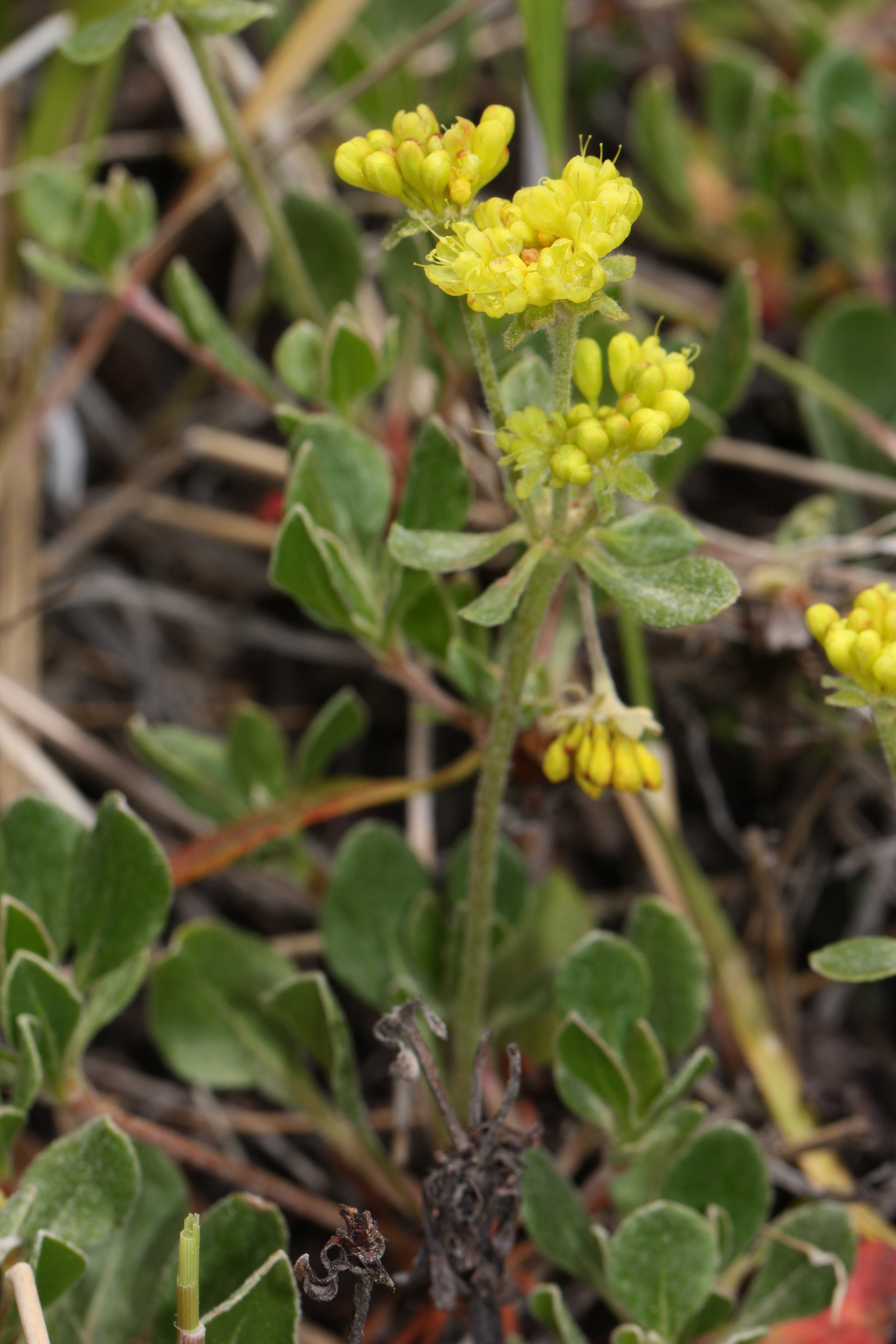
- Eriogonum umbellatum var. hypoleium

Conservation status
- Secure (NatureServe)

Scientific classification
- Kingdom: Plantae
- Clade: Tracheophytes
- Clade: Angiosperms
- Clade: Eudicots
- Order: Caryophyllales
- Family: Polygonaceae
- Genus: Eriogonum
- Species: E. umbellatum

Binomial name
- Eriogonum umbellatum Torr.

= Eriogonum umbellatum =

Species of wild buckwheat

Eriogonum umbellatum is a species of wild buckwheat known by the common name sulphurflower buckwheat, or simply sulphur flower.

== Description ==
It is an extremely variable plant and hard to identify because individuals can look very different from one another. It may be a perennial herb blooming by summer with stems 10 centimetres (4 in) tall and two to six clusters of flowers, with a whorl of leaves below the stems, or a sprawling shrub approaching 2 metres (6 1/2 ft) high and wide. The leaves are usually woolly and low on the plant, and the flowers come in many colors from white to bright yellow to purple.

== Taxonomy ==
The first scientific description of Eriogonum umbellatum was published in 1827 by John Torrey. He placed it in the Eriogonum genus which is classified in the Polygonaceae family.

=== Varieties ===
The species has a large number of accepted infraspecifics, over 41 varieties according to Plants of the World Online. Variety majus continues to be treated as a species named Eriogonum subalpinum by some botanical sources. Selected varieties:

- E. u. var. argus - often nearly hairless leaves and bright yellow flowers; limited to the Klamath Mountains
- E. u. var. dichrocephalum - found throughout much of the western United States
- E. u. var. furcosum - a low shrub native to the Sierra Nevada
- E. u. var. glaberrimum - (green buckwheat) - a nearly hairless, white-flowered species
- E. u. var. humistratum - (Mt. Eddy buckwheat) - a rare northern California endemic
- E. u. var. juniporinum - (juniper buckwheat) - an uncommon plant of eastern California and western Nevada
- E. u. var. subalpinum - (sulfur buckwheat) - similar to Eriogonum eriogonum but has wider and more spoon-shaped leaves
- E. u. var. subaridum - (sulfur buckwheat) - similar to Eriogonum nevadense, found in California, Nevada, Utah and Arizona. Common in Zion National Park where it tends to be shrubby with glabrous leaves at times.
- E. u. var. torreyanum - (Donner Pass buckwheat) - known from fewer than 10 occurrences near the Donner Pass
- E. u. var. versicolor - bears pinkish-brown flowers with bright stripes

=== Names ===
The scientific name, umbellatum, means "having an umbel" in Botanical Latin, a reference to the umbrella shape of the inflorescence.

== Distribution and habitat ==
It is native to western North America from California to Colorado to central Canada, where it is abundant and found in many habitats, including the sagebrush steppe and alpine areas.

== Ecology ==
It is a popular larval host, feeding the bramble hairstreak, desert green hairstreak, lupine blue, Mormon metalmark, Rocky Mountain dotted blue, Sheridan's hairstreak, Sonoran metalmark, and western green hairstreak. Additionally, goats and domestic sheep feed on the plant.

== Cultivation ==
The wildflower gardening author Claude A. Barr complemented sulphurflower buckwheat as a "treasure in appearance and in adaptation in my garden." It is valued for its very low water usage for xeriscaping. The cultivar "Kannah Creek", a selection of Eriogonum umbellatum var. aureum, has been introduced to the garden trade by the Plant Select cooperative sponsored by Colorado State University and Denver Botanic Gardens. It grows in USDA zones 4–8.

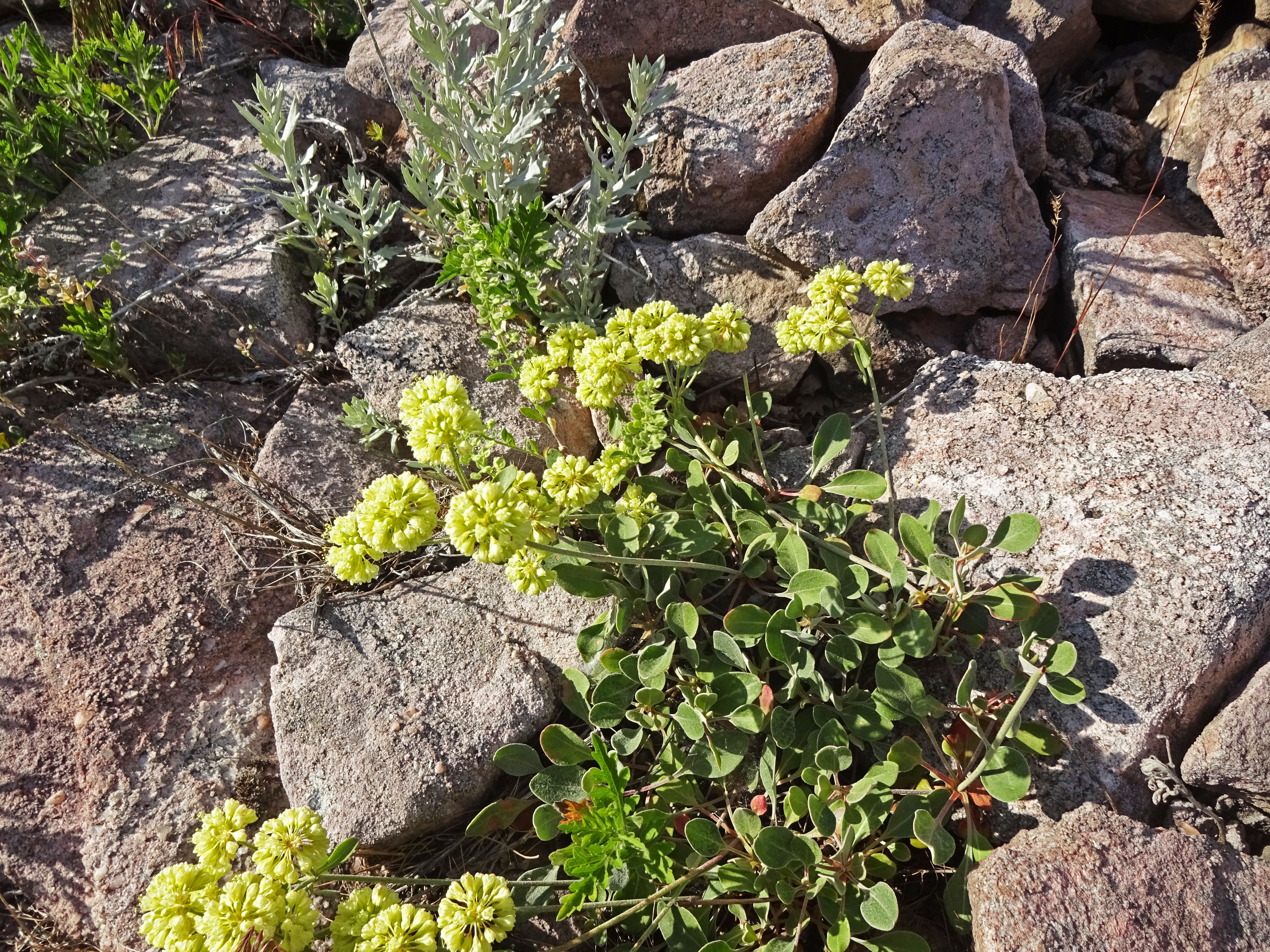
E. umbellatum var. dichrocephalum

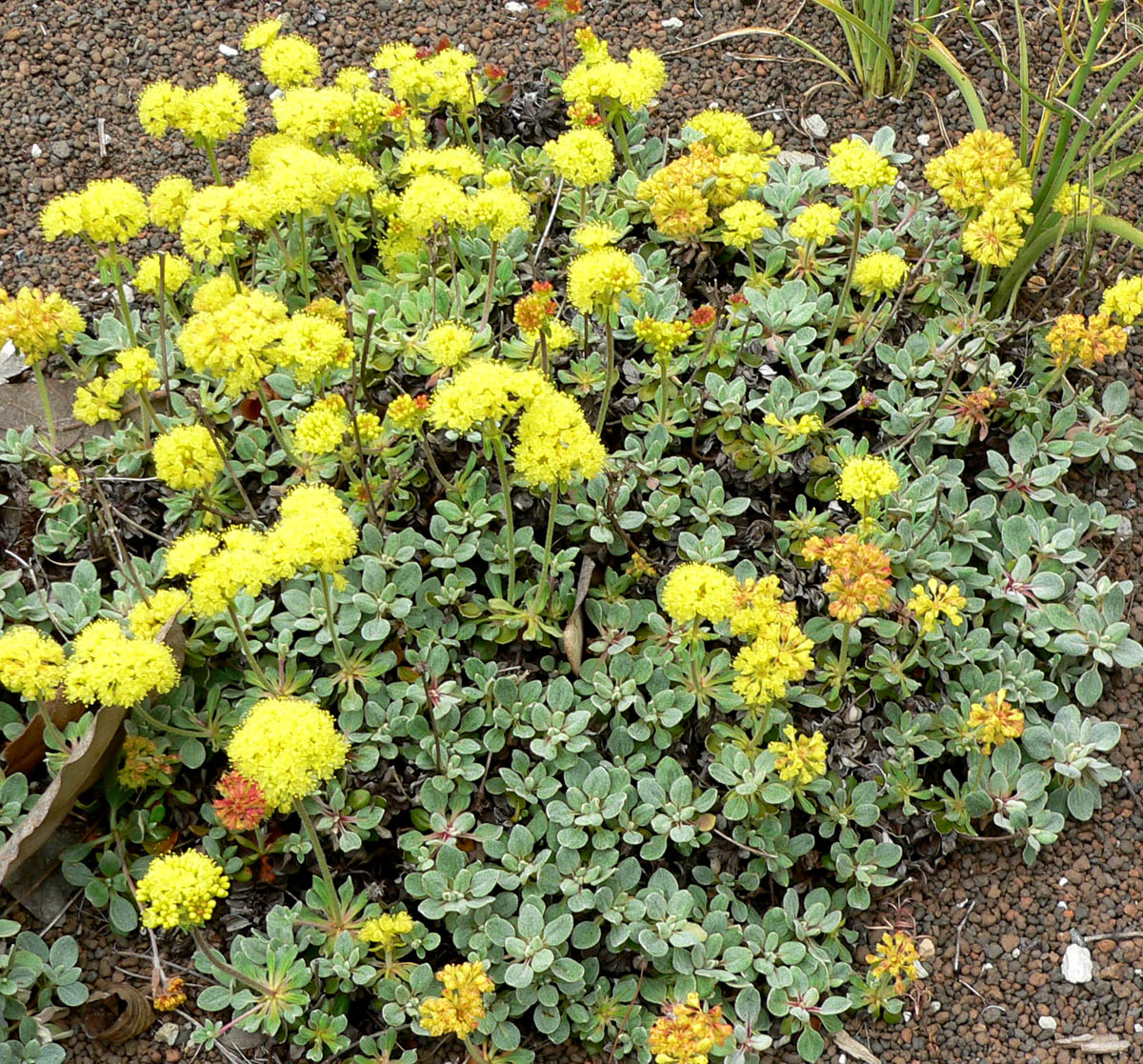
E. umbellatum var. humistratum (habit)

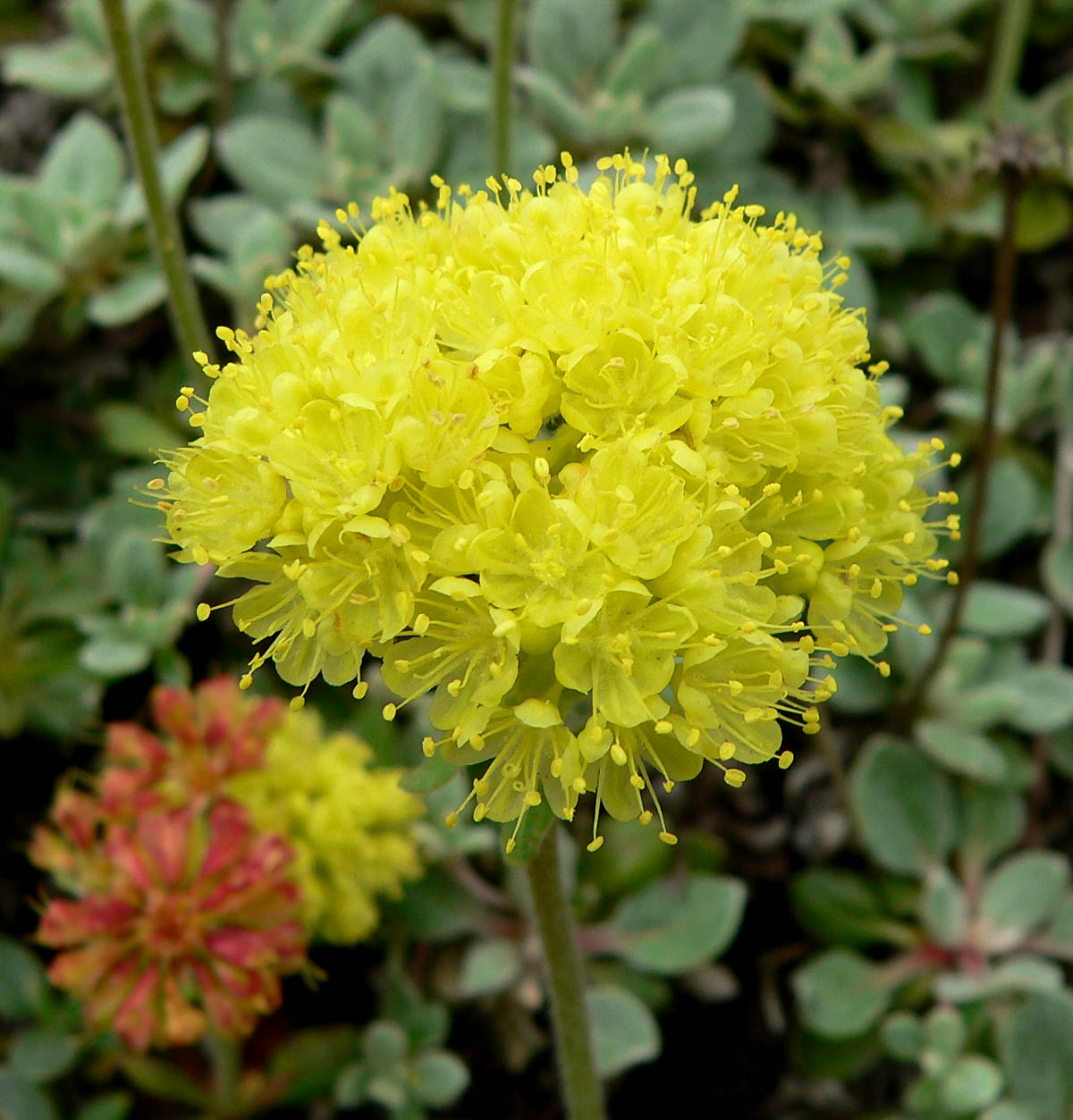
E. umbellatum var. humistratum (flowers)

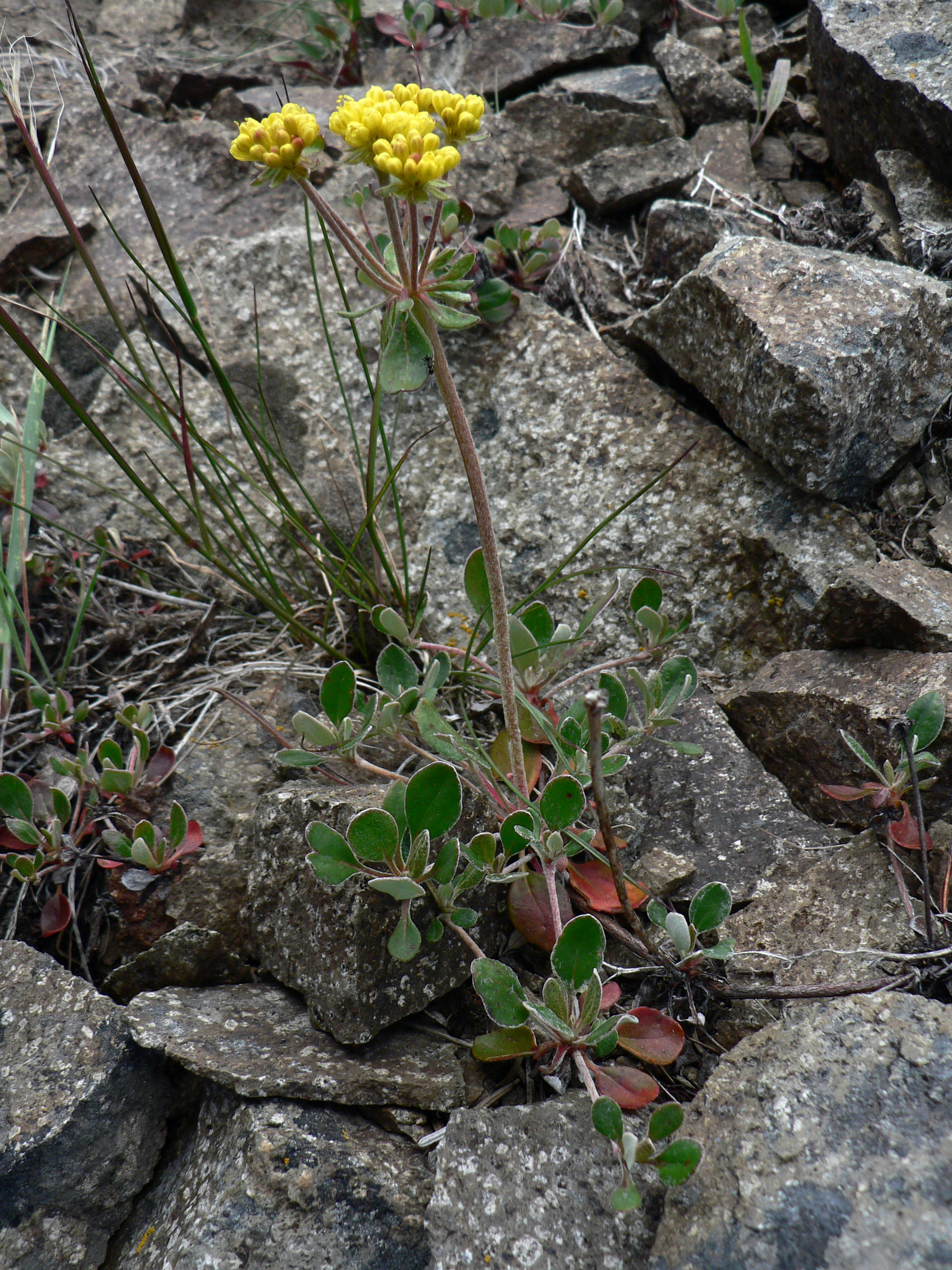
E. umbellatum var. hypoleium (habit, William O. Douglas Wilderness)

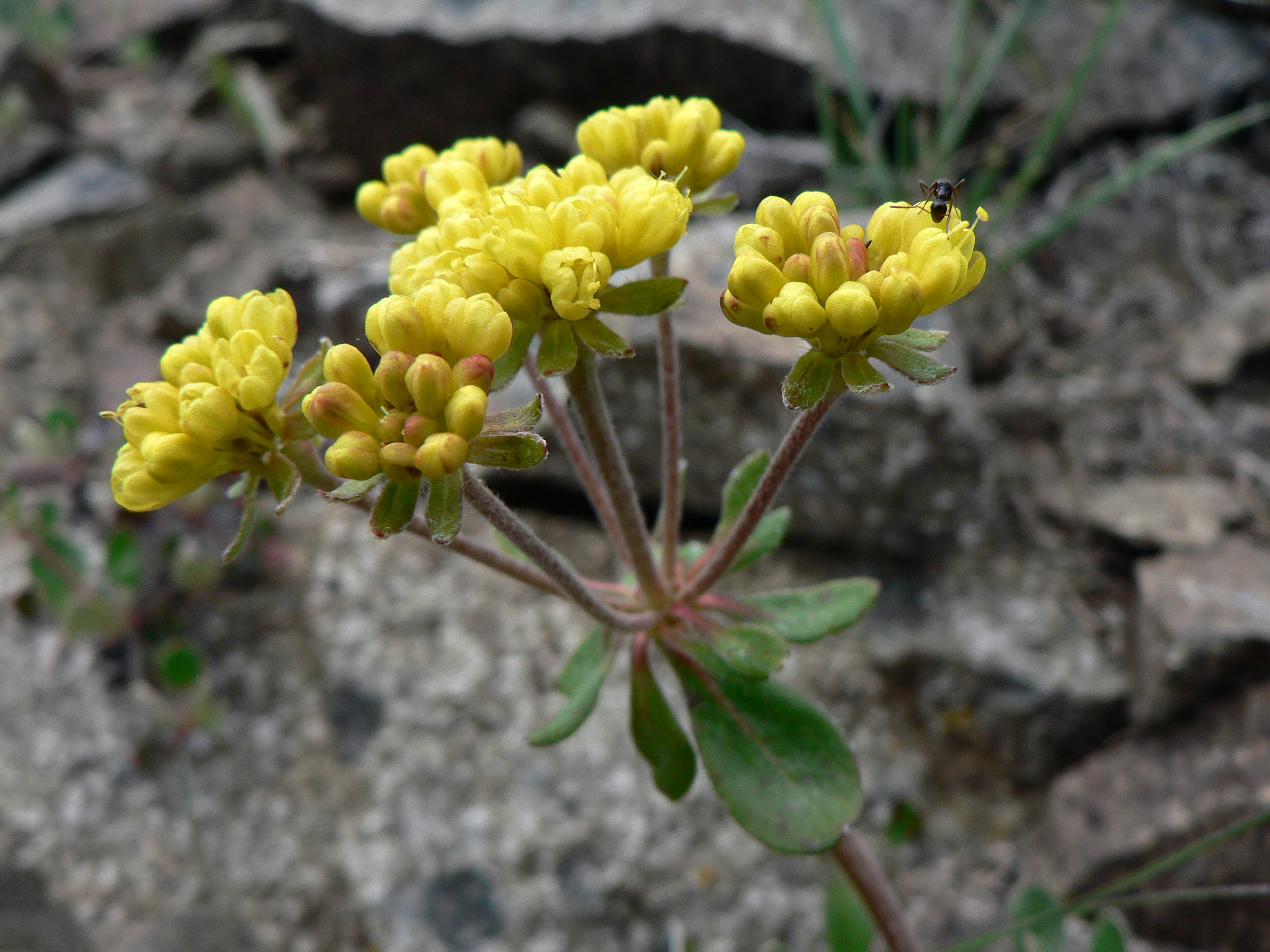
E. umbellatum var. hypoleium (flowers)

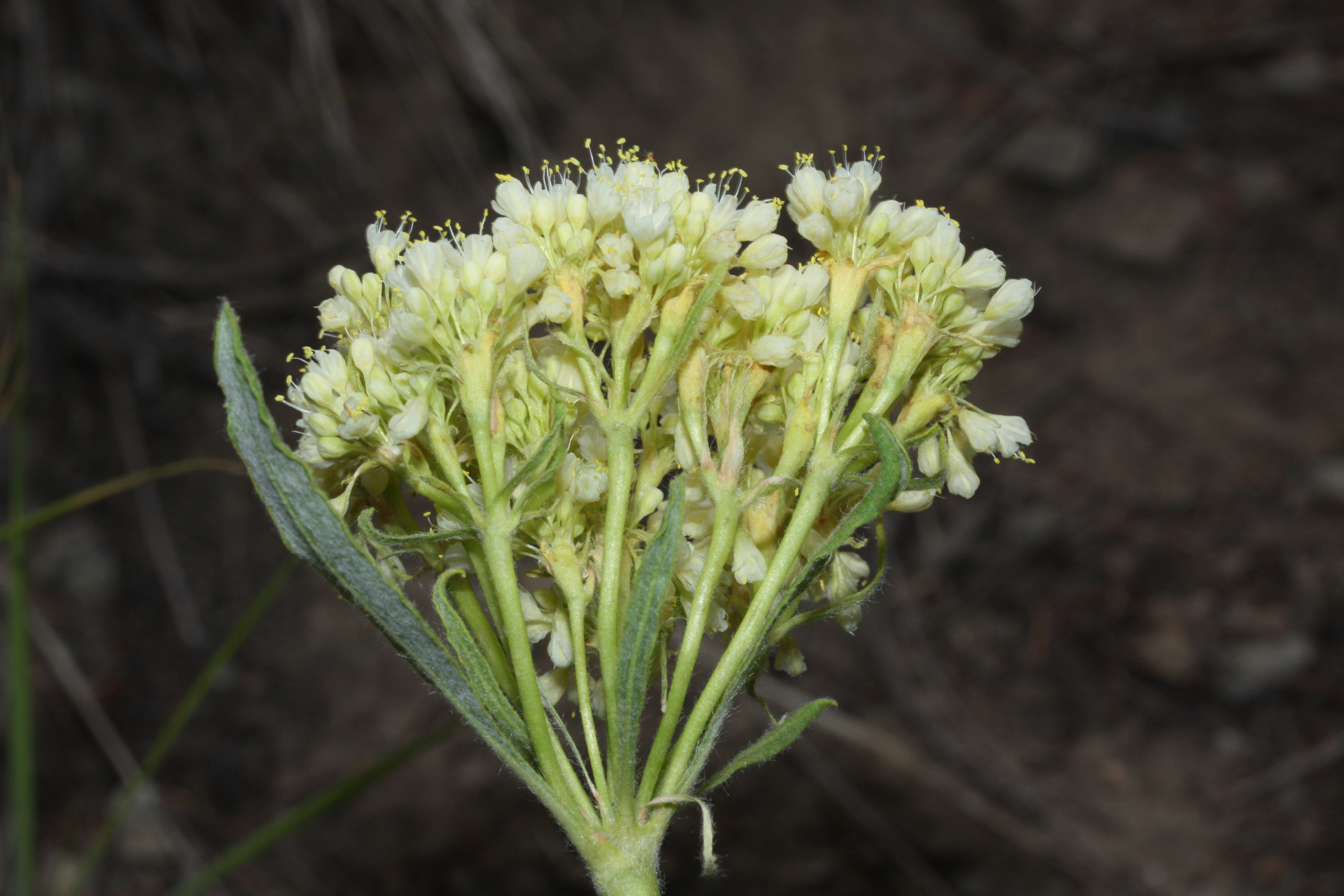
E. umbellatum var. majus (flowers, Wenatchee Mountains)

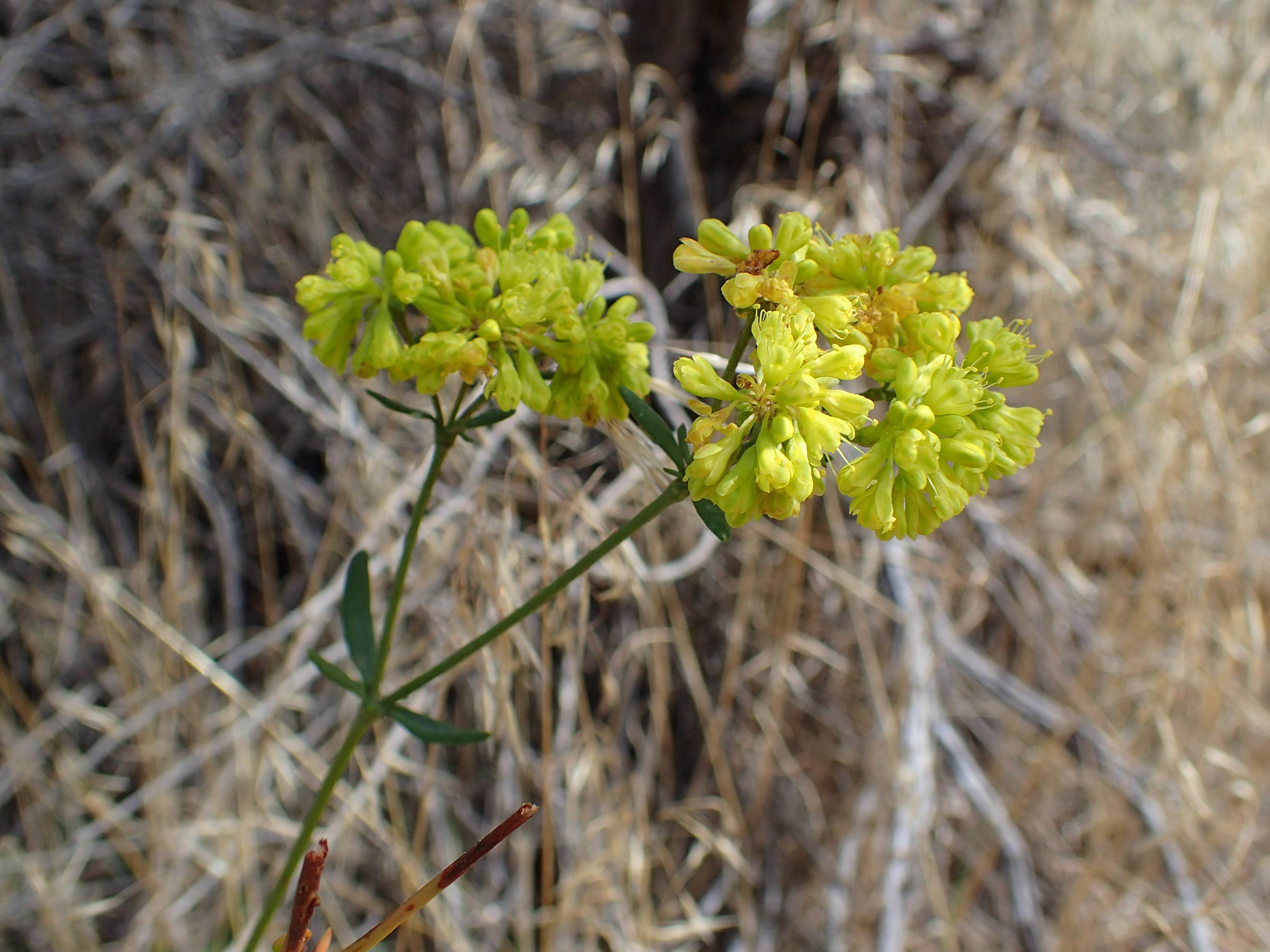
E. umbellatum var. subaridum (flowers, Zion National Park)
