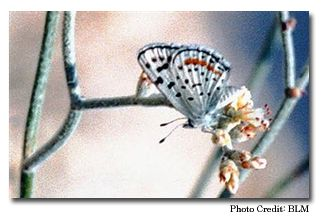
- Euphilotes pallescens arenamontana

Conservation status
- Critically Imperiled (NatureServe)

Scientific classification
- Kingdom: Animalia
- Phylum: Arthropoda
- Clade: Pancrustacea
- Class: Insecta
- Order: Lepidoptera
- Family: Lycaenidae
- Genus: Euphilotes
- Species: E. pallescens
- Subspecies: E. p. arenamontana

Trinomial name
- Euphilotes pallescens arenamontana Austin, 1998

= Sand Mountain blue =

Subspecies of butterfly

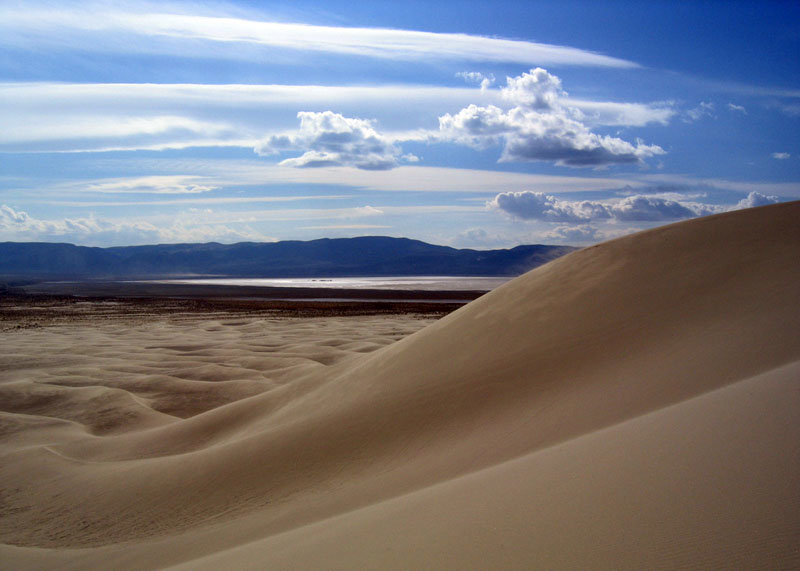
Sand Mountain Recreation Area

The Sand Mountain blue (Euphilotes pallescens arenamontana) is a lycaenid butterfly of the "blue" subfamily that is only found around the Sand Mountain Recreation Area near Fallon, Nevada. It is a subspecies of the pallid blue (Euphilotes pallescens).

== Biological characteristics ==
These butterflies are known for their almost complete dependence upon Kearney buckwheat; eating the fallen leaves of the plant as larvae, and drinking the nectar of the flowers as adults - however, the adults occasionally feed on other plant species. Like many gossamer-winged butterflies, Sand Mountain blues have a close relationship with ants; in this case, desert carpenter ants feed on a sugary secretion of the larvae; whether the larvae also benefit or not is yet to be determined. Once the larvae metamorphose into the pupal stage, rather than remaining fixed to buckwheat plant, the chrysalis drops into the leaf litter at the base. Upon reaching adulthood, E. pallescens arenamontana typically measure anywhere between 10.0 mm (0.39 in) and 11.9 mm (0.47 in). The subspecies is not known to migrate, and stays within 200 ft (61 m) of its host plant. The lifespan of an adult Sand Mountain blue is approximately one week.

== Status ==
The species to which the Sand Mountain blue belongs, Euphilotes pallescens, has been officially classified as vulnerable, while the subspecies E. p. arenamontana itself has been labeled as critically imperiled, at great risk of extinction. In 2004 a petition was filed to investigate the status of the Sand Mountain blue and whether it should be placed on the endangered or threatened species lists. Currently Sand Mountain blues are referred to as "rare" because of their small geographical distribution around the Sand Mountain dune. In March 2007, several off-road vehicle trails were closed off in order to protect the subspecies and its host plant from intrusion.
