= Euphilotes centralis =

Scientific classification
- Domain: Eukaryota
- Kingdom: Animalia
- Phylum: Arthropoda
- Class: Insecta
- Order: Lepidoptera
- Family: Lycaenidae
- Genus: Euphilotes
- Species: E. centralis

Binomial name
- Euphilotes centralis (Barnes & McDunnough, 1917)

Species of butterfly

Euphilotes centralis, the central blue, is a butterfly in the family Lycaenidae. It was first described by William Barnes and James Halliday McDunnough in 1917. It is found in North America.

The MONA or Hodges number for Euphilotes centralis is 4366.2.

== Subspecies ==
Two subspecies belong to Euphilotes centralis:

- Euphilotes centralis centralis (Barnes & McDunnough, 1917)^{i}
- Euphilotes centralis hadrochilus Pratt & J. Emmel in T. Emmel, 1998^{i}

Data sources: i = ITIS, c = Catalogue of Life, g = GBIF, b = BugGuide
