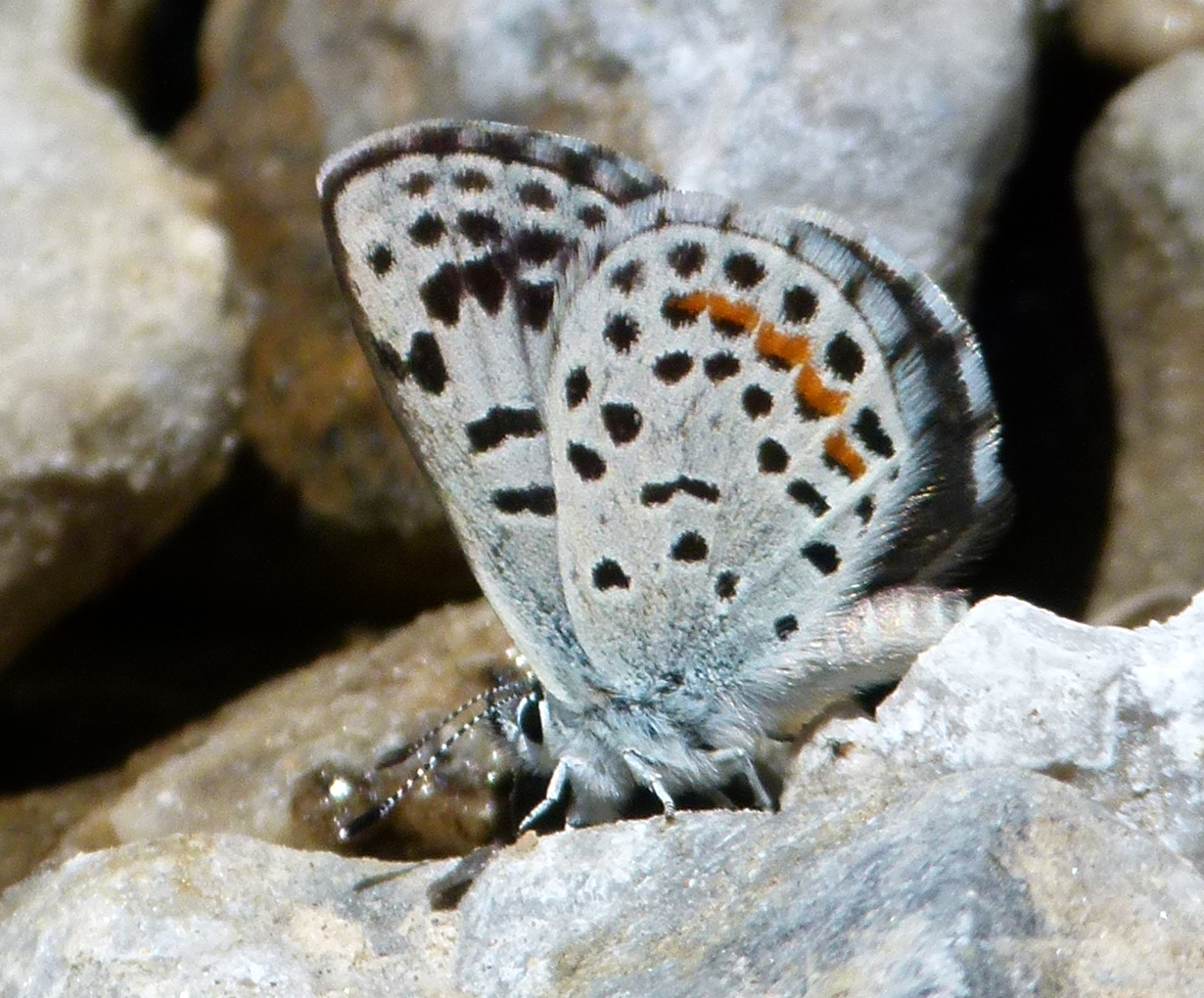

Scientific classification
- Domain: Eukaryota
- Kingdom: Animalia
- Phylum: Arthropoda
- Class: Insecta
- Order: Lepidoptera
- Family: Lycaenidae
- Genus: Euphilotes
- Species: E. ancilla

Binomial name
- Euphilotes ancilla (Barnes & McDunnough, 1918)

Synonyms
- Philotes ancilla Barnes & McDunnough, 1918

= Euphilotes ancilla =

Rocky Mountain dotted blue

Species of butterfly

Euphilotes ancilla, the Rocky Mountain dotted blue, is a species of butterfly of the family Lycaenidae. It is found from Washington south to California and southern Alberta and Saskatchewan south through the Rockies and high plains to Wyoming, Colorado, Utah, and northwestern New Mexico. The species was first described by William Barnes and James Halliday McDunnough in 1918.

Its wingspan is from 17 to 23 mm. Its habitats include sun-exposed rocky slopes and flats with host plant colonies.

Larvae feed on various Eriogonum species, especially sulphur-flower (Eriogonum umbellatum).
