= Sand Springs Station =

- U.S. National Register of Historic Places
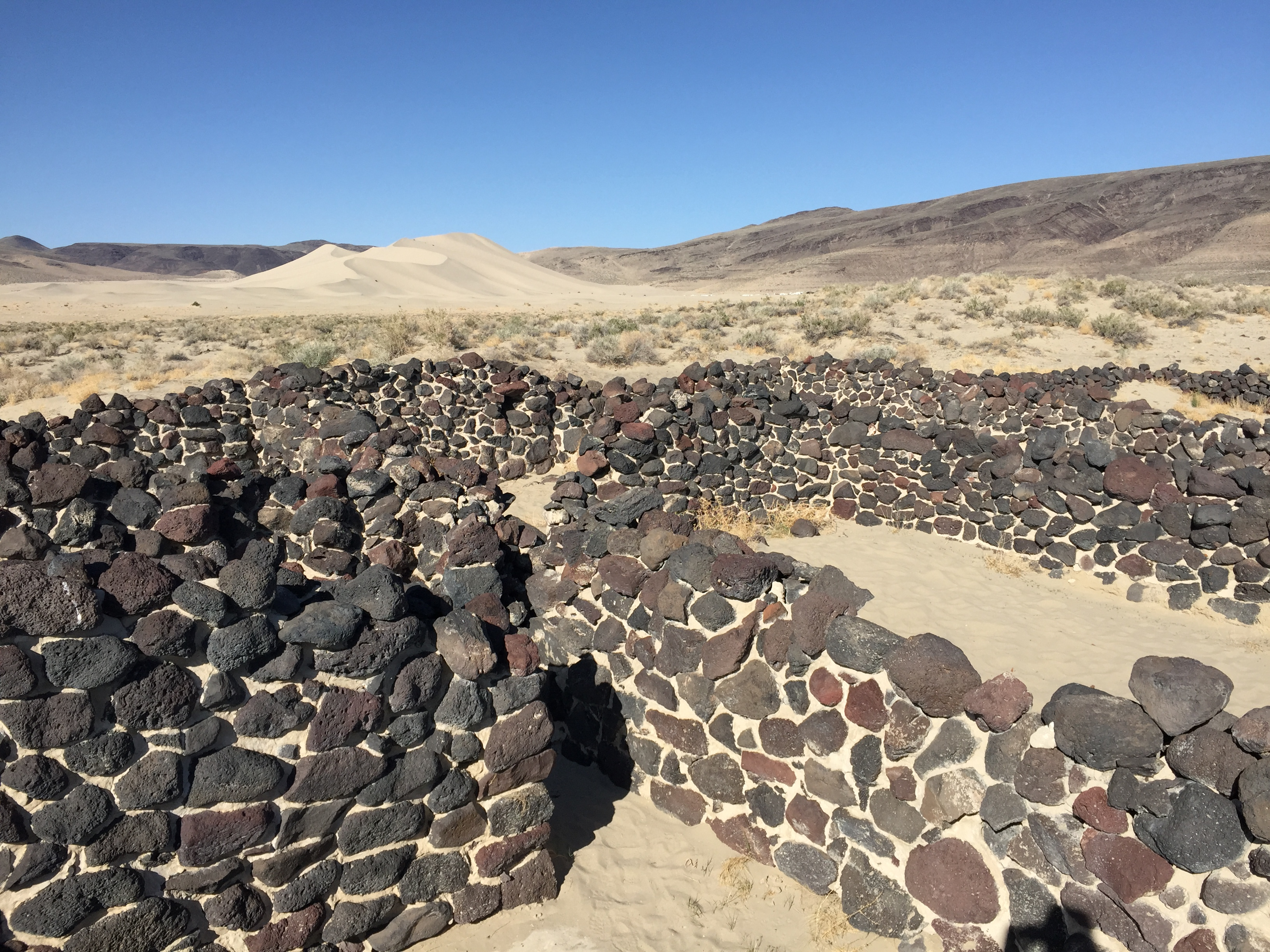
- Ruins of the Sand Springs Station, with Sand Mountain visible in the background
- Nearest city: Fallon, Nevada
- Area: less than one acre
- Built: 1859
- NRHP reference No.: 80002465
- Added to NRHP: November 21, 1980

The Sand Springs Station is a historic site in Churchill County, Nevada that was listed on the National Register of Historic Places in 1980. A Pony Express station existed there in 1860. The ruins are located within the boundaries of the Sand Mountain Recreation Area.

The station was named for a sand-filled summit from which a spring emanated.
