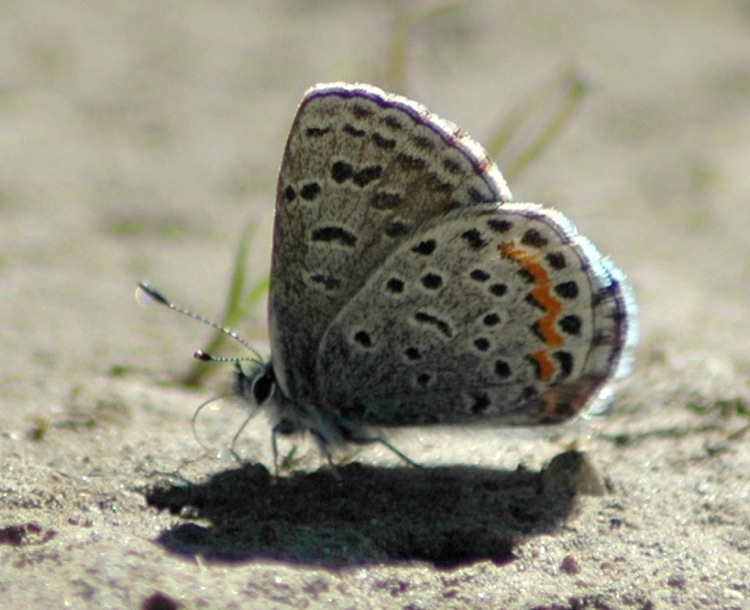

Scientific classification
- Kingdom: Animalia
- Phylum: Arthropoda
- Clade: Pancrustacea
- Class: Insecta
- Order: Lepidoptera
- Family: Lycaenidae
- Genus: Euphilotes
- Species: E. enoptes

Binomial name
- Euphilotes enoptes (Boisduval, 1852)

= Euphilotes enoptes =

Species of butterfly

Euphilotes enoptes, the dotted blue, is a species of blue (Polyommatinae) butterfly in the family Lycaenidae. It is found in North America.

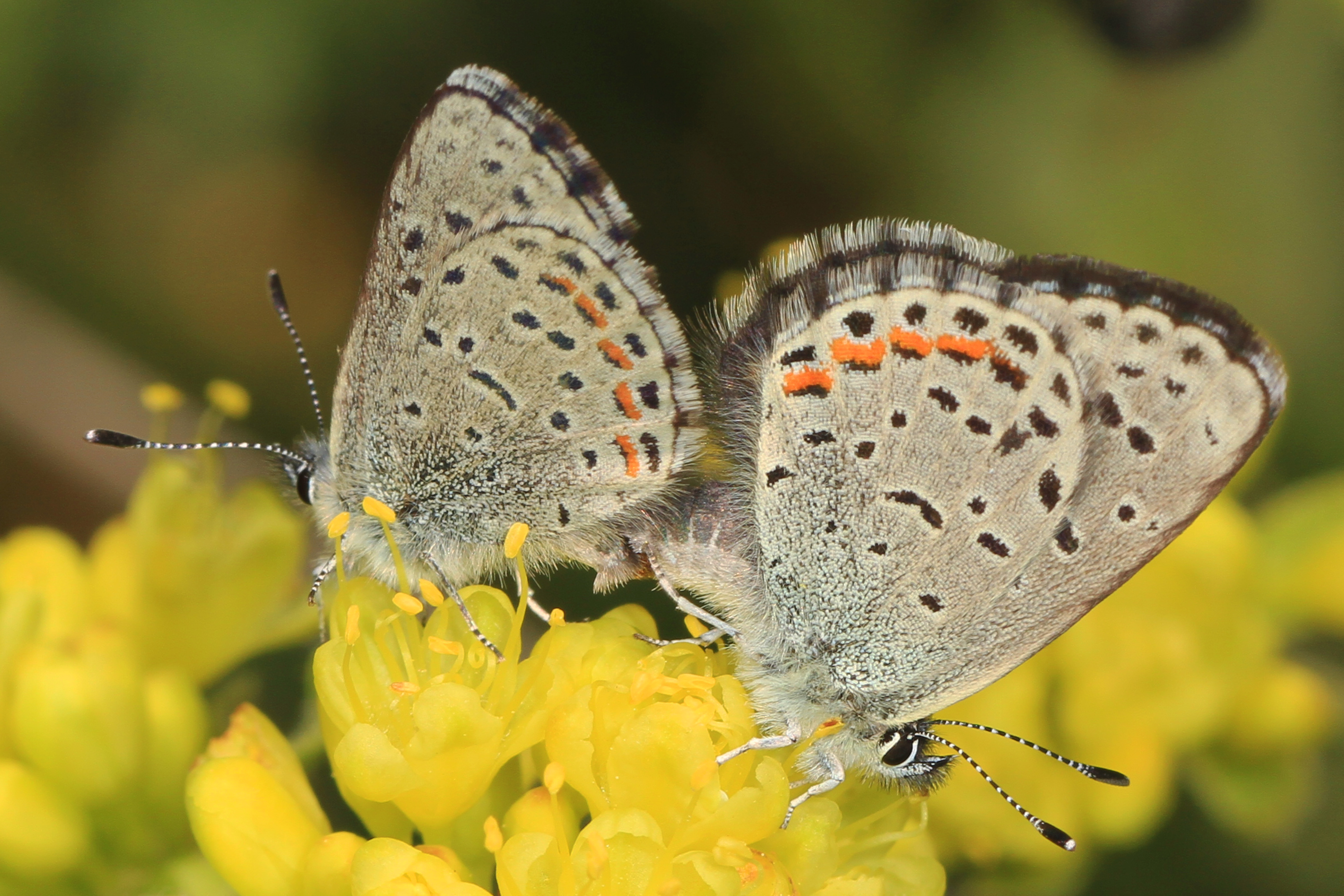

== Subspecies ==
- Euphilotes enoptes arenacola Pratt and J. Emmel in T. Emmel, 1998
- Euphilotes enoptes aridorum Austin in T. Emmel, 1998
- Euphilotes enoptes bayensis (Langston, 1964)
- Euphilotes enoptes cryptorufes Pratt and J. Emmel in T. Emmel, 1998
- Euphilotes enoptes dammersi (J. A. Comstock and Henne, 1933)
- Euphilotes enoptes enoptes (Boisduval, 1852) (Pacific dotted-blue)
- Euphilotes enoptes langstoni (Shields, 1975)
- Euphilotes enoptes opacapulla Austin in T. Emmel, 1998
- Euphilotes enoptes primavera Austin in T. Emmel, 1998
- Euphilotes enoptes smithi (Mattoni, 1954)
- Euphilotes enoptes tildeni (Langston, 1964)
