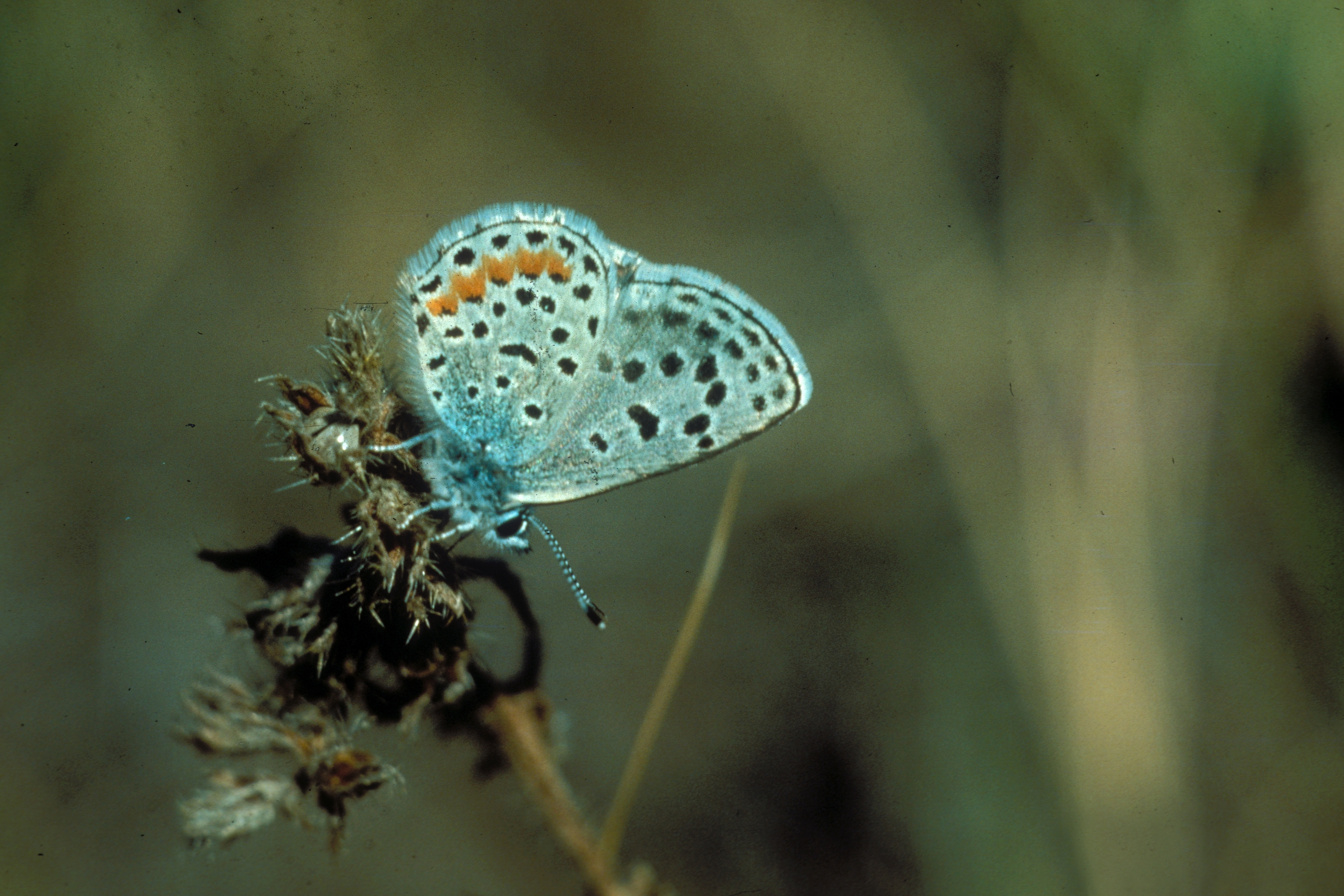

Conservation status
- Vulnerable (NatureServe)

Scientific classification
- Domain: Eukaryota
- Kingdom: Animalia
- Phylum: Arthropoda
- Class: Insecta
- Order: Lepidoptera
- Family: Lycaenidae
- Genus: Euphilotes
- Species: E. rita

Binomial name
- Euphilotes rita (Barnes & McDunnough, 1916)

Synonyms
- Lycaena rita Barnes & McDunnough, 1916

= Euphilotes rita =

Species of butterfly

Euphilotes rita, the rita blue or desert buckwheat blue, is a species of butterfly of the family Lycaenidae. It is found in Wyoming, Colorado, Arizona, New Mexico and northern Mexico. The species was first described by William Barnes and James Halliday McDunnough in 1916.

The wingspan is 17–22 mm. Adults are on wing from July to late September in one generation per year. They feed on the flower nectar of Eriogonum species. Its habitats include juniper-pinyon woodlands, sand dunes, oak woodland, and prairie grasslands.

The larvae feed on the flowers and fruits of wild Eriogonum species, including Eriogonum effusum, Eriogonum flavum, Eriogonum leptocladon, Eriogonum racemosum and Eriogonum wrightii. The larvae are tended by ants. Adults feed on nectar from host plants and seep-willow.

== Subspecies ==
- Euphilotes rita rita
- Euphilotes rita coloradensis (Mattoni, 1966)
- Euphilotes rita mattoni (Shields, 1975)
- Euphilotes rita emmeli (Shields, 1975)
