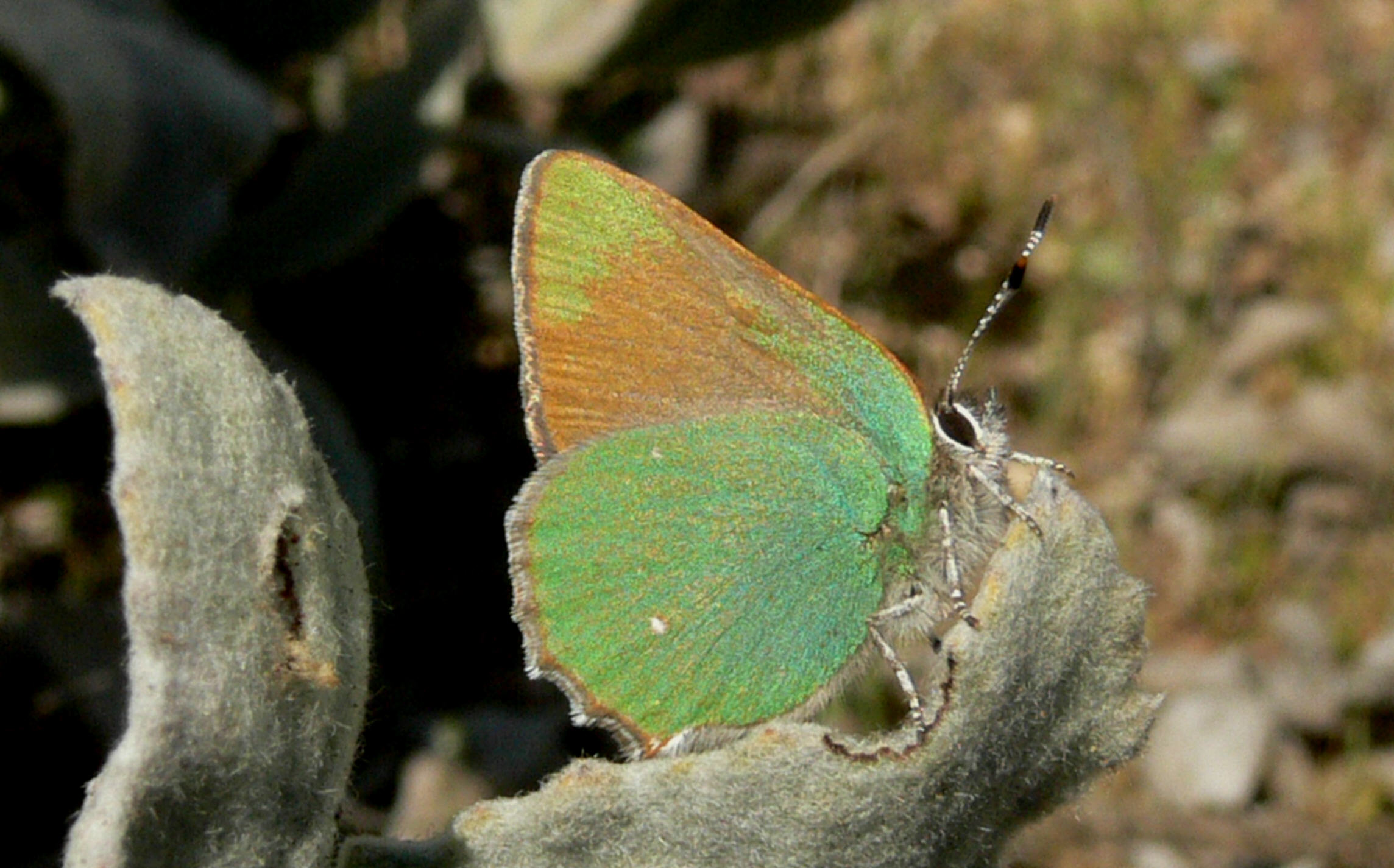

Scientific classification
- Domain: Eukaryota
- Kingdom: Animalia
- Phylum: Arthropoda
- Class: Insecta
- Order: Lepidoptera
- Family: Lycaenidae
- Genus: Callophrys
- Species: C. dumetorum

Binomial name
- Callophrys dumetorum (Boisduval, 1852)

Synonyms
- Thecla dumetorum Boisduval, 1852; Callophrys perplexa; Callophrys perplexa oregonensis

= Callophrys dumetorum =

Species of butterfly

Callophrys dumetorum, the bramble hairstreak or lotus hairstreak, is a butterfly of the family Lycaenidae. It is found in the United States in coastal California and rarely in inland California. Subspecies C. d. oregonensis is known as the Oregon green hairstreak.

== Description ==
Callophrys dumetorum has a wingspan is 25–32 mm. The wings are light brown dorsally, and vivid green ventrally, with a broken white postmedial line. On the forewing, the green is typically limited to the leading 1/3rd of the wing.

== Habitat ==
These butterflies can be found in heathlands, road-cuts, coastal dunes, and open sites and clearings in Douglas-fir and ponderosa pine forests.

== Life cycle and behaviour ==
The larvae have been recorded on broad-leafed lotus and Acmispon nevadensis

Adults feed on nectar from these plants, as well as from desert parsley, dogbane, yerba santa, California buckeye, and woolly sunflower.

== Taxonomy ==
In 1998 Emmet et al. identified the lectotype for C. dumetorum as the Coastal Green Hairstreak (Callophrys viridis). This disagreement over the identity of the lectotype of C. dumetorum led to confusion between C. dumetorum, C. sheridanii, and C. viridis. The binomial name C. dumetorum was replaced with C. perplexa as a result of this change, while C. viridis was changed to C. dumetorum.

In 2012, ICZN Opinion 2291 designated a neotype for C. dumetorum and reverted the above changes.

=== Subspecies ===
- Callophrys dumetorum dumetorum
- Callophrys dumetorum oregonensis Gorelick, [1970] (Washington, Oregon)
