= Euphilotes mojave =

Scientific classification
- Kingdom: Animalia
- Phylum: Arthropoda
- Clade: Pancrustacea
- Class: Insecta
- Order: Lepidoptera
- Family: Lycaenidae
- Genus: Euphilotes
- Species: E. mojave

Binomial name
- Euphilotes mojave (F. Watson & W. Comstock, 1920)

Species of butterfly

Euphilotes mojave, known generally as the Mojave dotted blue or Mojave blue, is a species of blue in the butterfly family Lycaenidae. It is found in North America.

== Subspecies ==
These two subspecies belong to the species Euphilotes mojave:

- Euphilotes mojave mojave (F. Watson & W. Comstock, 1920)
- Euphilotes mojave virginensis Austin in T. Emmel, 1998
