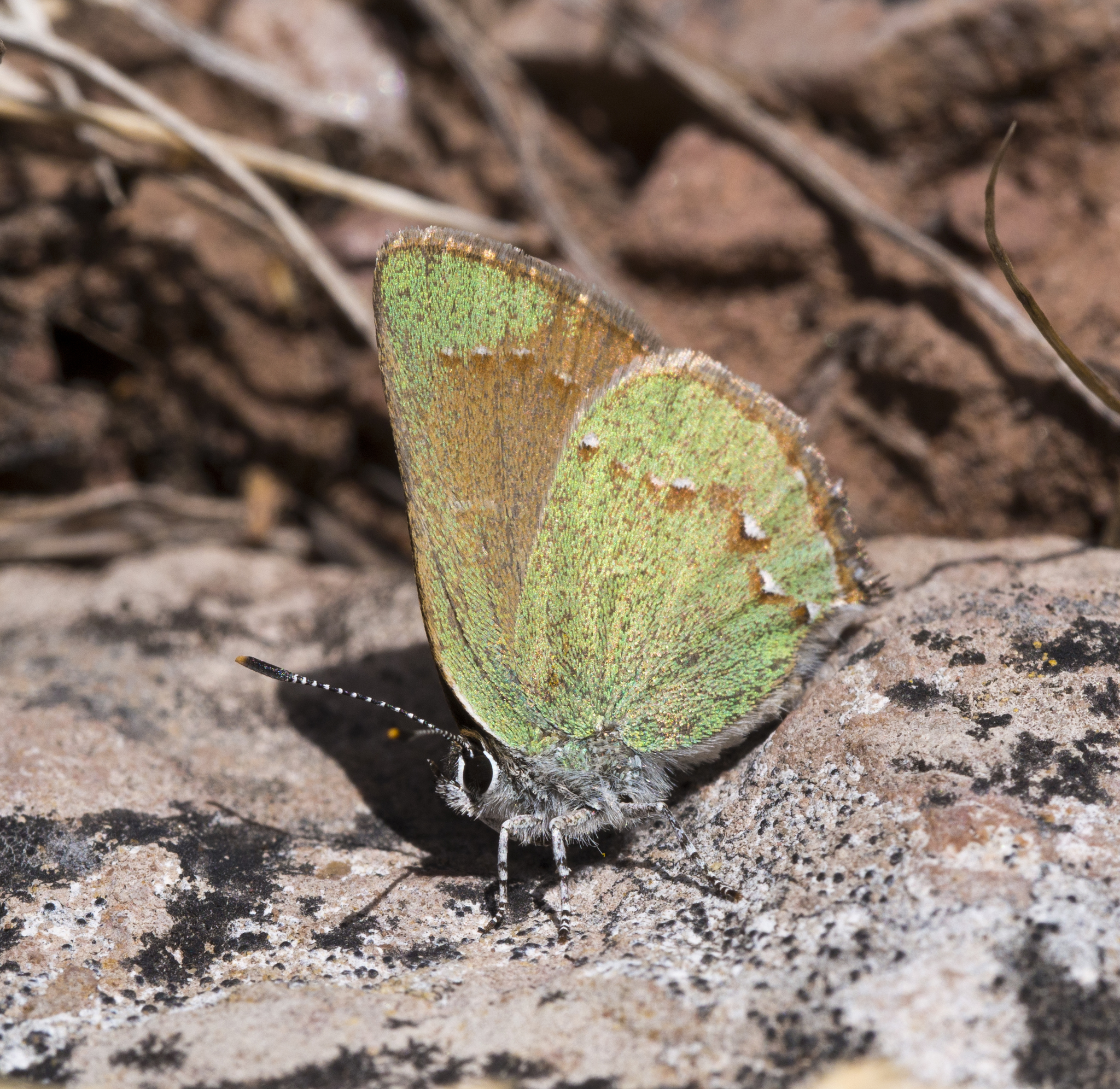
- C. a. apama

Scientific classification
- Domain: Eukaryota
- Kingdom: Animalia
- Phylum: Arthropoda
- Class: Insecta
- Order: Lepidoptera
- Family: Lycaenidae
- Genus: Callophrys
- Species: C. augustinus

Binomial name
- Callophrys augustinus (W.H. Edwards, 1862)

Synonyms
- Thecla affinis Edwards, 1862; Thecla apama Edwards, 1882; Callophrys apama r. homoperplexa Barnes & Benjamin, 1923

= Callophrys affinis =

Western green hairstreak

Species of butterfly

Callophrys affinis, the western green hairstreak or immaculate green hairstreak, is a butterfly of the family Lycaenidae. It is found in western Canada and the western United States.

The wingspan is 20 to 28 mm. Adults are on the wing from early March to mid-June in one generation.

The larvae feed on Eriogonum umbellatum.

== Subspecies ==
Listed alphabetically:

- C. a. affinis
- C. a. albipalpis Gorelick, 2005 (New Mexico)
- C. a. apama Edwards, 1882 – Arizona canyon green hairstreak (Arizona)
- C. a. homoperplexa Barnes & Benjamin, 1923 (Colorado)
- C. a. washingtonia Clench, 1944 (Washington)
