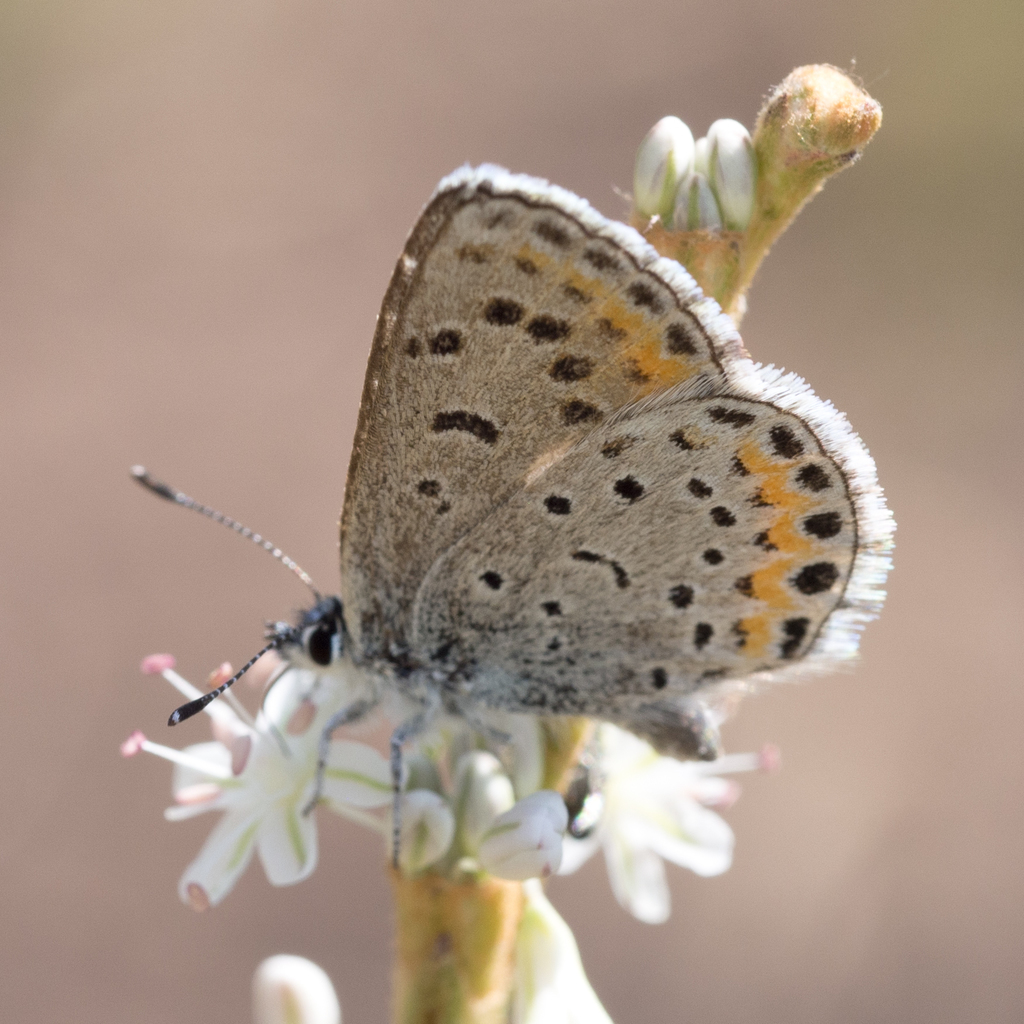

Scientific classification
- Kingdom: Animalia
- Phylum: Arthropoda
- Clade: Pancrustacea
- Class: Insecta
- Order: Lepidoptera
- Family: Lycaenidae
- Genus: Euphilotes
- Species: E. spaldingi

Binomial name
- Euphilotes spaldingi (Barnes & McDunnough, 1917)

= Euphilotes spaldingi =

Species of butterfly

Euphilotes spaldingi, or Spalding's blue, is a butterfly of the family Lycaenidae. The species was first described by William Barnes and James Halliday McDunnough in 1917. It is found in North America.

The MONA or Hodges number for Euphilotes spaldingi is 4369.1.

== Subspecies ==
Two subspecies belong to Euphilotes spaldingi:

- Euphilotes spaldingi pinjuna Scott, 1981^{i g}
- Euphilotes spaldingi spaldingi (Barnes & McDunnough, 1917)^{i g}

Data sources: i = ITIS, c = Catalogue of Life, g = GBIF, b = BugGuide
