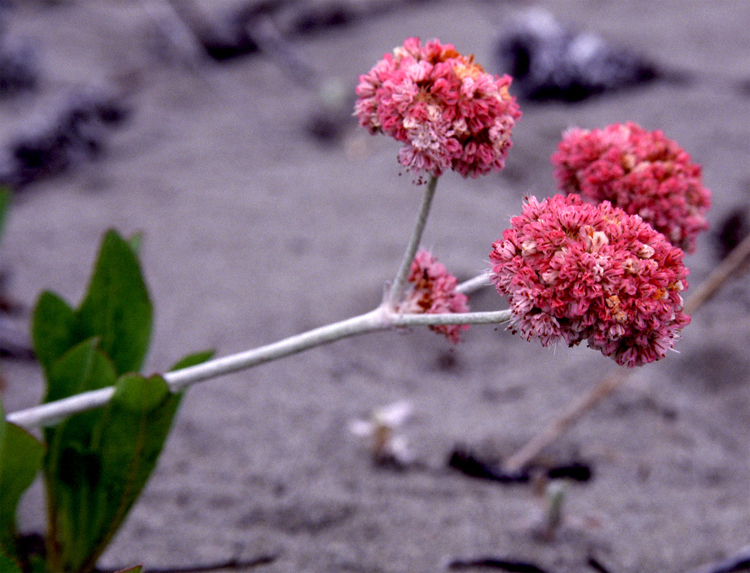

Scientific classification
- Kingdom: Plantae
- Clade: Tracheophytes
- Clade: Angiosperms
- Clade: Eudicots
- Order: Caryophyllales
- Family: Polygonaceae
- Genus: Eriogonum
- Species: E. latifolium

Binomial name
- Eriogonum latifolium Sm.

= Eriogonum latifolium =

Species of wild buckwheat

Eriogonum latifolium is a species of wild buckwheat known by the common names seaside buckwheat and coast buckwheat. This plant is native to the coastline of the western United States from Southwest Oregon to central California, where it is a common resident of coastal bluffs and scrub.

== Description ==
Eriogonum latifolium is a perennial herb which is variable in size. Its height is dependent in part on its degree of exposure to the stiff maritime winds of its habitat. It can be very small or sprawl to a maximum height of 70 centimeters. Its pale white-green leaves are oval, woolly, sometimes waxy, and mostly basal. The leaves can extend up if there is an erect stem.

At the end of each branch is a cluster of pinkish flowers. Flowers can also be white or red in color.

== Uses ==
=== Human ===
Eriogonum latifolium has been traditionally used by coastal tribes of Native Americans for various medicinal and cultural purposes. In California, a decoction of Eriogonum latifolium's roots, stems, and leaves was used to treat colds, coughs, gynecological issues, and sore eyes by the Ohlone and Round Valley Indians.

=== Wildlife ===
This species is a key native source of nectar for sand dune pollinators. In particular, Eriogonum latifolium together with Eriogonum parvifolium is important for the subsistence of Smith's Blue Butterfly and the Bramble Hairstreak Butterfly.
