= Sand Mountain (Nevada) =

Sand dune in Nevada, United States

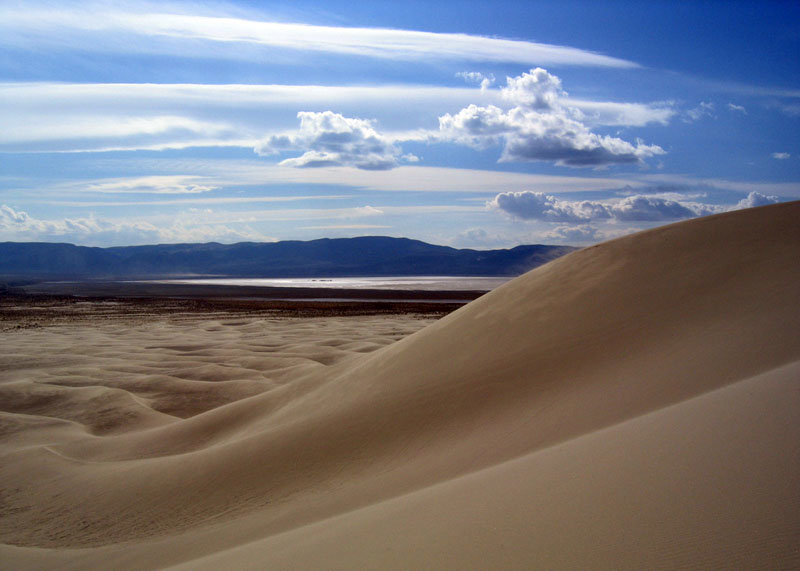

Highest point
- Coordinates: 39°18′31″N 118°23′49″W

Geography
- Location within Nevada
- Location: Churchill County, Nevada, United States
- Topo map: USGS Fourmile Flat

Nevada Historical Marker
- Reference no.: 10

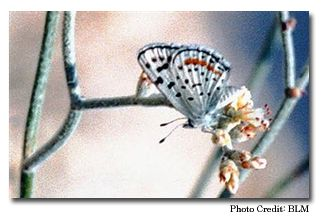
Sand Mountain blue butterfly

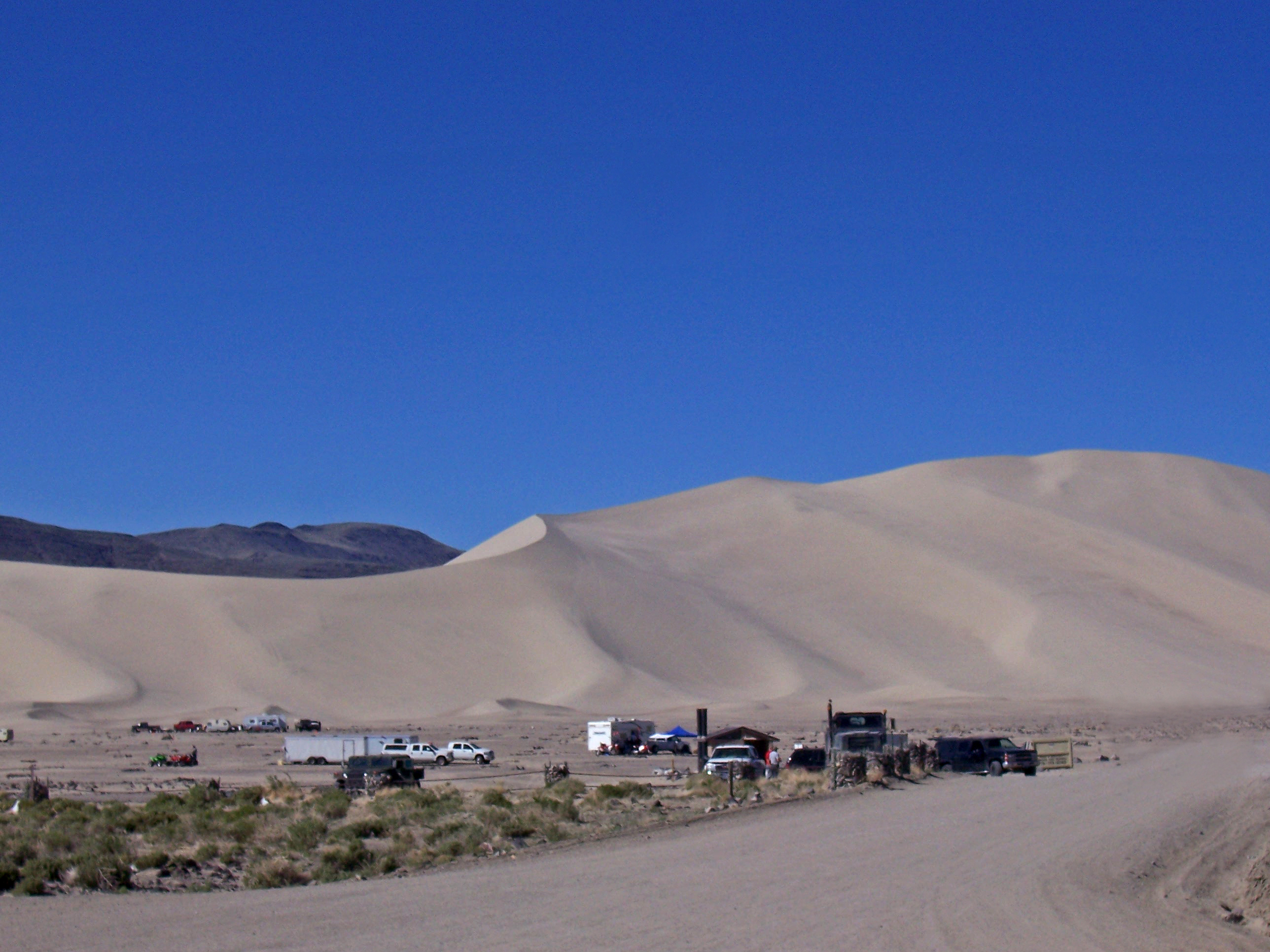
Sand Mountain Recreation Area, campground and OHVs

Sand Mountain is a singing sand dune 20 miles (32 km) east of Fallon, Nevada along U.S. Route 50. The dune is two miles long and 600 feet (180 m) high. The full sand field area is 3.25 square miles. The sand originates from the ancient Lake Lahontan, that for the most part dried up 9,000 years ago. Sand Mountain Recreation Area is managed by the Bureau of Land Management and is open to off-highway vehicle use. The area is also the only home of the critically imperiled Sand Mountain blue butterfly. The ruins of the Sand Springs Station of the Pony Express are also located within the recreation area. Sport activities such as sandboarding and sand skiing can be practiced at the site.

Off-road vehicle rules

- Camp only in designated areas.
- 8 feet (2.4 m) whip flags are required on all vehicles riding in the dunes.
- Do not burn wood containing nails, screws or other metal hardware.
- Burning tires is prohibited.
- Speed limit is 15 miles per hour (24 km/h) in camping areas.
- Possession or use of any glass cup or bottle is not allowed.
- Users must pay an area fee of $90 per year or $40 per week collected by the Bureau of Land Management.
- Avoid riding in areas closed to motor vehicles.
