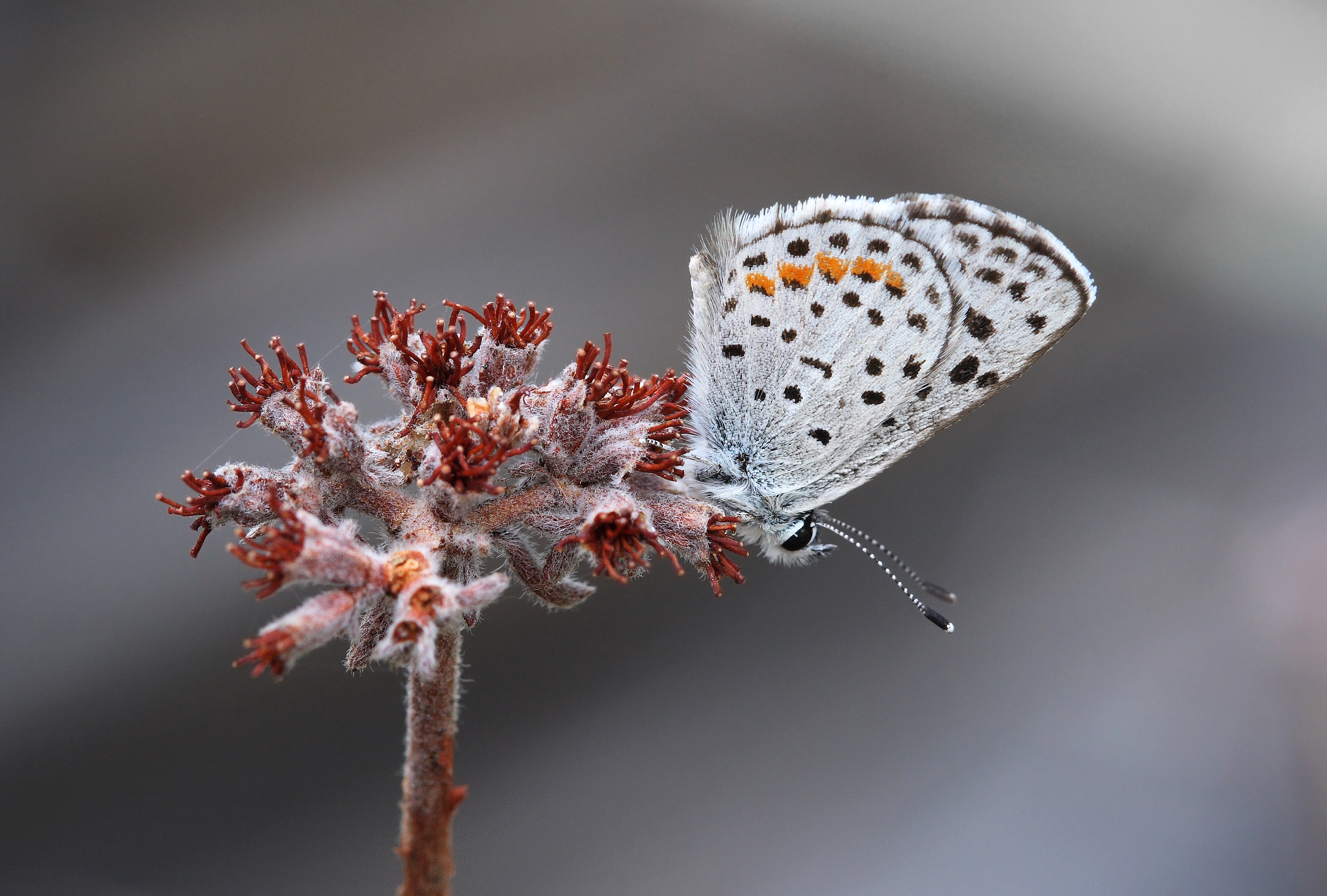

Scientific classification
- Kingdom: Animalia
- Phylum: Arthropoda
- Class: Insecta
- Order: Lepidoptera
- Family: Lycaenidae
- Genus: Euphilotes
- Species: E. battoides

Binomial name
- Euphilotes battoides (Behr, 1867)

Synonyms
- Rusticus battoides; Philotes battoides; Euphilotes glaucon; Rusticus glaucon; Philotes glaucon

= Euphilotes battoides =

Species of butterfly

Euphilotes battoides, the square-spotted blue or buckwheat blue, is a species of butterfly of the family Lycaenidae.

== Distribution ==
It is found in western North America from California south to Baja California Norte and then west to southern Colorado and New Mexico. This species may also occur in Oregon and Washington, but more study is needed to verify this.

The wingspan is 16–17 mm. Adults are on wing from mid April to August in one generation per year. They feed on the flower nectar of various plants, but mostly Eriogonum species.

== Subspecies ==
- E. b. battoides (Behr, 1867) (California)
- E. b. comstocki (Shields, 1975)
- E. b. centralis (Barnes & McDunnough, 1917) (southern Colorado to northern New Mexico)
- E. b. argocyanea (Pratt and J. Emmel, 1998)
- E. b. fusimaculata (Pratt and J. Emmel, 1998)
- E. b. mazourka (Pratt and J. Emmel, 1998)
- E. b. panamintensis (Pratt and J. Emmel, 1998)
- E. b. vernalis (Pratt and J. Emmel, 1998)

== Invalid Subspecies ==
- ~~E. b. allyni~~ (Shields, 1975). The El Segundo blue was originally thought to be a subspecies, but recent authorities consider it as a distinct, valid species (Euphilotes allyni).
- ~~E. b. bernardino~~ (Barnes & McDunnough, 1916) – Bernardino Square-spotted Blue
- ~~E. b. centralis~~ (Barnes & McDunnough, 1917)
- ~~E. b. glaucon~~ (Edwards, 1871) (British Columbia to northeastern California and southern Idaho)
- ~~E. b. intermedia~~ (Barnes & McDunnough, 1917)
- ~~E. b. baueri~~ (Shields, 1975)
- ~~E. b. ellisi~~ (Shields, 1975)
