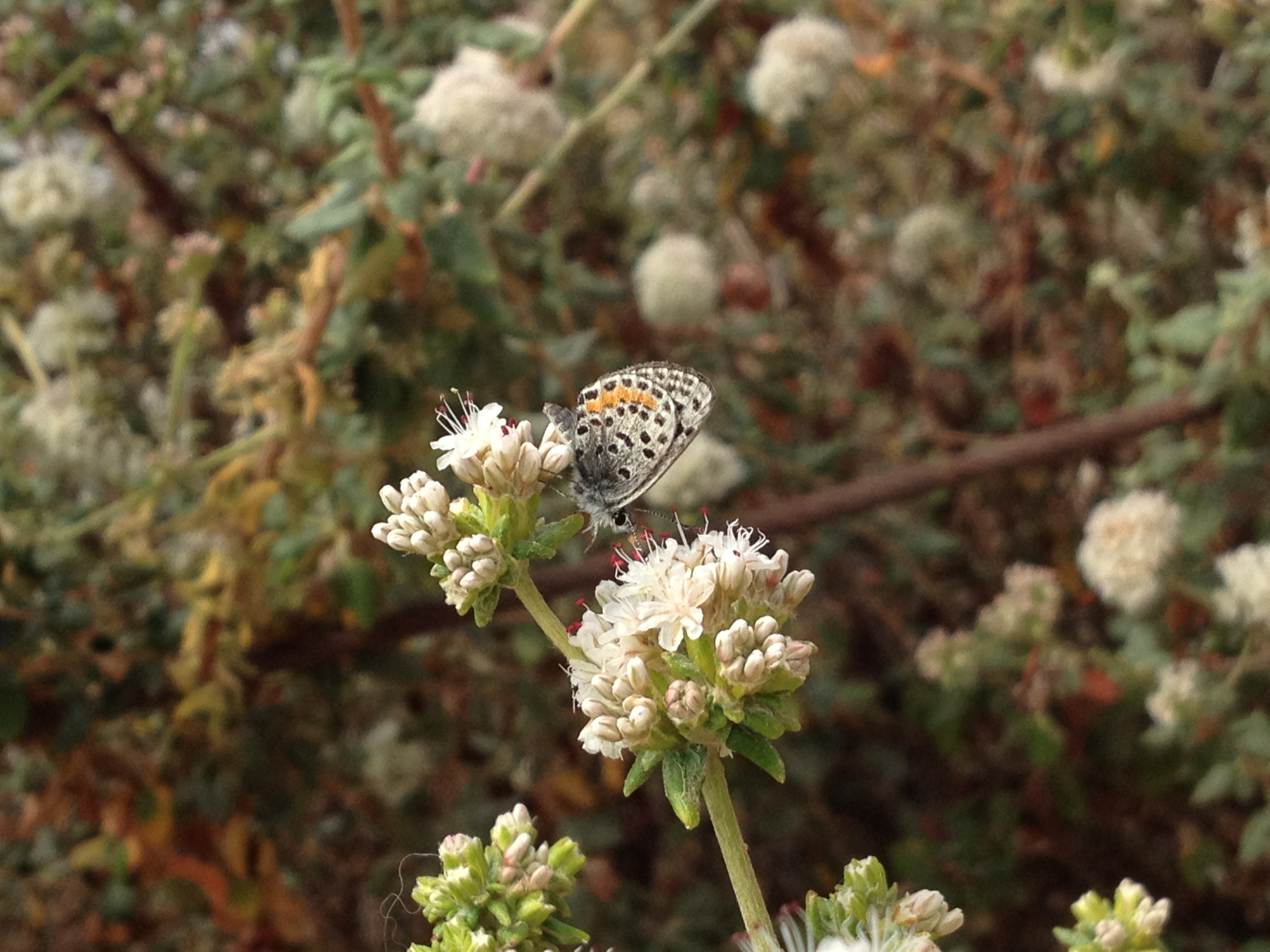

Conservation status
- Critically Imperiled (NatureServe)

- Endangered (ESA)

Scientific classification
- Kingdom: Animalia
- Phylum: Arthropoda
- Clade: Pancrustacea
- Class: Insecta
- Order: Lepidoptera
- Family: Lycaenidae
- Genus: Euphilotes
- Species: E. allyni

Binomial name
- Euphilotes allyni O. Shields, 1975

Synonyms
- Shijimiaeoides battoides allyni; Euphilotes bernardino allyni; Euphilotes battoides allyni

= El Segundo blue =

Species of butterfly

The El Segundo blue (Euphilotes allyni) is an endangered species of butterfly. It is endemic to a small dune ecosystem in Southern California that used to be a community called Palisades del Rey, close to the Los Angeles International Airport (LAX).

== Taxonomy ==
It was originally thought to be a subspecies of the square-spotted blue (E. battoides) or the Bernardino blue (E. bernardino), but recent authorities consider it its own species.

== Conservation ==
In 1976 it became a federally designated endangered species. This butterfly’s habitat has been substantially reduced due to urban development and invasive plants, and it now exists as a handful of populations restricted to coastal dunes in the vicinity of Los Angeles.

== Distribution and habitat ==
The El Segundo Blue Butterfly Habitat Preserve next to LAX exists to protect the subspecies. Until 2013, there were only three colonies of this tiny butterfly still in existence. The largest of these is on the grounds of LAX; a further colony exists on a site within the huge Chevron El Segundo oil refinery complex, and the smallest colony is an area of only a few square yards on a local beach. In 2013, the El Segundo blue was discovered living and breeding in the Ballona Wetlands, and its range now extends south to the Palos Verdes Peninsula and some have been located in Santa Barbara County. The butterfly lays its eggs on Seacliff buckwheat (Eriogonum parvifolium), which the adults also use as a nectar source. This is its host plant. Recently, some nearby beach cities such as Redondo Beach have replaced ice plant growth near the beaches with seacliff buckwheat (erigonum parvifolium), in order to provide the butterflies with more of their natural food source.

| 2011 | 111,5 |
| 2013 | 43,4 |
| 2015 | 24,5 |
Population of the El Segundo Blue per year (minimum count in 1000 individuals)

== See also ==
- Palos Verdes blue
