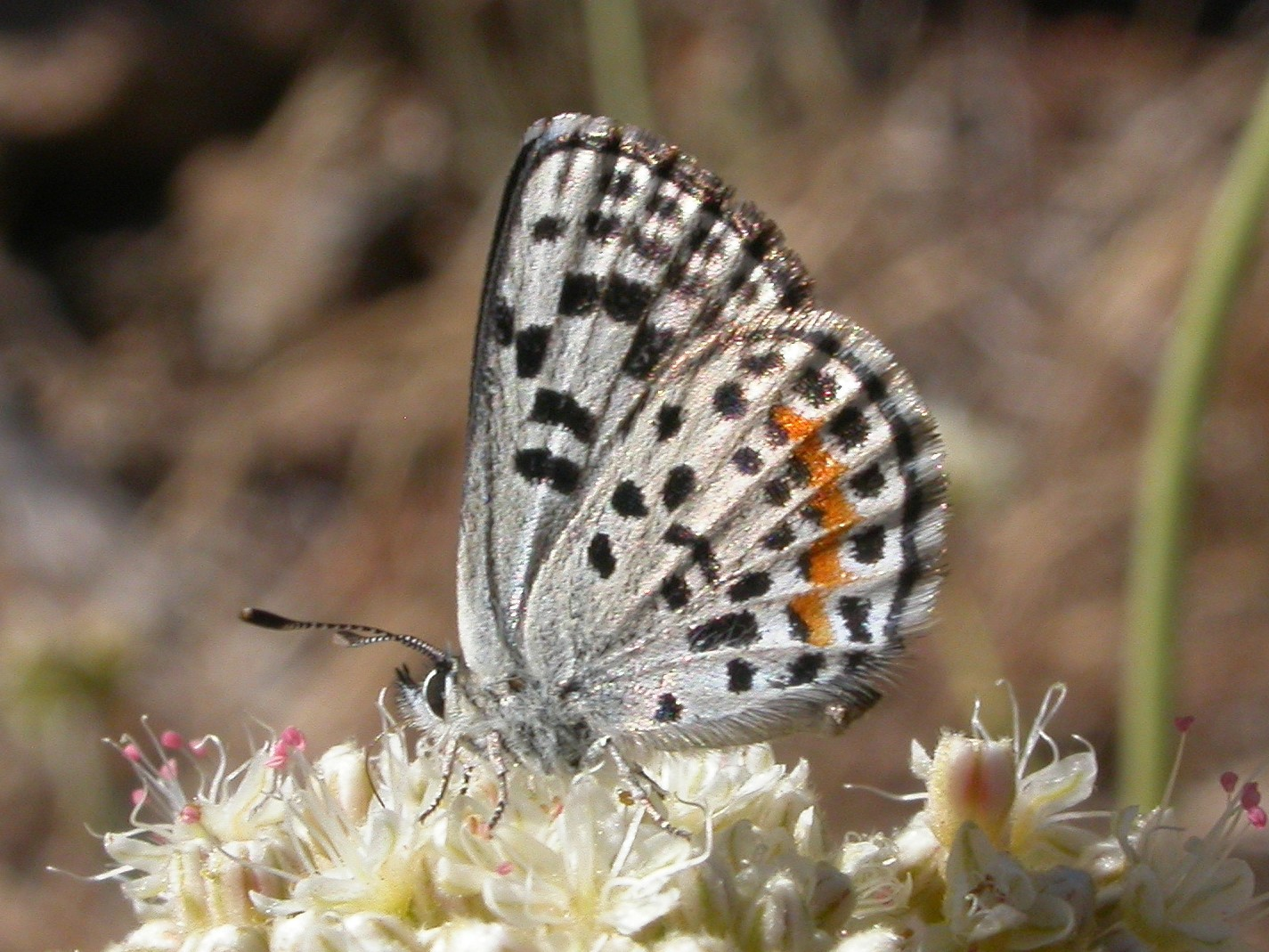

Scientific classification
- Kingdom: Animalia
- Phylum: Arthropoda
- Clade: Pancrustacea
- Class: Insecta
- Order: Lepidoptera
- Family: Lycaenidae
- Genus: Euphilotes
- Species: E. bernardino

Binomial name
- Euphilotes bernardino (Barnes & McDunnough, 1916)

= Euphilotes bernardino =

Species of butterfly

Euphilotes bernardino, the Bernardino blue, is a butterfly in the family Lycaenidae. The species was first described by William Barnes and James Halliday McDunnough in 1916. It is found in North America.

== Subspecies ==
Four subspecies belong to Euphilotes bernardino:

- Euphilotes bernardino bernardino (Barnes & McDunnough, 1916)^{i g}
- Euphilotes bernardino inyomontana Pratt & J. Emmel in T. Emmel, 1998^{i g}
- Euphilotes bernardino martini (Mattoni, 1954)^{i}
- Euphilotes bernardino minuta Austin in T. Emmel, 1998^{i g}

Data sources: i = ITIS, c = Catalogue of Life, g = GBIF, b = BugGuide

The El Segundo blue (Euphilotes allyni) was originally thought to be a subspecies, but recent authorities consider it its own species.
