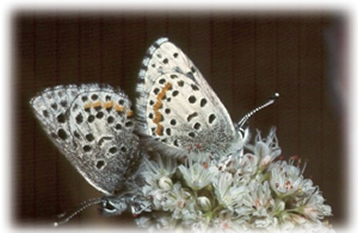
- Smith's blue butterfly

Conservation status
- Endangered (ESA)

Scientific classification
- Domain: Eukaryota
- Kingdom: Animalia
- Phylum: Arthropoda
- Class: Insecta
- Order: Lepidoptera
- Family: Lycaenidae
- Genus: Euphilotes
- Species: E. enoptes
- Subspecies: E. e. smithi

Trinomial name
- Euphilotes enoptes smithi (Mattoni, 1955)

= Smith's blue butterfly =

Subspecies of butterfly

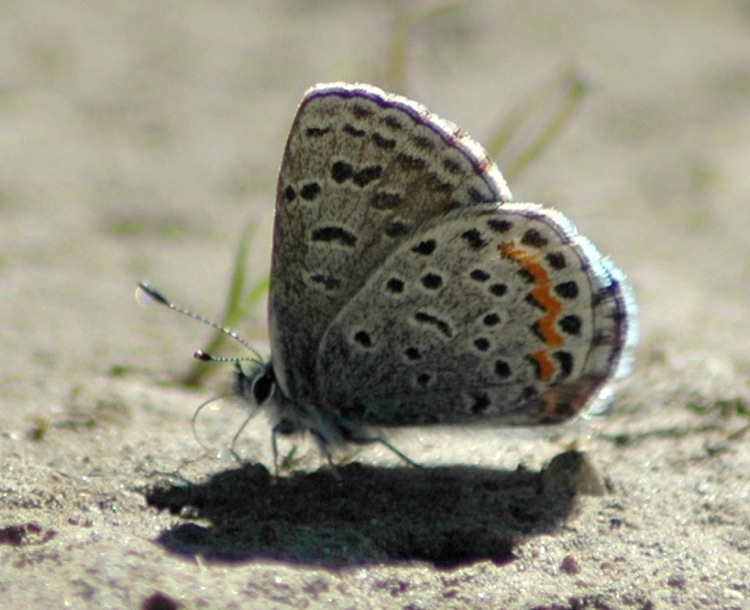
Euphilotes enoptes, Dutchman's Peak, Oregon

Smith's blue butterfly, Euphilotes enoptes smithi, is a subspecies of butterfly in the family Lycaenidae. This federally listed endangered subspecies of Euphilotes enoptes occurs in fragmented populations along the Central Coast of California, primarily associated with sand dune habitat in one case with a dune-based Maritime Coast Range Ponderosa Pine forest in the Carbonera Creek watershed in Santa Cruz County. The range of E. e. smithi is from Monterey Bay south to Punta Gorda.

Over half of the original habitat of E. e. smithi has been destroyed by human overpopulation, coastal highway development and trampling of habitat, and invasive plants. Several sites are currently being protected to conserve Smith's blue butterfly, including the Maritime Coast Range Ponderosa Pine forest at Carbonera Creek and a preserve at Fort Ord, California—the first site ever chosen for management on behalf of an insect in the United States. E. e. smithi is associated with two species of buckwheat (Eriogonum latifolium and Eriogonum parvifolium) during all of its life phases, such that decline in these buckwheat species' populations poses further threats to this butterfly.

== Morphology ==
Euphilotes enoptes smithi is a small butterfly with a wingspan no greater than 2.5 centimeters. Males manifest dorsal wing color of a bright lustrous blue, while females exhibit brown dorsal coloration. Both sexes have with orange-red band markings on the hind dorsal wings. Ventral wing coloration for both males and females is a whitish gray, punctuated with black speckling.

== Life cycle and behavior ==
During its whole lifespan, the Smith's blue butterfly uses only two host buckwheat: Eriogonum latifolium and Eriogonum parvifolium. After emerging in August or September, adult butterflies mate and deposit eggs on the flowers of these host plants. Hatching transpires soon afterward, and the larvae begin to feed on the flowers of the very same plant. The larvae have chewing mouthparts to feed on the host's flower petals as well as seeds in the flower head. Larvae have a cryptic coloration markings, closely resembling that of the blossoms where they hide. The caterpillar matures through four larval stages or instars in about 24 days before becoming a chrysalis. The pupation then occurs in the flower head itself or below in the leaf litter.

Subsequent to several weeks of feeding and growth, the larvae molt to yield a pupal phase, starting a 41-week period of transformation. The following year, as the Eriogonum blossom again, new adults emerge, and the cycle repeats. Smith's blue butterflies have a lifespan of approximately one week. Their single week of daytime-only flight is further limited to temperatures above 60°F and to times and locales where wind velocities are quite low. Within that one week, they must do sufficient feeding to sustain, they must avoid predation, find and court a mate, and copulate. Then the female must lay the resulting eggs.

Early season males have a difficult challenge in finding females since the first females emerge about seven days after the first males. In the early season, it is common that several males congregate around a newly emerged female. Stimulated by pheromones emitted from the female, they become eager to mate before the end of their short lives. The overall population of adults is active between early June to early September.

== History and conservation ==
Smith's blue butterfly was recorded in the scientific literature in the mid-1950s. Rudi Mattoni collected the first specimen of Smith's blue on a trip to the Big Sur region with his friend Claude I. Smith: that collection occurred in the vicinity of Dolans Creek in the year 1948 when both men were undergraduates at the University of California, Berkeley. Smith was killed in a freak accident, being swept to sea by a rogue wave while fishing from a rock at Half Moon Bay. Only thereafter did Mattoni analyze his specimen carefully, which he knew was previously undocumented; then he proceeded to publish a treatise on Smith's blue as his Ph.D. dissertation. In tribute to his friend, Mattoni gave Smith's name to the butterfly they had discovered together.
