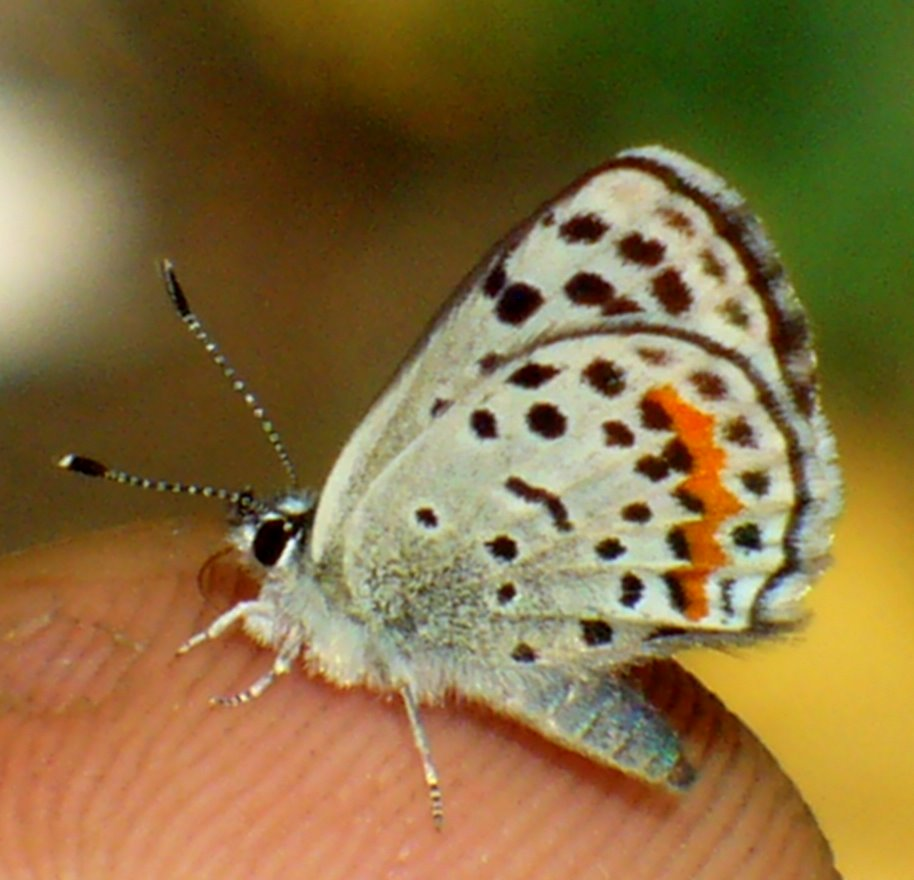

Scientific classification
- Domain: Eukaryota
- Kingdom: Animalia
- Phylum: Arthropoda
- Class: Insecta
- Order: Lepidoptera
- Family: Lycaenidae
- Subfamily: Polyommatinae
- Tribe: Polyommatini
- Genus: Euphilotes (Mattoni, [1978])

= Euphilotes =

Butterfly genus in family Lycaenidae

Euphilotes is a genus of butterflies in the family Lycaenidae, which consists of a number of species found in western North America. Some of the species are endangered, such as the Smith's blue, Euphilotes enoptes smithi.

== Species ==
Listed alphabetically:

- Euphilotes ancilla (Barnes & McDunnough, 1918) – Rocky Mountain dotted blue
- Euphilotes allyni (Shields, 1975) – El Segundo blue
- Euphilotes battoides (Behr, 1867) – Square-spotted blue or buckwheat blue
- Euphilotes baueri (Shields, 1975) – Bauer's dotted-blue
- Euphilotes bernardino (Barnes & McDunnough, 1916) – Bernardino blue or Bernardino dotted-blue
- Euphilotes centralis (Barnes & McDunnough, 1917)
- Euphilotes columbiae (Matoni, 1954) – Columbian blue
- Euphilotes ellisi (Shields, 1975) – Ellis dotted-blue
- Euphilotes enoptes (Boisduval, 1852) – Dotted blue
- Euphilotes glaucon (Edwards, 1871) – Glaucon blue or summit blue
- Ephilotes heracleoides (Kohler & Warren, 2021) – Pumice blue
- Euphilotes mojave (Watson & Comstock, 1920) – Mojave dotted-blue
- Euphilotes pallescens (Tilden & Downey, 1955) – Pale blue, pallid dotted-blue or pallid blue
- Euphilotes rita (Barnes & McDunnough, 1916) – Rita blue or desert buckwheat blue
- Euphilotes spaldingi (Barnes & McDunnough, 1917) – Colorado-Plateau blue

For ~~Euphilotes intermedia~~ (Barnes & McDunnough, 1917) – intermediate dotted-blue INVALID, see Euphilotes glaucon intermedia (W. Barnes & McDunnough, 1917)

== See also ==
- Carbonera Creek
- Maritime coast range ponderosa pine forest
