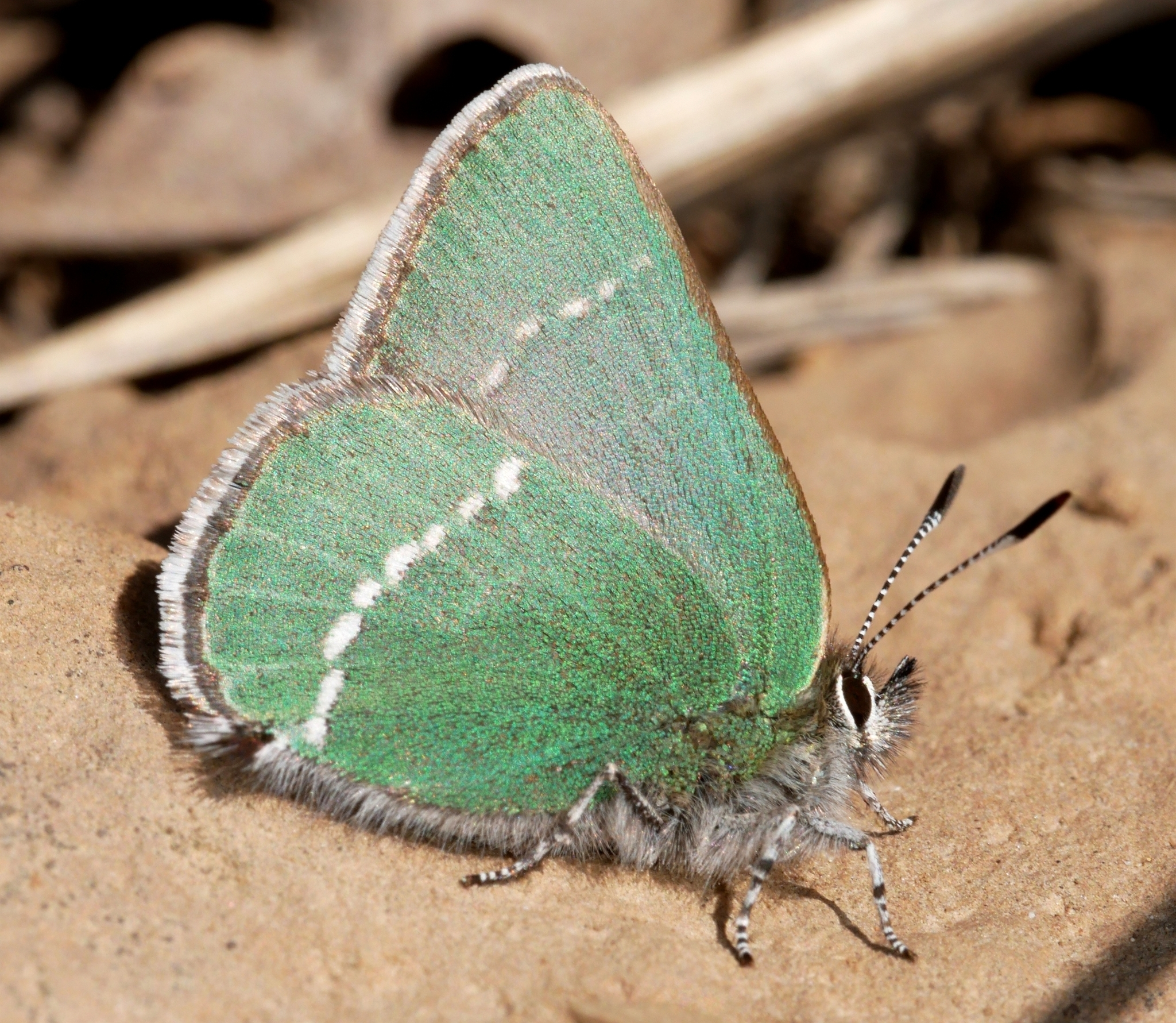
- In Utah

Scientific classification
- Kingdom: Animalia
- Phylum: Arthropoda
- Class: Insecta
- Order: Lepidoptera
- Family: Lycaenidae
- Genus: Callophrys
- Species: C. sheridanii

Binomial name
- Callophrys sheridanii W. H. Edwards, 1877

Synonyms
- Callophrys sheridani

= Callophrys sheridanii =

Species of butterfly

Callophrys sheridanii, the Sheridan's hairstreak and Sheridan's green hairstreak, is a butterfly in the family Lycaenidae. It is found in North America along the south coast of British Columbia and parts of Nevada, Arizona, Saskatchewan, North Dakota, and New Mexico. In 2009, this species was adopted as the U.S. state butterfly for Wyoming.

== Description ==
This small, tail-less butterfly has a wingspan of 20–24 millimetres (0.8–0.9 in). The upperside is dark gray brown, with underside color ranging from a bright green to dark gray green. The lower part of the forewing is gray. Callophrys sheridanii has a white postmedian line of dots that may be straight or bulged out, and even reduced or absent. It is named for its characteristic straight, white line crossing the underside of both wings, although this may be less distinct in specimens from southern British Columbia.

== Distribution ==
Although uncommon in Canada, this species is found from southern Alberta east to British Columbia. From British Columbia, the range extends south through Eastern Washington down to the Sierra Nevada of California. From Alberta, the species extends southward through the Rocky Mountains down to New Mexico.

== Range and habitat ==
Callophrys sheridanii remains within a range of approximately 6,000–10,000 feet (1,800–3,000 m), living in such environments as sagebrush scrub, dry, brushy hillsides in badlands, chaparral, woodlands, subalpine scree, open hillsides, and on canyon slopes and washes.

== Life history ==
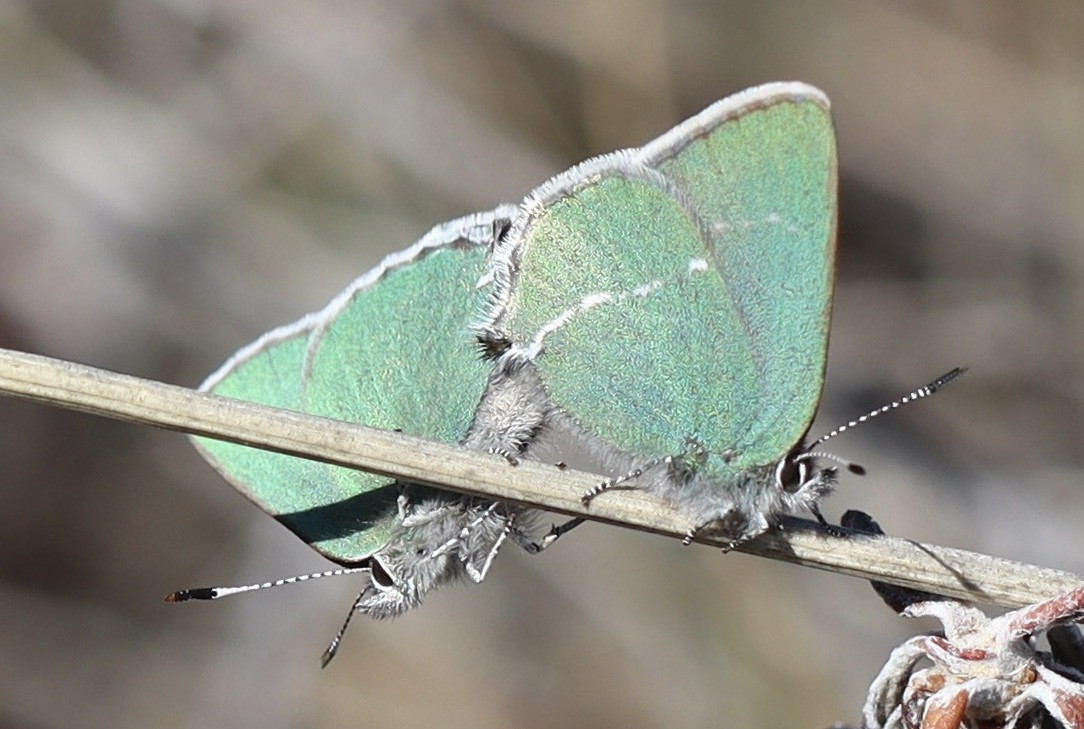
Mating, in British Columbia

Females have one brood between April and May. They lay eggs singly on various species of wild buckwheat leaves. The eggs are flattened and hemispherical in shape, and very pale green in color. The larvae range from a green to pink color and feed on buckwheat. The caterpillars are a light green to pink color, and are covered with bunches of short stiff pines. They have two rows of white spots running down the back. They eat the leaves, but some prefer to eat the flowers and young fruits. Chrysalids then hibernate. In Washington, the caterpillars feed on sulphur umbrella plants (Eriogonum umbellatum). In adulthood, males perch looking for female mates in depressions or gulch bottoms. The adults drink flower nectar. They take flight between March and June, with specimens from British Columbia flying from mid-April to late May, while specimens in Alberta flying mid-May until late June.

== Host plants ==
Callophrys sheridanii larvae and caterpillars feed on various species of wild buckwheat, including Eriogonum racemosum and Eriogonum heracleoides.

== Subspecies ==
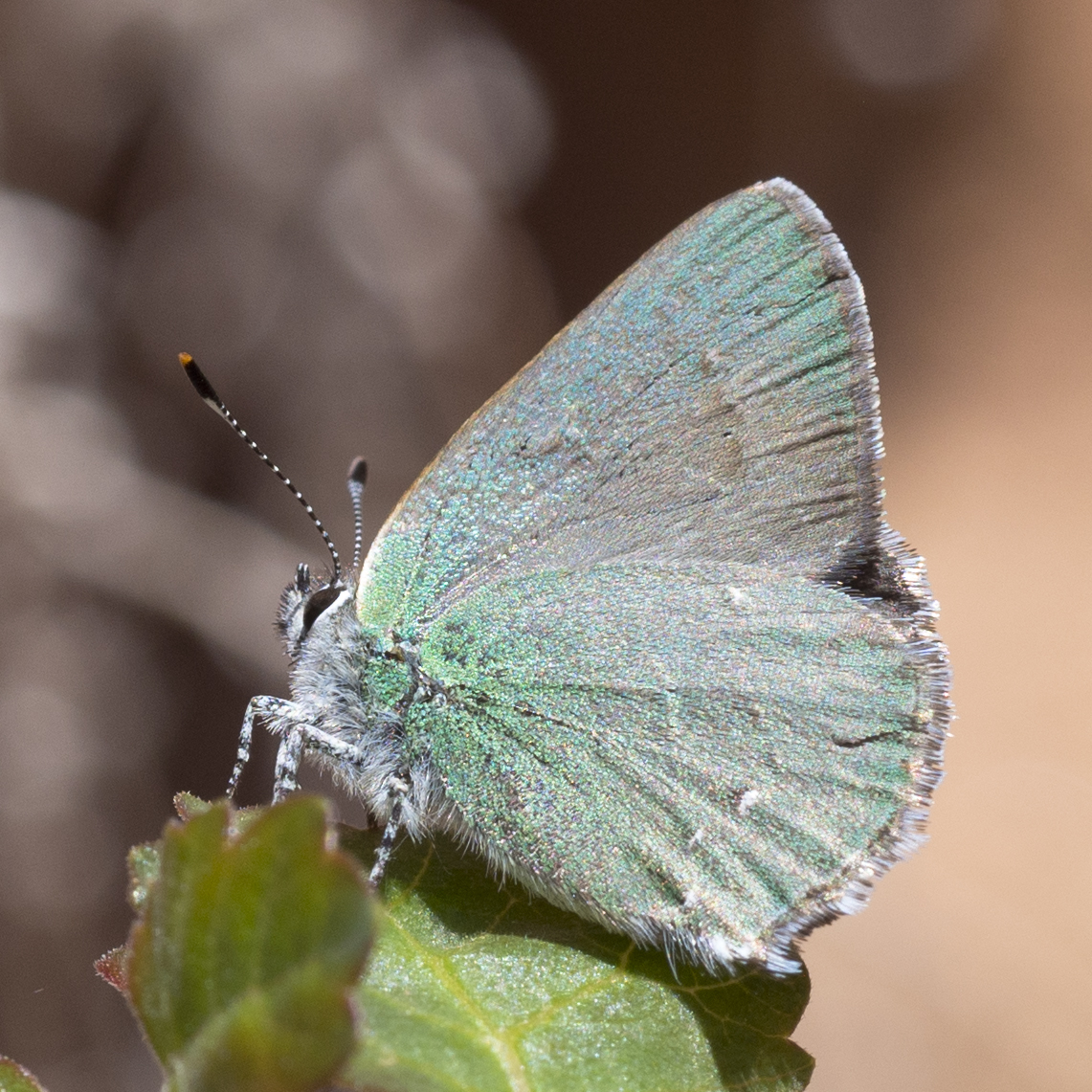
C. s. paradoxa, in Utah

- Callophrys sheridani sheridanii, white-lined Sheridan's hairstreak
- Callophrys sheridani comstocki, desert Sheridan's hairstreak
- Callophrys sheridani lemberti, alpine Sheridan's hairstreak
- Callophrys sheridani pseudodumetorum
- Callophrys sheridani newcomeri, whitelined green hairstreak (occurs in southern British Columbia)
- Callophrys sheridani neoperplexa, Sheridan's green hairstreak (occurs in southwestern Alberta)

== Similar species ==
All green hairstreaks appear very similar.

== Conservation status ==
Although quite rare in certain parts of its range, conservation is usually not required.

== See also ==
- List of butterflies of North America
