= Yerba santa =

Yerba santa or hierba santa (Spanish pronunciation: [ˈʝeɾβa ˈsanta]), meaning "sacred herb" in Spanish, can refer to:

- Hoja santa (Piper auritum)
- Species of the genus Eriodictyon, including Eriodictyon californicum and Eriodictyon crassifolium
