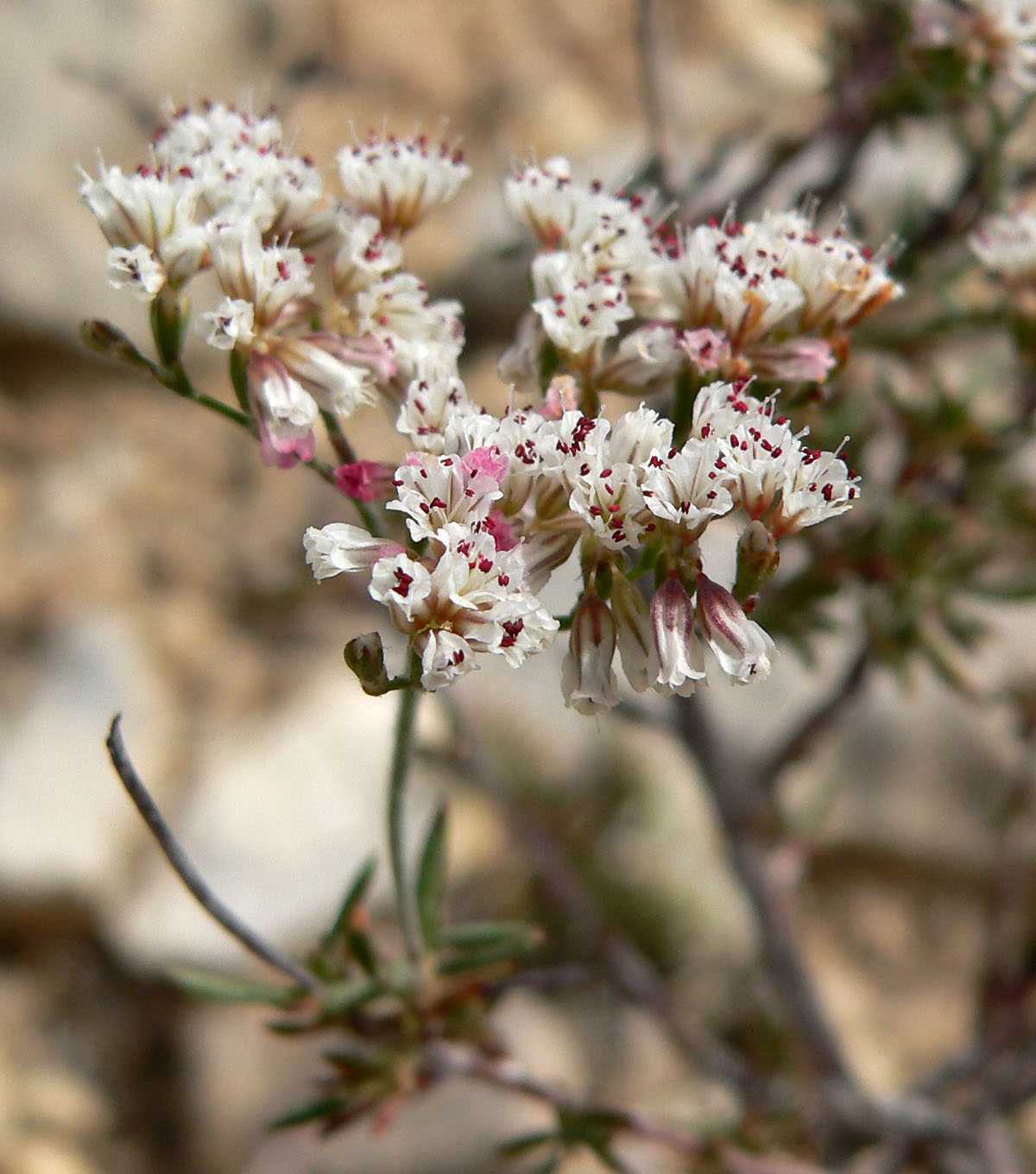
- var. simpsonii, southern Nevada

Scientific classification
- Kingdom: Plantae
- Clade: Tracheophytes
- Clade: Angiosperms
- Clade: Eudicots
- Order: Caryophyllales
- Family: Polygonaceae
- Genus: Eriogonum
- Species: E. microthecum

Binomial name
- Eriogonum microthecum Nutt.

= Eriogonum microthecum =

Species of wild buckwheat

Eriogonum microthecum is a species of wild buckwheat known by the common name slender buckwheat. It is native to the western United States where it is found in a variety of habitats, particularly in dry areas such as deserts.

== Description ==
This is a shrub which is quite variable in appearance. There are many varieties, some of which are isolated to small geographical distributions. It may be a low clumping plant or a sprawling shrub to one and a half meters in height and width. It has small, woolly leaves with rolled edges scattered about its branches.

The upper portion of the plant makes up its inflorescence, which often has a flat top. The tiny clustered flowers are white to yellow or sometimes pinkish.

== Varieties ==
Varieties include, but are not limited to:

- E. m. var. alpinum - (alpine slender buckwheat) - native to the high mountains of California, rarely tops 10 centimeters in height
- E. m. var. corymbosoides - (San Bernardino buckwheat) - a brown-flowered variety native to the San Bernardino Mountains
- E. m. var. lapidocola - (Inyo Mountains buckwheat) - a small variety native to the White and Inyo Mountains
