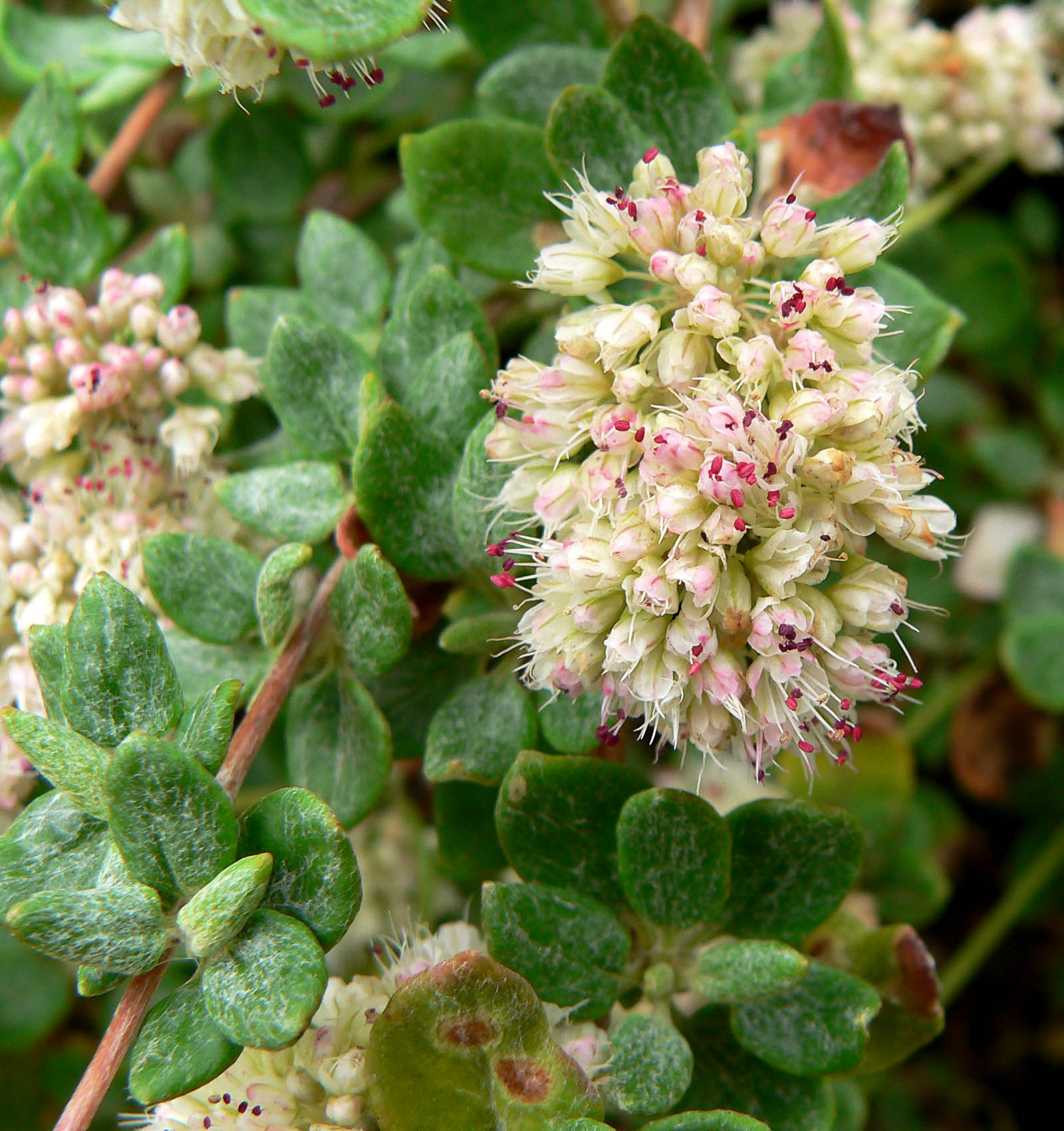

Scientific classification
- Kingdom: Plantae
- Clade: Embryophytes
- Clade: Tracheophytes
- Clade: Angiosperms
- Clade: Eudicots
- Order: Caryophyllales
- Family: Polygonaceae
- Genus: Eriogonum
- Species: E. parvifolium

Binomial name
- Eriogonum parvifolium Sm.

= Eriogonum parvifolium =

Species of wild buckwheat

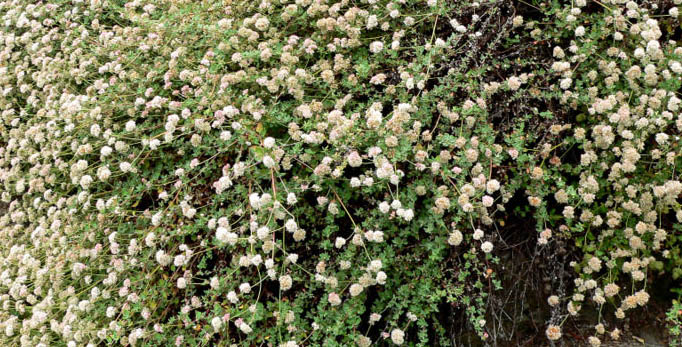
E. parvifolium

Eriogonum parvifolium is a species in the family Polygonaceae that occurs on dune formations in the coastal area of Central and Southern California. This evergreen shrub grows to a height of 30 to 100 centimeters with a spread of approximately the same dimension. This plant is an important host for a number of pollinating insects including certain endangered species. E. parvifolium occurs both on bluffs along the Pacific Ocean coast as well as Coastal Strand dunes formations, but is restricted to altitudes below 700 meters. In at least one instance within the Carbonera Creek watershed, it occurs farther inland in a Maritime Coast Range Ponderosa Pine forest. This shrub is also known by the common names dune buckwheat, coast buckwheat, cliff buckwheat, seacliff buckwheat, or seacliff wild buckwheat.

== Description ==
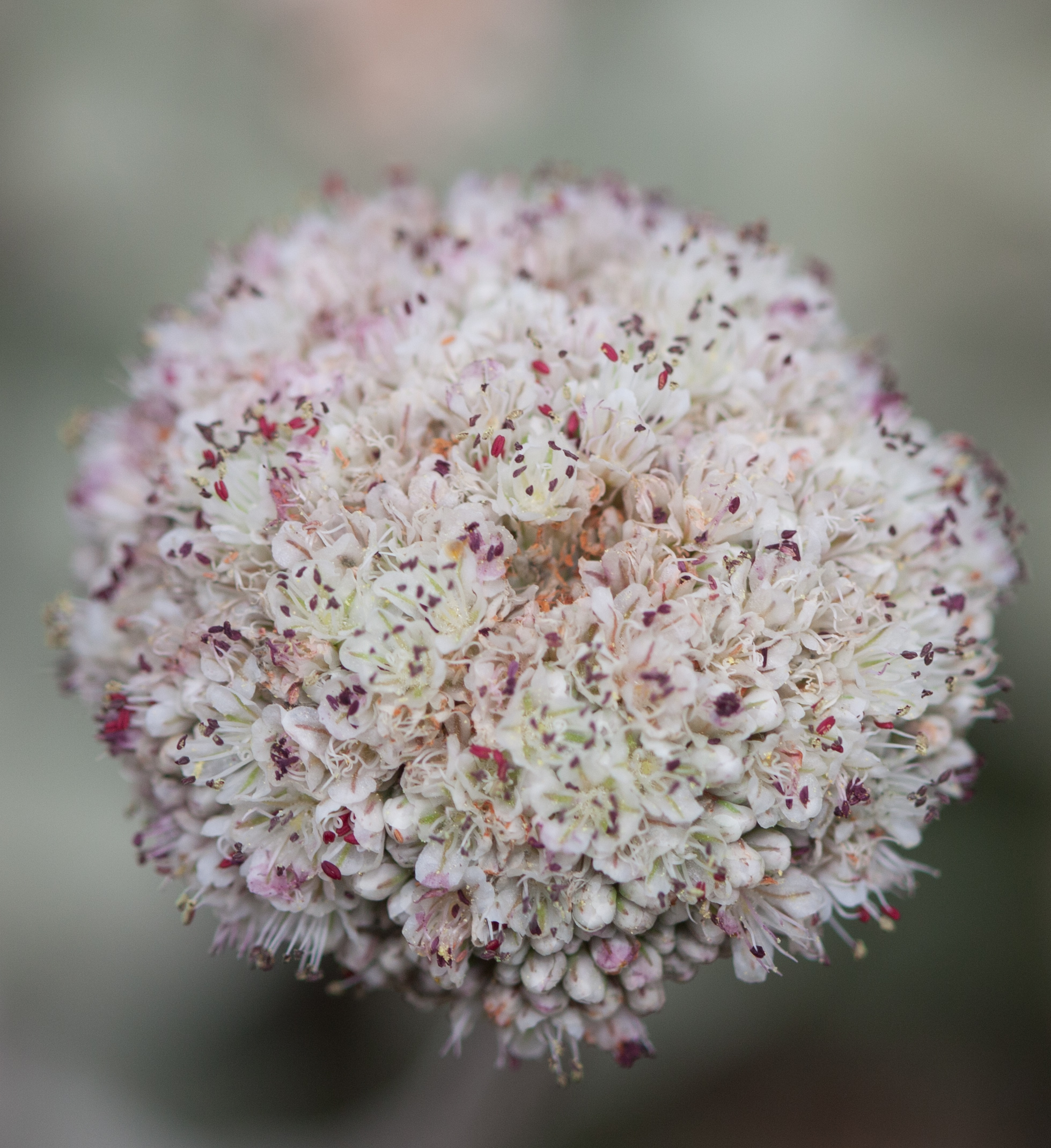
Coast Buckwheat flower at Point Reyes National Seashore

The thick cauline leaves are five to thirty millimeters in size and may be lanceolate to rounded. Alternatively leaves may be folded under, with the result of appearing more or less triangular; moreover they are smooth on the upper surfaces and woolly below. Foliage is green with reddish tinge, and the flowers white to pinkish or yellowish-green. The perianth measures 2.5 to 3.0 millimeters. This plant's glabrous fruits are 2.5 to 3.0 millimeters across.

== Ecology ==
E. parvifolium grows in sandy soils with pH ranging from five to eight (e.g. tolerates mildly acidic to mildly alkaline soils). In cultivation this species will actually tolerate clay soils. While this shrub grows in part to full sun, it may tolerate shade in cultivation. It is not subject to herbivory by deer, although many smaller fauna will consume its flowers, fruits and leaves. This species thrives in rainfall regimes of 39 to 78 centimeters per annum.

Dune buckwheat is the host plant to a large variety of insects, and thus there is intense competition among various insects. Specifically it is a host plant to ten different Lepidoptera species, including the El Segundo blue butterfly and Smith's blue butterfly; moreover, in the case of the El Segundo blue, it is the only host plant used by that species in all of its life stages.

== Conservation ==
Because of the host relationship to number of insect species, E. parvifolium has been the subject of numerous restoration programs including a significant and well researched program at Los Angeles International Airport, one of only three extant colonies of the endangered El Segundo blue.
