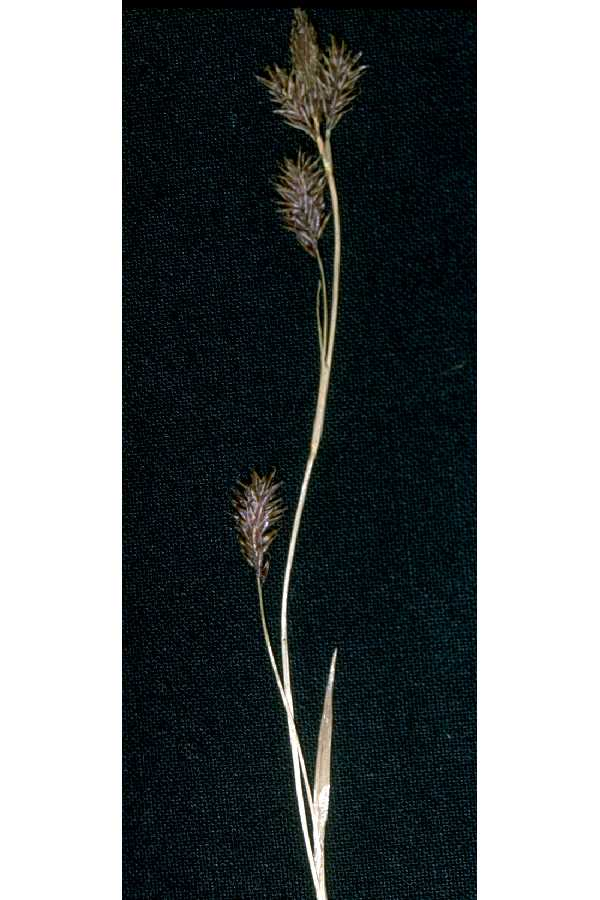

Conservation status
- Least Concern (IUCN 3.1)

Scientific classification
- Kingdom: Plantae
- Clade: Tracheophytes
- Clade: Angiosperms
- Clade: Monocots
- Clade: Commelinids
- Order: Poales
- Family: Cyperaceae
- Genus: Carex
- Species: C. luzulina

Binomial name
- Carex luzulina Olney

= Carex luzulina =

Species of grass-like plant

Carex luzulina is a species of sedge known by the common name woodrush sedge. It is native to Canada and the USA.

== Description ==
Carex luzulina produces loose to dense clumps of rhizomed stems approaching 90 centimeters in maximum height. The inflorescence is made up of a few spikes of flowers with dark colored scales. The fruit is coated in a sac called a perigynium which is generally greenish with some dark purple coloration.

== Distribution and habitat ==
This sedge is native to western North America from British Columbia to California to Wyoming, where it grows in wet habitat such as bogs and mountain meadows.

== Varieties ==
- Carex luzulina var. ablata
- Carex luzulina var. atropurpurea
- Carex luzulina var. luzulina

== See also ==
- Luzula - "Woodrush"
- Luzula comosa
- Luzula divaricata
- Luzula orestera
