= Snowy wood-rush =

Snowy wood-rush (with or without hyphenation) may refer to one of two plants in the genus Luzula which share the common name:

- Luzula nivea, also known as lesser wood-rush
- Luzula nivalis, also known as arctic wood-rush
