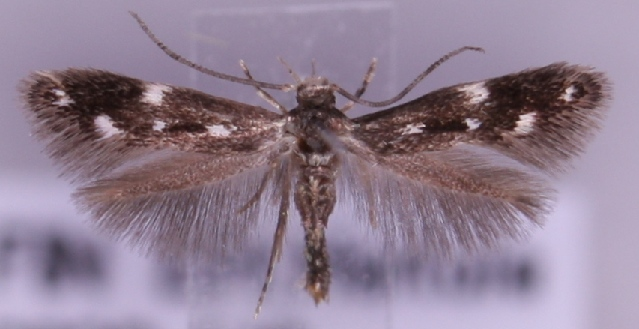

Scientific classification
- Kingdom: Animalia
- Phylum: Arthropoda
- Clade: Pancrustacea
- Class: Insecta
- Order: Lepidoptera
- Family: Elachistidae
- Genus: Elachista
- Species: E. trapeziella

Binomial name
- Elachista trapeziella Stainton, 1849

Synonyms
- Biselachista trapeziella

= Elachista trapeziella =

Species of moth

Elachista trapeziella is a moth of the family Elachistidae found in Europe.

The wingspan is 8–10 millimetres (0.31–0.39 in). The head is grey, face white. Forewings are blackish; a spot on fold towards base, one on middle of costa and another beneath it on fold, in female larger and sometimes confluent, a fourth on tornus, and a fifth at apex shining white. Hindwings are dark fuscous. The larva is greenish-grey, faintly reddish tinged.

Adults are on wing from June to August.

The larvae feed on white wood-rush (Luzula luzuloides), hairy wood-rush (Luzula pilosa) and greater wood-rush (Luzula sylvatica). They mine the leaves of their host plant. Pupation takes place outside of the mine. They are pink with three cream-coloured length lines and a black head. Larvae can be found from autumn to April or June of the following year.

== Distribution ==
It is found from Fennoscandia to the Pyrenees and Italy and from Ireland to Slovakia.
