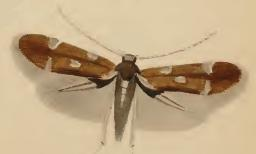

Scientific classification
- Kingdom: Animalia
- Phylum: Arthropoda
- Clade: Pancrustacea
- Class: Insecta
- Order: Lepidoptera
- Family: Elachistidae
- Genus: Elachista
- Species: E. quadripunctella

Binomial name
- Elachista quadripunctella (Hübner, 1825)

Synonyms
- Chionodes quadripunctella Hübner, 1825; Elachista quadrella (Hübner, 1905)

= Elachista quadripunctella =

Species of moth

Elachista quadripunctella is a moth of the family, Elachistidae. It is found from Scandinavia and Latvia to the Pyrenees and Italy and from France to Romania.

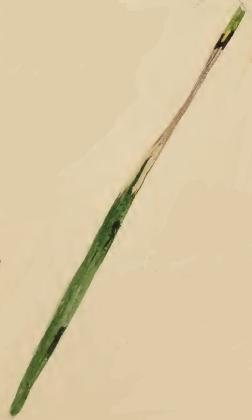
Mined leaf of Luzula pilosa

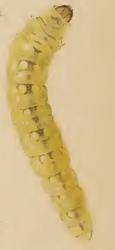
Larva

The wingspan is 10–12 mm.

The larvae feed on Carex flacca, Luzula luzuloides, Luzula pilosa and Luzula sylvatica. They mine the leaves of their host plant. A single larva makes several mines. Pupation takes place within the mine. They are colourless. Larvae can be found from the end of September to the following spring.
