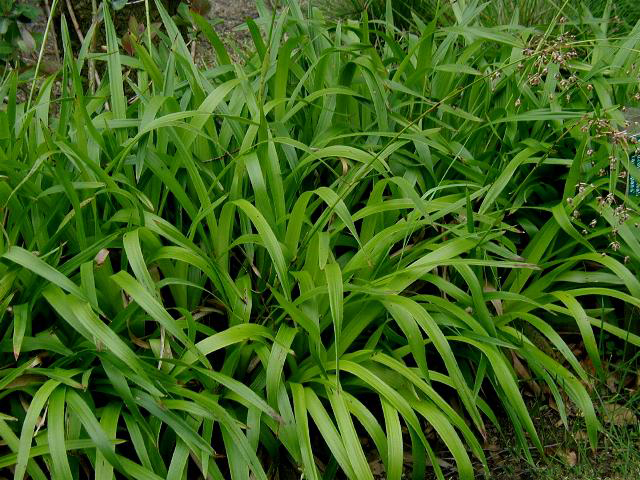
- Luzula sylvatica, great wood-rush

Scientific classification
- Kingdom: Plantae
- Clade: Embryophytes
- Clade: Tracheophytes
- Clade: Spermatophytes
- Clade: Angiosperms
- Clade: Monocots
- Clade: Commelinids
- Order: Poales
- Family: Juncaceae
- Genus: Luzula; DC., conserved name

Synonyms
- Cyperella J.G.H.Kramer ex MacMill.; Ebingeria Chrtek & Krísa; Gymnodes (Griseb.) Fourr.; Juncoides Ség., rejected name; Luciola Sm., superfluous name; Nemorinia Fourr.; Pterodes (Griseb.) Börner

= Luzula =

Genus of flowering plants in the rush family

Luzula is a genus of flowering plants in the rush family Juncaceae. The genus has a cosmopolitan distribution, with species occurring throughout the world, especially in temperate regions, the Arctic, and higher elevation areas in the tropics. Plants of the genus are known commonly as wood-rush, wood rush, or woodrush. Possible origins of the genus name include the Italian lucciola ("to shine, sparkle") or the Latin luzulae or luxulae, from lux ("light"), inspired by the way the plants sparkle when wet with dew. Another etymology sometimes given is that it does derive from lucciola but that this meant a mid-summer field, or from the Latin luculus, meaning a small place; the same source also states that this name was applied by Luigi Anguillara (an Italian botanist) in 1561.

These rushes are usually perennial plants with rhizomes and sometimes stolons. They generally form clumps of cylindrical stems and narrow leaves with hair-lined edges. The inflorescence is often a dense cluster of flowers with two leaf-like bracts at the base, or sometimes a solitary flower or a few flowers borne together. They have six brownish tepals.

Luzula species are used as food plants by the larvae of some Lepidoptera species, including the smoky wainscot. Several moths of the genus Coleophora have been observed on the plants. Coleophora biforis and C. otidipennella feed exclusively on Luzula. C. antennariella is limited to Luzula pilosa, and C. sylvaticella feeds only on L. sylvatica.

Some species, notably Luzula sylvatica and its cultivars, are used as ornamental garden plants.

== Species ==
125 species are accepted.

- Luzula abchasica Novikov
- Luzula abyssinica Parl.
- Luzula acuminata Raf.
- Luzula acutifolia H. Nordensk.
- Luzula africana Drège ex Steud.
- Luzula alopecurus Desv.
- Luzula alpestris H. Nordensk.
- Luzula alpina Hoppe
- Luzula alpinopilosa (Chaix) Breistr.
- Luzula antarctica Hook. f.
- Luzula arcuata (Wahlenb.) Sw.
- Luzula atlantica Braun-Blanq.
- Luzula atrata Edgar
- Luzula australasica Steud.
- Luzula banksiana E. Mey.
- Luzula × bogdanii Kirschner
- Luzula bomiensis K. F. Wu
- Luzula × bornmuelleriana Kük.
- Luzula × borreri Bromf. ex Bab.
- Luzula brachyphylla Phil.
- Luzula brevispicata Knjaz.
- Luzula bulbosa (Alph. Wood) Smyth & L.C.R.Smyth
- Luzula caespitosa (E. Mey.) Steud.
- Luzula calabra Ten.
- Luzula campestris (L.) DC.
- Luzula canariensis Poir.
- Luzula capitata (Miq. ex Franch. & Sav.) Kom.
- Luzula caricina E.Mey.
- Luzula celata Edgar
- Luzula chilensis Nees & Meyen ex Kunth
- Luzula colensoi Hook.f.
- Luzula comosa E. Mey.
- Luzula confusa Lindeb.
- Luzula congesta (Thuill.) Lej.
- Luzula crenulata Buchenau
- Luzula crinita Hook. f.
- Luzula × danica H. Nordensk. & Kirschner
- Luzula decipiens Edgar
- Luzula densiflora (H.Nordensk.) Edgar
- Luzula denticulata Liebm.
- Luzula desvauxii Kunth
- Luzula divaricata S.Watson
- Luzula divulgata Kirschner
- Luzula divulgatiformis Bačič & Jogan
- Luzula echinata (Small) F.J.Herm.
- Luzula ecuadoriensis Balslev
- Luzula effusa Buchenau
- Luzula elegans Lowe
- Luzula excelsa Buchenau
- Luzula exspectata Bačič & Jogan
- Luzula fallax Kirschner
- Luzula × favratii K.Richt.
- Luzula flaccida (Buchenau) Edgar
- Luzula formosana Ohwi
- Luzula forsteri (Sm.) DC.
- Luzula × gayana Font Quer & Rothm.
- Luzula gigantea Desv.
- Luzula glabrata (Hoppe) Desv.
- Luzula groenlandica Böcher
- Luzula × hasleri Murr
- Luzula hawaiiensis Buchenau
- Luzula × heddae Kirschner
- Luzula × hermannii-muelleri Asch. & Graebn.
- Luzula hitchcockii Hämet-Ahti
- Luzula × hybrida H. Lindb. ex Kirschner
- Luzula ignivoma Kirschner
- Luzula inaequalis K.F.Wu
- Luzula indica Kirschner
- Luzula jimboi Miyabe & Kudo
- Luzula × johannis-principis Murr
- Luzula johnstonii Buchenau
- Luzula kjellmaniana Miyabe & Kudo
- Luzula kobayasii Satake
- Luzula lactea (Link) E.Mey.
- Luzula leiboldii Buchenau
- Luzula leptophylla Buchenau & Petrie
- Luzula × levieri Asch. & Graebn.
- Luzula longiflora Benth.
- Luzula lutea (All.) DC.
- Luzula lutescens (Koidz.) Kirschner & Miyam.
- Luzula luzulina (Vill.) Racib.
- Luzula luzuloides (Lam.) Dandy & Wilmott
- Luzula mannii (Buchenau) Kirschner & Cheek
- Luzula masafuerana Skottsb.
- Luzula mauretanica (Maire & Trab.) Rivas Mart., Molero Mesa, Marfíl & G.Benítez
- Luzula × media Kirschner
- Luzula mendocina Barros
- Luzula meridionalis H. Nordensk.
- Luzula modesta Buchenau
- Luzula multiflora (Ehrh.) Lej.
- Luzula muscosa Charit.
- Luzula nipponica (Satake) Kirschner & Miyam.
- Luzula nivalis (Laest.) Spreng.
- Luzula nivea (Nathh.) DC.
- Luzula nodulosa E. Mey.
- Luzula novae-cambriae Gand.
- Luzula odaesanensis Y.N.Lee & Chae ex M.Kim
- Luzula oligantha Sam.
- Luzula orestera Sharsm.
- Luzula ostenii (Mattf.) Herter
- Luzula ovata Edgar
- Luzula pallescens Sw.
- Luzula papuana M. E. Jansen
- Luzula parviflora (Ehrh.) Desv.
- Luzula pedemontana Boiss. & Reut.
- Luzula pediformis (Chaix) DC.
- Luzula peruviana Desv.
- Luzula × pfaffii Murr
- Luzula philippinensis M. E. Jansen
- Luzula picta A. Rich.
- Luzula pilosa (L.) Willd.
- Luzula pindica (Hausskn.) Chrtek & Krísa
- Luzula piperi (Coville) M. E. Jones
- Luzula plumosa E. Mey.
- Luzula poimena W. M. Curtis
- Luzula pumila Hook. f.
- Luzula purpureosplendens Seub.
- Luzula racemosa Desv.
- Luzula × romanica J. Dvorák & Vorel
- Luzula rufa Edgar
- Luzula rufescens Fisch. ex E. Mey.
- Luzula ruiz-lealii Barros
- Luzula seubertii Lowe
- Luzula × sichuanensis K. F. Wu
- Luzula × somedana Fern-Carv. & Fern. Prieto
- Luzula spicata (L.) DC.
- Luzula stenophylla Steud.
- Luzula subcapitata (Rydb.) H. D. Harr.
- Luzula subcongesta (S. Watson) Jeps.
- Luzula subsessilis (S. Watson) Buchenau
- Luzula sudetica (Willd.) Schult.
- Luzula sylvatica (Huds.) Gaudin
- Luzula taiwaniana Satake
- Luzula taurica (V. I. Krecz.) Novikov
- Luzula traversii (Buchenau) Cheeseman
- Luzula tristachya Desv.
- Luzula ulei Buchenau
- Luzula ulophylla (Buchenau) Cockayne & Laing
- Luzula × vinesii Murr
- Luzula vulcanica Liebm.
- Luzula wahlenbergii Rupr.
- Luzula × wettsteinii Buchenau
- Luzula × winderiae Murr
