= Hairy woodrush =

Hairy woodrush may refer to

- Luzula acuminata, a plant in North America
- Luzula pilosa, a plant in Europe and West Asia
