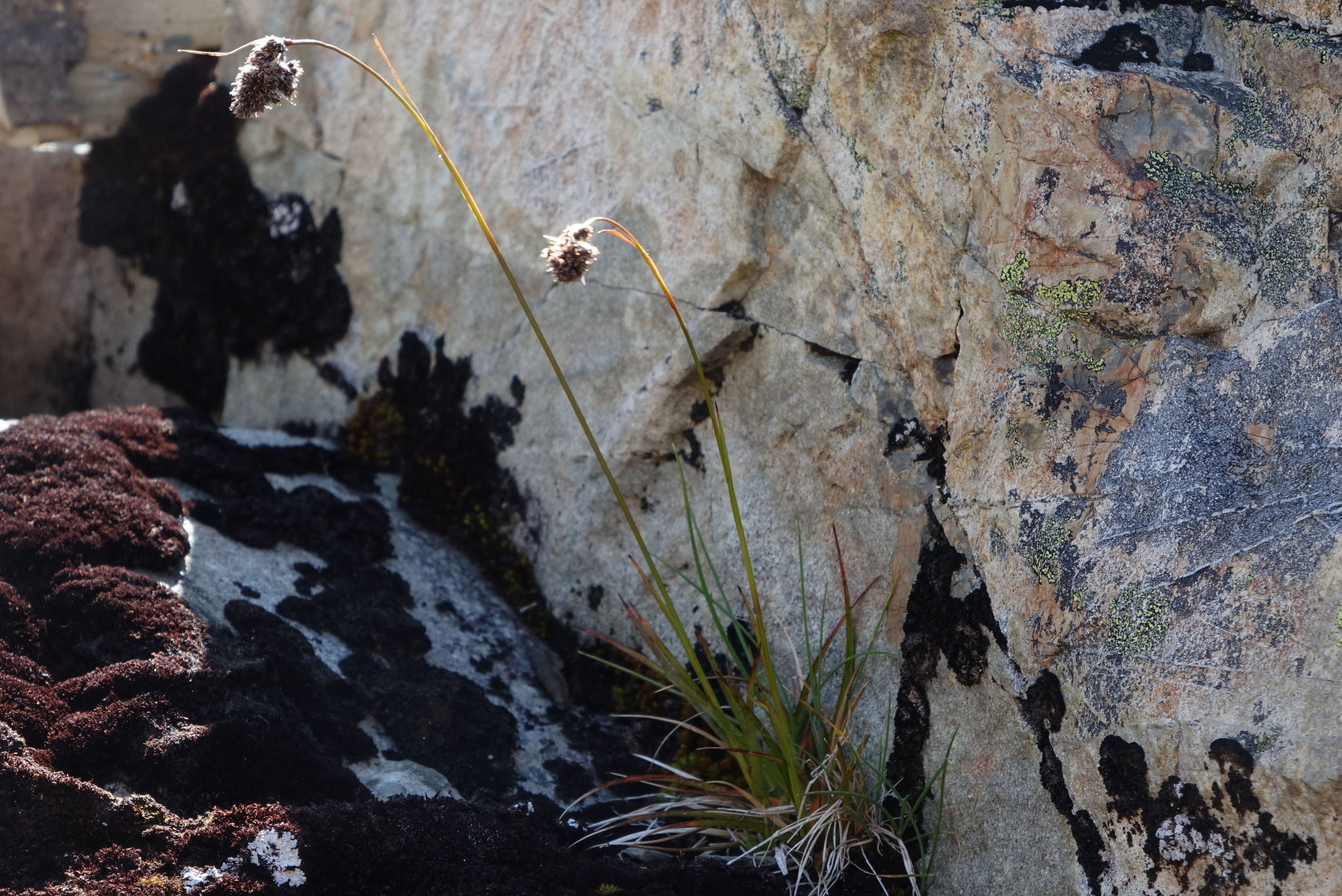

Scientific classification
- Kingdom: Plantae
- Clade: Tracheophytes
- Clade: Angiosperms
- Clade: Monocots
- Clade: Commelinids
- Order: Poales
- Family: Juncaceae
- Genus: Luzula
- Species: L. traversii

Binomial name
- Luzula traversii (Buchenau) Cheeseman, 1925

= Luzula traversii =

Species of flowering plant

Luzula traversii is a species of flowering plant in the rush family Juncaceae. It is native to New Zealand.

== Description ==
Thomas Cheeseman published this description posthumously in 1925 (measurements converted to metric):

Stems densely tufted, very variable in size, usually from 6–12 in (150–300 mm), but sometimes attaining 18 in. and occasionally dwarfed to 4 in (100 mm), slender, often attenuate above. Leaves radical and a few cauline, all much shorter than the stem, 1–6 in (25–152 mm) long, rarely more, 0.1–0.25 in (2.5–6.4 mm) broad at the base and from thence gradually tapering upwards, apex subulate, not obtuse as in the forms of L. campestris; margins flat or involute, ciliate with long hairs. Inflorescence terminal, erect or nodding, compound, of several short and dense spikes either all congested into an ovoid head, or the lower 1 to 3 distinct and sometimes peduncled. Lower bracts foliaceous, often overtopping the inflorescence; upper membranous, with very broad white margins and apices, densely ciliate with long hairs. Flowers small, 0.1 in (2.5 mm) long. Perianth-segments equal, or the outer slightly longer, lanceolate, awned, pale-chestnut with white and silvery margins. Stamens 3, rarely more. Capsule equalling the perianth, ovoid-globose, trigonous, mucronate, pale- or dark-chestnut, sometimes almost black. Seeds oblong-ovoid, ferruginous.

The species can be distinguished from Luzula campestris by its tapering leaves that end in a distinct point.

== Distribution ==
Luzula traversii is native to the South Island of New Zealand.
