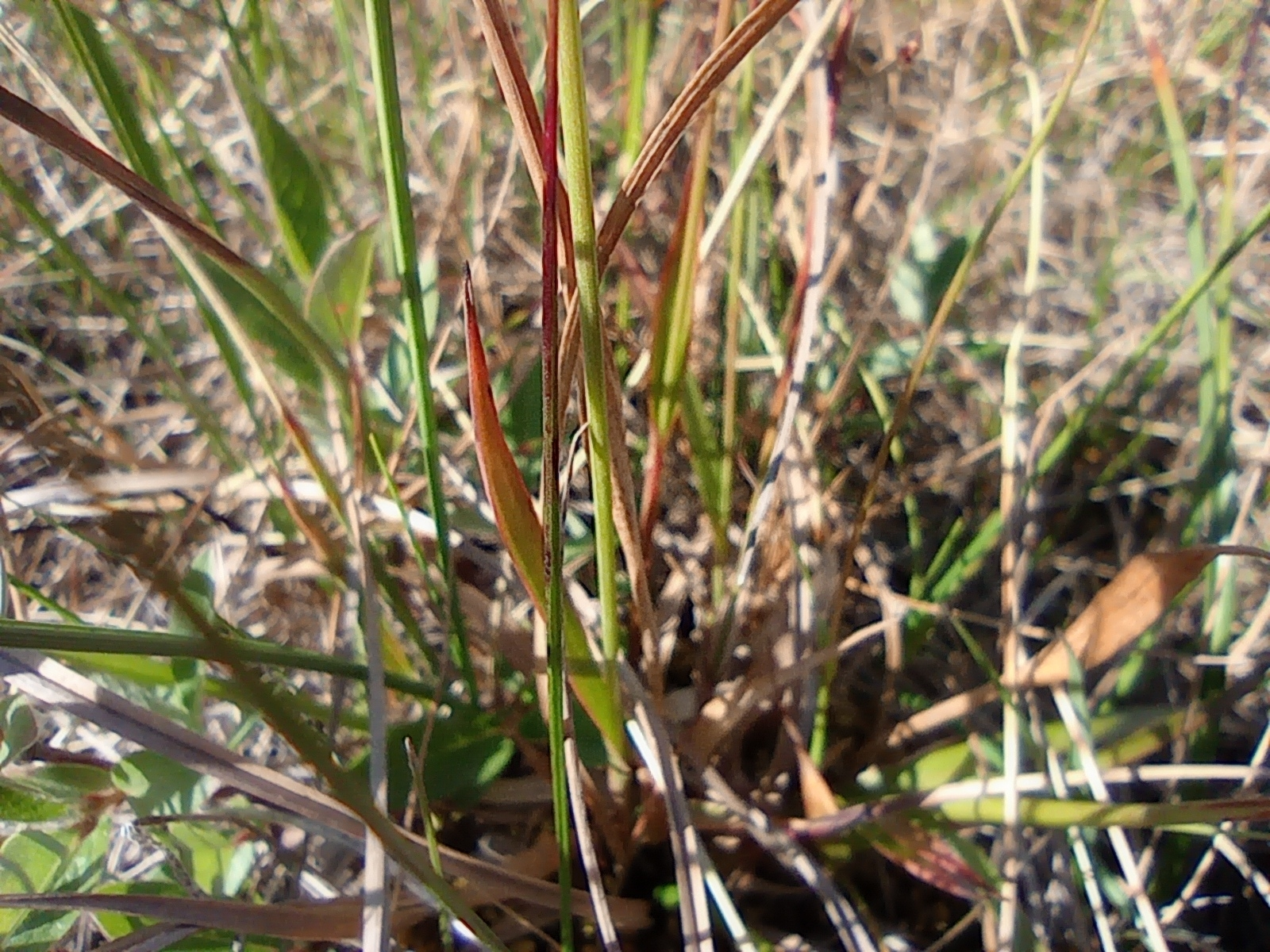

Scientific classification
- Kingdom: Plantae
- Clade: Tracheophytes
- Clade: Angiosperms
- Clade: Monocots
- Clade: Commelinids
- Order: Poales
- Family: Juncaceae
- Genus: Luzula
- Species: L. wahlenbergii

Binomial name
- Luzula wahlenbergii Rupr.

Synonyms
- Luzula borealis Fr.; Luzula spadicea var. kunthii E.Mey.; Luzula spadicea var. wahlenbergii (Rupr.) Buchenau

= Luzula wahlenbergii =

Species of flowering plant in the rush family

Luzula wahlenbergii, commonly known as Wahlenberg's woodrush or reindeer wood-rush, is a perennial species of plant in the genus Luzula of the (rush) family Juncaceae.

== Taxonomy and naming ==
Luzula wahlenbergii is in the section Diprophyllatae of the genus Luzula of the (rush) family Juncaceae. L. wahlenbergii was first formally described by the Austro-Russian botanist Franz Josef Ruprecht in 1845.

With regards to the etymology of the binomial: the generic name Luzula could come from the Italian lucciola ("to shine, sparkle") or the Latin luzulae or luxulae, from lux ("light"), inspired by the way the plant's hairs sparkle when wet with dew. Another etymology sometimes given is that it does derive from lucciola but that this meant a midsummerfield, or from the Latin luculus, meaning a small place; the same source also states that this name was applied by Luigi Anguillara (an Italian botanist) in 1561. The second part of the binomial, wahlenbergii is in tribute to the Swedish botanist Göran Wahlenberg, who studied the flora of the northernmost areas of Sweden.

== Description ==
Luzula wahlenbergii is herbaceous perennial plant that grows in loose tufts to a height of around 15–35 cm (5.9–13.8 in). It is almost hairless. Its leaves have very small serrations at the edges and taper to a point. Leaves at the base of the stem are 5–10 cm (2.0–3.9 in) long by 3–5 mm (0.12–0.20 in) wide. There may be one or two leaves higher up the stem, 3–5 cm (1.2–2.0 in) by 2–4 mm (0.079–0.157 in).

The plant's inflorescence has been described by eMonocot as a "lax nodding panicle". Measuring 4 cm × 3 cm (1.6 in × 1.2 in), it bears 10–30 flowers, with between one and three to a stem. The lower bracts are 4–10 mm (0.16–0.39 in) long, and there are shorter bracteoles and brown, pointed tepals. Each flower has six stamens. Pointed brown ellipsoidal seed capsules up to 2.4 mm (0.094 in) in length hold the dark chestnut-brown ellipsoidal seeds.

== Distribution and habitat ==
Luzula wahlenbergii has a relatively wide distribution, growing across Arctic Eurasia, far-east Russia (including Transbaikal), Alaska, Greenland, Canada and the mountains of Scandinavia.

Luzula wahlenbergii is an arctic–alpine plant, and grows in mainly moist habitats. These include, but are not limited to, wet grasslands, mossy tundra, the shores of lakes, alluvial rivers, gneissic seashore and alpine creeks.
