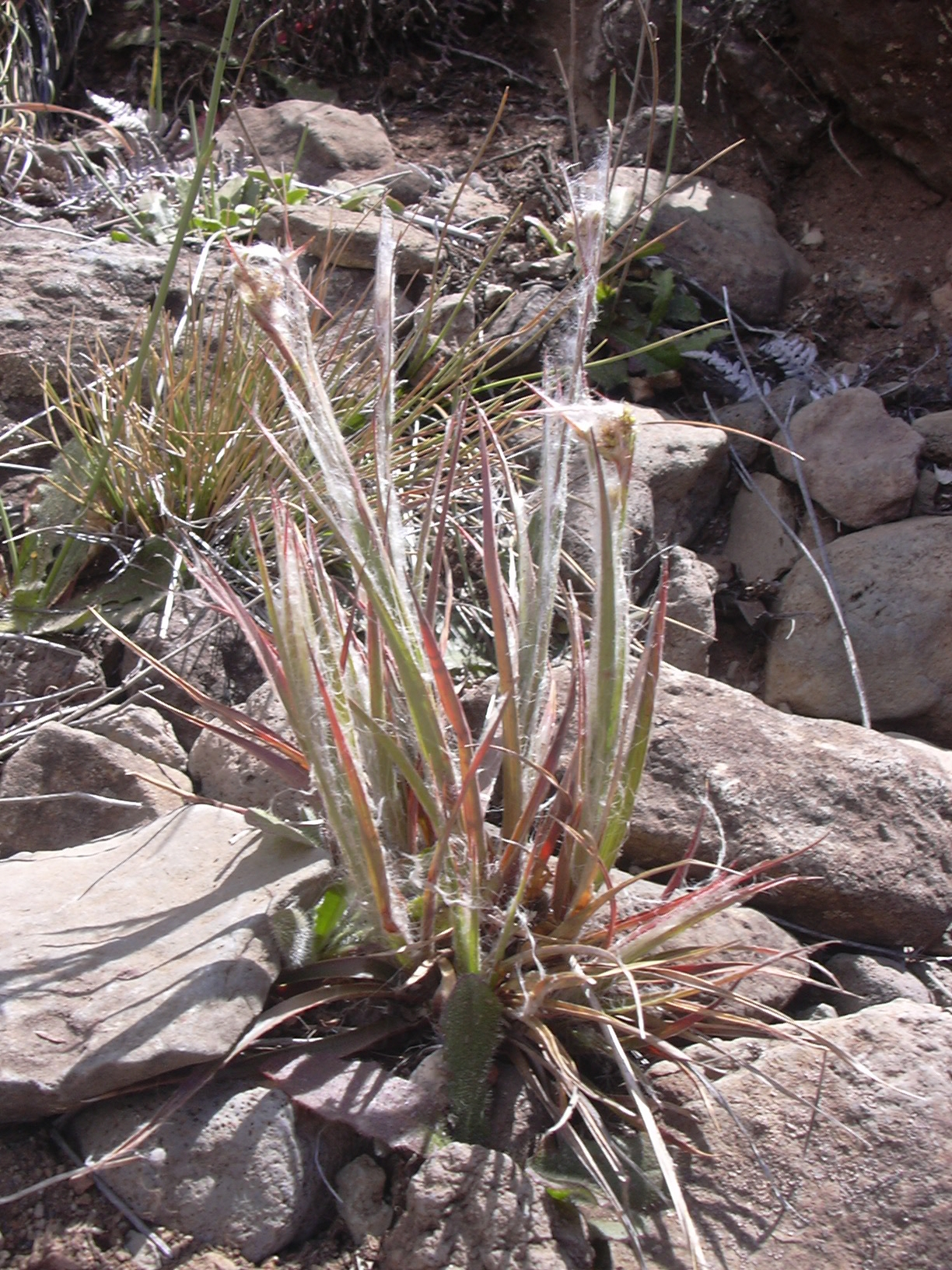

Conservation status
- Vulnerable (NatureServe)

Scientific classification
- Kingdom: Plantae
- Clade: Embryophytes
- Clade: Tracheophytes
- Clade: Spermatophytes
- Clade: Angiosperms
- Clade: Monocots
- Clade: Commelinids
- Order: Poales
- Family: Juncaceae
- Genus: Luzula
- Species: L. hawaiiensis

Binomial name
- Luzula hawaiiensis Buchenau

= Luzula hawaiiensis =

Species of flowering plant in the rush family

Luzula hawaiiensis, commonly known as Hawai'i wood-rush, Wood rush or the Hawaii Wood Rush, is a species of perennial plant in Juncaceae (Rush family) family that is endemic to Hawaii. L hawaiiensis lives in rocky areas, slopes, cliffs, ridges, grasslands, shrub lands etc. This species can grow to a height of 71.12 centimeters (28 inches) tall. This species is Vulnerable.

== Variants ==
This species has several varieties list are listed below:

- Luzula hawaiiensis var. hawaiiensis
- Luzula hawaiiensis var. glabrata
- Luzula hawaiiensis var. oahuensis
