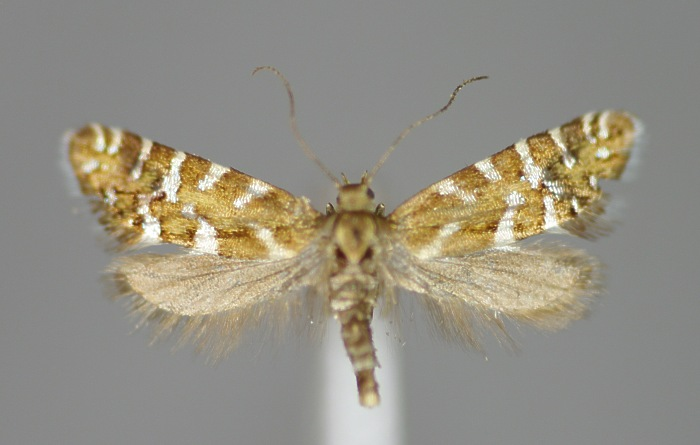

Scientific classification
- Kingdom: Animalia
- Phylum: Arthropoda
- Clade: Pancrustacea
- Class: Insecta
- Order: Lepidoptera
- Family: Glyphipterigidae
- Genus: Glyphipterix
- Species: G. bergstraesserella

Binomial name
- Glyphipterix bergstraesserella (Fabricius, 1781)

Synonyms
- Tinea bergstraesserella Fabricius, 1781; Glyphipterix pietruskii Nowicki, 1864; Glyphipterix altioriella Bauer, 1923; Phalaena Tinea linneella Linnaeus, 1790; Tinea lineella Hübner, [1796]; Tortrix lineana Hübner, [1796]; Glyphipterix linneana Hübner, [1825]; Glyphipterix linneella Hübner, [1825]; Tortrix treitschkeana Frölich, 1828; Glyphipteryx bergstraesserella ab. arcuatella Klemensiewicz, 1907

= Glyphipterix bergstraesserella =

Species of moth

Glyphipterix bergstraesserella is a moth of the family Glyphipterigidae. It is found in most of Europe, except Ireland, Great Britain, the Netherlands, Portugal, most of the Balkan Peninsula and Ukraine.

The wingspan is 10–15 mm. Adults are on wing from May to July and in October.

The larvae feed on Luzula luzuloides. They bore the stem of their host plant.
