= Burgate Wood =

Site of Special Scientific Interest in Suffolk, England

Coordinates: 52.341°N 1.046°E

- Site of Special Scientific Interest
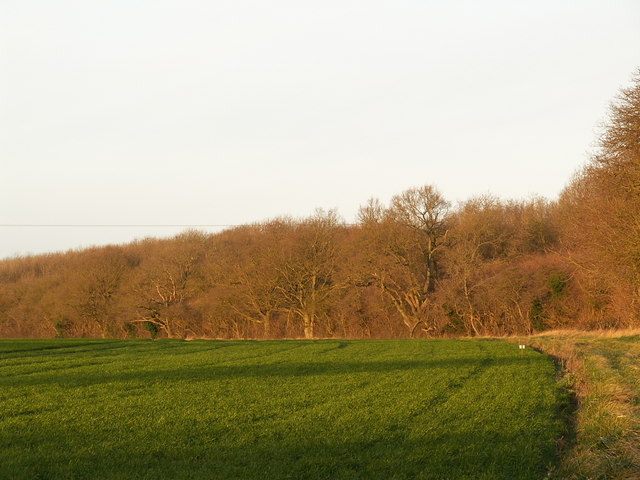
- Location of Burgate Wood.
- Area of search: Suffolk
- Grid reference: TM 075 757
- Interest: Biological
- Area: 29.9 hectares
- Notification date: 1987
- Location map: Magic Map

Burgate Wood is a 29.9-hectare (74-acre) biological Site of Special Scientific Interest in Suffolk. The site includes a medieval ringwork which is a Scheduled Monument.

This is ancient coppice with standards oak and hornbeam woodland. The flora is diverse, including the rare lungwort and the uncommon herb paris, yellow archangel and hairy woodrush.

The site is private land with no public access.
