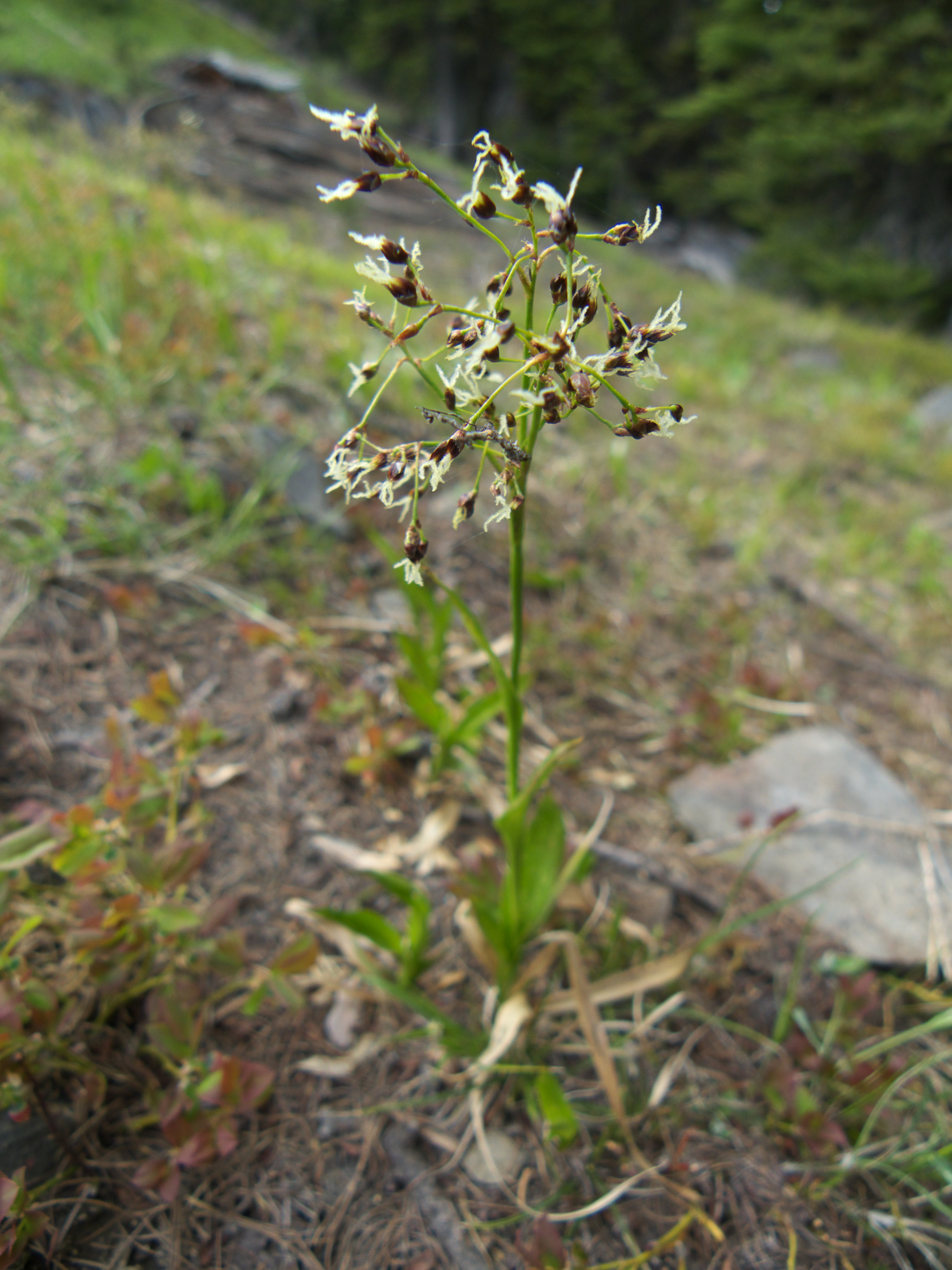

Scientific classification
- Kingdom: Plantae
- Clade: Tracheophytes
- Clade: Angiosperms
- Clade: Monocots
- Clade: Commelinids
- Order: Poales
- Family: Juncaceae
- Genus: Luzula
- Species: L. hitchcockii

Binomial name
- Luzula hitchcockii Hämet-Ahti

= Luzula hitchcockii =

Species of flowering plant in the rush family

Luzula hitchcockii is a species of flowering plant in the rush family known by the common names smooth woodrush and Hitchcock's wood rush. It is native to western North America from British Columbia and Alberta to Oregon to Wyoming. It is sometimes treated as a variety of Luzula glabrata.

This rhizomatous perennial rush produces rounded, hollow stems up to 50 centimeters tall. The shiny, red-tipped leaves are a few centimeters long. The inflorescence contains solitary or paired flowers with small reddish or brown tepals. The fruit is a reddish-brown capsule which contains 3 seeds. This plant often forms large colonies. It forms a thick mat that may prevent other plants from sprouting up.

This rush grows in the understory of stands of subalpine fir (Abies lasiocarpa), mountain hemlock (Tsuga mertensiana), and subalpine larch (Larix lyallii) in subalpine and alpine climates. It occurs in high elevation habitats with long-lasting snowpack. It is an indicator of cold sites with late-melting snow. Other understory species occurring with the rush include grouse whortleberry (Vaccinium scoparium), Sitka valerian (Valeriana sitchensis), mountain arnica (Arnica latifolia), and menziesia (Menziesia ferruginea).

This rush occurs in a habitat with 13 plants that provide food for grizzly bears. Caribou sometimes give birth in stands of the rush.
