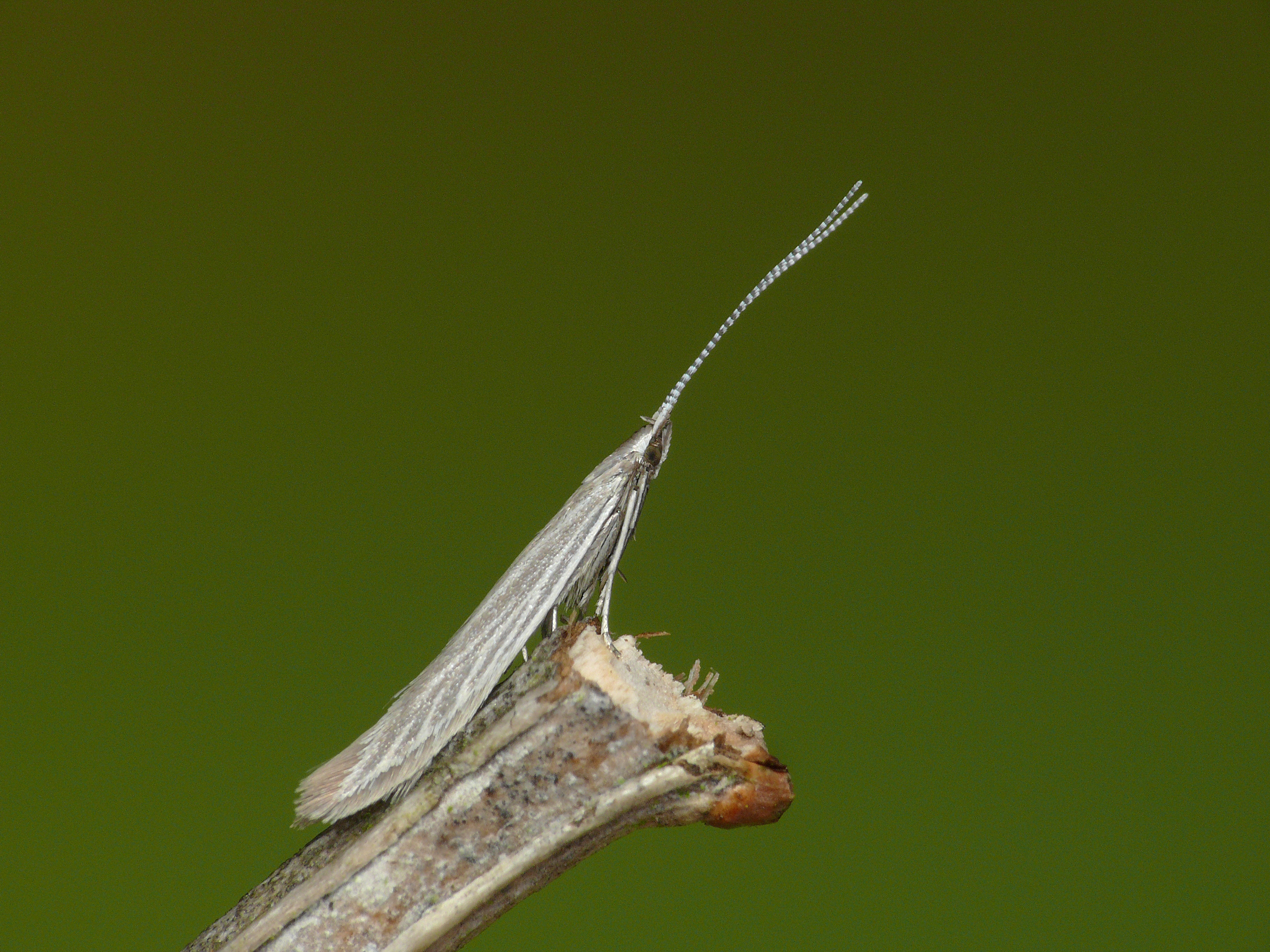

Scientific classification
- Kingdom: Animalia
- Phylum: Arthropoda
- Class: Insecta
- Order: Lepidoptera
- Family: Coleophoridae
- Genus: Coleophora
- Species: C. otidipennella

Binomial name
- Coleophora otidipennella (Hübner, 1817)

Synonyms
- List: Tinea otidipennella Hübner, 1817; Ornix murinipennella Duponchel, 1844; Perygra murinipennella

= Coleophora otidipennella =

Species of moth

Coleophora otidipennella is a moth of the family Coleophoridae found in Asia and Europe.

== Description ==
The wingspan is 10–12 mm. Coleophora species have narrow blunt to pointed forewings and a weakly defined tornus. The hindwings are narrow-elongate and very long-fringed. The upper surfaces have neither a discal spot nor transverse lines. Each abdomen segment of the abdomen has paired patches of tiny spines which show through the scales. The resting position is horizontal with the front end raised and the cilia give the hind tip a frayed and upturned look if the wings are rolled around the body. C. otidipennella characteristics include greyish appearance streaked with whitish-cream.It can only be reliably identified by dissection and microscopic examination of the genitalia.

Adults are on wing from May to June.

The larvae feed on the seeds of rushes (Luzula species), including field wood-rush (Luzula campestris) and common woodrush (Luzula multiflora). The larvae form a whitish or yellowish case.

== Distribution ==
It is found in most of Europe, the Near East, and the eastern Palearctic realm.
