= Luzula nivalis =

Scientific classification
- Kingdom: Plantae
- Clade: Embryophytes
- Clade: Tracheophytes
- Clade: Spermatophytes
- Clade: Angiosperms
- Clade: Monocots
- Clade: Commelinids
- Order: Poales
- Family: Juncaceae
- Genus: Luzula
- Species: L. nivalis

Binomial name
- Luzula nivalis (Laest.) Spreng.

Synonyms
- Juncoides arcticum (Blytt) Coville; Juncoides nivalis (Laest.) Coville; Juncus campestris var. nivalis (Laest.) Sommerf.; Luzula arcuata var. hookeriana Trautv.; Luzula arctica Blytt; Luzula campestris var. nivalis Laest.; Luzula tolmatchewii Kuvaev

Species of flowering plant in the rush family

Luzula nivalis, commonly known as arctic wood-rush or less commonly as snowy wood-rush (both names are used with or without hyphenation), is a species of perennial rush native to the North American Arctic and Northern Europe. It was described by Polunin (1940) as one of the most abundant, ubiquitous, and ecologically important of all arctic plants.

== Taxonomy and naming ==
Luzula nivalis is classified under the section Thyrsanochlamydeae of the subgenus Luzula. It belongs to the genus Luzula of the rush family Juncaceae. With regards to the etymology of the binomial: the generic name Luzula could come from the Italian lucciola ("to shine, sparkle") or the Latin luzulae or luxulae, from lux ("light"), inspired by the way the plant's hairs sparkle when wet with dew. Nivalis is Latin for snowy, snow-covered or snow-like.

The exact taxonomy of Luzula nivalis is a little confusing due to confusions over the naming of the taxon; the name L. arctica has frequently (though less occasionally in recent years) been applied this taxon, or it has been regarded as a separate species altogether. Elven et al. (2003) stated that "a number of authors (Hultén 1968, Böcher et al. 1968, Porsild and Cody 1980, Novikov 1990) have considered L. nivalis to be conspecific with L. arctica, but some of them (Hultén 1968, Böcher et al. 1968) have used the name L. arctica, while the others (Porsild and Cody 1980...) [have used] the correct name L. nivalis.". Elven et al. (2003) also noted that L. campestris var. nivalis was widely considered to be conspecific with L. arctica. The current botanical consensus seems to be that lectotypification solves the issue and that L. arctica and L. nivalis should be regarded as the same species, with the name L. nivalis being chosen as this (derived from L. campestris var. nivalis) is the species's basionym and was used before L. arctica.

== Description ==
Luzula nivalis is a relatively small perennial herbaceous plant (or "herb") which grows to heights of between 2.5–25 centimetres (0.98–9.8 in) in a caespitose fashion. L. nivalis has fibrous roots and ascending rhizomes, older plants have vertical stems either at ground level or underground; the plant base is straw-brown/pale castaneous brown in colour. The plant is subglabrous with erect, aerial stems and numerous alternate basal leaves. These crowded leaves are marcescent, flat, remain for many years, usually up to 5 centimetres (2.0 in) long and 3–4 millimetres (0.12–0.16 in) wide. L. nivalis also has 1–2 cauline leaves which are 1–2 centimetres (0.4–0.8 in) long; both leaf types are grass-like, flat, linear, straight and possess parallel veins. The leaf tips are obtuse, acuminate, involute, caducous and slightly swollen. Both the blade adaxial and abaxial surfaces are glabrous, with sparse, white, non-glandular hairs along the blade margins.

The inflorescence of Luzula nivalis is congested in a single, dark, many-flowered head 0.8–1.0 × 0.6–0.9 cm in size; between 5–60 small flowers can be found in each inflorescence. This in turn is made up of 2–7 compact clusters, with the basal cluster sometimes on a 3 centimetres (1.2 in) long erecto-patent peduncle. The colour of the subglabrous, linear-lanceolate lower bract ranges from straw-brown to scarious; this bract is much shorter than the inflorescence at a length of 4–9 millimetres (0.16–0.35 in). No pedicels are present. The dark brown bracteoles are ovate, obtuse and sparsely ciliate above with either dentate or lacerate margins, reaching a length of up to 1.2 millimetres (0.047 in). L. nivalis has subequal and acute tepals 1.6–1.9 millimetres (0.063–0.075 in) long and castaneous to blackish brown in colour. The plant has six stamens as well as anthers 0.3–0.6 millimetres (0.012–0.024 in) long, filaments 0.4–0.5 millimetres (0.016–0.020 in) long, three styles 0.1–0.2 millimetres (0.0039–0.0079 in) long and stigmas 0.8–1.0 millimetre (0.031–0.039 in) long. L. nivalis produces an ovoid-trigonous seed capsule with exceeding tepals; capsule segments are blackish brown and 2.1–2.3 × c. 1.2 mm. The seeds themselves are ellipsoidal, smooth, brown and 1.0–1.2 × 0.6–0.7 mm in size. Basel appendages are fibrillate and up to 0.2 mm long. The fruit of L. nivalis is sessile and dry with a persistent and glabrous calyx.

The rosette-like whorl of short leaves in Luzula nivalis allows it to easily be distinguished from Luzula confusa.

== Distribution and habitat ==
Luzula nivalis has an arctic-alpine circumpolar distribution, as L. nivalis is an alpine plant which grows in the arctic regions of the northern hemisphere. Places which L. nivalis grows in include Norway, Sweden, Finland, Svalbard, Greenland, northern Canada, and Alaska in the United States, as well as the Munni river in Siberia.

Luzula nivalis has been found in a wide range of mainly moist habitats and substrates, including wet meadows, snow patches, seepages, along the margins of ponds, marshes, streams (and other water bodies) as well as tundra, slopes and ridges. Occasionally L. nivalis has been found on dry sites including gravel, sand, silt, clay, till.
