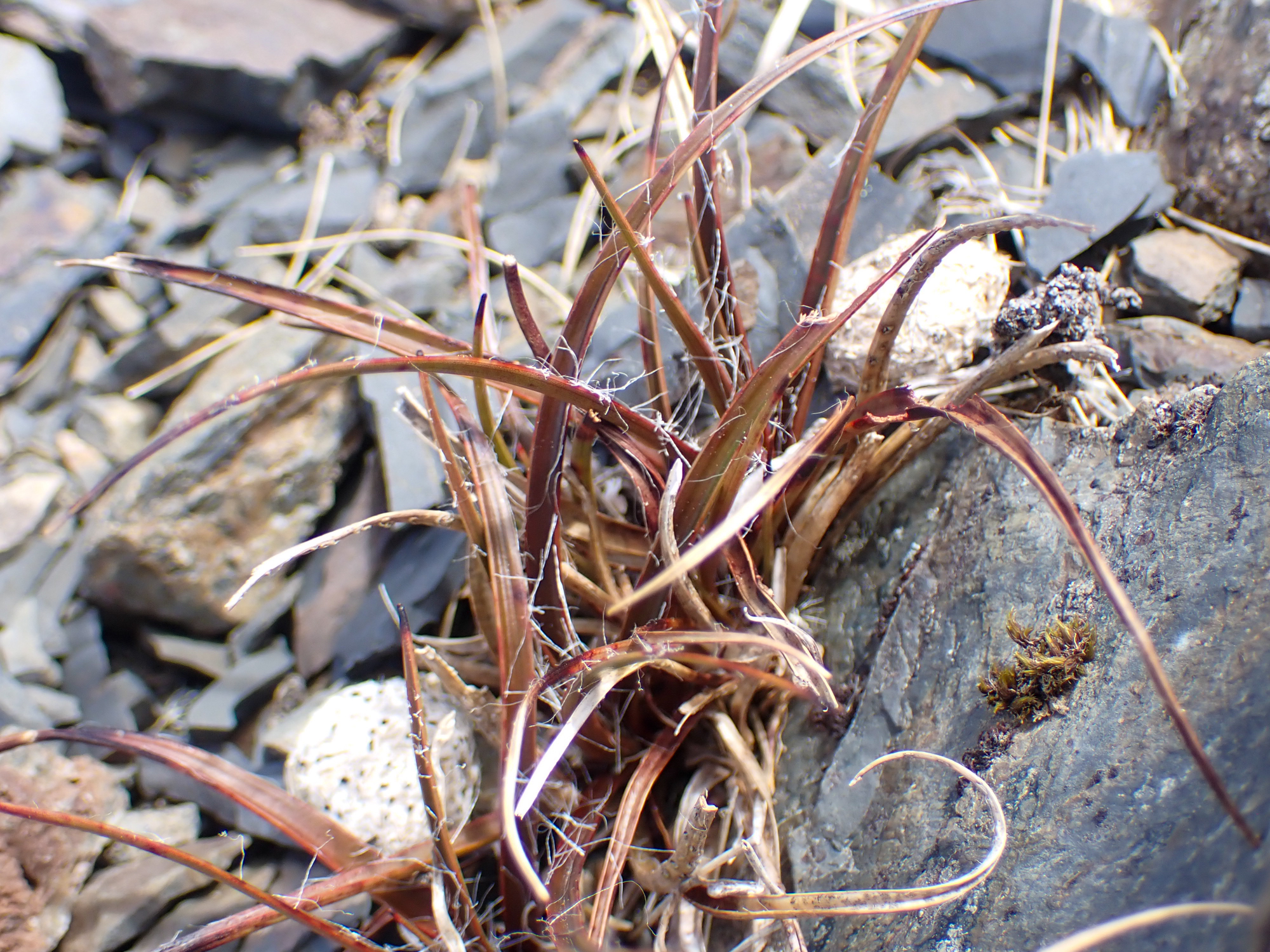
- Luzula rufa in Nelson Lakes National Park

Conservation status
- Not Threatened (NZ TCS)

Scientific classification
- Kingdom: Plantae
- Clade: Embryophytes
- Clade: Tracheophytes
- Clade: Angiosperms
- Clade: Monocots
- Clade: Commelinids
- Order: Poales
- Family: Juncaceae
- Genus: Luzula
- Species: L. rufa

Binomial name
- Luzula rufa Edgar

= Luzula rufa =

Species of flowering plant

Luzula rufa, or red woodrush, is a species of rush that is endemic to New Zealand.

== Description ==
Luzula rufa is perennial. Its growth pattern is scattered and grass-like, with long thin stems. The inflorescence is a single head, with one to three clusters. The tepals and the capsules are red brown, and get darker as the plant ages.

== Range and habitat ==
This plant grows across New Zealand on all three main islands and the Chatham Islands.

== Ecology ==
It grows together with Dracophyllum and Celmisia in alpine communities.

== Etymology ==
rufa is a reference to the colour of the plant, and means 'rusty'.

== Taxonomy ==
Luzula rufa contains the following varieties:

- Luzula rufa var. albicomans
- Luzula rufa var. rufa
