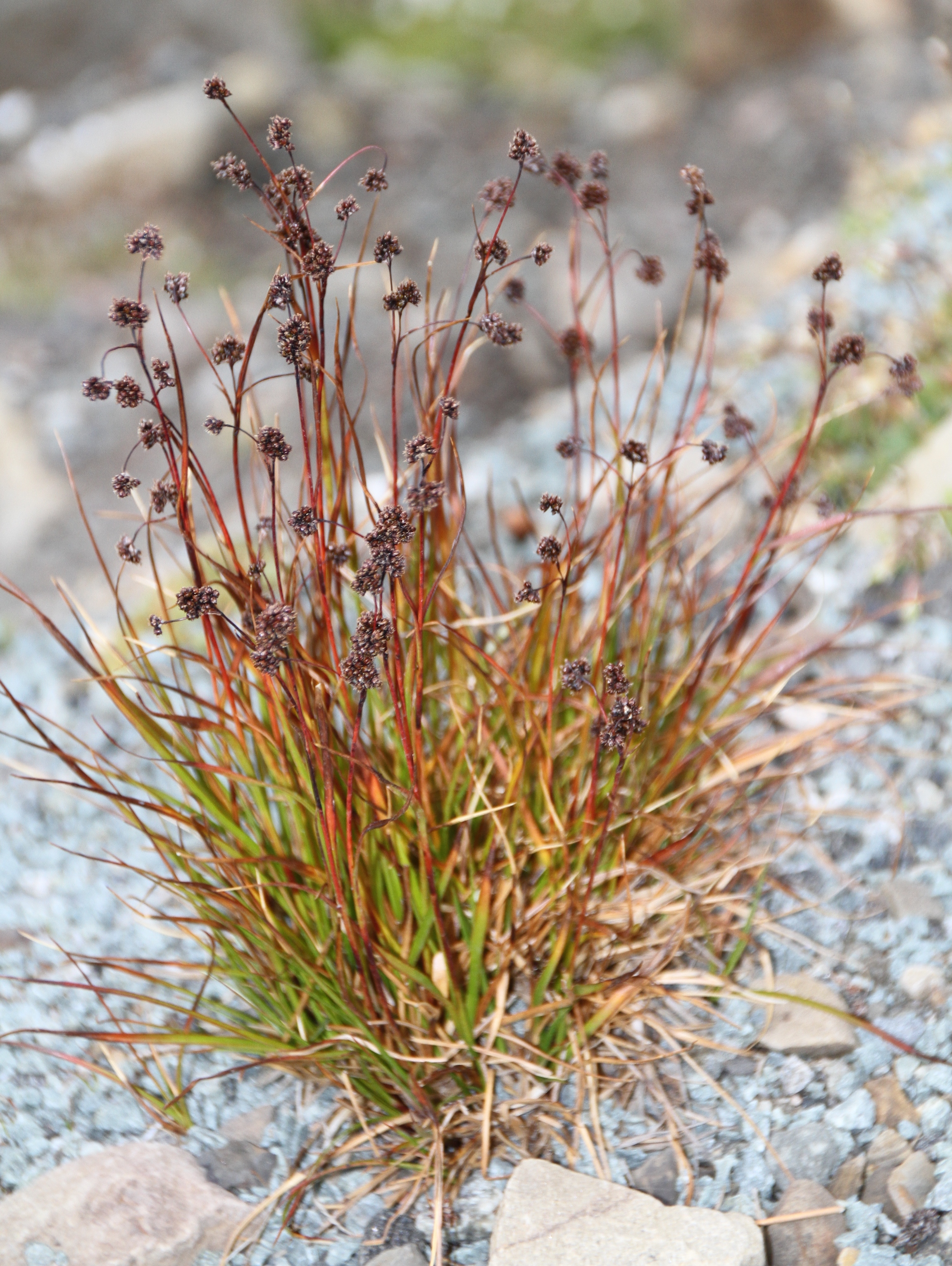

Scientific classification
- Kingdom: Plantae
- Clade: Embryophytes
- Clade: Tracheophytes
- Clade: Spermatophytes
- Clade: Angiosperms
- Clade: Monocots
- Clade: Commelinids
- Order: Poales
- Family: Juncaceae
- Genus: Luzula
- Species: L. arcuata

Binomial name
- Luzula arcuata Wahlenb.

= Luzula arcuata =

Species of flowering plant in the rush family

Luzula arcuata is a species of flowering plant in the rush family Juncaceae with the modern common name curved wood-rush (formerly curved mountain hair-rush). The plant is native to mountains of northern Europe, north-western and north-eastern Asia and north-western North America.

== Description ==
Luzula arcuata is a short (up to 10 cm), tufted, shortly rhizomatous, grass-like perennial herb. Leaves channelled, hairy. The longer flower stalks droop, curving downwards.

== Distribution ==
It has a very local distribution, confined to open ground and mountain summit plateaux above 1,250 metres (4,100 ft) that are sufficiently exposed to be kept snow-free. Its native distribution includes Iceland, Svalbard, northern Norway and Scottish mountains and mountains of Western North America and the Kamchatka peninsula.
