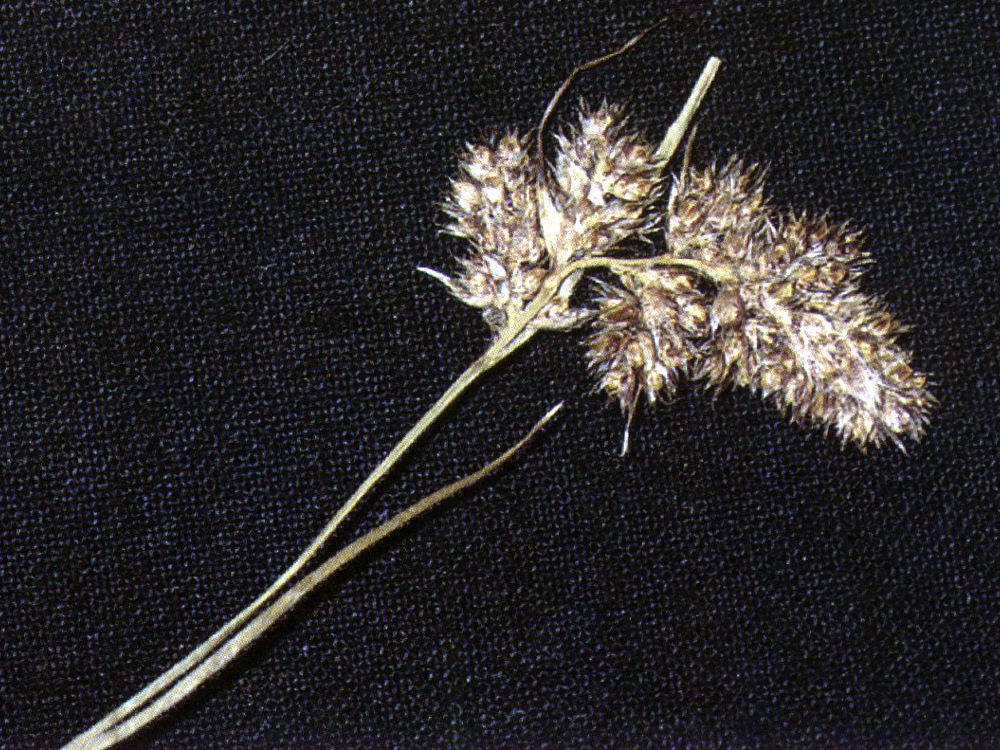

Scientific classification
- Kingdom: Plantae
- Clade: Embryophytes
- Clade: Tracheophytes
- Clade: Spermatophytes
- Clade: Angiosperms
- Clade: Monocots
- Clade: Commelinids
- Order: Poales
- Family: Juncaceae
- Genus: Luzula
- Species: L. spicata

Binomial name
- Luzula spicata (L.) DC.

Synonyms
- Juncus spicatus L.

= Luzula spicata =

Species of flowering plant in the rush family

Luzula spicata is a species of flowering plant in the rush family known by the common name spiked woodrush. It has a circumpolar distribution, occurring throughout the northern Hemisphere in Europe, Asia, and North America. It grows in subalpine and alpine climates. It occurs at low elevations in colder regions, such as tundra; further south it is restricted mainly to high mountains. It is a perennial herb forming grasslike clumps of several upright, reddish stems up to about 33 centimeters (13 in) in maximum height. The stem is thick and its base is buried several centimeters in the soil where it attaches to the roots. The inflorescence is an array of several clusters of brown bristle-tipped flowers. The surrounding bracts and the sheaths encircling the leaf bases are lined with hairs.
