= Luzula nodulosa =

Conservation status
- Least Concern (IUCN 3.1)

Scientific classification
- Kingdom: Plantae
- Clade: Embryophytes
- Clade: Tracheophytes
- Clade: Spermatophytes
- Clade: Angiosperms
- Clade: Monocots
- Clade: Commelinids
- Order: Poales
- Family: Juncaceae
- Genus: Luzula
- Species: L. nodulosa

Binomial name
- Luzula nodulosa E.Mey.

Synonyms
- Homotypic Synonyms: Juncoides nodulosa (E.Mey.) Kuntze; Juncus graecus Chaub. & Bory; Juncus nodulosus Bory & Chaub.; Luzula graeca (Chaub. & Bory) Kunth; Luzula nodulosa var. graeca (Chaub. & Bory) Maire

Species of grass

Luzula nodulosa is a species of flowering plant belonging to the family Juncaceae. Its native range is Northwestern Africa, Greece to Turkey.
