= Luzula piperi =

Scientific classification
- Kingdom: Plantae
- Clade: Embryophytes
- Clade: Tracheophytes
- Clade: Spermatophytes
- Clade: Angiosperms
- Clade: Monocots
- Clade: Commelinids
- Order: Poales
- Family: Juncaceae
- Genus: Luzula
- Species: L. piperi

Binomial name
- Luzula piperi (Coville) M.E.Jones

Synonyms
- Juncoides piperi Coville

Species of flowering plant in the rush family

Luzula piperi, commonly known as Piper's woodrush is a perennial species of plant in the genus Luzula of the (rush) family Juncaceae. Luzula piperi is native to northwestern North America and eastern Asia. It typically grows in moist forests and other shaded habitats.
