= Luzula canariensis =

Scientific classification
- Kingdom: Plantae
- Clade: Embryophytes
- Clade: Tracheophytes
- Clade: Spermatophytes
- Clade: Angiosperms
- Clade: Monocots
- Clade: Commelinids
- Order: Poales
- Family: Juncaceae
- Genus: Luzula
- Species: L. canariensis

Binomial name
- Luzula canariensis Poir.

Species of flowering plant in the rush family

Luzula canariensis is a plant species in the genus Luzula, family Juncaceae. It is endemic to the Canary Islands off the northwest coast of Africa. It is a perennial herb 35–90 centimetres (14–35 in) tall, with long grass-like leaves.
