= Coleophora antennariella =

Scientific classification
- Kingdom: Animalia
- Phylum: Arthropoda
- Class: Insecta
- Order: Lepidoptera
- Family: Coleophoridae
- Genus: Coleophora
- Species: C. antennariella

Binomial name
- Coleophora antennariella Herrich-Schaffer, 1861

Species of moth

Coleophora antennariella is a moth of the family Coleophoridae. It is found from Great Britain to Romania, Poland, the Baltic states and northern Russia and from Fennoscandia to France, Italy and Hungary.

The wingspan is 9.5–11 mm (0.37–0.43 in). Adults are on wing in May in one generation per year.

The larvae feed on the seeds of hairy wood-rush (Luzula pilosa) living in a moveable case.
