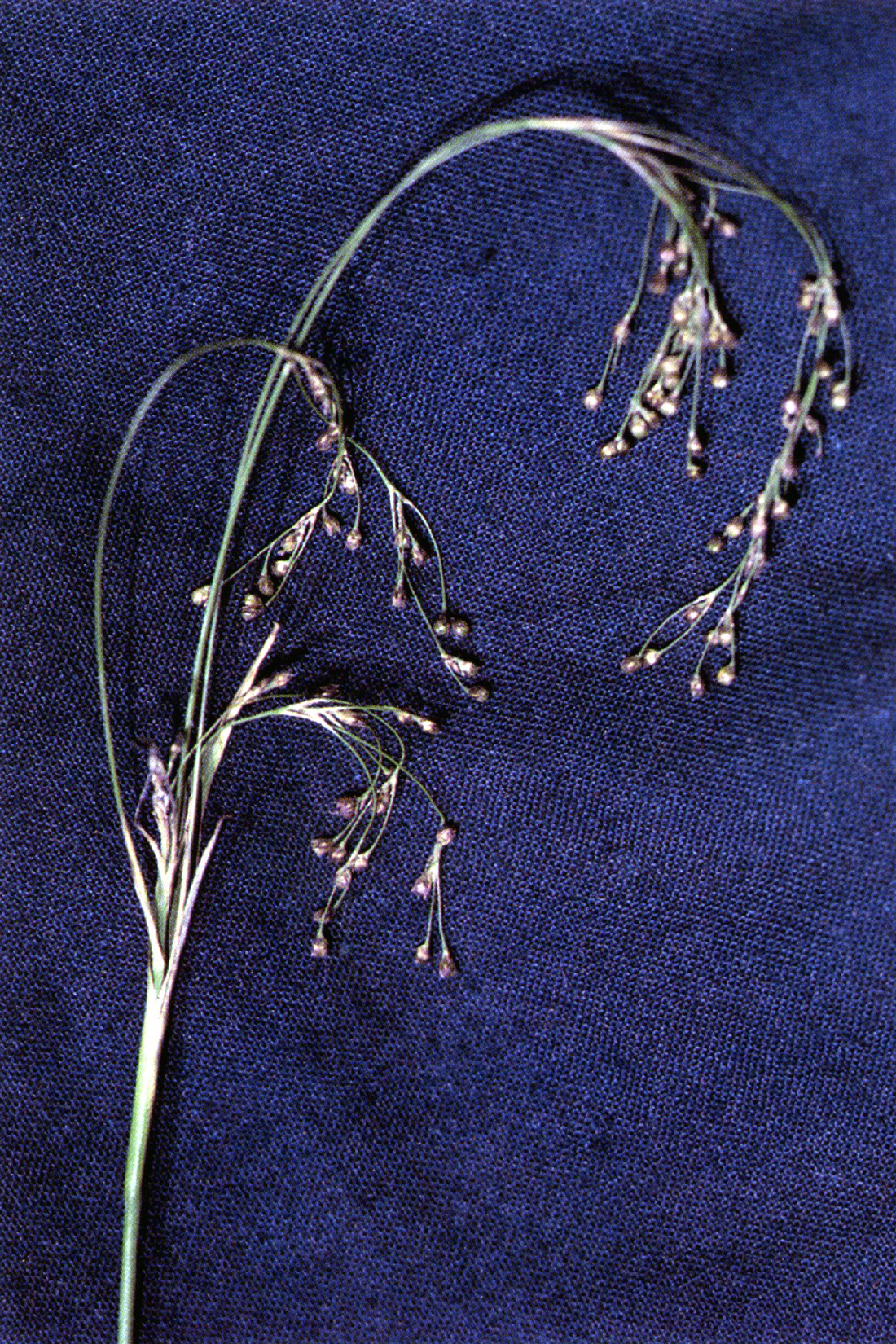

Scientific classification
- Kingdom: Plantae
- Clade: Embryophytes
- Clade: Tracheophytes
- Clade: Spermatophytes
- Clade: Angiosperms
- Clade: Monocots
- Clade: Commelinids
- Order: Poales
- Family: Juncaceae
- Genus: Luzula
- Species: L. parviflora

Binomial name
- Luzula parviflora (Ehrh.) Desv.

= Luzula parviflora =

Species of flowering plant in the rush family

Luzula parviflora is a species of flowering plant in the rush family known by the common name small-flowered woodrush. It has a northern circumboreal distribution.

== Description ==
It is a perennial herb forming grasslike clumps of several upright stems up to half a meter in maximum height surrounded by many grasslike leaves. The inflorescence is an open array of many clusters of brown flowers on long branches.

== Distribution ==
It has a circumboreal distribution, native throughout the Northern Hemisphere in northern Scandinavia, Asia and North America. It grows in moist areas, often on gravelly soils. It occurs at low elevations in colder regions, such as tundra; further south it is restricted mainly to high mountains. It can grow in highly disturbed habitat, as evidenced by its ability to survive volcanic eruption and to thrive in the destroyed ecosystem on the most barren slopes of Mount St. Helens.
