= Luzula longiflora =

Scientific classification
- Kingdom: Plantae
- Clade: Tracheophytes
- Clade: Angiosperms
- Clade: Monocots
- Clade: Commelinids
- Order: Poales
- Family: Juncaceae
- Genus: Luzula
- Species: L. longiflora

Binomial name
- Luzula longiflora Benth. (1878)

Synonyms
- Luzula campestris var. longiflora (Benth.) Kuntze (1891)

Species of flowering plant native to Australia

Luzula longiflora is a flowering plant in the rush family. The specific epithet refers to the relatively long floral perianth.

== Description ==
It is a herb, growing to 10–30 cm (3.9–12 in) in height. The tufted leaves are 5–35 cm (2.0–14 in) long and 4–5 mm wide. The inflorescences are 5–25 cm (2.0–9.8 in) high and branched, with dense heads of numerous flowers subtended by leaf-like bracts.

== Distribution and habitat ==
The plant is endemic to Australia’s subtropical Lord Howe Island in the Tasman Sea. It occurs on ledges and in crevices on the upper slopes of Mounts Lidgbird and Gower at the southern end of the island.
