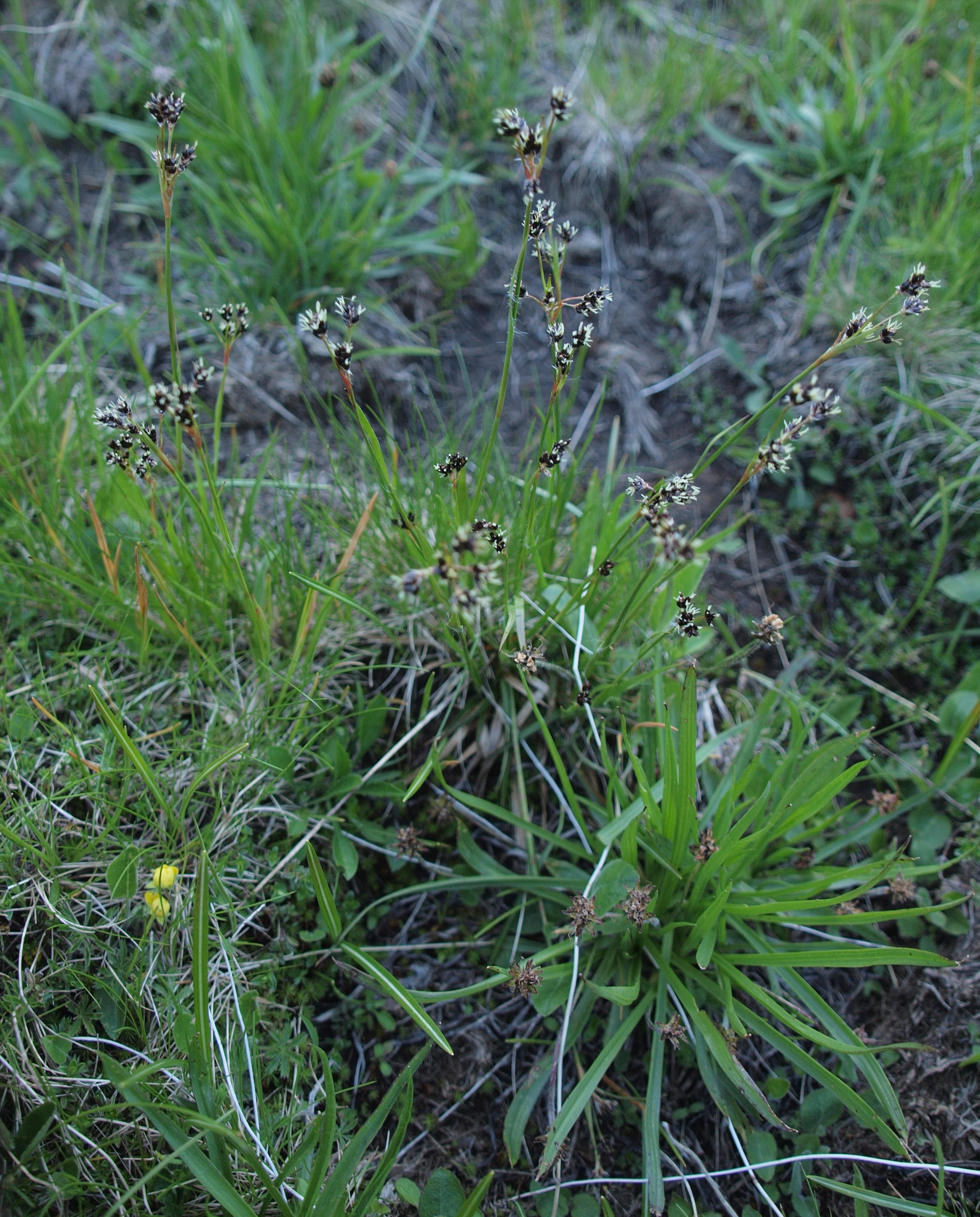

Scientific classification
- Kingdom: Plantae
- Clade: Tracheophytes
- Clade: Angiosperms
- Clade: Monocots
- Clade: Commelinids
- Order: Poales
- Family: Juncaceae
- Genus: Luzula
- Species: L. alpinopilosa

Binomial name
- Luzula alpinopilosa (Chaix) Breistr.

Synonyms
- Juncus alpinopilosus Chaix

= Luzula alpinopilosa =

Species of flowering plant

Luzula alpinopilosa, the alpine woodrush, is a species of rush in the Juncaceae family native to Europe.
