= Luzula subcongesta =

Scientific classification
- Kingdom: Plantae
- Clade: Embryophytes
- Clade: Tracheophytes
- Clade: Spermatophytes
- Clade: Angiosperms
- Clade: Monocots
- Clade: Commelinids
- Order: Poales
- Family: Juncaceae
- Genus: Luzula
- Species: L. subcongesta

Binomial name
- Luzula subcongesta (S.Watson) Jeps.

Species of flowering plant in the rush family

Luzula subcongesta is a species of flowering plant in the rush family known by the common name Donner woodrush. It is native to the high mountains of California, from the Klamath Mountains, where its distribution extends into Oregon, to the Sierra Nevada, where it may occur just inside Nevada as well.

== Description ==
It grows in wet habitat in the subalpine and alpine climates of the high mountain peaks. This is a rhizomatous perennial herb forming grasslike clumps of several erect stems approaching half a meter in maximum height. The stem is surrounded by tapering leaves with blue-green bases. The inflorescence is a bundle of several clusters of brown flowers.
