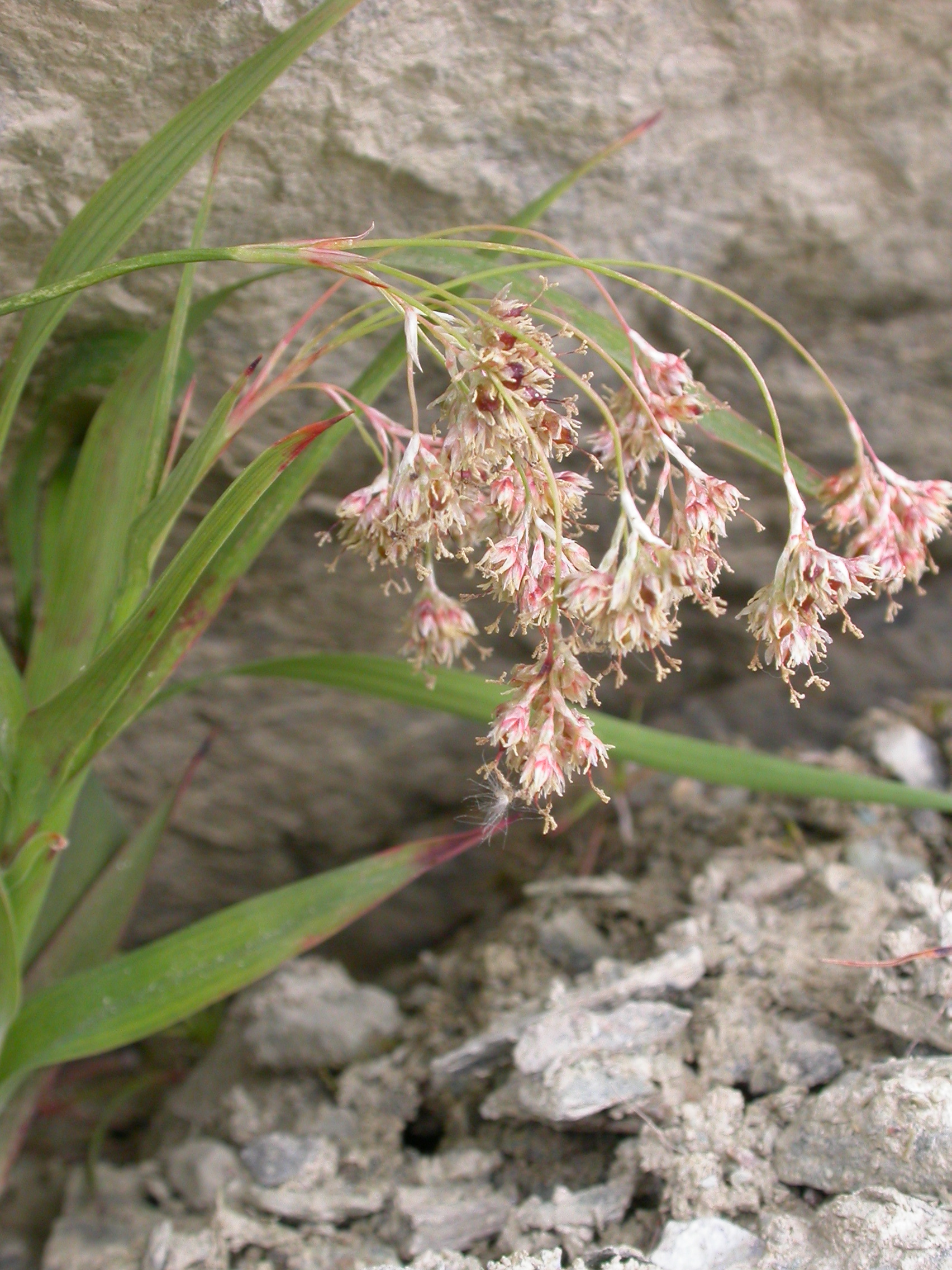

Scientific classification
- Kingdom: Plantae
- Clade: Embryophytes
- Clade: Tracheophytes
- Clade: Spermatophytes
- Clade: Angiosperms
- Clade: Monocots
- Clade: Commelinids
- Order: Poales
- Family: Juncaceae
- Genus: Luzula
- Species: L. lutea

Binomial name
- Luzula lutea (All.) DC.

Synonyms
- Juncus luteus All.

= Luzula lutea =

Species of flowering plant in the rush family

Luzula lutea, is a species of perennial plant in Juncaceae family which is 12–15 centimetres (4.7–5.9 in) tall. Its anthers are 1.1–1.8 millimetres (0.043–0.071 in) long while their filaments are 0.3–1.1 millimetres (0.012–0.043 in). The basal leaves of the species are usually 4–7 centimetres (1.6–2.8 in) long and 4–5 millimetres (0.16–0.20 in) wide, while its cauline leaves are 2–4 centimetres (0.79–1.57 in) in length. Its lower bract is brownish coloured and is 1.0–1.5 centimetres (0.39–0.59 in) long. It has ovate bracteoles which are circa 1.5 millimetres (0.059 in) in length.
