= Luzula divaricata =

Scientific classification
- Kingdom: Plantae
- Clade: Embryophytes
- Clade: Tracheophytes
- Clade: Spermatophytes
- Clade: Angiosperms
- Clade: Monocots
- Clade: Commelinids
- Order: Poales
- Family: Juncaceae
- Genus: Luzula
- Species: L. divaricata

Binomial name
- Luzula divaricata S.Watson

Species of flowering plant in the rush family

Luzula divaricata is a species of flowering plant in the rush family known by the common name forked woodrush. It is native to the California and Nevada in the United States.

Luzula divaricata grows in the subalpine and alpine climates of high mountain ranges. It is a perennial herb with a thin, reddish stem reaching about 30 centimeters (12 in) in maximum height surrounded by many grasslike leaves. The inflorescence is a tangled array of branches tipped with small reddish-brown spikelike flowers.
