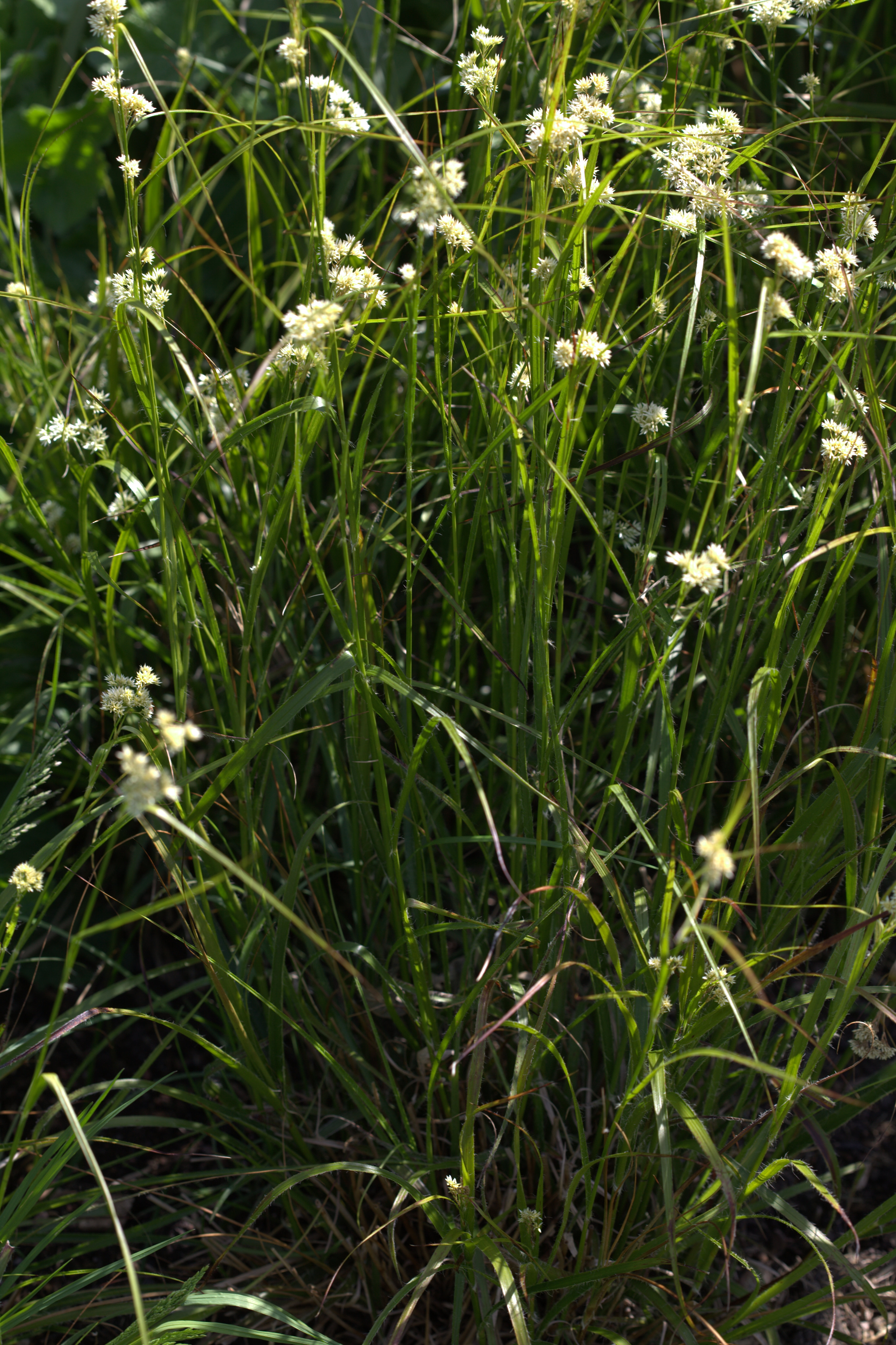

Scientific classification
- Kingdom: Plantae
- Clade: Tracheophytes
- Clade: Angiosperms
- Clade: Monocots
- Clade: Commelinids
- Order: Poales
- Family: Juncaceae
- Genus: Luzula
- Species: L. nivea

Binomial name
- Luzula nivea (Nathh.) DC.

= Luzula nivea =

Species of flowering plant in the rush family

Luzula nivea, commonly known as snow-white wood-rush, snowy wood-rush and lesser wood-rush, is a species of perennial plant in Juncaceae family.

The plant is native to Southwestern and Central Europe, including the Alps and Pyrenees.

== Description ==
Luzula nivea is 45–85 centimetres (18–33 in) in length. Its basal leaves are 20–30 centimetres (7.9–11.8 in) long and 3–4 millimetres (0.12–0.16 in) wide.

Its lower bract is 10–12 centimetres (3.9–4.7 in) long. Its anthers are 1.8–2.2 millimetres (0.071–0.087 in) long and are brownish coloured, while its filaments are 1.5–1.9 millimetres (0.059–0.075 in) long with a 2.2–2.6 millimetres (0.087–0.102 in) style. The species stigmas are 1.0–1.3 millimetres (0.039–0.051 in) long.

== Cultivation ==
Luzula nivea is cultivated as an ornamental grass, for planting in gardens. In some climates it can escape from gardens to become an invasive species.

== Gallery ==
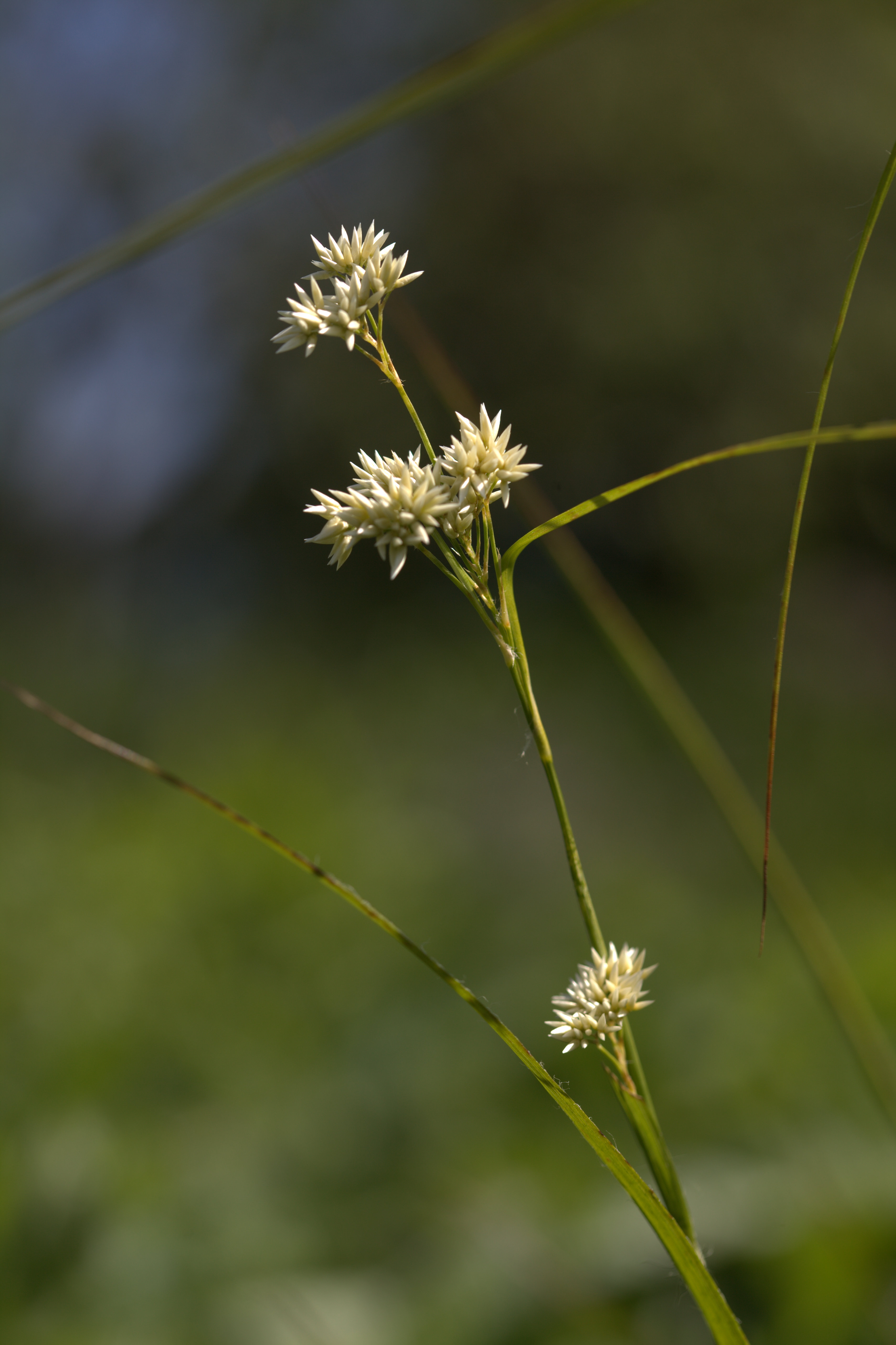
Flowers

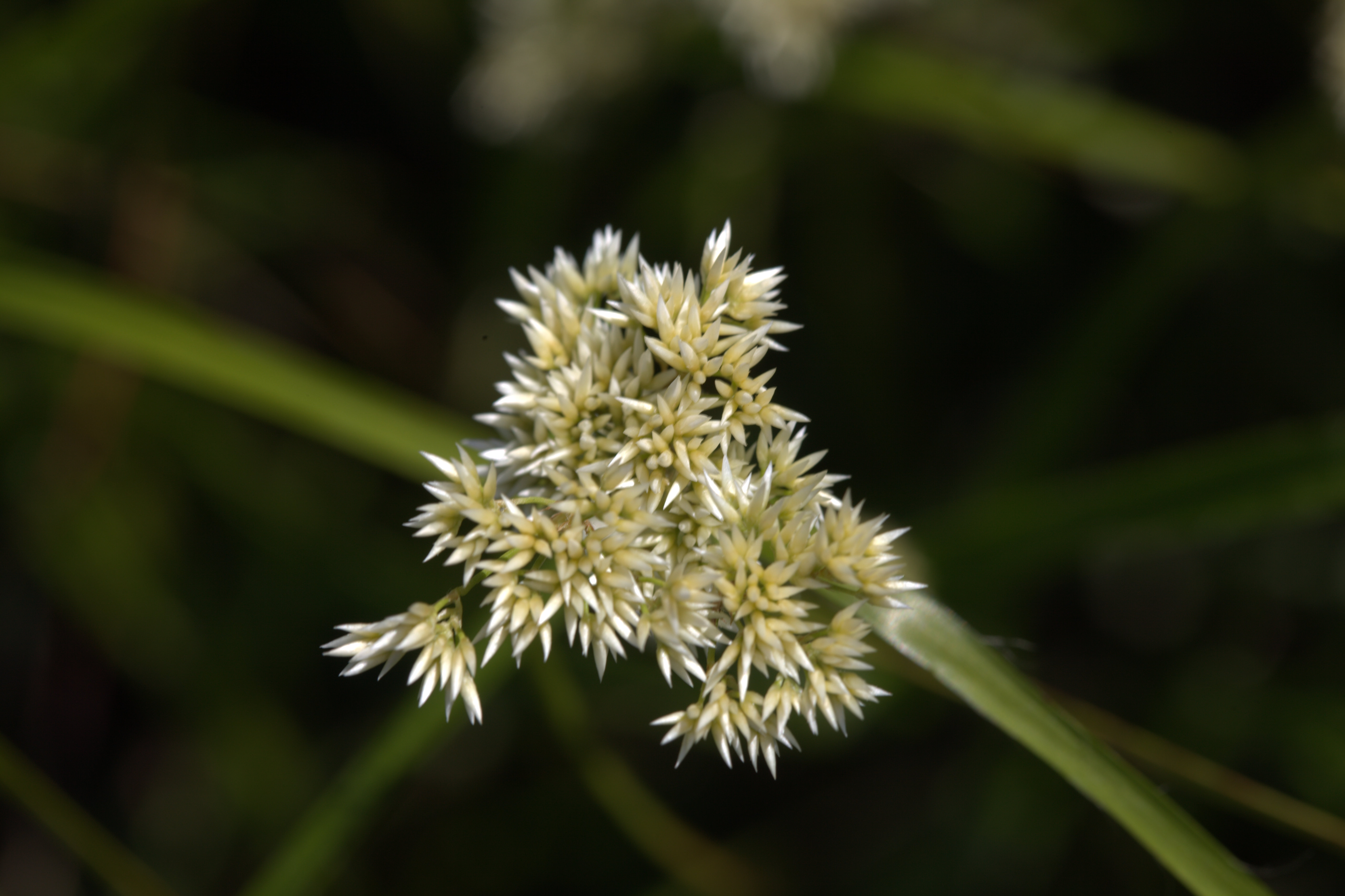
Flowers seen from above

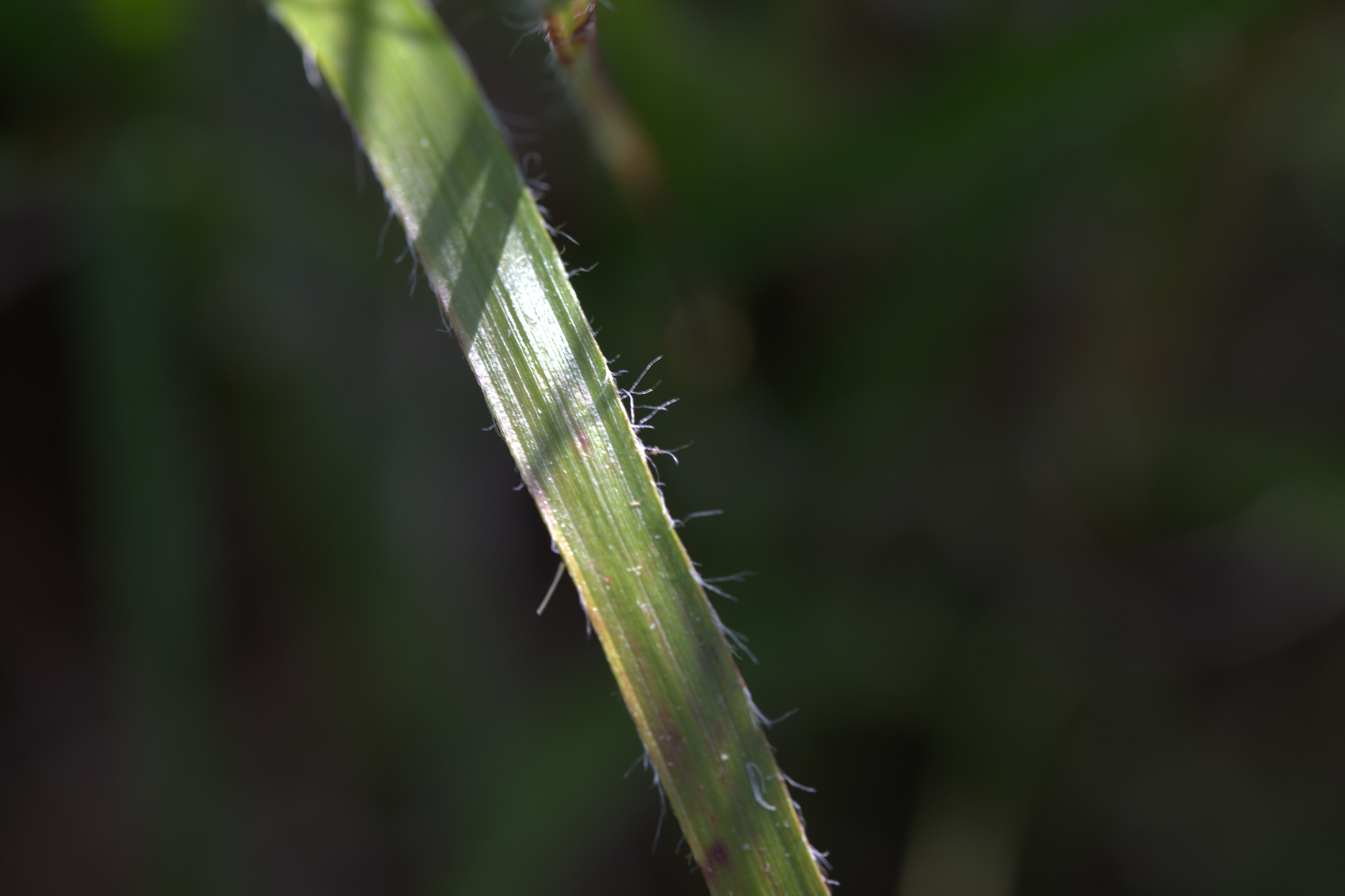
Closeup of a leaf
