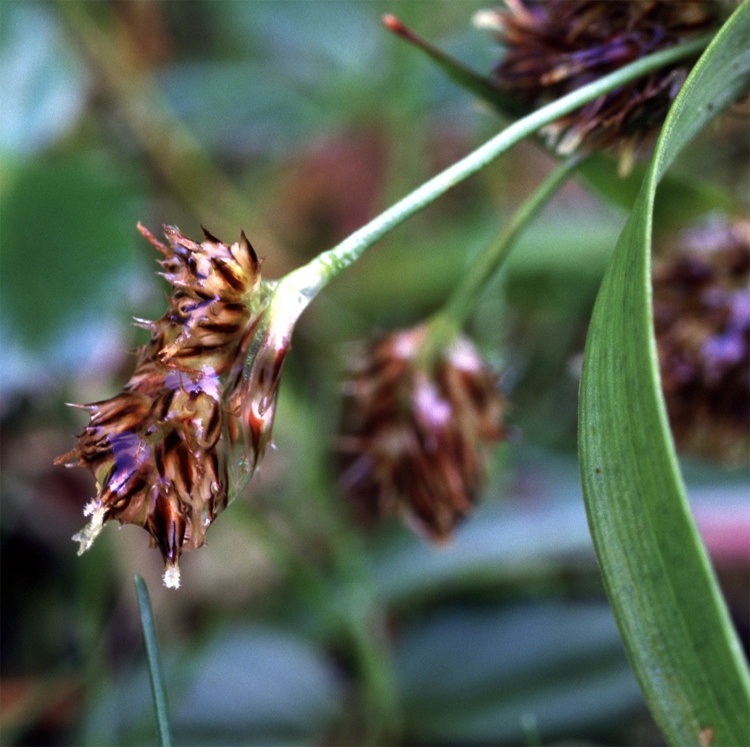

Scientific classification
- Kingdom: Plantae
- Clade: Embryophytes
- Clade: Tracheophytes
- Clade: Spermatophytes
- Clade: Angiosperms
- Clade: Monocots
- Clade: Commelinids
- Order: Poales
- Family: Juncaceae
- Genus: Luzula
- Species: L. comosa

Binomial name
- Luzula comosa E.Mey.

Synonyms
- Homotypic Synonyms: Juncoides campestris var. comosa (E.Mey.) Kuntze; Juncoides comosa (E.Mey.) E.Sheld.; Luzula campestris var. comosa (E.Mey.) Fernald & Wiegand; Luzula multiflora subsp. comosa (E.Mey.) Hultén

= Luzula comosa =

Species of flowering plant in the rush family

Luzula comosa is a species of flowering plant in the rush family, Juncaceae. It is sometimes referred to by the common name Pacific woodrush. It is native to western North America from Alaska to California to Colorado, where it can be found in moist spots in forests and meadows and many other types of habitat. It is a perennial herb quite variable in appearance, often forming small, narrow grasslike tufts. The erect inflorescence is tipped with a series of clustered spikelike flowers. The dark brown perianth parts open to reveal 6 stamens tipped with large anthers.
