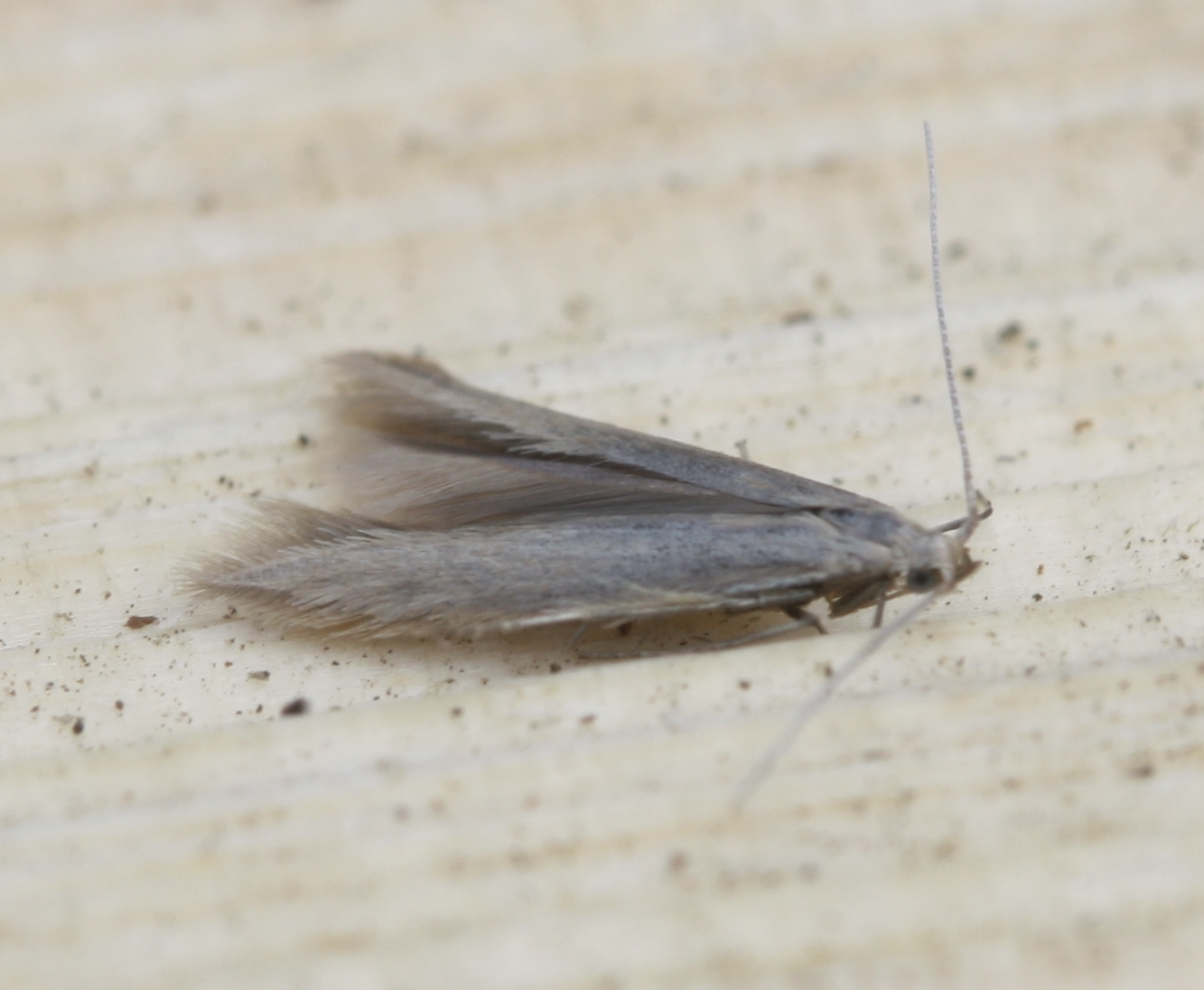

Scientific classification
- Kingdom: Animalia
- Phylum: Arthropoda
- Class: Insecta
- Order: Lepidoptera
- Family: Coleophoridae
- Genus: Coleophora
- Species: C. sylvaticella

Binomial name
- Coleophora sylvaticella Wood, 1892

Synonyms
- Coleophora etelka Gozmány, 1954

= Coleophora sylvaticella =

Species of moth

Coleophora sylvaticella is a moth of the family Coleophoridae found in Europe.

== Description ==
The wingspan is 11–12 mm (0.43–0.47 in). Coleophora species have narrow blunt to pointed forewings and a weakly defined tornus. The hindwings are narrow-elongate and very long-fringed. The upper surfaces have neither a discal spot nor transverse lines. Each abdomen segment of the abdomen has paired patches of tiny spines which show through the scales. The resting position is horizontal with the front end raised and the cilia give the hind tip a frayed and upturned look if the wings are rolled around the body.

C. sylvaticella characteristics include a greyish-ochreous head and white antennae. The forewings are greyish-ochreous; costa somewhat paler or whitish-tinged; costal cilia posteriorly pale ochreous. The hindwings are grey.

Adults are on wing in May and June.

The larvae feed on the seeds of greater wood-rush (Luzula sylvatica) forming a case and overwinter twice.

== Distribution ==
The moth is found from Norway and Sweden to France, Italy and Romania and from Ireland to Poland and Slovakia.
