= Coleophora biforis =

Scientific classification
- Kingdom: Animalia
- Phylum: Arthropoda
- Class: Insecta
- Order: Lepidoptera
- Family: Coleophoridae
- Genus: Coleophora
- Species: C. biforis

Binomial name
- Coleophora biforis Braun, 1921

Species of insect

Coleophora biforis is a moth of the family Coleophoridae. It is found in the United States, including Ohio.

The larvae feed on the seeds of Echinata species. They create a trivalved, tubular silken case.
