= Luzula orestera =

Scientific classification
- Kingdom: Plantae
- Clade: Embryophytes
- Clade: Tracheophytes
- Clade: Spermatophytes
- Clade: Angiosperms
- Clade: Monocots
- Clade: Commelinids
- Order: Poales
- Family: Juncaceae
- Genus: Luzula
- Species: L. orestera

Binomial name
- Luzula orestera Sharsm.

Species of flowering plant in the rush family

Luzula orestera, with the common name Hairy woodrush or Sierra woodrush, is a species of flowering plant in the rush family. It is endemic to the High Sierra Nevada of California, where it grows in fellfields, talus, and other habitat in regions of subalpine and alpine climates.

== Description ==
Luzula orestera is a perennial herb forming tough clumps of several stiff, erect stems up to about 26 centimeters (10 in) in maximum height surrounded by many grasslike leaves. The stem and leaves are generally reddish in color. The inflorescence is a triangular cluster of several dark brown flowers tucked between reddish, pointed bracts.
