= Luzula confusa =

Conservation status
- Secure (NatureServe)

Scientific classification
- Kingdom: Plantae
- Clade: Tracheophytes
- Clade: Angiosperms
- Clade: Monocots
- Clade: Commelinids
- Order: Poales
- Family: Juncaceae
- Genus: Luzula
- Species: L. confusa

Binomial name
- Luzula confusa Lindeb.

Species of grass

Luzula confusa, also known as the northern woodrush, is a species of rush belonging to the family Juncaceae. Its native range is subarctic North America to Northeastern USA.
