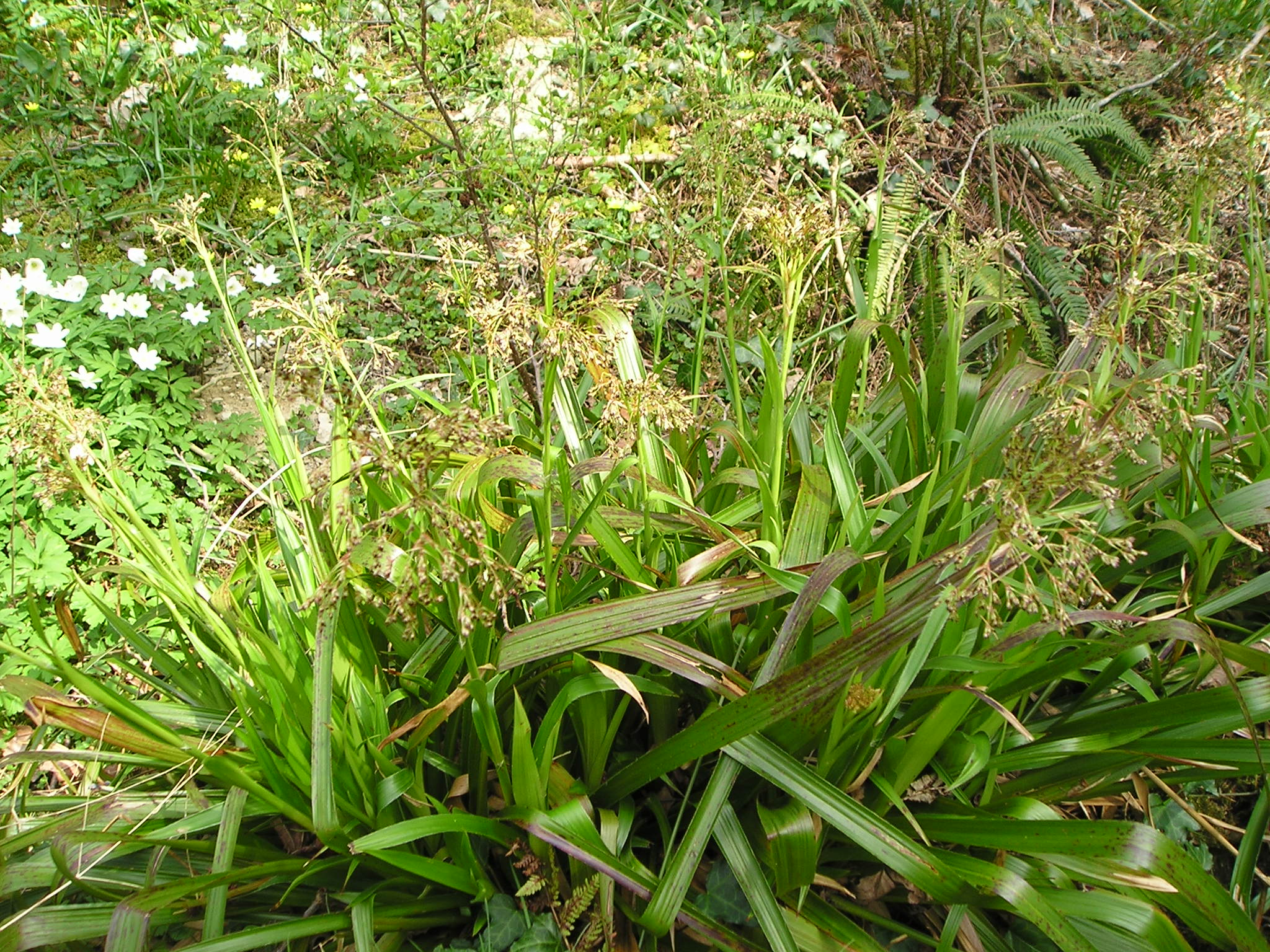

Conservation status
- Least Concern (IUCN 3.1)

Scientific classification
- Kingdom: Plantae
- Clade: Embryophytes
- Clade: Tracheophytes
- Clade: Spermatophytes
- Clade: Angiosperms
- Clade: Monocots
- Clade: Commelinids
- Order: Poales
- Family: Juncaceae
- Genus: Luzula
- Species: L. sylvatica

Binomial name
- Luzula sylvatica (Huds.) Gaudin, 1762

Synonyms
- Juncoides sylvatica (Huds.) Druce; Juncus sylvaticus Huds.; Luzula haussknechtiana Freyn & Sint.

= Luzula sylvatica =

Species of flowering plant in the rush family

Luzula sylvatica, commonly known as greater wood-rush or great wood-rush, is a perennial flowering plant in the rush family Juncaceae.

== Description ==
Luzula sylvatica is the largest woodrush, with stems 30–80 centimetres (12–31 in) high. It forms clumps of bright green leaves which are glossy, flat, linear, about 10–30 centimetres (3.9–11.8 in) in length and 1 centimetre (0.39 in) wide; its leaves remain green or at least greenish throughout winter. The leaves can also help to differentiate the plant from similar-looking plants in the closely related genus Juncus, as scattered white hairs can be found along the leaf edges. Its tepals are 3–3.5 millimetres (0.12–0.14 in), with flowers which grow in groups of 3 or 4. It flowers from mid-spring to summer. It produces flowers in open panicles which are very small, chestnut-brown in colour and can be found in dense and lax clusters. It is sometimes stoloniferous.

Luzula sylvatica can be pollinated by either wind or insects. L. sylvatica's fruit is a 3-valved capsule containing three oblong seeds. Each seed is indistinctly reticulate, often with a caruncle (a basal or apical appendage); seeds tend to germinate close to their parent plant.

== Taxonomy and naming ==
With regard to the etymology of the binomial, Luzula could come from the Italian lucciola ("to shine, sparkle") or the Latin luzulae or luxulae, from lux ("light"), inspired by the way the plants sparkle when wet with dew; whilst sylvatica comes from silva, Latin for forest.

== Distribution and habitat ==
Luzula sylvatica has a wide distribution, and is native to Europe (the European temperate element of flora) and southwest Asia—including the British Isles where populations are widespread and stable, apart from a decline in central and south east England. There is one record from Washington state, United States.

Usually growing in partial to full shade, Luzula sylvatica tends to grow on acidic soils in damp habitats. It can be found on stream banks and well-drained, open woodland, as well as in open ground and rock ledges and peaty heath moors. Despite its preference for acidic soils, it can tolerate most soil pH levels.

== Ecology ==
The leaves of Luzula sylvatica are picked in winter by golden eagles to line their eyries. The flowers and seeds are also the sole food source for the larvae of the Coleophora sylvaticella moth.

== Cultivation ==
Luzula sylvatica is commonly used in horticulture—its thick, patch-forming habit (which allows the plant to act as a weed suppressant), hardiness, as well as the ability to grow in shade and damp soils being particular boons; it is commonly used for ground cover and/or as an ornamental grass.

The cultivar 'Marginata' has gained the Royal Horticultural Society's Award of Garden Merit.
