= Leena Hämet-Ahti =

Finnish botanist (1931-)

Leena Hämet-Ahti (née Hämet, b. 3 January 1931, Kuusamo), also known as Raija-Leena Hämet-Ahti, is a Finnish botanist, plant taxonomist, and plant collector noted for being Associate Professor of Botany at the University of Helsinki, and later the Director of the university's Botanical Garden.

== Biography ==
She primarily studies alpine plants of Finland and similar northern hemisphere climates. Her PhD thesis, defended in 1963, was on mountain birch forests. She participated in the production of the seminal Finnish floras Retkeilykasvio (1984, 1998) and Suomen puu- ja pensaskasvio (1992).

Hämet-Ahti won the Finnish Cultural Foundation prize in 1990 and the Finnish Biological Society Vanamo silver Kairamo medal in 2007 "in recognition of her many merits in botany, university teaching, science popularisation and fostering Finnish cultural heritage". Her book Maarianheinä, mesimarja ja timotei won a State Public Information Award in 1987 and her Suomen puu- ja pensaskasvio was selected as Science Book of the Year in 1989.

Hämet-Ahti has been a member of the Finnish Academy of Science and Letters since 1991. She is married to botanist and lichenologist Teuvo Ahti.

The standard author abbreviation Hämet-Ahti is used to indicate this person as the author when citing a botanical name.
