= Luigi Anguillara =

Italian botanist (1512–1570)

Luigi Anguillara, actually Luigi Squalermo, (born c. 1512 in Anguillara Sabazia, died September 1570 in Ferrara) was an Italian botanist.

== Life ==
Little is known about Anguillara's early life. From 1539, he is attested at the private botanical gardens of Luca Ghini in Bologna and in 1544 in Pisa. In 1546, he was the first director of the Botanical Gardens in Padua. There he remained until 1561, when an argument with the botanists Ulisse Aldrovandi (Director of the Orto Botanico di Bologna) and Pietro Andrea Mattioli led him to depart for Ferrara, where he served as Botanist of the Duke of Ferrara and continued his travels. Anguillara ranged widely over Greece, Italy, France, and Asia Minor and developed a very detailed knowledge of Mediterranean plants as a result. He may also have taught medicine in Ferrara and he probably died there from the plague.

Anguillara is known for his sole work, Semplici, which was written between 1549 and 1560. It describes 1,540 plants, their medicinal properties, and where they are found. The descriptions are clear enough that historians are able to identify most of the plants described by him. He also provides bibliographic notes and alternative names. The work drew on the De Materia Medica of Pedanius Dioscorides and other ancient authors and is divided into fourteen chapters, each dedicated to a contemporary Italian doctor. The book was frequently cited by botanists in the 17th century.

Robert Brown named the genus of Liliales Anguillaria after him in 1810.

== Writings ==
- Semplici dell' eccellente ... liquali in piu pareri a diversi nobili huomini scritti appaiono, et nuovamente da m. Giovanni Marinello mandati in luce, Venice 1561 (Latin translation with commentary by Gaspard Bauhin, Basel 1593) Digitalisat Bayerische Staatsbibliothek

== Bibliography ==
- Jerry Stannard, "Anguillara, Luigi," in Dictionary of Scientific Biography
- Ettore De Toni, "Luigi Anguillara e Pietro Antonio Michiel," Annali di botanica, 8 (1910), 617–685
- Ludovic Legré, La botanique en provence au XVIe siècle: Louis Anguillara, Pierre Belon, Charles de l’Escluse, Antoine Constantin, Marseille, 1901
