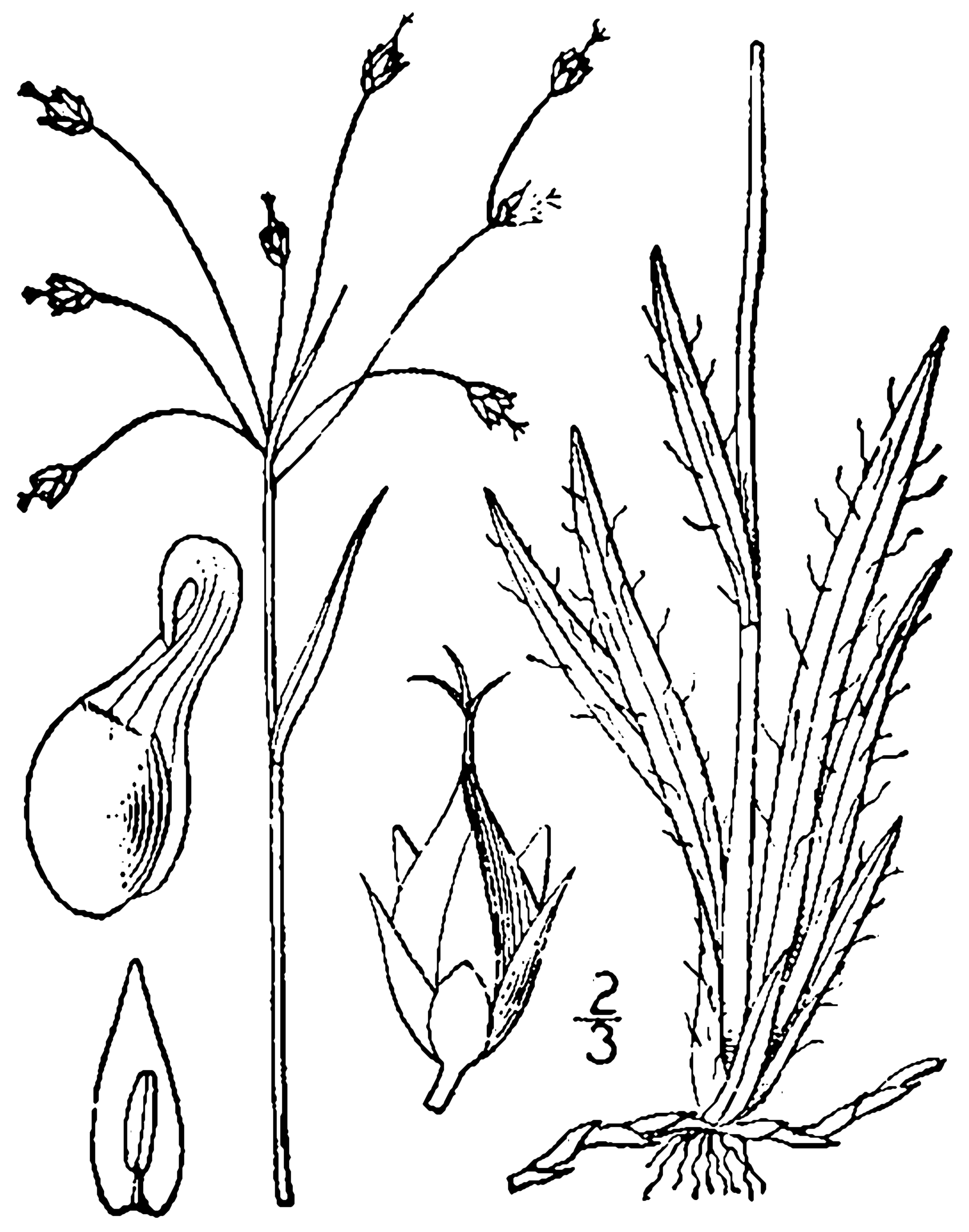

Scientific classification
- Kingdom: Plantae
- Clade: Embryophytes
- Clade: Tracheophytes
- Clade: Spermatophytes
- Clade: Angiosperms
- Clade: Monocots
- Clade: Commelinids
- Order: Poales
- Family: Juncaceae
- Genus: Luzula
- Species: L. acuminata

Binomial name
- Luzula acuminata Raf.

= Luzula acuminata =

Species of flowering plant in the rush family

Luzula acuminata, the hairy woodrush, is a species of perennial flowering plant in the rush family, Juncaceae, that is native to the Eastern United States and Canada. It is 6–47 centimetres (2.4–18.5 in) tall with its basal leaves being of 6–39 centimetres (2.4–15.4 in) high and 2–11 millimetres (0.079–0.433 in) in diameter. It has cauline leaves are 2.5–11.5 centimetres (0.98–4.53 in) tall and 2–5 millimetres (0.079–0.197 in) wide.

== Description ==
Luzula acuminata, flowers in the months of May and June. This perennial has a minimum height of four inches and has a maximum height of sixteen inches. The leaf of the plant is considered simple, not complex, with a leaf margin that is entire. Luzula acuminata is a grass-like plant, in the sense that it has a linear shaped leaf with various white hairs stemming from the leaves. Leaves can range from two to twelve inches and be as wide as ½ inch. Leaves are a brownish color at the base of the leaf and have a pointed apex. The leaf pubescence is tomentose, which means that the hair is very fine and very dense. The veins of the leaf are parallel. The leaves are likely to turn a reddish color in the fall season. Solitary flowers have six petals. Individual plants have five flowers to twenty flowers that are slender and are approximately ¼ inch wide. When the flower opens, the stalk will vary in color, from green to yellowish, to dark brown. Fibrous roots emerge along the rhizome. When the roots are fresh, they are a bright white color, but when they are aged, the roots become a more yellow or brown. In the months of May and June, the fruit, a capsule will drop seeds. Each capsule bears three seeds.

== Taxonomy ==
The species was described, by Constantine Samuel Rafinesque. The species description was published in 1840, in the Autikon Botanikon. Luzula is a combination of the Latin verb lucére that means "a give light" and the Italian word lucciola, which means "a little light" or "to shine or sparkle". The name refers to the shining light that is produced when the long, overlain hairs on the leaves are wet. Acuminata also stems from a Latin word, acuminatus, which means "sharp" or "pointy", referring to the leaf apex.

Subspecies

Luzula acuminata acuminata (Raf, 1840)

Luzula acuminata carolinae (S.Watson, 2001)

== Distribution and habitat ==
In the United States, this plant is commonly found in many central and eastern states. This range includes states from Maine to Florida, and west to Wisconsin, South Dakota, and Louisiana. This species is an understory plant of mesic to dry forests. Luzula acuminata is found in deciduous woodlands, mixed deciduous-evergreen woodlands, wooded bluffs, ravines, or forest clearings. Luzula acuminata grow in USDA hardiness zones 3–8. Luzula acuminata is closely associated with Luzula acuminata var. carolinae (Carolina Woodrush), Luzula luzuloides ssp. luzuloides (Oak-Forest Woodrush), Luzula echinata (Spreading Woodrush), Luzula bulbosa (Bulbous Woodrush), and Luzula multiflora var. multiflora (Common Woodrush).

== Uses ==
Luzula acuminata provides forage for various wildlife, deer and other small mammals. Landscapers use this plant due to its eye-catching appearance and its ability to be very successful in shaded areas. Hairy woodrush is also used for control soil erosion due to a very dense and fibrous root system.
