= Franz Georg Philipp Buchenau =

German botanist and phytogeographer

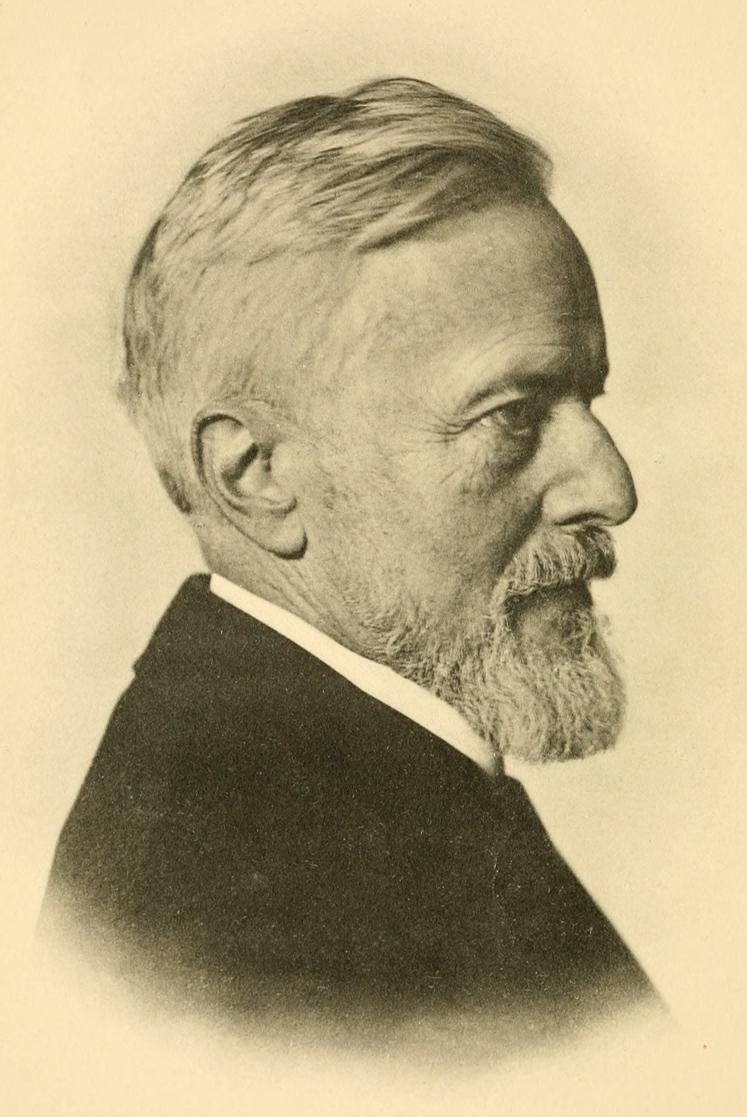
Franz Georg Philipp Buchenau

Franz Georg Philipp Buchenau (12 January 1831 – 23 April 1906) was a German botanist and phytogeographer who was a native of Kassel. He specialized in flora of northwestern Germany.

He studied at the Universities of Marburg and Göttingen, and from 1855 was a schoolteacher in Bremen. In 1864 he was co-founder of the association for natural sciences in Bremen.

Buchenau was the author of works involving the regional flora of the East Frisian Islands, Flora der Ostfriesischen Inseln, and of Bremen/Oldenburg, Flora von Bremen und Oldenburg. He also published a comprehensive monograph on the botanical family Juncaceae, titled Monographia Juncacearum.
