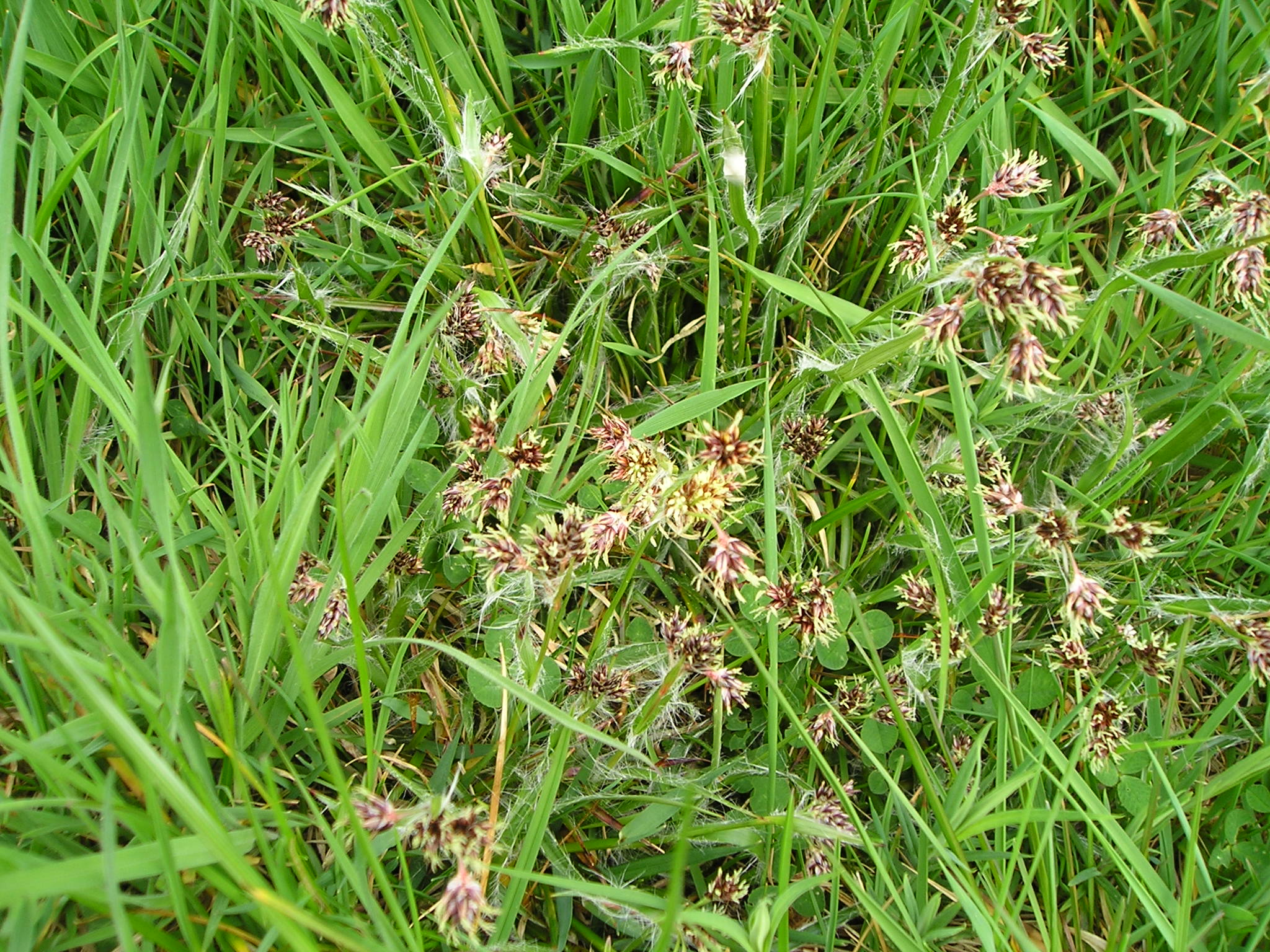

Scientific classification
- Kingdom: Plantae
- Clade: Embryophytes
- Clade: Tracheophytes
- Clade: Spermatophytes
- Clade: Angiosperms
- Clade: Monocots
- Clade: Commelinids
- Order: Poales
- Family: Juncaceae
- Genus: Luzula
- Species: L. campestris

Binomial name
- Luzula campestris (L.) DC.

Synonyms
- Juncus campestris L.

= Luzula campestris =

Species of flowering plant in the rush family

Luzula campestris, commonly known as field wood-rush or Good Friday grass is a flowering plant in the rush family Juncaceae. It is also one of the plants known as chimney sweeps or sweep's broom because of the brush-like appearance of their flowers. This is a very common plant throughout temperate Europe extending to the Caucasus. This species of Luzula is found on all types of native grasslands, and cultivated areas such as lawns, golf-course greens and fields.

== Description ==
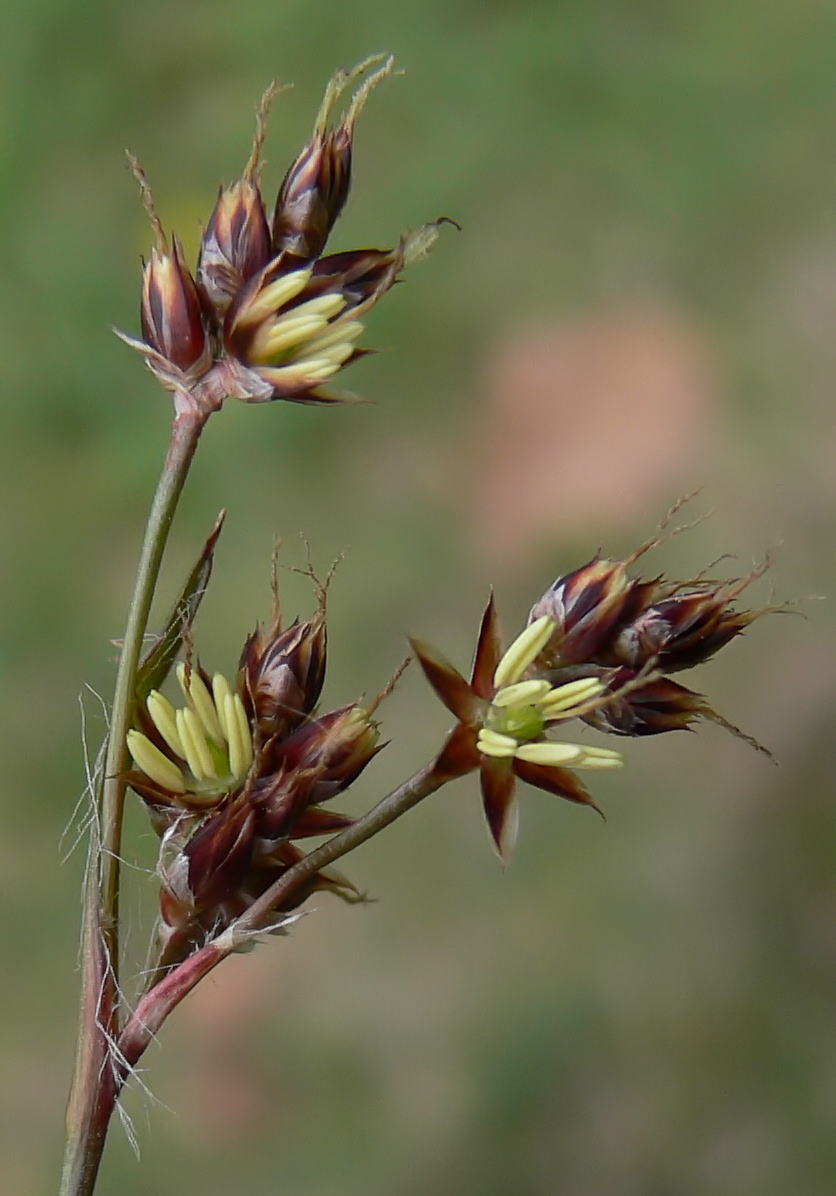
Inflorescence

Luzula campestris is relatively short, between 5 and 15 cm (2 and 6 in) tall. It spreads via short stolons and also via seed produced in one stemless cluster of flowers together with three to six stemmed clusters of flowers. It is a perennial.

It flowers between March and June in the northern temperate zone (September to December in the southern hemisphere). The diploid chromosome number 2n is 12.

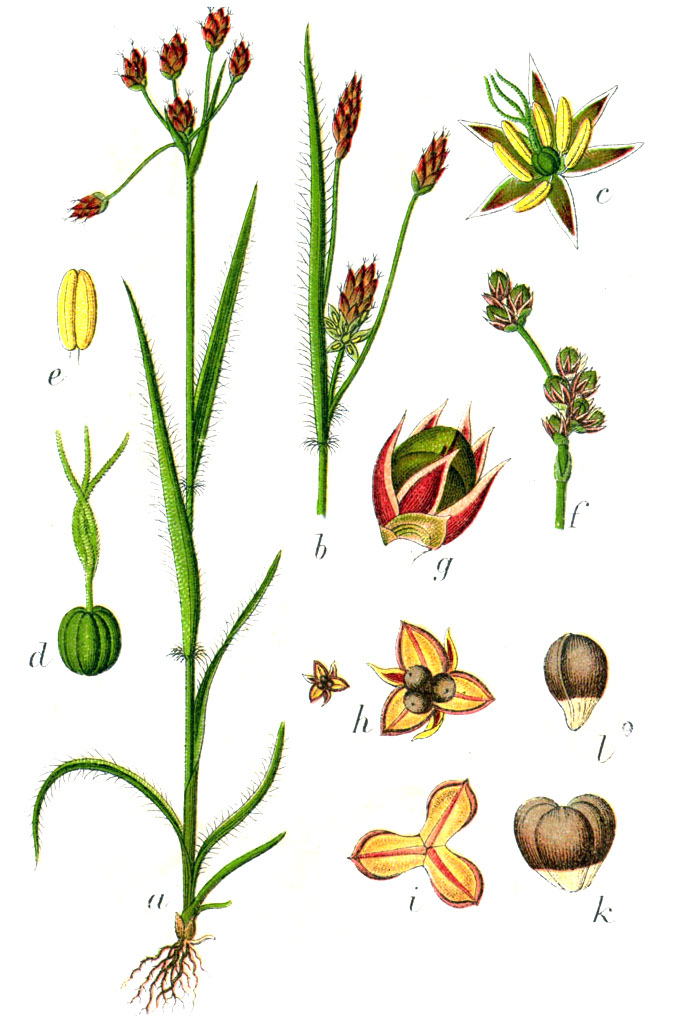
Luzula campestris

It prefers an acidic soil, and when considered a weed in cultivated grass such as lawns, its presence can be readily reduced by decreasing acidity, specifically by removing any accumulation of dead grass material.

== Distribution ==
The native range of Luzula campestris is temperate Europe, extending to North Africa in the south, to the Caucasus in the east and has a northern limit in Scandinavia.

Luzula campestris has been introduced worldwide outside its native range into suitable habitats in the southern hemisphere.

The closely related Luzula multiflora is native in much of North America, and is a distinct species in the Flora of North America. Some botanists treat it as a variety, Luzula campestris var. multiflora.
