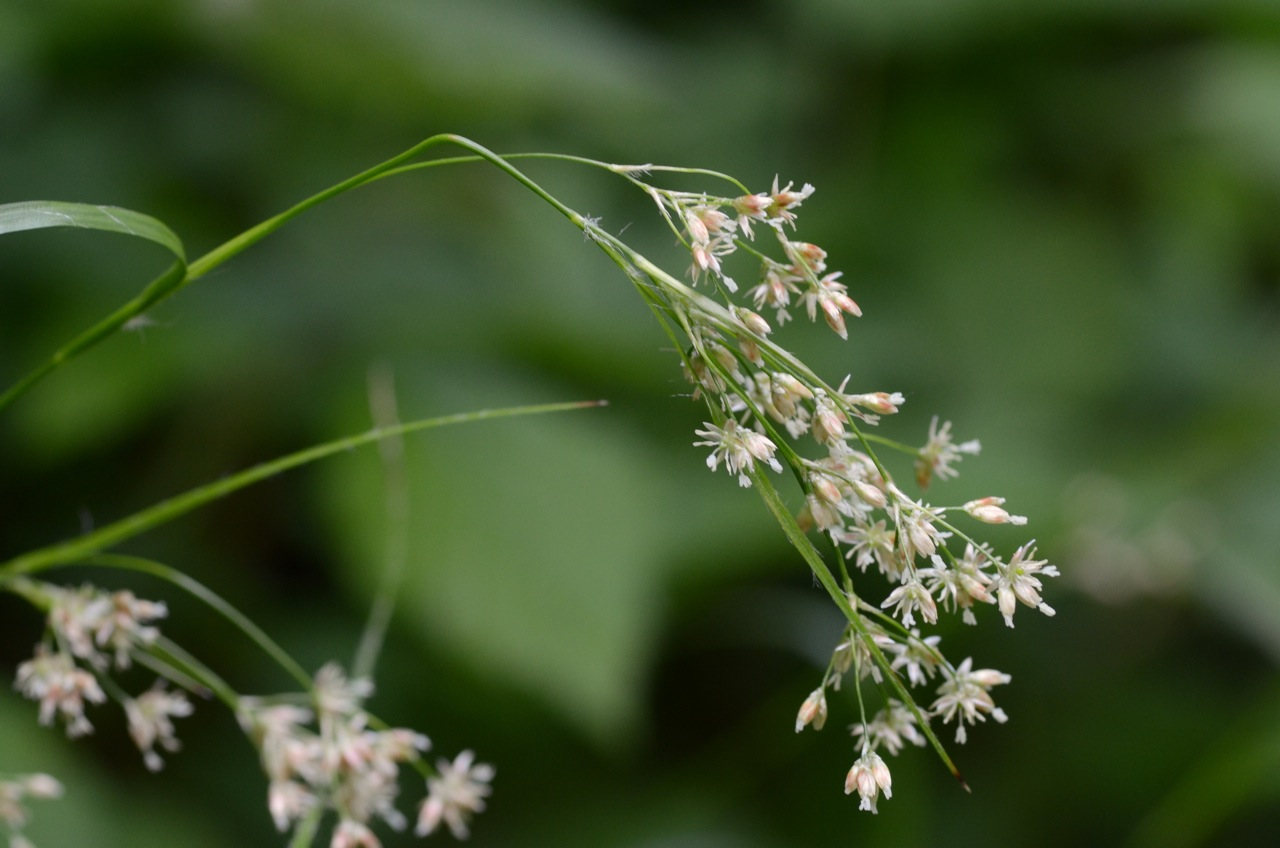

Scientific classification
- Kingdom: Plantae
- Clade: Embryophytes
- Clade: Tracheophytes
- Clade: Spermatophytes
- Clade: Angiosperms
- Clade: Monocots
- Clade: Commelinids
- Order: Poales
- Family: Juncaceae
- Genus: Luzula
- Species: L. luzuloides

Binomial name
- Luzula luzuloides (Lam.) Dandy & Wilmott

Synonyms
- Juncus luzuloides Lam.

= Luzula luzuloides =

Species of flowering plant in the rush family

Luzula luzuloides, the white wood-rush or oakforest wood-rush is a species of flowering plant in the family Juncaceae (rush family). It is native to Central Europe, from the Balkans to Fennoscandia, but it has also been introduced to the British Isles and other parts of Europe, and to the north-eastern United States and eastern Canada.
