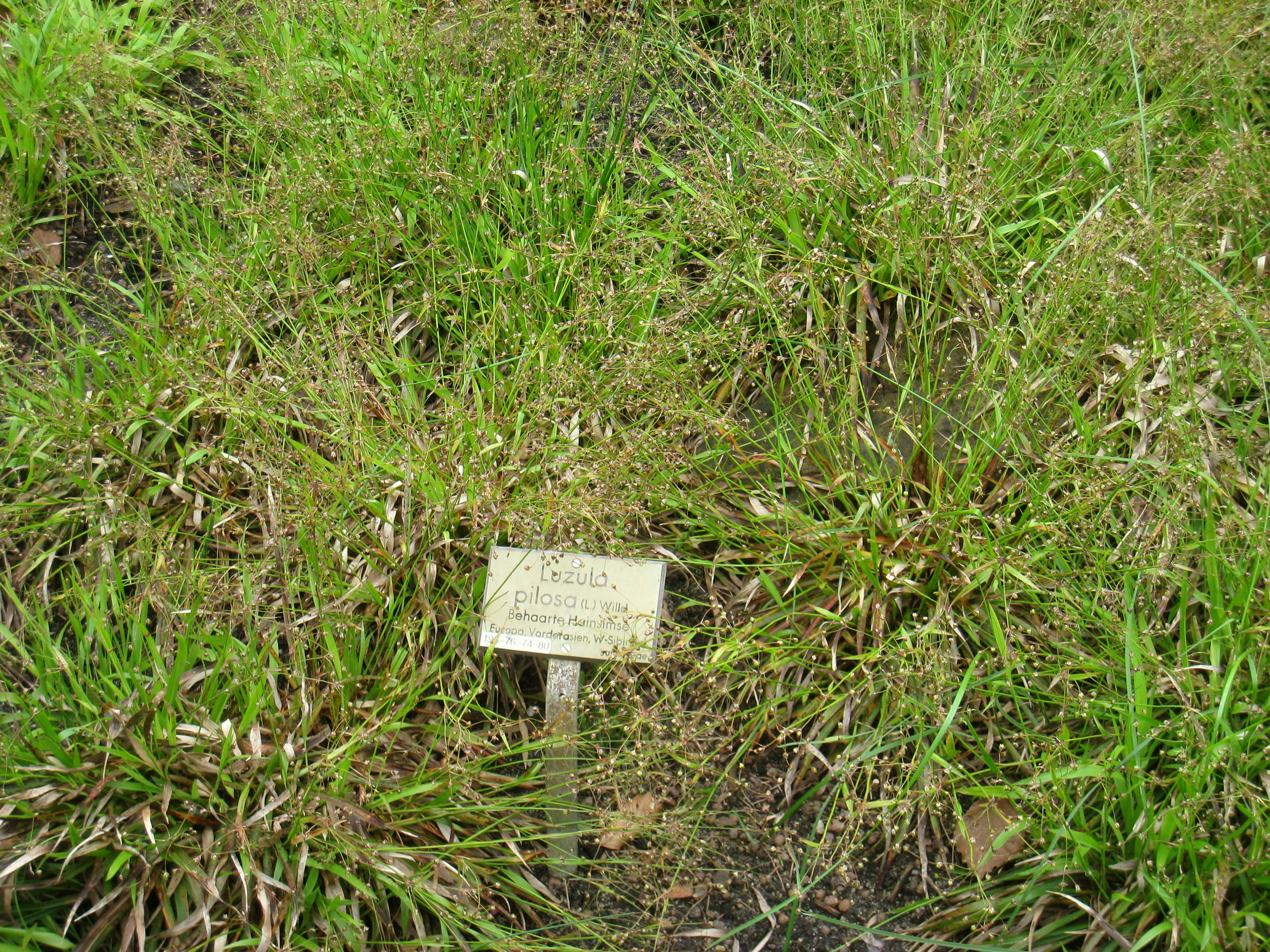

Scientific classification
- Kingdom: Plantae
- Clade: Tracheophytes
- Clade: Angiosperms
- Clade: Monocots
- Clade: Commelinids
- Order: Poales
- Family: Juncaceae
- Genus: Luzula
- Species: L. pilosa

Binomial name
- Luzula pilosa (L.) Willd.

Synonyms
- Juncus pilosus L.

= Luzula pilosa =

Species of flowering plant in the rush family

Luzula pilosa is a species of flowering plant in the rush family Juncaceae with the common name hairy wood-rush. The plant is native to northern Europe and western Asia.

== Description ==
Luzula pilosa is a short, tufted, grass-like perennial herb. The leaves are blunt, about 4mm wide, the leaf margins fringed with long fine hairs. In North America the common name "hairy wood rush" is given to a similar but different species, Luzula acuminata.

== Distribution ==
It prefers moist but well-drained, somewhat acidic soils, but is not confined to them. It avoids competition, and in lowland locations occurs among leaf litter or moss. It is native to Europe and western Asia. The geographical distribution of the native range includes the British Isles, northern Europe, largely avoiding the Mediterranean, and north-western Asia. It also occurs in the Caucasus.
