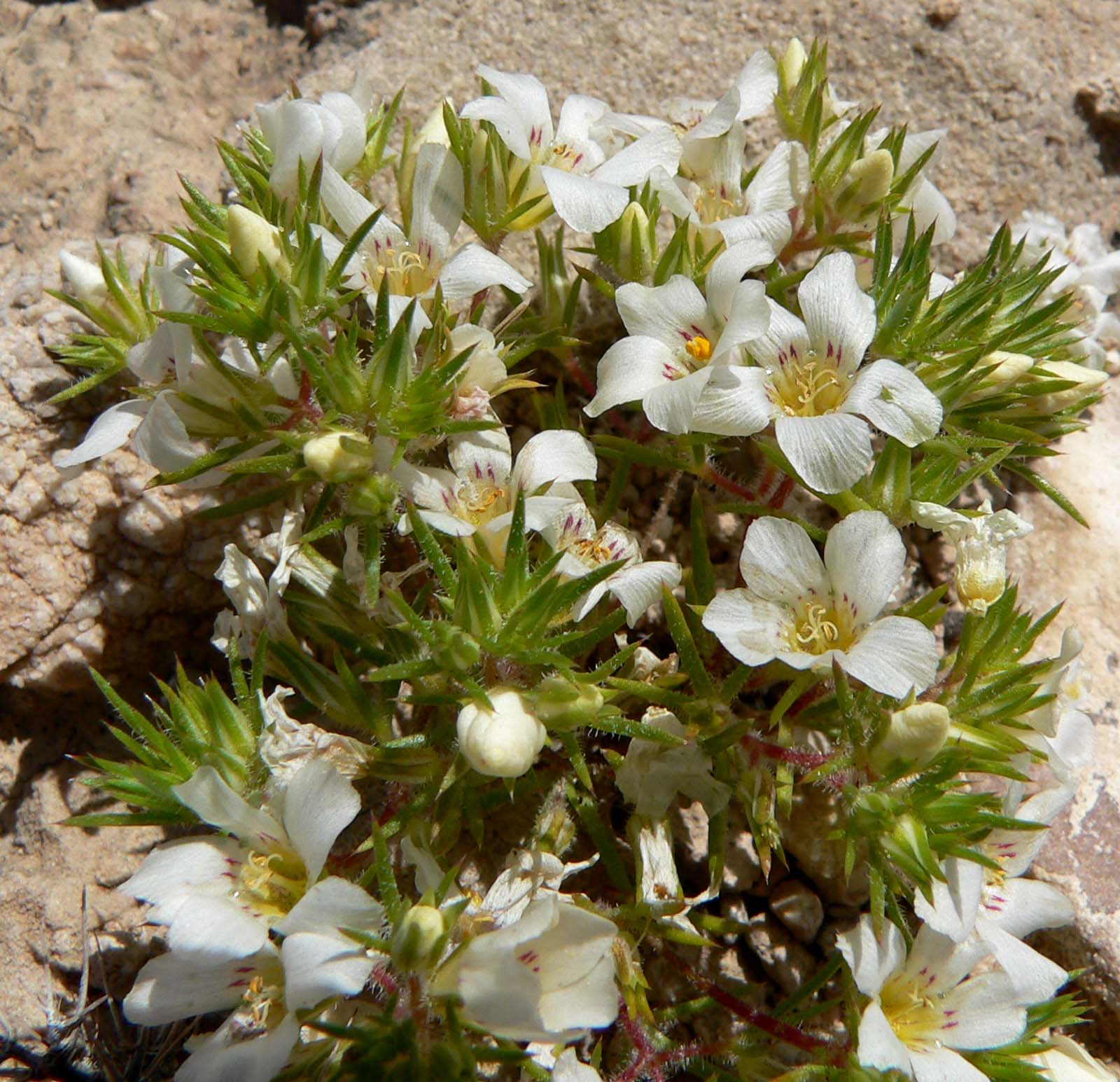
- Linanthus demissus

Scientific classification
- Kingdom: Plantae
- Clade: Tracheophytes
- Clade: Angiosperms
- Clade: Eudicots
- Clade: Asterids
- Order: Ericales
- Family: Polemoniaceae
- Genus: Linanthus; Benth. (1833)

Species
- 26, see text

Synonyms
- Fenzlia Benth. (1833), nom. illeg.; Leptodactylon Hook. & Arn. (1839); Tintinabulum Rydb. (1917)

= Linanthus =

Genus of flowering plants

Linanthus is a genus of annual and perennial plants in the phlox family Polemoniaceae. The species are found in western North America and in Chile, with the greatest diversity in California.

The stems are erect, with multiple branches arising directly from the base, and grow 2–15 cm tall. The leaves are stem-like (cauline) and opposite, with shapes ranging from entire to palmately lobed, the 3-9 lobes being linear to lanceolate or spatulate. Flowers have a tubular calyx, and the corolla may be funnel- or bell-shaped, or salverform.

The genus name is from the Greek for "flax flower", since the flowers superficially resemble those of flax. The genus has recently been split, with many of the species formerly included now transferred to the genus Leptosiphon (Jepson Manual).

== Species ==
26 species are accepted.

- Linanthus arenicola (M.E.Jones) Jeps. & V.L.Bailey
- Linanthus bellus (Gray) Greene
- Linanthus bernardinus N.S.Fraga & D.S.Bell
- Linanthus bigelovii (A. Gray) Greene
- Linanthus caespitosus (Nutt.) J.M.Porter & L.A.Johnson
- Linanthus californicus (Hook. & Arn.) J.M.Porter & L.A.Johnson
- Linanthus campanulatus (A.Gray) J.M.Porter & L.A.Johnson
- Linanthus concinnus Milliken
- Linanthus demissus (A. Gray) Greene
- Linanthus dianthiflorus (Benth.) Greene
- Linanthus dichotomus Benth.
- Linanthus filiformis (Parry ex A. Gray) J.M. Porter & L.A. Johnson
- Linanthus glaber (R.Patt. & Yoder-Will.) J.M.Porter & L.A.Johnson
- Linanthus graciosus Milliken
- Linanthus inyoensis (I.M.Johnst.) J.M.Porter & L.A.Johnson
- Linanthus jaegeri (Munz) J.M.Porter & L.A.Johnson
- Linanthus jonesii (A. Gray) Greene
- Linanthus killipii H. Mason
- Linanthus maricopensis J.M.Porter & R.Patt.
- Linanthus orcuttii (Parry & A. Gray) Jeps.
- Linanthus parryae (A. Gray) Greene
- Linanthus pungens (Torr.) J.M. Porter & L.A. Johnson
- Linanthus veatchii (Parry ex Greene) J.M.Porter & L.A.Johnson
- Linanthus viscainensis Moran
- Linanthus watsonii (A. Gray) J.M. Porter & L.A. Johnson

=== Formerly placed here ===
- Leptosiphon acicularis Jeps. (as Linanthus acicularis Greene)
- Leptosiphon ambiguus (Rattan) J.M.Porter & L.A.Johnson (as Linanthus ambiguus (Rattan) Greene)
- Leptosiphon androsaceus Benth. (as Linanthus androsaceus Greene)
- Leptosiphon bicolor Nutt. (as Linanthus bicolor (Nutt.) Greene)
- Leptosiphon bolanderi (A.Gray) J.M.Porter & L.A.Johnson (as Linanthus bolanderi Greene)
- Leptosiphon breviculus (A.Gray) J.M.Porter & L.A.Johnson (as Linanthus breviculus Greene)
- Leptosiphon ciliatus (Benth.) Jeps. (as Linanthus ciliatus (Benth.) Greene)
- Leptosiphon filipes (Benth.) J.M.Porter & L.A.Johnson (as Linanthus filipes Greene)
- Leptosiphon floribundus (A.Gray) J.M.Porter & L.A.Johnson (as Linanthus floribundus (A.Gray) Greene ex Milliken)
- Leptosiphon grandiflorus Benth. (as Linanthus grandiflorus Greene)
- Leptosiphon harknessii (Curran) J.M.Porter & L.A.Johnson (as Linanthus harknessii (Curran) Greene)
- Leptosiphon lemmonii (A.Gray) J.M.Porter & L.A.Johnson (as Linanthus lemmonii (A.Gray) Greene)
- Leptosiphon liniflorus (Benth.) J.M.Porter & L.A.Johnson (as Linanthus liniflorus Greene)
- Leptosiphon montanus (Greene) J.M.Porter & L.A.Johnson (as Linanthus montanus Greene)
- Leptosiphon nudatus (Greene) J.M.Porter & L.A.Johnson (as Linanthus nudatus Greene)
- Leptosiphon nuttallii (A.Gray) J.M.Porter & L.A.Johnson (as Linanthus nuttallii (A.Gray) Greene ex Milliken)
- Leptosiphon oblanceolatus (Brand) J.M.Porter & L.A.Johnson (as Linanthus oblanceolatus Eastw. ex Brand)
- Leptosiphon pachyphyllus (R.Patt.) J.M.Porter & L.A.Johnson (as Linanthus pachyphyllus R.Patt.)
- Leptosiphon parviflorus Benth. (as Linanthus parviflorus (Benth.) Greene)
- Leptosiphon pygmaeus (Brand) J.M.Porter & L.A.Johnson (as Linanthus pygmaeus (Brand) J.T.Howell)
- Leptosiphon rattanii (A.Gray) J.M.Porter & L.A.Johnson (as Linanthus rattanii (A.Gray) Greene)
- Leptosiphon septentrionalis (H.Mason) J.M.Porter & L.A.Johnson (as Linanthus septentrionalis H.Mason)
- Leptosiphon serrulatus (Greene) J.M.Porter & L.A.Johnson (as Linanthus serrulatus Greene)
- Maculigilia maculata (Parish) V.E.Grant (as Linanthus maculatus (Parish) Milliken)
