= Ground pink =

Ground pink is a common name of some flowering plants:

- Some Dianthus species
- Linanthus dianthiflorus, endemic to southern California
- Phlox stolonifera, native to the eastern United States
