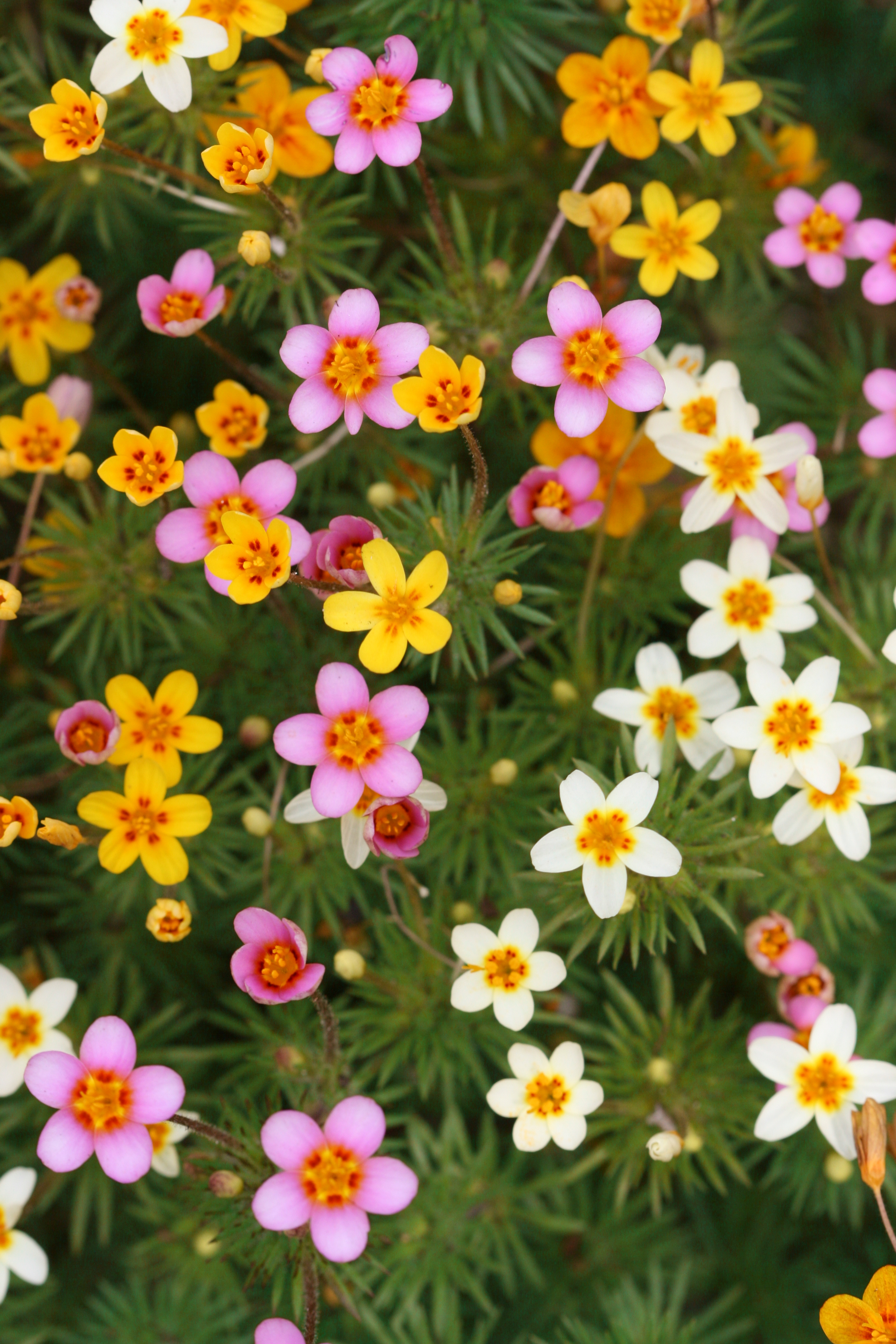

Scientific classification
- Kingdom: Plantae
- Clade: Tracheophytes
- Clade: Angiosperms
- Clade: Eudicots
- Clade: Asterids
- Order: Ericales
- Family: Polemoniaceae
- Genus: Leptosiphon
- Species: L. androsaceus

Binomial name
- Leptosiphon androsaceus Benth.

Synonyms
- Linanthus androsaceus

= Leptosiphon androsaceus =

Species of flowering plant

Leptosiphon androsaceus (syn. Linanthus androsaceus) is a species of flowering plant in the phlox family known by the common name of false babystars. It is an annual herb that is endemic to California.

== Distribution and habitat ==
The plant is endemic to California, primarily in the San Francisco Bay Area, and also in the California Coast Ranges of northern and central California, the Southern Sierra Nevada, and the Peninsular Ranges and Transverse Ranges of southern California.

It grows below 1,200 metres (3,900 ft) in chaparral, oak woodland, and grassland habitats.

Similar species are: Leptosiphon latisectus, endemic to the Outer Northern California Coast Ranges; and Leptosiphon rosaceus, endemic to Central Coast and Bay Area shorelines.

== Description ==
Leptosiphon androsaceus is an annual herb producing a hairy stem from 5–45 centimetres (2.0–17.7 in) long, often growing erect. The oppositely arranged leaves are each divided into lobes up to 3 centimeters long and oval in shape to linear to needlelike.

The tip of the stem is occupied by an inflorescence of flowers one to three centimeters wide, usually pink or lavender with yellow or white throats. This plant is similar to its relative, true babystars (Leptosiphon bicolor).

== Human uses ==
The species is cultivated as an ornamental plant for the small, colorful blooms it produces.

== See also ==
- Flora of the California chaparral and woodlands
- List of California native plants
