= Linanthus concinnus =

Conservation status
- Imperiled (NatureServe)

Scientific classification
- Kingdom: Plantae
- Clade: Tracheophytes
- Clade: Angiosperms
- Clade: Eudicots
- Clade: Asterids
- Order: Ericales
- Family: Polemoniaceae
- Genus: Linanthus
- Species: L. concinnus

Binomial name
- Linanthus concinnus Milliken

Species of flowering plant

Linanthus concinnus is a species of flowering plant in the phlox family known by the common name San Gabriel linanthus. It is endemic to the San Gabriel Mountains in the Los Angeles area, where it occurs in dry, rocky habitat in chaparral and forest habitat. This is a small annual herb producing a thin, hairy, glandular stem no more than about 12 centimeters tall. The leaves are divided into narrow, threadlike linear lobes up to 1.5 centimeters long. The inflorescence is a cluster of 3 to 7 funnel-shaped flowers. The lobes of the corolla are up to a centimeter long and white with 2 magenta marks at the base of each.
