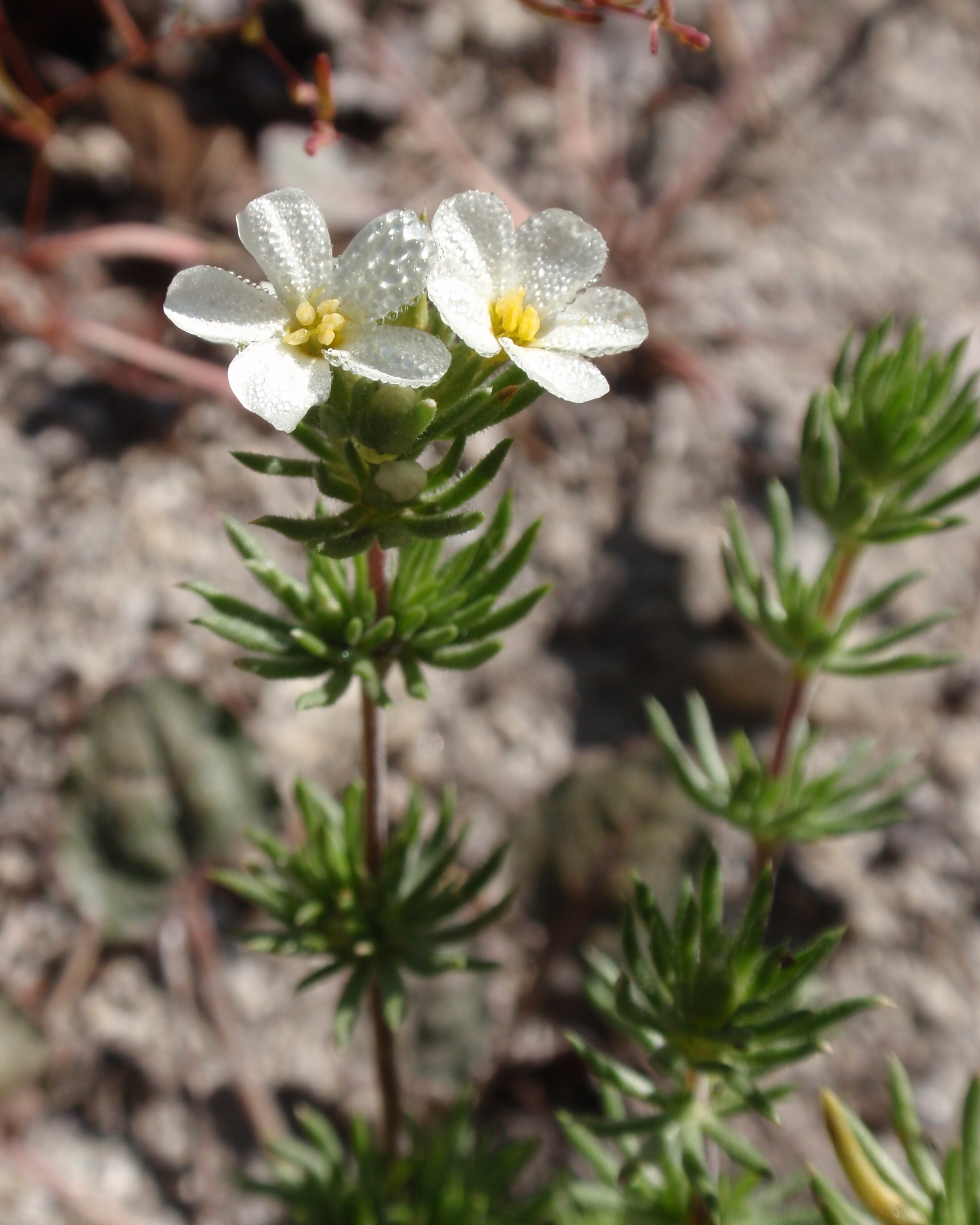

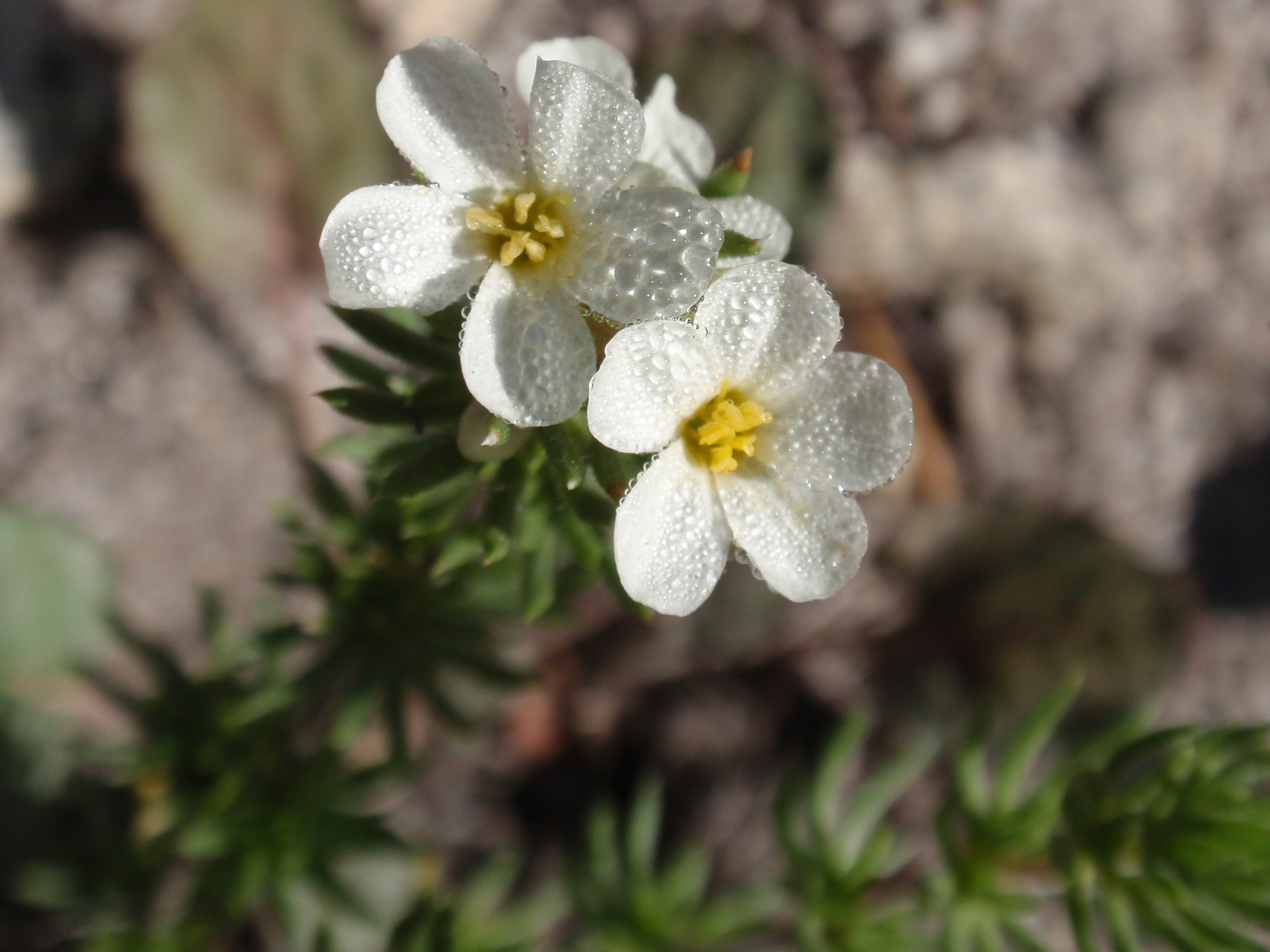
- Leptosiphon pachyphyllus in Little Lakes Valley, California

Scientific classification
- Kingdom: Plantae
- Clade: Embryophytes
- Clade: Tracheophytes
- Clade: Spermatophytes
- Clade: Angiosperms
- Clade: Eudicots
- Clade: Asterids
- Order: Ericales
- Family: Polemoniaceae
- Genus: Leptosiphon
- Species: L. pachyphyllus

Binomial name
- Leptosiphon pachyphyllus (R.Patt.) J.M.Porter & L.A.Johnson

Synonyms
- Linanthus pachyphyllus

= Leptosiphon pachyphyllus =

Species of flowering plant

Leptosiphon pachyphyllus (syn. Linanthus pachyphyllus) is a species of flowering plant in the phlox family, known by the common name Sierra linanthus.

== Distribution and habitat ==
The plant is endemic to eastern California, where it grows in the Sierra Nevada, and in the Owens Valley and Glass Mountain areas to the east in the Great Basin region. Its habitat is generally open woodland and forest areas, at elevations from 1,700–2,500 metres (5,600–8,200 ft).

== Description ==
Leptosiphon pachyphyllus is a perennial herb, nearly identical to its relative, Leptosiphon nuttallii, but may grow slightly larger. It produces a hairy stem 10–20 centimetres (3.9–7.9 in) tall. It is lined with leaves, each divided into five linear lobes.

The inflorescence is a cluster of funnel-shaped white flowers with yellow throats and pale yellow tubular bases over 1 centimetre (0.39 in) long. The bloom period is June through September.
