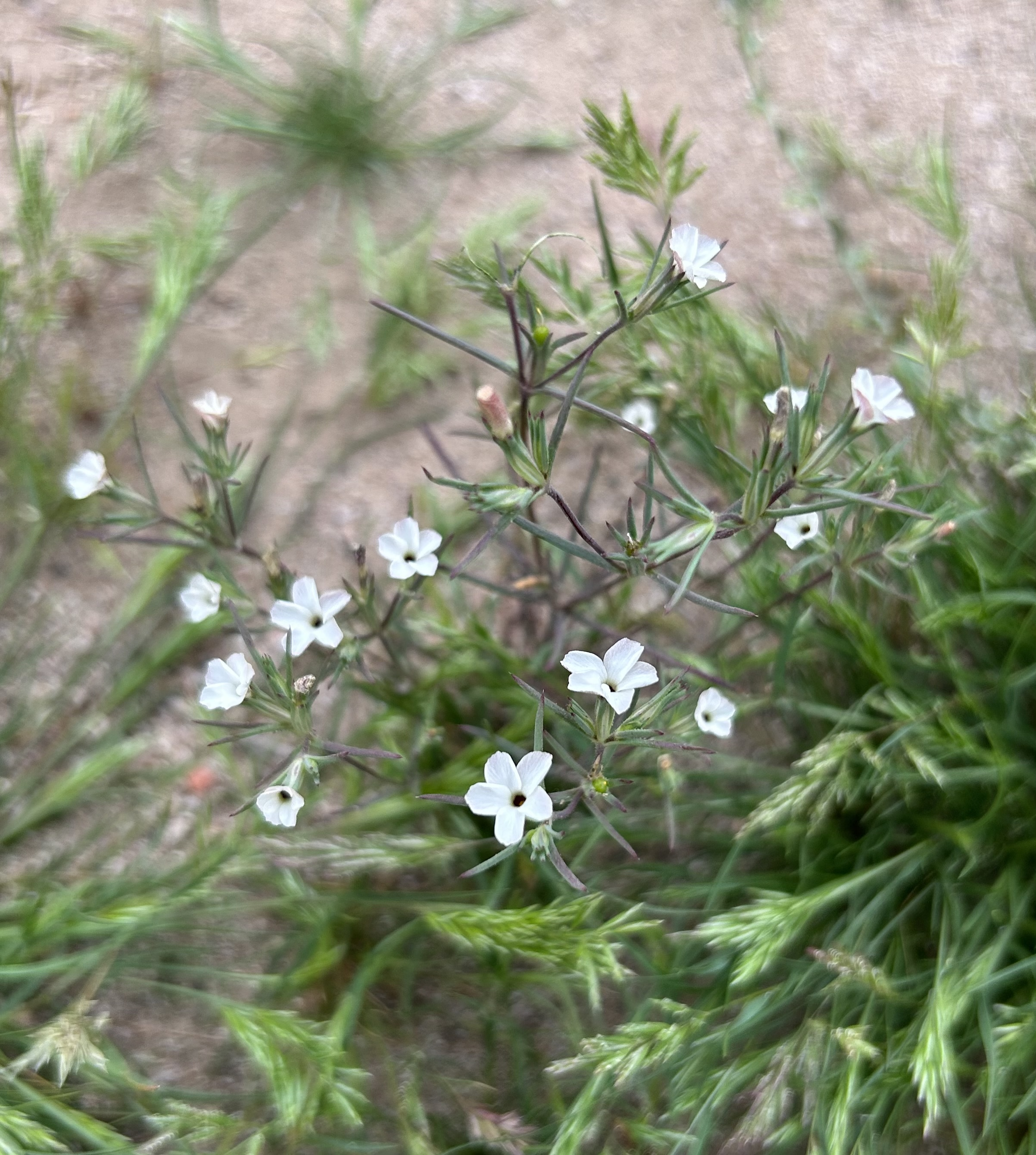
- Linanthus bigelovii

Scientific classification
- Kingdom: Plantae
- Clade: Tracheophytes
- Clade: Angiosperms
- Clade: Eudicots
- Clade: Asterids
- Order: Ericales
- Family: Polemoniaceae
- Genus: Linanthus
- Species: L. bigelovii

Binomial name
- Linanthus bigelovii (A.Gray) Greene

= Linanthus bigelovii =

Species of flowering plant

Linanthus bigelovii is a species of flowering plant in the phlox family known by the common name Bigelow's linanthus. It is native to the southwestern United States and northern Mexico where it grows mainly in dry habitat, such as the Sonoran and Mojave Deserts. This is an annual herb producing a thin stem up to about 20 centimetres tall. The leaves are linear in shape to needle-like and unlobed, measuring 1 to 3 centimetres long. The inflorescence is a small array of white flowers with lobes just under a centimetre long, and black centres. They are sometimes lavender-tinted and open in the evening.
