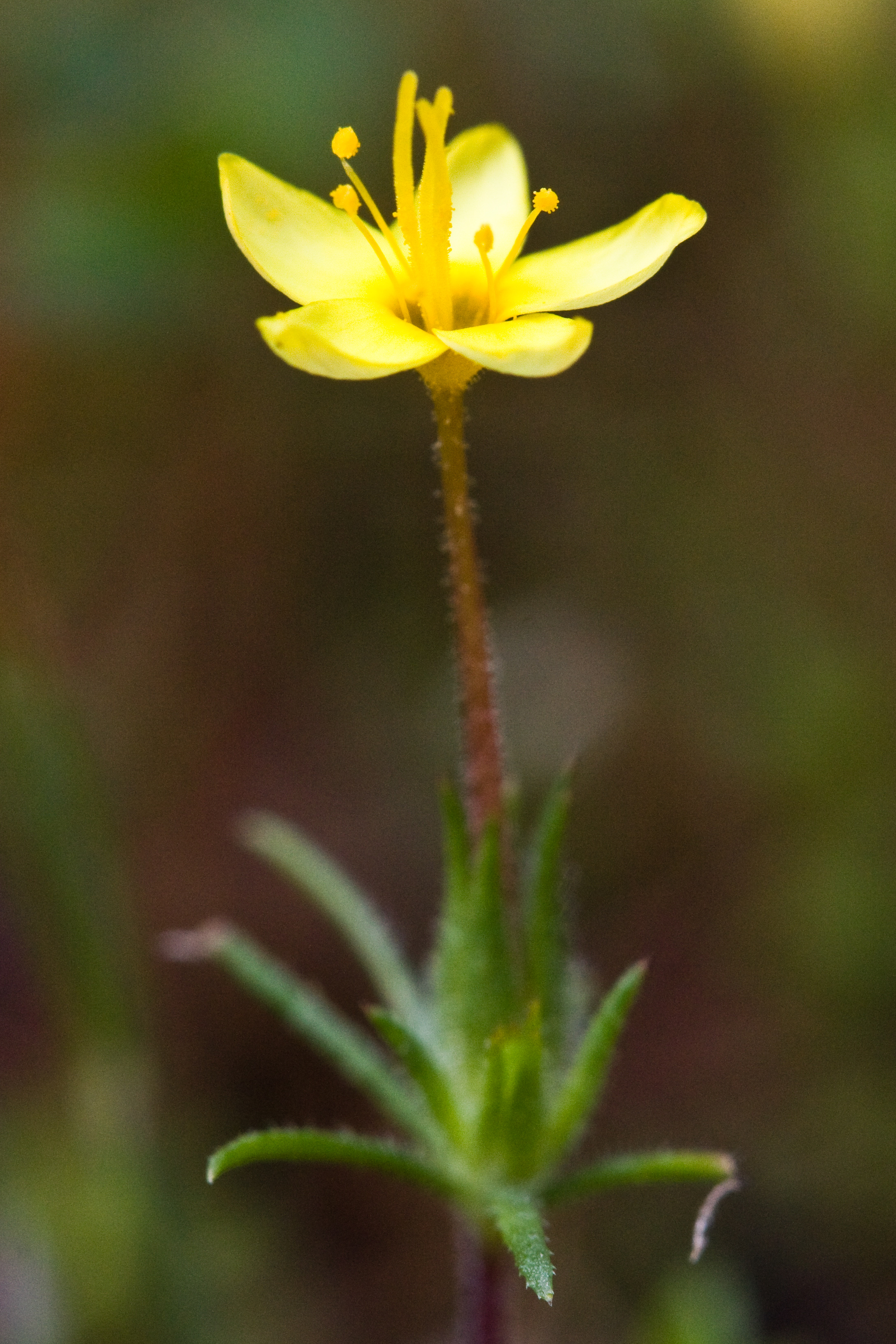

Scientific classification
- Kingdom: Plantae
- Clade: Tracheophytes
- Clade: Angiosperms
- Clade: Eudicots
- Clade: Asterids
- Order: Ericales
- Family: Polemoniaceae
- Genus: Leptosiphon
- Species: L. acicularis

Binomial name
- Leptosiphon acicularis (Greene) Jeps.

Synonyms
- Linanthus acicularis

= Leptosiphon acicularis =

Species of flowering plant

Leptosiphon acicularis (syn. Linanthus acicularis) is a species of flowering plant in the phlox family known by the common names bristly linanthus and bristly leptosiphon.

== Distribution ==
The plant is endemic to northern California in the California Coast Ranges, from the San Francisco Bay Area northwards. It is a found below 700 metres (2,300 ft) in chaparral, oak woodland, and coastal prairie habitats.

It is a California Department of Fish and Wildlife and IUCN listed Vulnerable species, and is on the California Native Plant Society Inventory of Rare and Endangered Plants.

== Description ==
Leptosiphon acicularis is an annual herb producing a hairy stem no more than about 15 centimeters tall. The oppositely arranged leaves are each divided into very narrow bristlelike lobes up to a centimeter long.

The tip of the stem has an inflorescence of one or more tiny yellow flowers surrounded by many needlelike sepals. The bloom period is April to May.

The specific epithet, acicularis, is derived from Latin and means "needle-shaped".

== See also ==
- Flora of the California chaparral and woodlands
