= Linanthus inyoensis =

Scientific classification
- Kingdom: Plantae
- Clade: Tracheophytes
- Clade: Angiosperms
- Clade: Eudicots
- Clade: Asterids
- Order: Ericales
- Family: Polemoniaceae
- Genus: Linanthus
- Species: L. inyoensis

Binomial name
- Linanthus inyoensis (I.M. Johnst.) J.M. Porter & L.A. Johnson

Species of flowering plant

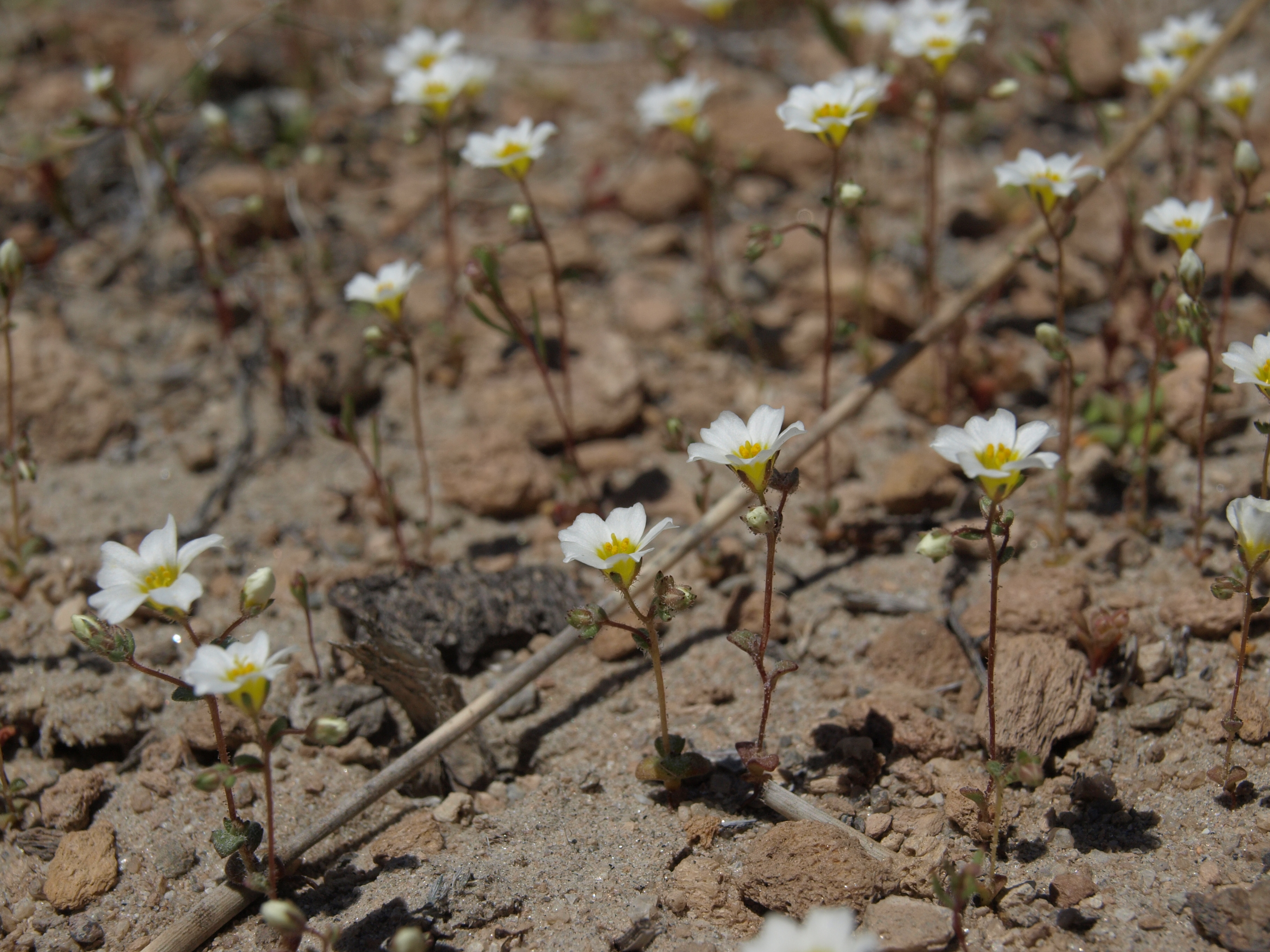
Inyo gilia, Linanthus inyoensis

Linanthus inyoensis (formerly Gilia inyoensis) is a species of flowering plant in the phlox family known by the common name Inyo gilia.

It is native to eastern California and western Nevada, where it is a common member of the flora in several types of habitat at the western edge of the Great Basin where it meets the Sierra Nevada into the High Sierra Nevada, Inyo Mountains, and White Mountains.

Description

Linanthus inyoensis is a petite herb, growing up to 10 centimeters tall. Its hair-thin stem glandular on the upper parts and coated in white hairs below. The leaves are just a few millimeters long, oval in shape, sometimes with a few teeth on the edges, and somewhat hairy.

The inflorescence generally bears one pair of small, white flowers with tiny stamens protruding from their yellow throats.
