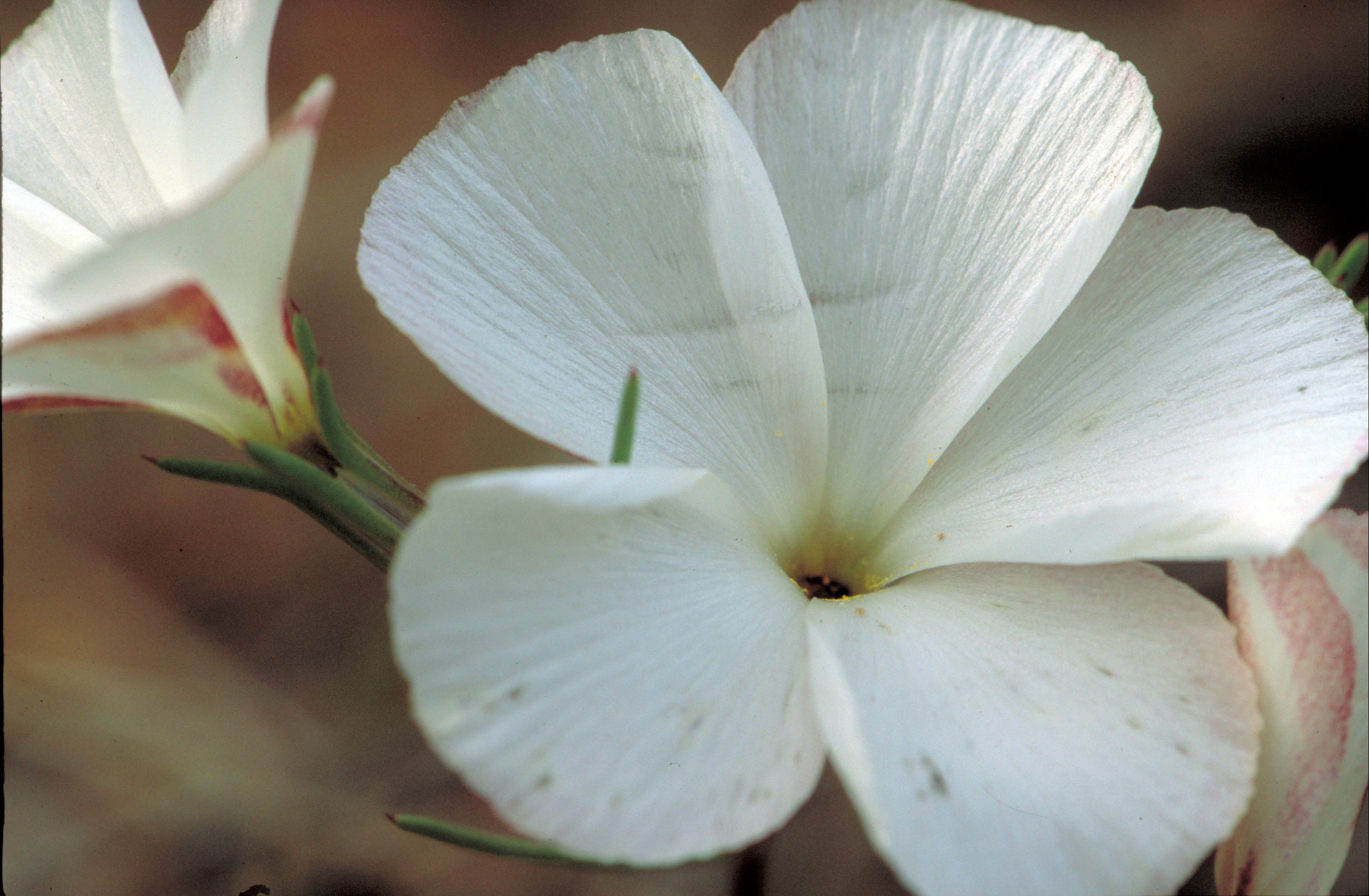

Scientific classification
- Kingdom: Plantae
- Clade: Tracheophytes
- Clade: Angiosperms
- Clade: Eudicots
- Clade: Asterids
- Order: Ericales
- Family: Polemoniaceae
- Genus: Linanthus
- Species: L. dichotomus

Binomial name
- Linanthus dichotomus Benth.

= Linanthus dichotomus =

Species of flowering plant

Linanthus dichotomus is a species of flowering plant in the phlox family known by the common name evening-snow. It is native to western North America, including most of the southwestern United States, where it is a common member of the flora in a number of habitat types. It is often found on the serpentine soils of California. This is an annual herb producing several thin, waxy, erect stems up to 20 centimeters tall. The leaves are divided into linear lobes 1 or 2 centimeters long. The inflorescence produces a cyme of vespertine flowers which unroll into funnel-shaped corollas. The white lobes are just over a centimeter long and have purple shading on the undersides.
