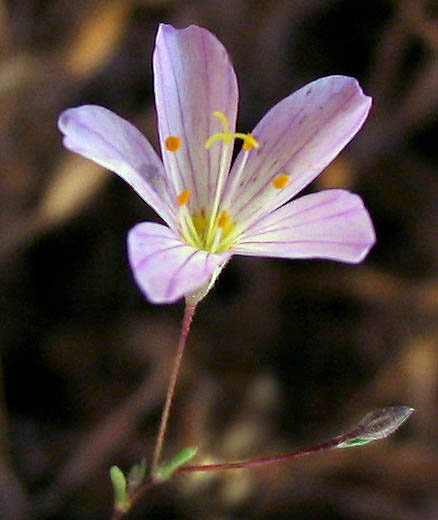

Scientific classification
- Kingdom: Plantae
- Clade: Embryophytes
- Clade: Tracheophytes
- Clade: Spermatophytes
- Clade: Angiosperms
- Clade: Eudicots
- Clade: Asterids
- Order: Ericales
- Family: Polemoniaceae
- Genus: Leptosiphon
- Species: L. liniflorus

Binomial name
- Leptosiphon liniflorus (Benth.) J.M.Porter & L.A.Johnson

Synonyms
- Linanthus liniflorus; L. pharnaceoides

= Leptosiphon liniflorus =

Species of flowering plant

Leptosiphon liniflorus is a species of flowering plant in the phlox family known by the common name narrowflower flaxflower.

It is native to the western United States from Washington and Idaho, through Oregon and Nevada, and across California. It grows below 1,700 metres (5,600 ft), in many types of habitats, including chaparral, oak woodland, grasslands, yellow pine forest, and on serpentine soils.

== Description ==
Leptosiphon liniflorus is an annual herb producing a thin stem 10–50 centimetres (3.9–19.7 in) tall. The leaves are divided into needle-like linear lobes each up to 3 cm (1.2 in) in length.

The inflorescence is an open array of funnel-shaped, with purple-veined white flowers having corolla lobes each up to 1 centimetre (0.39 in) long. The bloom period is April to June.
