= Leptosiphon filipes =

Scientific classification
- Kingdom: Plantae
- Clade: Tracheophytes
- Clade: Angiosperms
- Clade: Eudicots
- Clade: Asterids
- Order: Ericales
- Family: Polemoniaceae
- Genus: Leptosiphon
- Species: L. filipes

Binomial name
- Leptosiphon filipes (Benth.) J.M. Porter & L.A. Johnson

Synonyms
- Linanthus filipes

Species of flowering plant

Leptosiphon filipes (syn. Linanthus filipes) is a species of flowering plant in the phlox family known by the common name thread linanthus.

== Distribution ==
It is endemic to California, primarily in the foothills of the western Sierra Nevada, and also the Inner Northern California Coast Ranges. It is found below 1,300 metres (4,300 ft), in oak woodland, grassland, and Yellow pine forest habitats.

== Description ==
Leptosiphon filipes is a petite annual herb producing a threadlike stem up to 20 centimeters long. The oppositely arranged leaves are each divided into linear lobes just a few millimeters long.

The inflorescence at the tip of the stem is generally composed of a single tiny flower a few millimeters wide. It is pink or white with a yellow throat. The bloom period is April to July.
