= Leptosiphon bolanderi =

Scientific classification
- Kingdom: Plantae
- Clade: Tracheophytes
- Clade: Angiosperms
- Clade: Eudicots
- Clade: Asterids
- Order: Ericales
- Family: Polemoniaceae
- Genus: Leptosiphon
- Species: L. bolanderi

Binomial name
- Leptosiphon bolanderi (A.Gray) J.M.Porter & L.A.Johnson

Synonyms
- Linanthus bolanderi Linanthus bakeri

Species of flowering plant

Leptosiphon bolanderi (syn. Linanthus bolanderi) is a species of flowering plant in the phlox family known by the common name Bolander's linanthus.

== Distribution ==
The plant is native to the West Coast of the United States, from 200–1,700 metres (660–5,580 ft) in elevation. In California it is native to the Sierra Nevada and Northern California Coast Ranges, in chaparral, oak woodland, and Yellow pine forest habitats.

== Description ==
Leptosiphon bolanderi is an annual herb producing a hairy, threadlike stem no more than about 20 centimeters tall. The oppositely arranged leaves are each divided into very narrow needlelike lobes just a few millimeters long.

The tip of the stem has an inflorescence of usually a single flower with a tubular purple or pink throat tinted yellow inside and enclosed in glandular sepals. The corolla has white or pink lobes a few millimeters wide. The bloom period is from March to July, depending on elevation and latitude.
