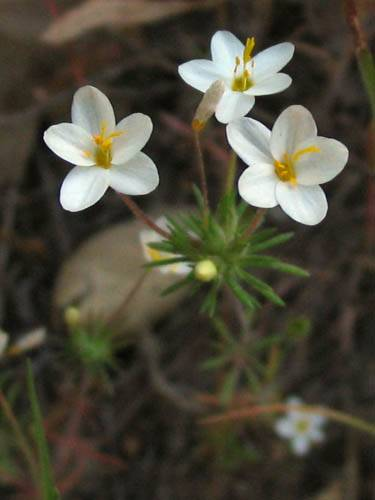

Scientific classification
- Kingdom: Plantae
- Clade: Tracheophytes
- Clade: Angiosperms
- Clade: Eudicots
- Clade: Asterids
- Order: Ericales
- Family: Polemoniaceae
- Genus: Leptosiphon
- Species: L. parviflorus

Binomial name
- Leptosiphon parviflorus (Benth.) J.M.Porter & L.A.Johnson

Synonyms
- Linanthus parviflorus

= Leptosiphon parviflorus =

Species of flowering plant

Leptosiphon parviflorus (syn. Linanthus parviflorus) is a species of flowering plant in the phlox family known by the common name variable linanthus.

== Distribution and habitat ==
The plant is endemic to California, growing from sea level to 1,200 metres (3,900 ft) in elevation. It is widespread and common in many types of habitats, including chaparral, oak woodlands, mixed evergreen forests, and montane coniferous forests.

Mountain ranges it is found in include the Sierra Nevada, California Coast Ranges, Peninsular Ranges, southern Cascade Range, and Transverse Ranges. It is also native to four of the Channel Islands of California.

== Description ==
Leptosiphon parviflorus is an annual herb. As its common name suggests, the plant is variable in appearance. The stem may be just a few centimeters long or up to 25 centimeters in erect height. The leaves are divided into several lobes, often linear in shape, and 1 to 2.5 centimeters long.

The inflorescence is a cluster of several flowers which may be nearly any color, often shades of yellow, pink, or white. Each flower has a long, very narrow tube which may exceed 3 centimeters. It expands into a yellowish throat and a flat corolla with purplish markings at the base of each lobe. The bloom period is March to June.

== See also ==
- Endemic flora of California
- Flora of the California chaparral and woodlands
