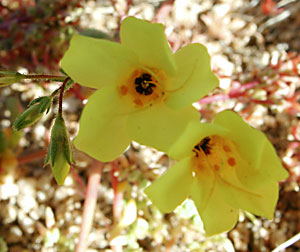
- Leptosiphon aureus

Scientific classification
- Kingdom: Plantae
- Clade: Tracheophytes
- Clade: Angiosperms
- Clade: Eudicots
- Clade: Asterids
- Order: Ericales
- Family: Polemoniaceae
- Genus: Leptosiphon; Benth. (1833)

Species
- 32; see text

Synonyms
- Dactylophyllum Spach (1840); Linanthastrum Ewan (1942); Siphonella A.Heller (1912), nom. illeg.

= Leptosiphon =

Genus of flowering plants

Leptosiphon is a genus of flowering plants in the Polemoniaceae family. Many included species were formerly classified as members of the genus Linanthus. Some species of this genus are grown as ornamental plants.

== Species ==
32 species are accepted.

- Leptosiphon acicularis Jeps. - bristly linanthus
- Leptosiphon ambiguus (Rattan) J.M.Porter & L.A.Johnson - serpentine linanthus
- Leptosiphon androsaceus Benth. - false babystars
- Leptosiphon bicolor Nutt. - true babystars
- Leptosiphon bolanderi (A.Gray) J.M.Porter & L.A.Johnson - Bolander's linanthus
- Leptosiphon breviculus (A.Gray) J.M.Porter & L.A.Johnson - Mojave linanthus
- Leptosiphon chrysanthus J.M.Porter
- Leptosiphon ciliatus (Benth.) Jeps. - whiskerbrush
- Leptosiphon croceus (Eastw.) Strother & Kersh
- Leptosiphon filipes (Benth.) J.M.Porter & L.A.Johnson - thread linanthus
- Leptosiphon floribundus (A.Gray) J.M.Porter & L.A.Johnson - manyflower linanthus
- Leptosiphon grandiflorus Benth. - largeflower linanthus
- Leptosiphon harknessii (Curran) J.M.Porter & L.A.Johnson - Harkness flaxflower
- Leptosiphon jamauensis (Moran) J.M.Porter & L.A.Johnson
- Leptosiphon jepsonii (Schemske & Goodw.) J.M.Porter & L.A.Johnson - Jepson's linanthus
- Leptosiphon latisectus (E.G.Buxton) J.M.Porter & L.A.Johnson - Coast Range linanthus
- Leptosiphon laxus (Vasey & Rose) J.M.Porter & L.A.Johnson
- Leptosiphon lemmonii (A.Gray) J.M.Porter & L.A.Johnson - Lemmon's linanthus
- Leptosiphon liniflorus (Benth.) J.M.Porter & L.A.Johnson - narrowflower flaxflower
- Leptosiphon melingii (Wiggins) J.M.Porter & L.A.Johnson
- Leptosiphon montanus (Greene) J.M.Porter & L.A.Johnson - mustang clover
- Leptosiphon nudatus (Greene) J.M.Porter & L.A.Johnson - Tehachapi linanthus
- Leptosiphon nuttallii (A.Gray) J.M.Porter & L.A.Johnson - Nuttall's linanthus
- Leptosiphon oblanceolatus (Brand) J.M.Porter & L.A.Johnson - Sierra Nevada linanthus
- Leptosiphon pachyphyllus (R.Patt.) J.M.Porter & L.A.Johnson - Sierra linanthus
- Leptosiphon parviflorus Benth. - variable linanthus (synonym Leptosiphon aureus - golden linanthus)
- Leptosiphon pusillus (Benth.) J.M.Porter & L.A.Johnson
- Leptosiphon pygmaeus (Brand) J.M.Porter & L.A.Johnson - pygmy linanthus
- Leptosiphon rattanii (A.Gray) J.M.Porter & L.A.Johnson - Rattan linanthus
- Leptosiphon rosaceus (Hook.f.) Battaglia
- Leptosiphon septentrionalis (H.Mason) J.M.Porter & L.A.Johnson - northern linanthus
- Leptosiphon serrulatus (Greene) J.M.Porter & L.A.Johnson - Madera linanthus
