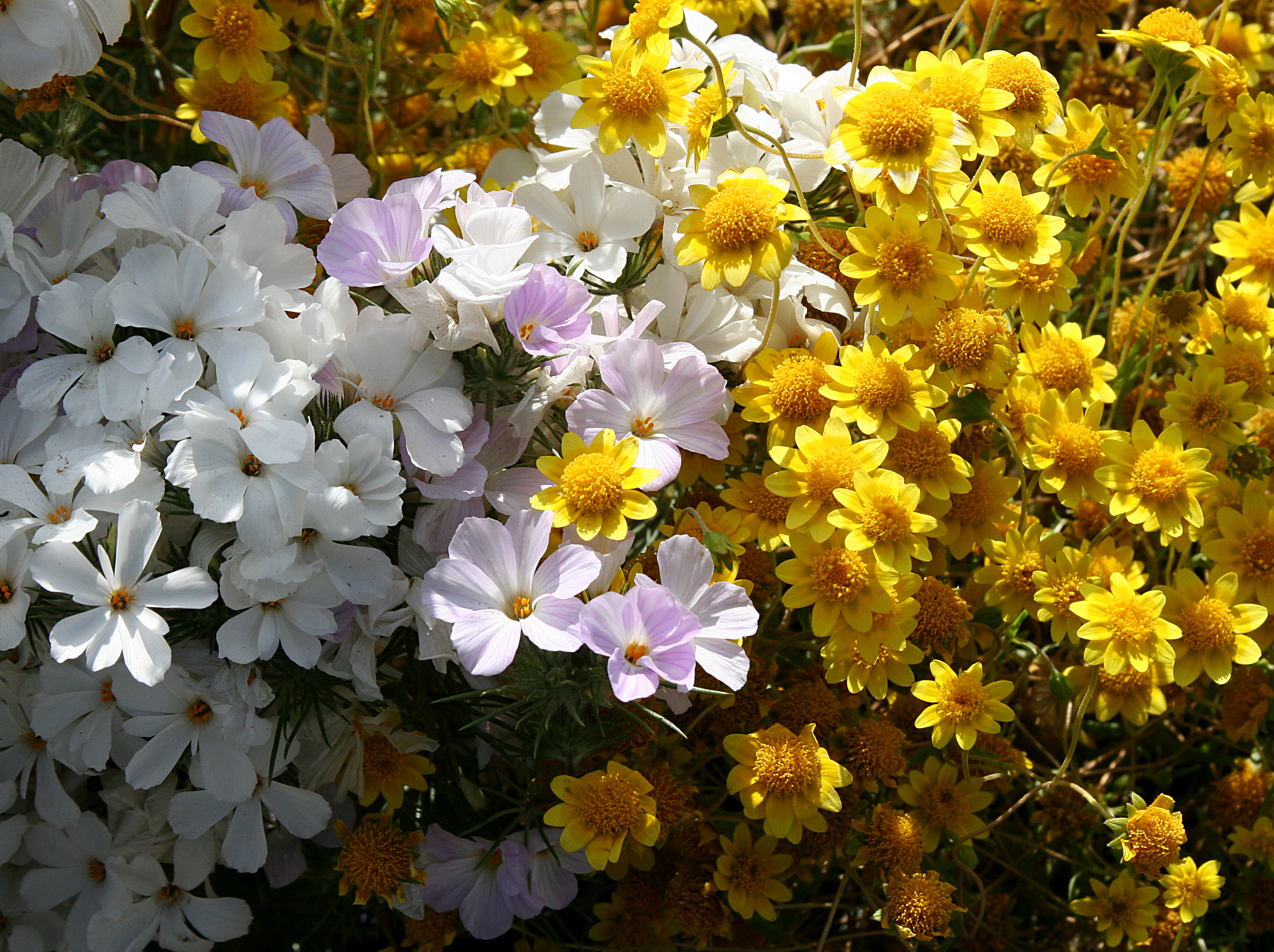
- with goldfields (Lasthenia californica)

Scientific classification
- Kingdom: Plantae
- Clade: Tracheophytes
- Clade: Angiosperms
- Clade: Eudicots
- Clade: Asterids
- Order: Ericales
- Family: Polemoniaceae
- Genus: Leptosiphon
- Species: L. grandiflorus

Binomial name
- Leptosiphon grandiflorus (Benth.) J.M. Porter & L.A. Johnson

Synonyms
- Linanthus grandiflorus

= Leptosiphon grandiflorus =

Species of flowering plant

Leptosiphon grandiflorus (syn. Linanthus grandiflorus) is a species of flowering plant in the phlox family known by the common names large-flower linanthus and large flowered leptosiphon.

== Distribution ==
It is endemic to California, where it is known from the California Coast Ranges of the Central Coast and the San Francisco Bay Area. It grows below 1,200 metres (3,900 ft) in chaparral, coastal prairie, coastal sage scrub, closed-cone pine forest, grassland, and oak woodland habitats.

It is California Department of Fish and Wildlife and IUCN listed Vulnerable species, and is on the California Native Plant Society Inventory of Rare and Endangered Plants. Its current range is uncertain because many known occurrences of the plant have been extirpated.

== Description ==
Leptosiphon grandiflorus is an annual herb producing a hairy stem with occasional leaves which are each divided into linear lobes up to 3 centimeters (1.2 in) long.

The inflorescence at the tip of the stem is a loose cluster of a few white or pinkish funnel-shaped flowers with lobes up to 1.5 centimeters (0.59 in) long. The bloom period is April to July.

== See also ==
- Flora of the California chaparral and woodlands
