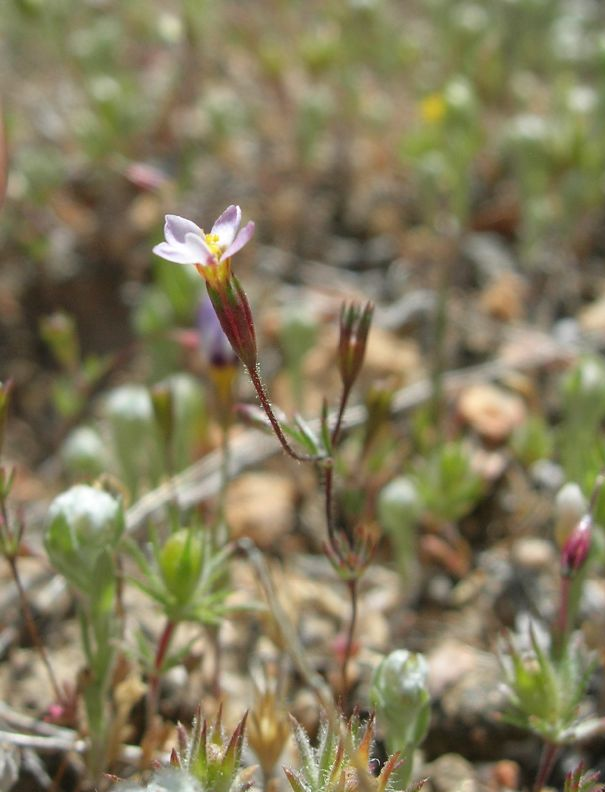

Scientific classification
- Kingdom: Plantae
- Clade: Tracheophytes
- Clade: Angiosperms
- Clade: Eudicots
- Clade: Asterids
- Order: Ericales
- Family: Polemoniaceae
- Genus: Leptosiphon
- Species: L. pygmaeus

Binomial name
- Leptosiphon pygmaeus (Brand) J.M.Porter & L.A.Johnson

Synonyms
- Linanthus pygmaeus

= Leptosiphon pygmaeus =

Species of flowering plant

Leptosiphon pygmaeus (syn. Linanthus pygmaeus) is a species of flowering plant in the phlox family known by the common name pygmy linanthus.

== Distribution ==
It is native across much of California, including the western Sierra Nevada, Central Valley, California Coast Ranges, Transverse Ranges, and Peninsular Ranges. It is also native to the California Channel Islands (U.S.), and Guadalupe Island off the coast of Baja California (México).

It can be found below 3,000 metres (9,800 ft) in open or wooded areas in hills, mountains, and valleys, and in many types of habitats including chaparral, oak woodland, grassland, and yellow pine forest.

== Description ==
Leptosiphon pygmaeus is a petite annual herb growing 2–30 centimetres (0.79–11.81 in) high. It has tiny threadlike leaves.

The inflorescence is an open array of minute light to deep pink flowers 7–10 millimetres (0.28–0.39 in) wide, with rich yellow throats. The bloom period is March to July.

=== Subspecies ===
- Leptosiphon pygmaeus subsp. continentalis — mainland distribution in coastal ranges.
- Leptosiphon pygmaeus subsp. pygmaeus — Pygmy desert-gold, endemic to coastal sage scrub on San Clemente Island (California) and Guadalupe Island (Baja California). It is a Critically endangered species.
