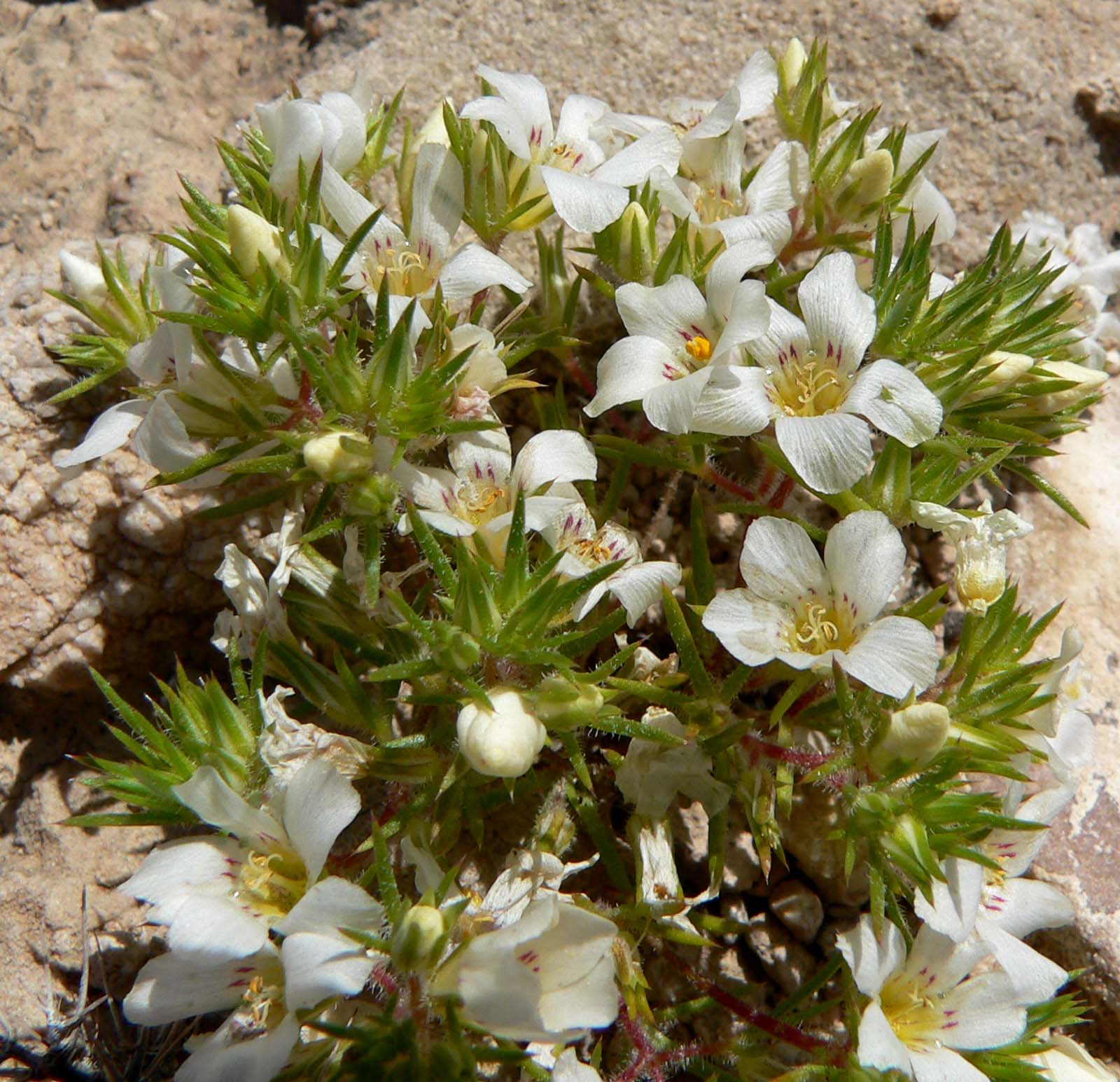

Scientific classification
- Kingdom: Plantae
- Clade: Tracheophytes
- Clade: Angiosperms
- Clade: Eudicots
- Clade: Asterids
- Order: Ericales
- Family: Polemoniaceae
- Genus: Linanthus
- Species: L. demissus

Binomial name
- Linanthus demissus (A.Gray) Greene

= Linanthus demissus =

Species of flowering plant

Linanthus demissus (humble gilia or desertsnow) is a small flowering plant found in the Mojave Desert of the southwestern United States, from southeastern California east to Arizona and southern Utah.

== Description ==
It is an annual plant with decumbent (creeping) growth to 2–10 cm tall with downy stems. The leaves are opposite, 6–10 mm long and 1–2 mm broad, with an acuminate apex. It has fragrant white flowers with petals that twist much like a windmill, just a few millimeters across. A key distinguishing characteristic is the pair of small purple lines or wedges at the base of each corolla lobe.

== Habitat ==
It is inconspicuous when not in flower, and tends to blend in with gravel and rock pebbles. It is found on limestone desert pavements and in sandy washes, and can be found in large numbers around Death Valley National Park and the Mojave National Preserve south of Interstate 15.
