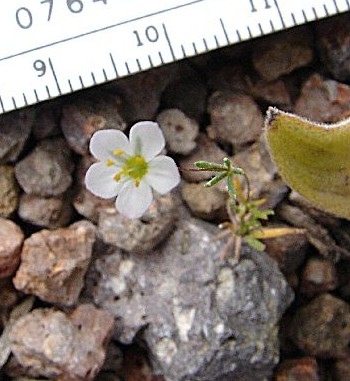

Conservation status
- Secure (NatureServe)

Scientific classification
- Kingdom: Plantae
- Clade: Embryophytes
- Clade: Tracheophytes
- Clade: Spermatophytes
- Clade: Angiosperms
- Clade: Eudicots
- Clade: Asterids
- Order: Ericales
- Family: Polemoniaceae
- Genus: Leptosiphon
- Species: L. septentrionalis

Binomial name
- Leptosiphon septentrionalis (H.Mason) J.M.Porter & L.A.Johnson

Synonyms
- Gilia septentrionalis; Linanthus harknessii var. septentrionalis; Linanthus septentrionalis

= Leptosiphon septentrionalis =

Plant species in the phlox family

Leptosiphon septentrionalis is a species of flowering plant in the phlox family known by the common name northern desert-gold.

== Distribution ==
The plant is native to western North America, from 2,000–3,000 metres (6,600–9,800 ft) in elevation. It is found in Western Canada, the Northwestern United States, and the Great Basin region in eastern California, Nevada, and Utah.

It grows in several types of habitat, including sagebrush scrub, Pinyon-juniper woodlands, and Yellow pine forests.

== Description ==
Leptosiphon septentrionalis is a small annual herb producing a hairy, threadlike stem up to 30 centimetres (12 in) tall. The leaves are divided into tiny threadlike lobes.

The inflorescence is generally made up of a single funnel-shaped flower with a yellow throat and a tiny white or pale blue corolla less than 1 centimetre (0.39 in) wide. The bloom period is May to July.

== Taxonomy ==
In 1938 a new species of Linanthus was scientifically described by Herbert Louis Mason, which he named Linanthus septentrionalis. In 1943 Willis Linn Jepson and Virginia Long Bailey (1908-2003) described it as a variety of Linanthus harknessii and Harold St. John proposed moving it to Gilia. However, it was placed in Leptosiphon by James Mark Porter and Leigh Alma Johnson in 2000, the accepted name according to Plants of the World Online. However, the name Linanthus septentrionalis is still used in some sources such as NatureServe. Together with its genus it is part of the Polemoniaceae and has no subspecies.

=== Names ===
The Botanical Latin species name, septentrionalis, means 'northern'. Similarly, it is known by the common name northern desert-gold.
