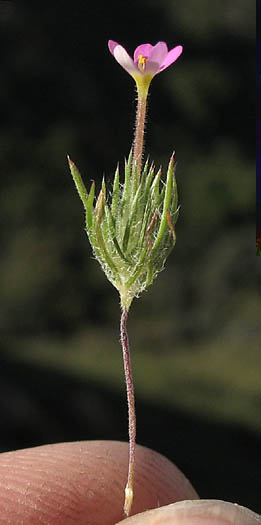

Scientific classification
- Kingdom: Plantae
- Clade: Tracheophytes
- Clade: Angiosperms
- Clade: Eudicots
- Clade: Asterids
- Order: Ericales
- Family: Polemoniaceae
- Genus: Leptosiphon
- Species: L. ciliatus

Binomial name
- Leptosiphon ciliatus (Benth.) Jeps.

Synonyms
- Linanthus ciliatus

= Leptosiphon ciliatus =

Species of flowering plant

Leptosiphon ciliatus (syn. Linanthus ciliatus) is a species of flowering plant in the phlox family known by the common name whiskerbrush.

== Distribution ==
It is native to California, Baja California (México), Nevada, and Oregon, growing below 3,000 metres (9,800 ft) in elevation.

It is a common plant in many types of habitats, including chaparral, oak woodland, grassland, yellow pine forest, red fir forest, lodgepole forest, and subalpine forest.

== Description ==
Leptosiphon ciliatus is a hairy annual herb producing a thin stem up to about 30 centimeters tall. The leaves are each divided into needle-like lobes up to 2 centimeters long, with leaf pairs appearing as a cluster of narrow lobes.

The tip of the stem has an inflorescence of one or more flowers each with a long, hairy tube up to 2.5 centimeters long emerging from the leaf-like sepals. The face of the flower is less than a centimeter wide and pale to bright pink with white and yellow coloring and reddish spots on the throat. The bloom period is March to July, depending on altitude and latitude.
