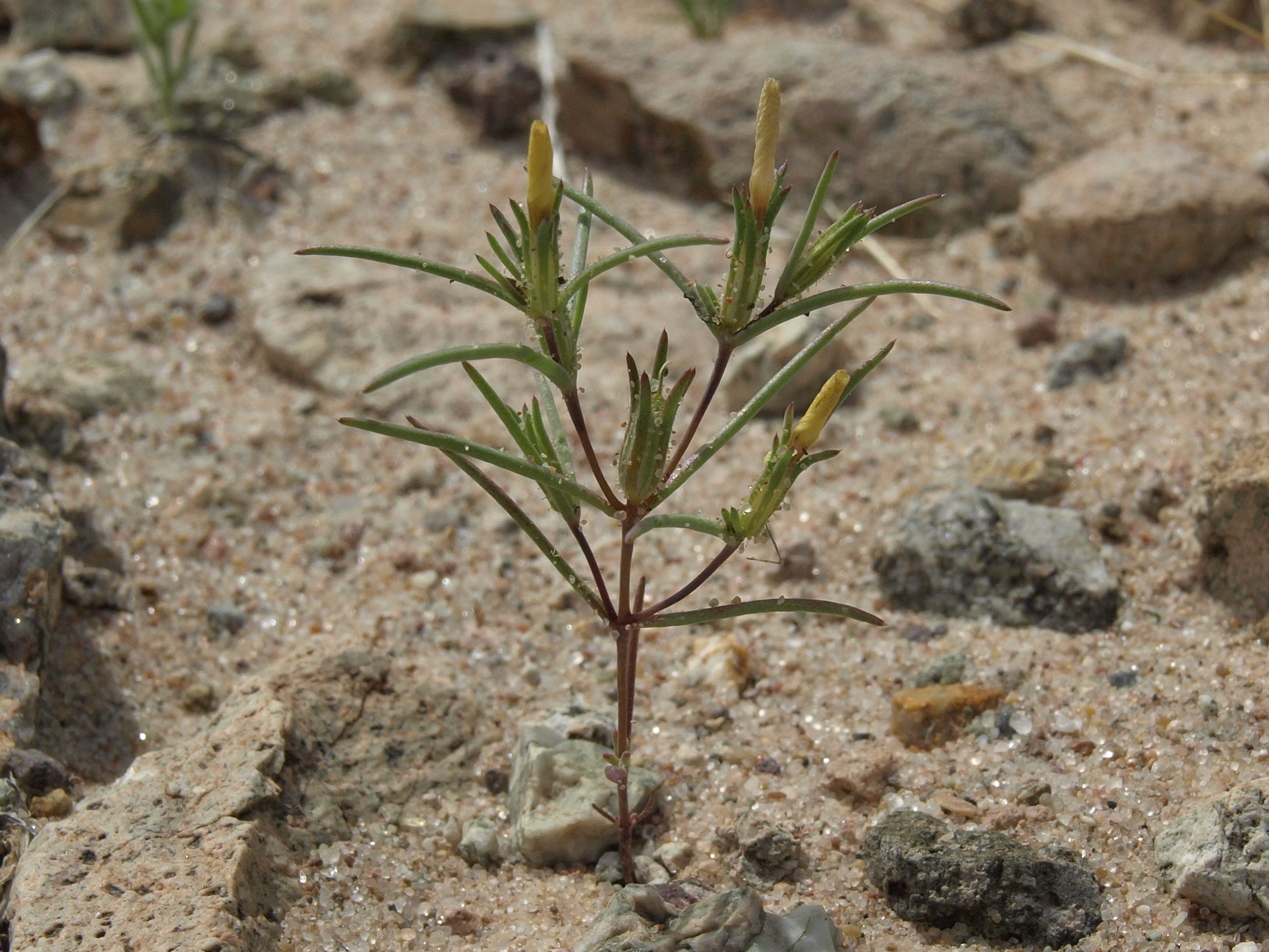
- Jones linanthus, Linanthus jonesii

Scientific classification
- Kingdom: Plantae
- Clade: Tracheophytes
- Clade: Angiosperms
- Clade: Eudicots
- Clade: Asterids
- Order: Ericales
- Family: Polemoniaceae
- Genus: Linanthus
- Species: L. jonesii

Binomial name
- Linanthus jonesii (A.Gray) Greene

= Linanthus jonesii =

Species of flowering plant

Linanthus jonesii is a species of flowering plant in the phlox family known by the common name Jones' linanthus. It is native to the deserts of the southwestern United States and northern Mexico. This is a small annual herb producing a hairy, glandular stem no more than about 15 centimeters tall, with several pairs of needle-like, curving leaves. The inflorescence is an open array of vespertine flowers with throats surrounded by membranous, ribbed sepals with needle-like teeth. The funnel-shaped flowers are under a centimeter wide when open and mostly white in color, with yellowish coloring in the throats and purple tinting on the outer surfaces.
