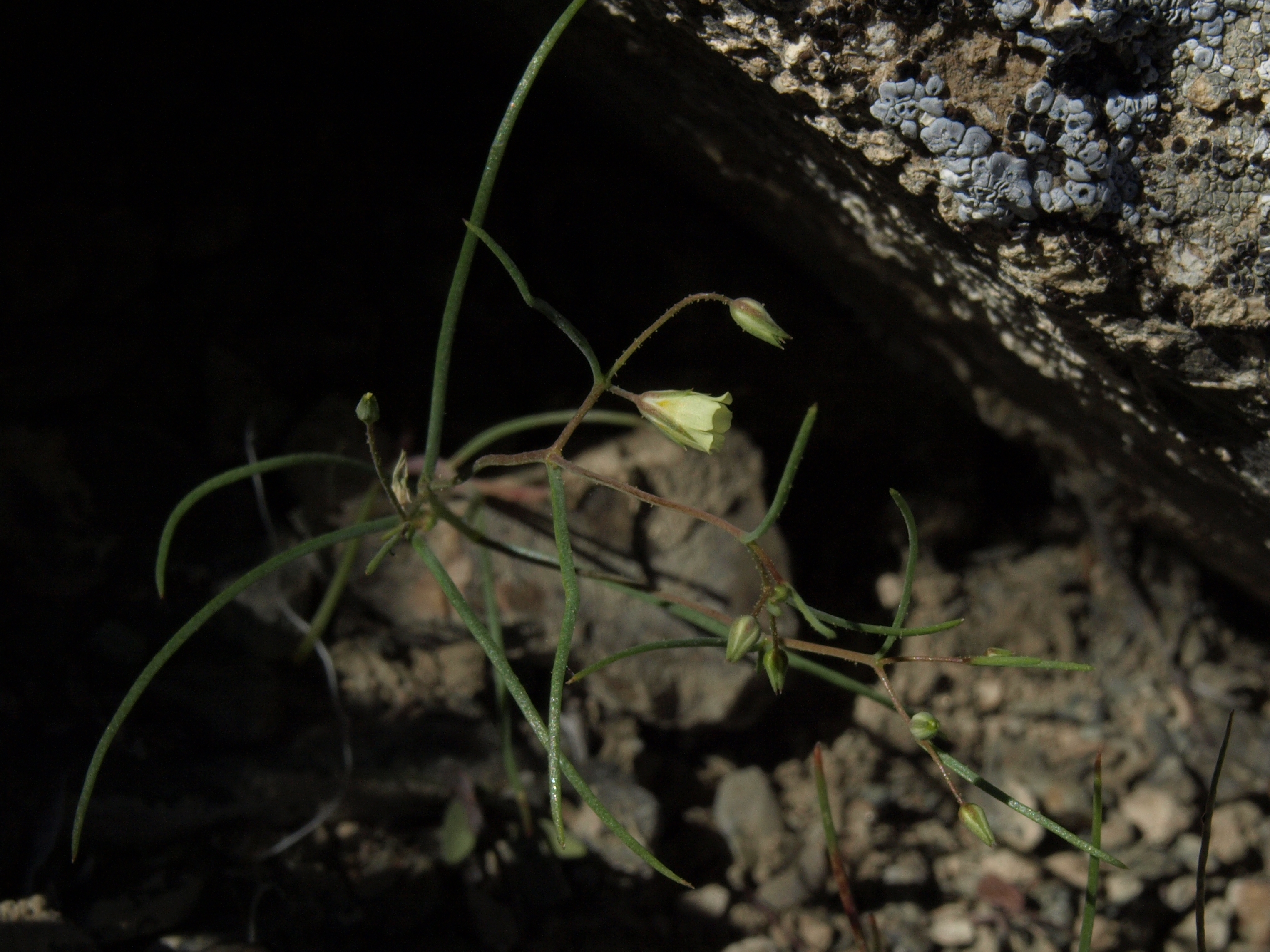

Scientific classification
- Kingdom: Plantae
- Clade: Tracheophytes
- Clade: Angiosperms
- Clade: Eudicots
- Clade: Asterids
- Order: Ericales
- Family: Polemoniaceae
- Genus: Linanthus
- Species: L. filiformis

Binomial name
- Linanthus filiformis (Parry ex A.Gray) J.M.Porter & L.A.Johnson

= Linanthus filiformis =

Species of flowering plant

Linanthus filiformis (formerly Gilia filiformis) is a species of flowering plant in the phlox family known by the common name yellow gilia. It is native to the southwestern United States, where it grows in rocky desert and plateau habitat. This herb produces a threadlike, branching stem not more than about 15 centimeters long. It is generally hairless but may be thinly dotted with glands. The few linear leaves are up to 3 centimeters long and occur along the stem. The inflorescence generally bears one pair of yellow flowers, each flower under a centimeter wide.
