= Linanthus orcuttii =

Scientific classification
- Kingdom: Plantae
- Clade: Tracheophytes
- Clade: Angiosperms
- Clade: Eudicots
- Clade: Asterids
- Order: Ericales
- Family: Polemoniaceae
- Genus: Linanthus
- Species: L. orcuttii

Binomial name
- Linanthus orcuttii (Parry & A.Gray) Jeps.

Species of flowering plant

Linanthus orcuttii is an uncommon species of flowering plant in the phlox family known by the common name Orcutt's linanthus. It is known only from southern California and Baja California, where it grows in chaparral and pine forests in the Peninsular Ranges, the Palomar Mountain and occasionally the San Bernardino Mountains.

== Description ==
Linanthus orcuttii is a petite annual herb producing short, hairy stems no more than about 10 centimeters tall. The leaves are divided into hairy, needlelike lobes several millimeters long. The inflorescence is a small cluster of funnel-shaped flowers with thin, tubular throats opening into corollas barely over a centimeter wide. The flower may be white or shades of blue-purple to pink, with yellow and white throats streaked with tiny purple lines.

== See also ==
- California montane chaparral and woodlands
