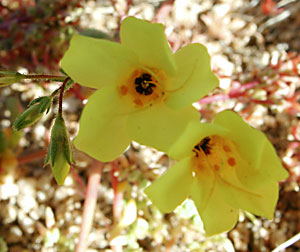

Scientific classification
- Kingdom: Plantae
- Clade: Tracheophytes
- Clade: Angiosperms
- Clade: Eudicots
- Clade: Asterids
- Order: Ericales
- Family: Polemoniaceae
- Genus: Leptosiphon
- Species: L. aureus

Binomial name
- Leptosiphon aureus (Nutt.) J.M.Porter & L.A.Johnson

Synonyms
- Linanthus aureus Linanthus chrysanthus

= Leptosiphon aureus =

Species of flowering plant

Leptosiphon aureus (a.k.a. Leptosiphon chrysanthus) is a species of flowering plant in the phlox family known by the common name golden linanthus.

== Description ==
Golden linanthus is an annual herb producing a thin, threadlike stem with occasional leaves divided into narrow needlelike lobes. The oppositely arranged leaves are each divided into very narrow bristlelike lobes up to a centimeter long.

The tip of the stem has an inflorescence of usually a single flower with corolla lobes under a centimeter long. The nominate subspecies generally has bright to golden yellow flowers, while ssp. decorus has white or cream blooms. The bloom period is March to June.

=== Subspecies ===
The two subspecies overlap in geography but do not occur together.

- Leptosiphon aureus ssp. aureus (Leptosiphon chrysanthus ssp. chrysanthus) — pinyon-juniper woodlands, madrean pine-oak woodlands in Madrean Sky Islands, and desert flats.
- Leptosiphon aureus subsp. decorus (Leptosiphon chrysanthus ssp. decorus) — endemic to the Mojave Desert in California.

== Distribution and habitat ==
The plant is native to the Southwestern United States in Arizona, Nevada, New Mexico, and Southern California; and to northwestern Mexico in Baja California state.

It grows in desert flats and desert chaparral of the Mojave Desert and Sonoran Desert; in chaparral and woodlands of the Peninsular Ranges and Transverse Ranges; and in pinyon-juniper woodlands and madrean pine-oak woodlands of Madrean Sky Islands.
