= Linanthus bellus =

Conservation status
- Imperiled (NatureServe)

Scientific classification
- Kingdom: Plantae
- Clade: Tracheophytes
- Clade: Angiosperms
- Clade: Eudicots
- Clade: Asterids
- Order: Ericales
- Family: Polemoniaceae
- Genus: Linanthus
- Species: L. bellus

Binomial name
- Linanthus bellus (A.Gray) Greene

Species of flowering plant

Linanthus bellus is an uncommon species of flowering plant in the phlox family known by the common name desertbeauty. It is known only from northern Baja California and eastern San Diego County, California, where it grows in high desert chaparral in sandy soils. This is a petite annual herb producing short, threadlike stems lined with occasional tiny needle-lobed leaves. The inflorescence is usually a single tiny flower with bright pink lobes no more than a centimeter across. The flower has a yellow throat with purple spots.
