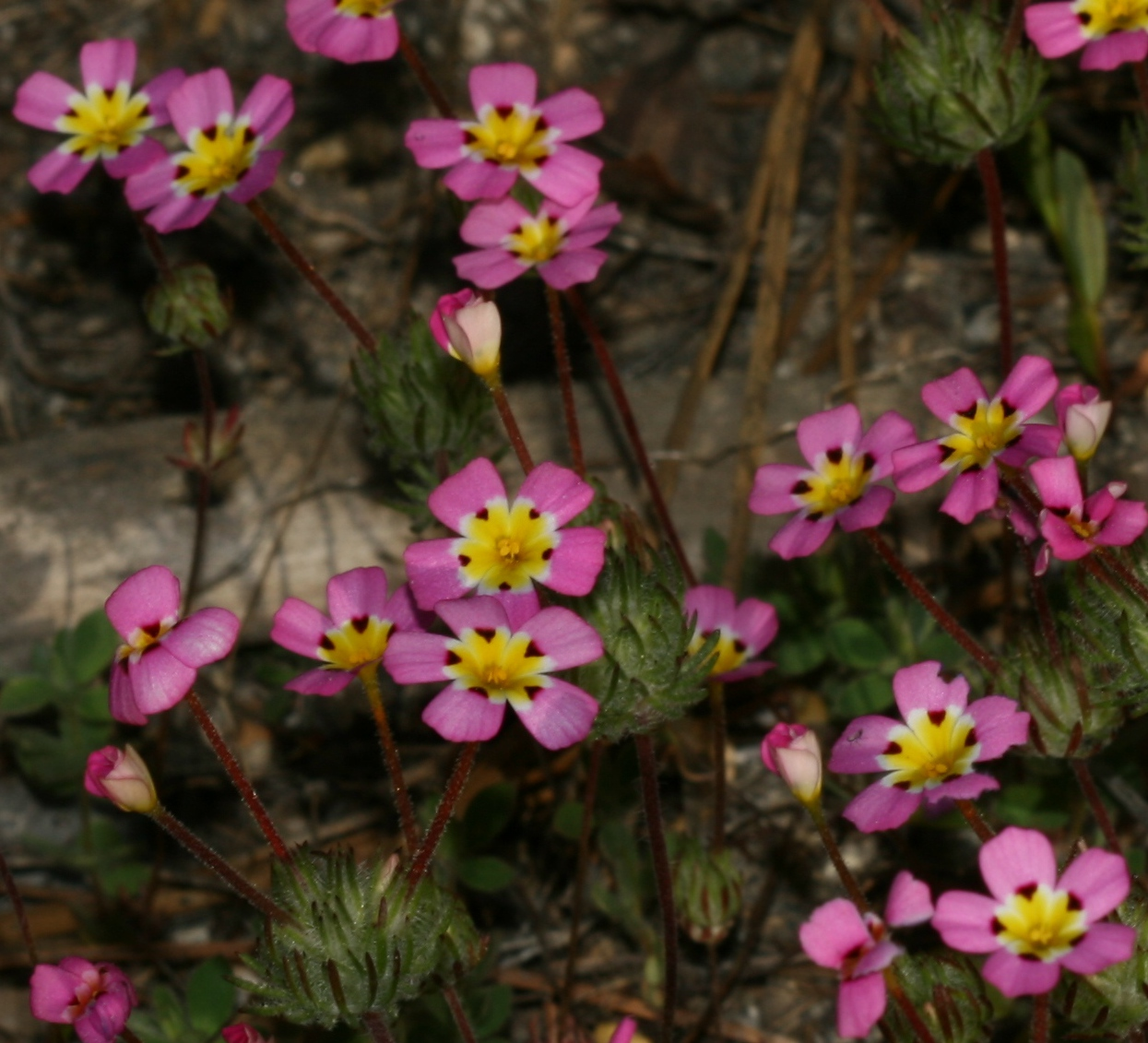

Scientific classification
- Kingdom: Plantae
- Clade: Tracheophytes
- Clade: Angiosperms
- Clade: Eudicots
- Clade: Asterids
- Order: Ericales
- Family: Polemoniaceae
- Genus: Leptosiphon
- Species: L. montanus

Binomial name
- Leptosiphon montanus (Greene) J.M.Porter & L.A.Johnson

Synonyms
- Linanthus montanus

= Leptosiphon montanus =

Species of flowering plant

Leptosiphon montanus (synonym Linanthus montanus) is a species of flowering plant in the phlox family, known by the common name "mustang clover".

== Distribution ==
It is endemic to California and grows in dry openings within oak woodland habitats in the western Sierra Nevada foothills, at elevations between 300–1,700 metres (980–5,580 ft).

== Description ==
Leptosiphon montanus is an annual herb with a thin, hairy stem growing up to 60 centimeters tall. Its leaves are divided into needle-like, linear lobes, each measuring 2 to 3 centimeters in length.

The inflorescence is a head composed of small but showy flowers. Each flower features a long, hairy, dark red tube up to 3 centimeters long that spreads into a flat corolla. The corolla lobes are white or range from light to deep pink, marked with reddish spots at the yellow and white throat. The plant blooms from April to July.

== See also ==
- Flora of the Sierra Nevada (United States)
