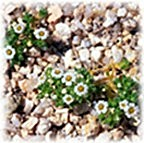

Conservation status
- Imperiled (NatureServe)

Scientific classification
- Kingdom: Plantae
- Clade: Tracheophytes
- Clade: Angiosperms
- Clade: Eudicots
- Clade: Asterids
- Order: Ericales
- Family: Polemoniaceae
- Genus: Maculigilia; V.E.Grant (1998 publ. 1999)
- Species: M. maculatus

Binomial name
- Maculigilia maculatus (Parish) V.E.Grant (1998 publ. 1999)

Synonyms
- Gilia maculata Parish (1892); Linanthus maculatus Milliken (1904); Linanthus maculatus subsp. emaculatus J.M.Porter, D.S.Bell & R.Patt. (2014 publ. 2015)

= Maculigilia =

Species of flowering plant

Maculigilia maculatus (synonyms Linanthus maculatus and Gilia maculata) is a species of flowering plant in the phlox family. It is known by the common names San Bernardino Mountain gilia and Little San Bernardino Mountains gilia. It is the sole species in genus Maculigilia. It is endemic to California, where it is known only from a few locales in the Little San Bernardino Mountains and the adjacent Palm Springs area in the northern end of the Coachella Valley. The largest populations, which may contain thousands of individuals, are located within the bounds of Joshua Tree National Park.

This is a very small annual herb no more than three centimeters high. It has a taproot which may exceed 6 centimeters in length to collect moisture from the dry desert sand in its native habitat. The tiny, hairy stem branches to form small matted clusters on the sand surface. The hairy leaves are just a few millimeters long and unlobed. The inflorescence is a dense cluster of flowers each only 2 to 5 millimeters wide. The flower corolla has curled-back lobes which are white, sometimes with a spot of purple or pink. The protruding stamens are yellow. The main threat to this species is development in its range, and it is also vulnerable to off-road vehicle damage in the wide open sandy flats where it grows.
