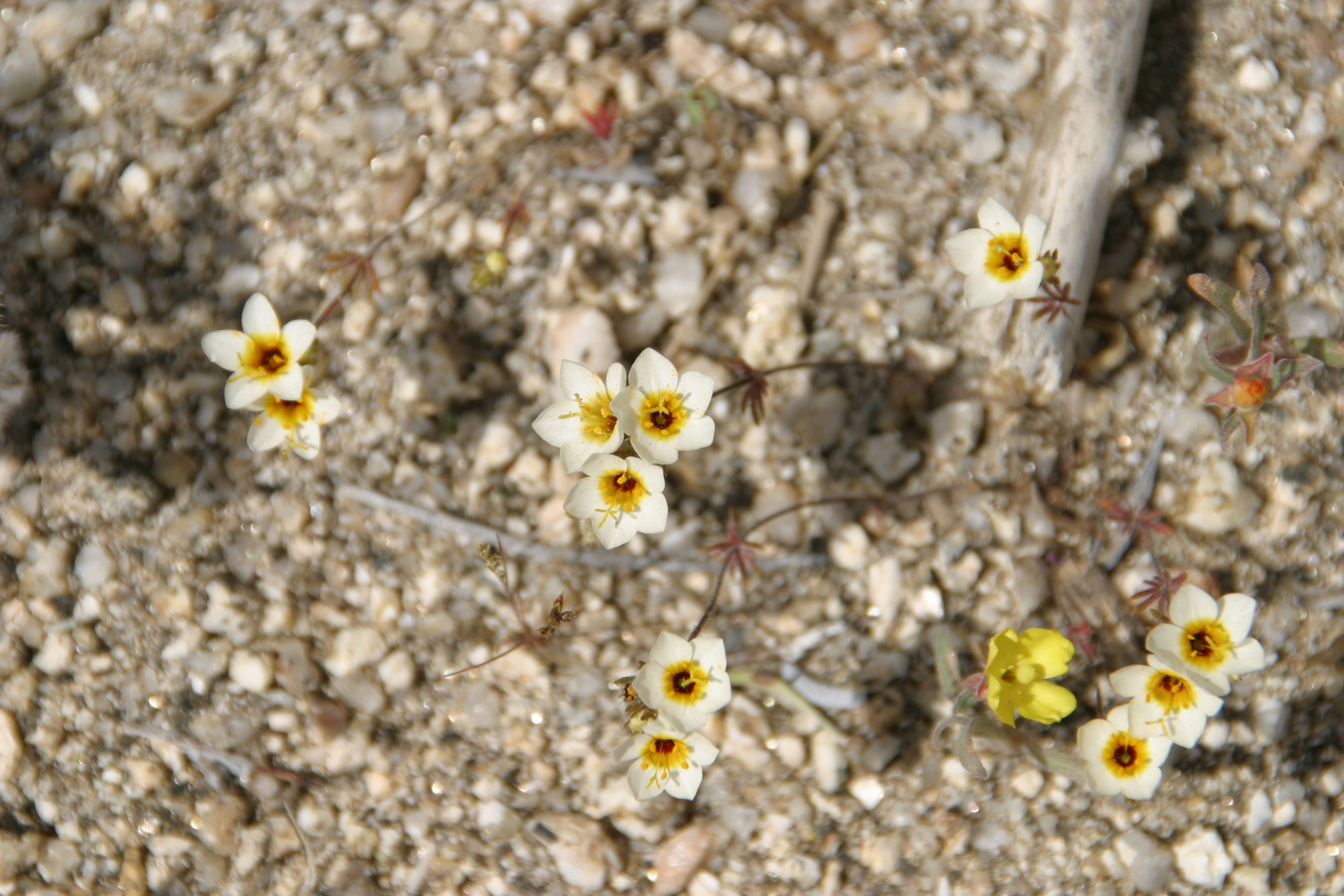

Scientific classification
- Kingdom: Plantae
- Clade: Tracheophytes
- Clade: Angiosperms
- Clade: Eudicots
- Clade: Asterids
- Order: Ericales
- Family: Polemoniaceae
- Genus: Leptosiphon
- Species: L. lemmonii

Binomial name
- Leptosiphon lemmonii (A.Gray) J.M.Porter & L.A.Johnson

Synonyms
- Linanthus lemmonii

= Leptosiphon lemmonii =

Species of flowering plant

Leptosiphon lemmonii (syn. Linanthus lemmonii) is a species of flowering plant in the phlox family known by the common name Lemmon's linanthus.

Leptosiphon lemmonii is native to the San Bernardino Mountains and the Peninsular Ranges in southern California (U.S.) and northern Baja California (México). It grows below 1,900 metres (6,200 ft), in dry inland chaparral, oak woodlands, the Colorado Desert chaparral ecotone, and Yellow pine forest habitats.

== Description ==
Leptosiphon lemmonii is a small, hairy, glandular annual herb producing a thin stem no more than about 15 centimeters tall. The leaves are divided into needle-like linear lobes, each a few millimeters in length.

The inflorescence is an array of a few small flowers accompanied by bracts shaped much like the leaves. Each flower has lobes only 2 or 3 millimeters long, usually white or cream in color darkening to yellow and orange in the throat, sometimes with maroon areas as well. The bloom period is April to June.
