= Leptosiphon serrulatus =

Conservation status
- Critically Imperiled (NatureServe)

Scientific classification
- Kingdom: Plantae
- Clade: Embryophytes
- Clade: Tracheophytes
- Clade: Spermatophytes
- Clade: Angiosperms
- Clade: Eudicots
- Clade: Asterids
- Order: Ericales
- Family: Polemoniaceae
- Genus: Leptosiphon
- Species: L. serrulatus

Binomial name
- Leptosiphon serrulatus (Greene) J.M.Porter & L.A.Johnson

Synonyms
- Linanthus serrulatus

Species of flowering plant

Leptosiphon serrulatus (syn. Linanthus serrulatus) is a rare species of flowering plant in the phlox family known by the common name Madera linanthus. It is endemic to California, where it is known from the chaparral and woodlands in the Sierra Nevada foothills, from Madera to Kern Counties.

== Description ==
Leptosiphon serrulatus is a plant of woodlands, chaparral, and yellow pine forests. It is a small annual herb producing a thin, hairy stem up to about 18 centimeters tall. The leaves are divided into linear lobes up to a centimeter in length. The inflorescence is a head of small flowers, each with a purplish tube almost a centimeter long and a white corolla.
