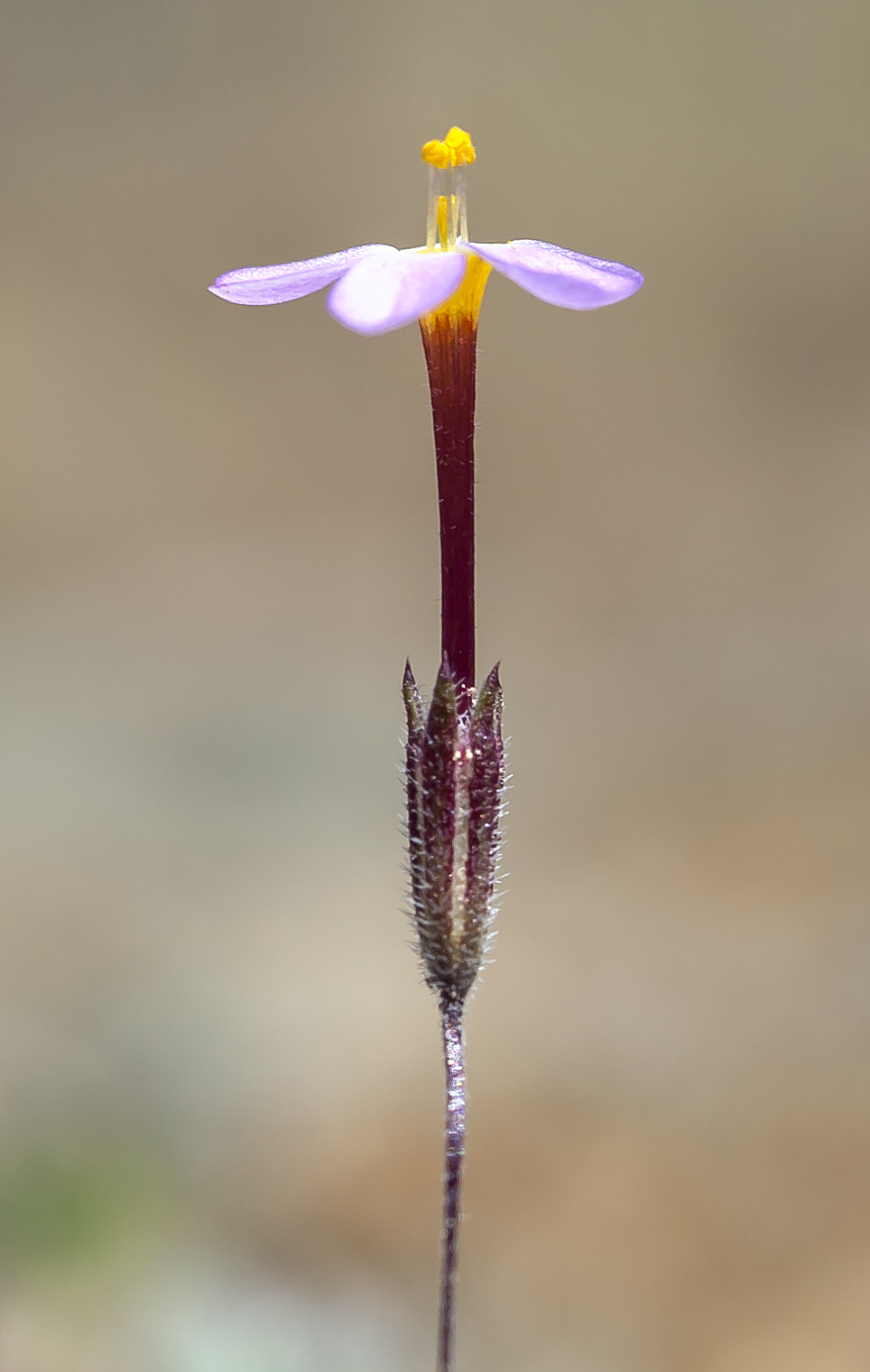

Scientific classification
- Kingdom: Plantae
- Clade: Tracheophytes
- Clade: Angiosperms
- Clade: Eudicots
- Clade: Asterids
- Order: Ericales
- Family: Polemoniaceae
- Genus: Leptosiphon
- Species: L. rattanii

Binomial name
- Leptosiphon rattanii (A.Gray) J.M.Porter & L.A.Johnson

Synonyms
- Linanthus rattanii

= Leptosiphon rattanii =

Species of flowering plant

Leptosiphon rattanii (syn. Linanthus rattanii) is a rare species of flowering plant in the phlox family known by the common name Rattan's linanthus.

It is endemic to California, where it is known only from inner sections of the North Coast Ranges.

It is a small, thin annual herb producing a hairy, glandular stem up to 20 centimeters tall. The leaves are divided into tiny threadlike lobes. The inflorescence is generally made up of a single flower with a very thin, hairy, reddish tube over a centimeter long tipped with a flat white corolla with lobes a few millimeters in length.
