= Leptosiphon nudatus =

Scientific classification
- Kingdom: Plantae
- Clade: Tracheophytes
- Clade: Angiosperms
- Clade: Eudicots
- Clade: Asterids
- Order: Ericales
- Family: Polemoniaceae
- Genus: Leptosiphon
- Species: L. nudatus

Binomial name
- Leptosiphon nudatus (Greene) J.M.Porter & L.A.Johnson

Synonyms
- Linanthus nudatus

Species of flowering plant

Leptosiphon nudatus (syn. Linanthus nudatus) is a species of flowering plant in the phlox family known by the common name Tehachapi linanthus.

== Distribution ==
It is endemic to California, where it is known only from the Tehachapi Mountains and the southern peaks of the Sierra Nevada. It grows in chaparral, woodlands, and other local mountain habitat.

== Description ==
This is an annual herb producing a thin, hairy stem up to 30 centimeters tall. The hairy, glandular leaves are partially divided into needle-like linear lobes. The inflorescence is a head of a few flowers with hairy white tubes up to a centimeter long and white or pink corollas about a centimeter wide.
