= Leptosiphon oblanceolatus =

Scientific classification
- Kingdom: Plantae
- Clade: Tracheophytes
- Clade: Angiosperms
- Clade: Eudicots
- Clade: Asterids
- Order: Ericales
- Family: Polemoniaceae
- Genus: Leptosiphon
- Species: L. oblanceolatus

Binomial name
- Leptosiphon oblanceolatus (Brand) J.M.Porter & L.A.Johnson

Synonyms
- Linanthus oblanceolatus

Species of flowering plant

Leptosiphon oblanceolatus (syn. Linanthus oblanceolatus) is a species of flowering plant in the phlox family known by the common name Sierra Nevada linanthus.

== Distribution ==
It is endemic to California, where it is known only from a section of the southern Sierra Nevada. It grows in open meadows of temperate coniferous forest habitats, from 2,800–3,700 metres (9,200–12,100 ft) in elevation.

== Description ==
Leptosiphon oblanceolatus is a small, hairy annual herb producing a thin stem no more than about 12 centimeters tall. The leaves are each divided into widely lance-shaped lobes up to 1.5 centimeters long.

The inflorescence is a head of small flowers. Each has a narrow white tube about a centimeter long and a yellow-throated white corolla just a few millimeters wide. The bloom period is from July to August.
