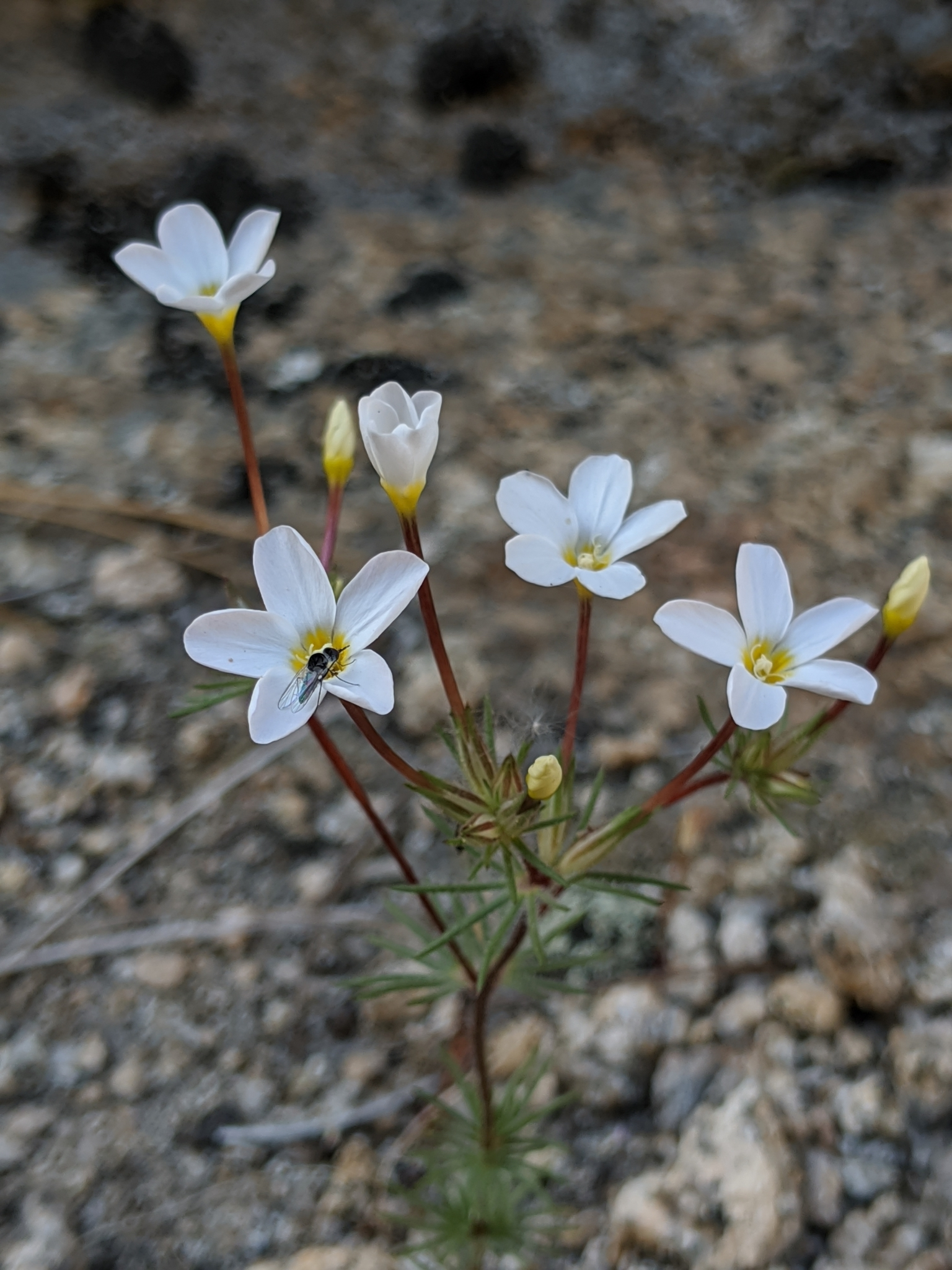

Scientific classification
- Kingdom: Plantae
- Clade: Tracheophytes
- Clade: Angiosperms
- Clade: Eudicots
- Clade: Asterids
- Order: Ericales
- Family: Polemoniaceae
- Genus: Leptosiphon
- Species: L. breviculus

Binomial name
- Leptosiphon breviculus (A.Gray) J.M.Porter & L.A.Johnson

Synonyms
- List: Gilia brevicula A.Gray; Gilia royalis Brand; Linanthus androsaceus var. breviculus Milliken; Linanthus breviculus Greene; Linanthus breviculus subsp. royalis (Brand) H.Mason; Navarretia brevicula (A.Gray) Kuntze

= Leptosiphon breviculus =

Species of flowering plant

Leptosiphon breviculus is a species of flowering plant in the phlox family known by the common name Mojave linanthus. It is endemic to California, where it is known from the Mojave Desert and dry spots in the adjacent Transverse Ranges.

It is an annual herb producing a thin, hairy stem up to about 25 centimeters tall. The hairy, oppositely arranged leaves are each divided into very narrow needle-like lobes up to a centimeter long. The tip of the stem is occupied by an inflorescence of one or more white, pink, or blue flowers with purple throats, each about a centimeter wide.

The length of the stem is around 10 cm to 25 cm. The characteristics of the leaf are lobes 3mm to 10 mm, linear to lance-linear. Ecology is deserts and dry montane areas. The flowering time of the Leptosiphon breviculus is May—Aug.
