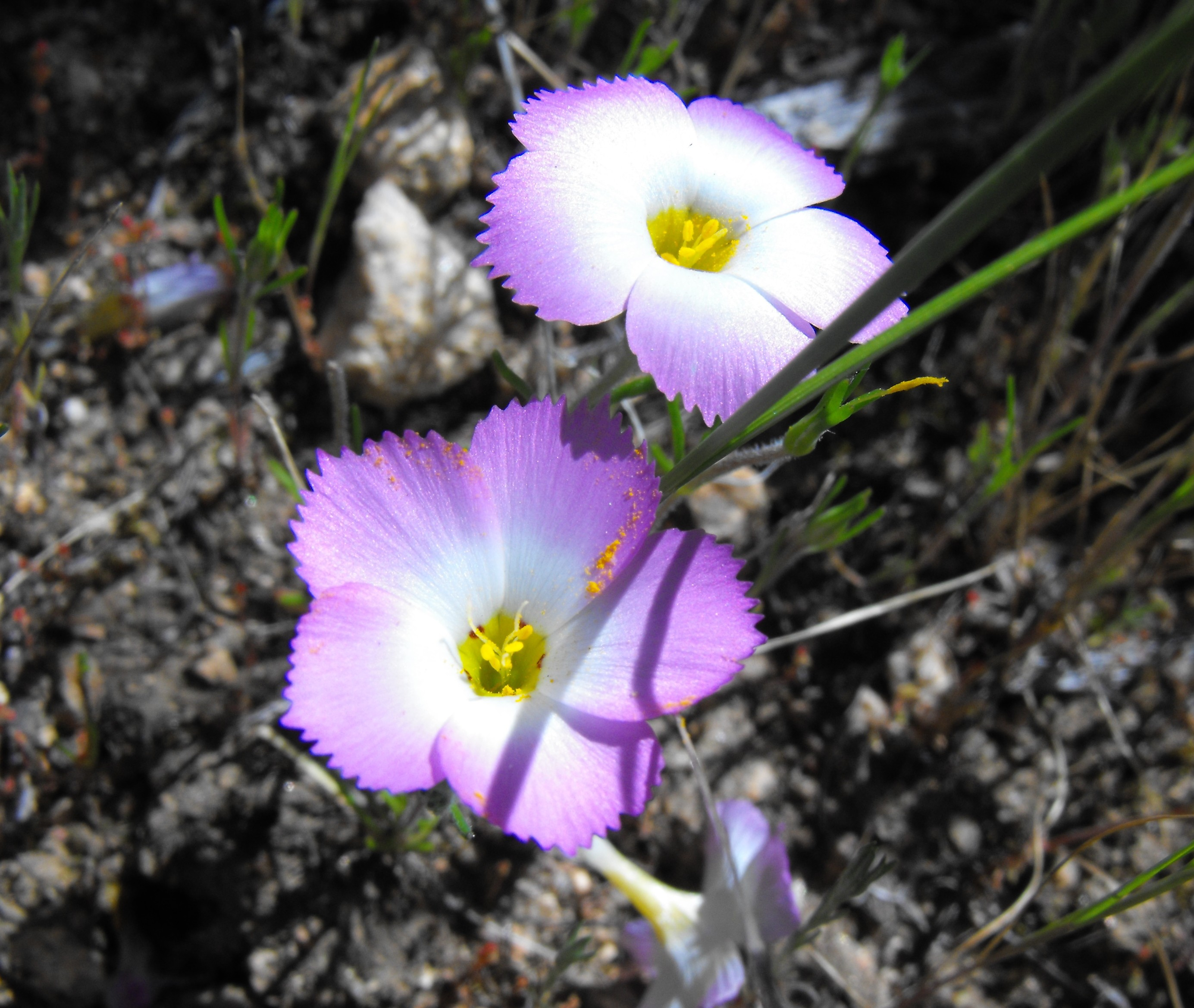

Scientific classification
- Kingdom: Plantae
- Clade: Embryophytes
- Clade: Tracheophytes
- Clade: Spermatophytes
- Clade: Angiosperms
- Clade: Eudicots
- Clade: Asterids
- Order: Ericales
- Family: Polemoniaceae
- Genus: Linanthus
- Species: L. dianthiflorus

Binomial name
- Linanthus dianthiflorus (Benth.) Greene

= Linanthus dianthiflorus =

Species of flowering plant

Linanthus dianthiflorus is a species of flowering plant in the phlox family known by the common names fringed linanthus and ground pink.

The annual wildflower is endemic to southern California and northern Baja California, in the Peninsular Ranges, Transverse Ranges, and on the Channel Islands. It can be found in many types of local open habitat, such as chaparral.

== Distribution ==
Linanthus dianthiflorus is an annual herb producing a very thin, hairy stem no more than about 12 centimeters long. The leaves are linear to threadlike and unlobed, reaching up to 2 centimeters long.

The inflorescence bears several leaves and one or more flowers with hairy leaflike sepals. Each flower has pale pink lobes with fringed or toothed tips and purple spots at the bases. The throat of the flower has yellow and white coloration.

== See also ==
- California chaparral and woodlands
