= Leptosiphon ambiguus =

Scientific classification
- Kingdom: Plantae
- Clade: Tracheophytes
- Clade: Angiosperms
- Clade: Eudicots
- Clade: Asterids
- Order: Ericales
- Family: Polemoniaceae
- Genus: Leptosiphon
- Species: L. ambiguus

Binomial name
- Leptosiphon ambiguus (Rattan) J.M.Porter & L.A.Johnson

Synonyms
- Linanthus ambiguus (Rattan) Greene

Species of flowering plant

Leptosiphon ambiguus (syn. Linanthus ambiguus), the serpentine linanthus, is a low annual plant with narrowly lanceolate leaves and a vivid lavender flower. It grows generally in serpentine soils and is an endemic threatened species of the Bay Area in California.
