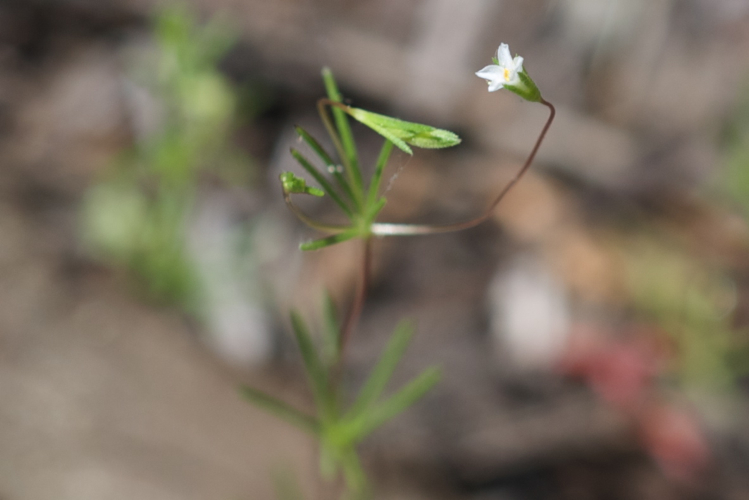

Scientific classification
- Kingdom: Plantae
- Clade: Tracheophytes
- Clade: Angiosperms
- Clade: Eudicots
- Clade: Asterids
- Order: Ericales
- Family: Polemoniaceae
- Genus: Leptosiphon
- Species: L. harknessii

Binomial name
- Leptosiphon harknessii (Curran) J.M.Porter & L.A.Johnson

Synonyms
- Gilia harknessii Curran; Linanthus harknessii (Curran) Greene

= Leptosiphon harknessii =

Species of flowering plant

Leptosiphon harknessii (syn. Linanthus harknessii) is a species of flowering plant in the phlox family known by the common name Harkness' flaxflower.

== Distribution and habitat ==
The plant is native to western North America, from British Columbia south through California, and eastward to Utah and Idaho. It grows in open areas of several coniferous forest habitats, from 1,000–3,200 metres (3,300–10,500 ft) in elevation.

== Description ==
Leptosiphon harknessii is a petite annual herb threadlike stem no more than about 15 centimeters long. The widely spaced leaves are each divided into very narrow linear lobes up to 1.5 centimeters long.

The inflorescence at the tip of each branch of the stem is a single tiny flower, white or faintly blue in color, which is rolled up into a tube most of the time. The bloom period is June to August.
