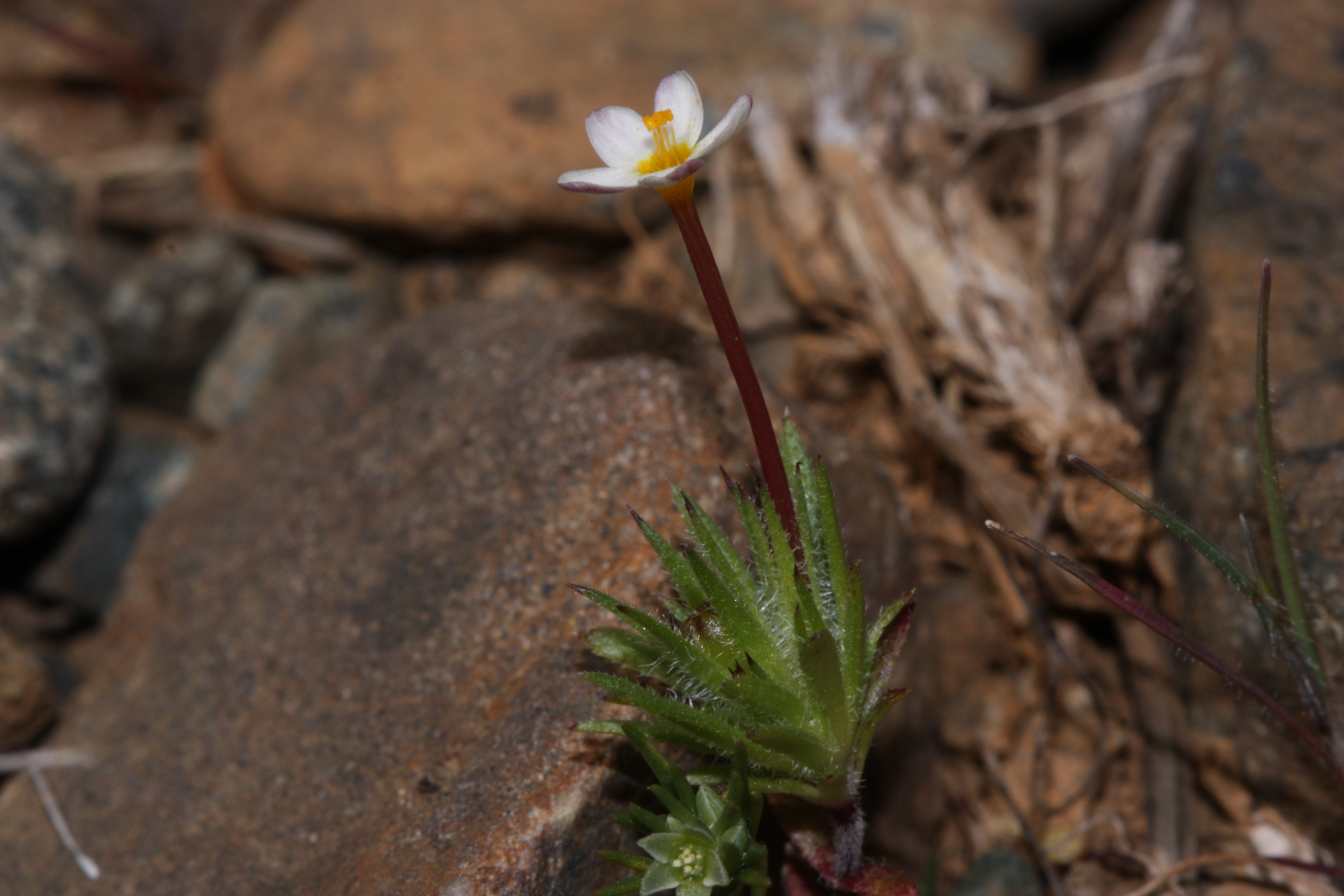

Scientific classification
- Kingdom: Plantae
- Clade: Tracheophytes
- Clade: Angiosperms
- Clade: Eudicots
- Clade: Asterids
- Order: Ericales
- Family: Polemoniaceae
- Genus: Leptosiphon
- Species: L. bicolor

Binomial name
- Leptosiphon bicolor Nutt.

Synonyms
- Linanthus bicolor (Nutt.) Greene

= Leptosiphon bicolor =

Species of flowering plant

Leptosiphon bicolor (syn. Linanthus bicolor), known as true babystars, is a low annual flowering plant related to Phlox with clumps of needle-like leaves. Populations often contain both white-flowered and pink-flowered plants. It is native to the west coast of North America from northern Baja California to southern British Columbia.
