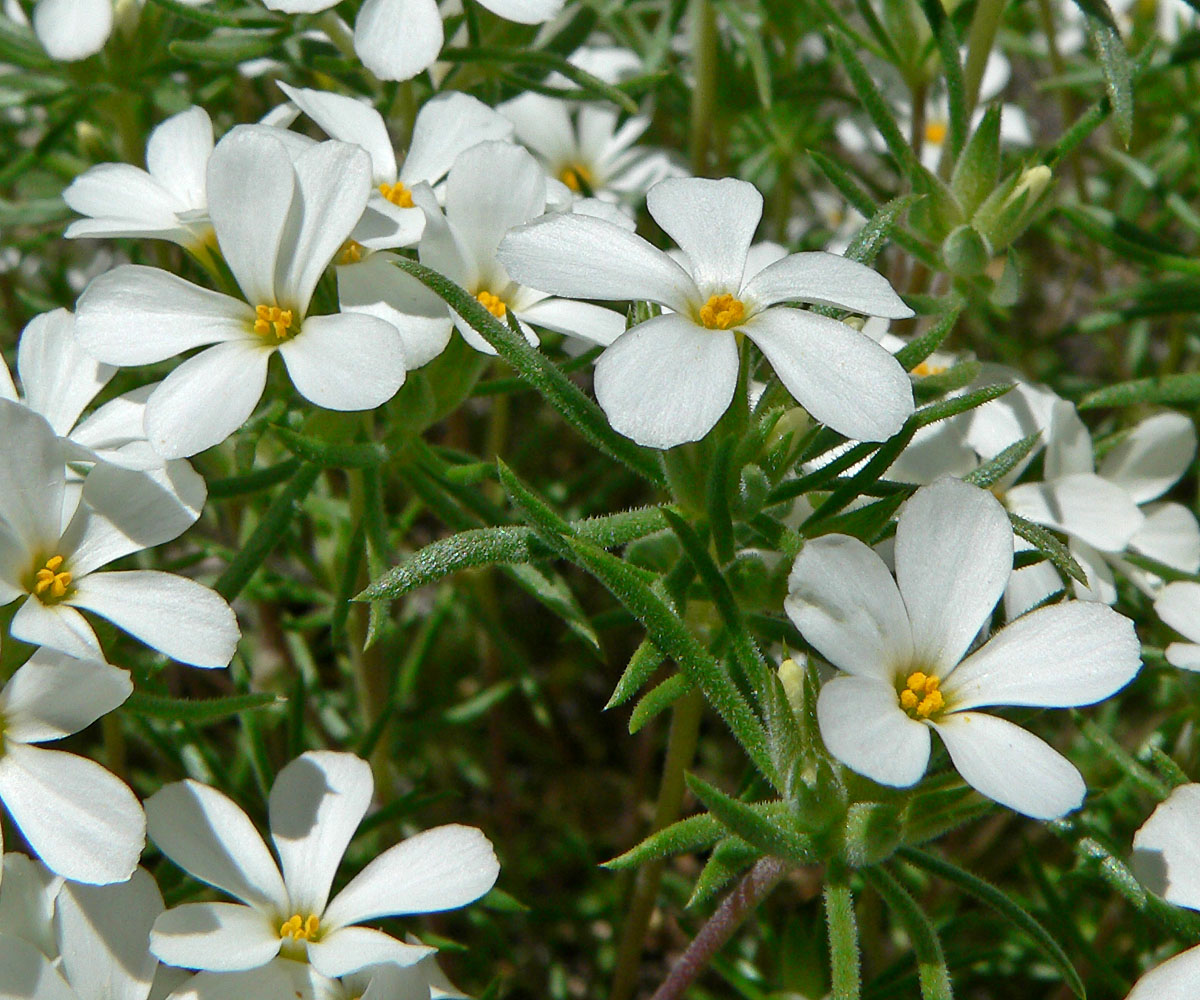
- subsp. pubescens

Conservation status
- Secure (NatureServe)

Scientific classification
- Kingdom: Plantae
- Clade: Embryophytes
- Clade: Tracheophytes
- Clade: Spermatophytes
- Clade: Angiosperms
- Clade: Eudicots
- Clade: Asterids
- Order: Ericales
- Family: Polemoniaceae
- Genus: Leptosiphon
- Species: L. nuttallii

Binomial name
- Leptosiphon nuttallii (A.Gray) J.M.Porter & L.A.Johnson

Synonyms
- Gilia nuttallii; Leptodactylon nuttallii; Linanthastrum nuttallii; Linanthus nuttallii; Navarretia nuttallii; Siphonella nuttallii

= Leptosiphon nuttallii =

Plant species in the phlox family

Leptosiphon nuttallii is a species of flowering plant in the phlox family known by the common name Nuttall's linanthus.

It is native to much of western North America, including the Western United States from California to New Mexico and Montana, and Northwestern Mexico. It is known from many types of habitat.

It is native to the Klamath Mountains, Northern California Coast Ranges and Sierra Nevada in Northern California; and the Inyo Mountains, Peninsular Ranges, Transverse Ranges, and White Mountains in Southern California.

== Description ==
Leptosiphon nuttallii is a perennial herb producing a patch of small, hairy stems up to about 20 centimeters tall. Each leaf is divided into usually five very narrow, needlelike lobes.

The inflorescence is a cluster of flowers, each with white corolla lobes about half a centimeter long each joined at a yellowish throat.

== Taxonomy ==
Leptosiphon nuttallii was scientifically described in 1870 by Asa Gray as a species of Gilia named Gilia nuttallii. It was moved several times by various botanists before being placed in the Leptosiphon genus in 2000 by James Mark Porter and Leigh Alma Johnson. Along with the rest of its genus it is classified in the Polemoniaceae family.

=== Subspecies ===
According to Plants of the World Online three subspecies are accepted:

- Leptosiphon nuttallii subsp. howellii, Mt. Tedoc linanthus — a rare subspecies known from just a few populations deep within the Yolla Bolly-Middle Eel Wilderness in the Klamath Mountains, Northern California. It is California Department of Fish and Wildlife and IUCN listed Endangered species, and is on the California Native Plant Society Inventory of Rare and Endangered Plants.
- Leptosiphon nuttallii subsp. nuttallii – The most widespread, from Baja California to Montana.
- Leptosiphon nuttallii subsp. pubescens – endemic to the Eastern Sierra Nevada and Great Basin region in California and Nevada.

Leptosiphon nuttallii has 18 synonyms of the species or its three subspecies, including six species names.

Table of Synonyms
Name	Year	Rank	Synonym of:	Notes
Gilia nuttallii A.Gray	1870	species	L. nuttallii	≡ hom.
Gilia nuttallii var. arida Brand	1921	variety	subsp. nuttallii	= het.
Gilia nuttallii var. floribunda Munz	1935	variety	subsp. nuttallii	= het.
Gilia nuttallii subvar. floribunda Brand	1907	subvariety	subsp. nuttallii	= het.
Gilia nuttallii var. montana Brand	1907	variety	subsp. nuttallii	= het.
Gilia nuttallii var. parviflora Brand	1907	variety	subsp. nuttallii	= het.
Leptodactylon nuttallii Rydb.	1906	species	subsp. nuttallii	= het.
Leptosiphon nuttallii var. howellii (T.W.Nelson & R.Patt.) Tiehm	2023	variety	subsp. howellii	≡ hom.
Leptosiphon nuttallii var. pubescens (R.Patt.) Tiehm	2023	variety	subsp. pubescens	≡ hom.
Linanthastrum nuttallii (A.Gray) Ewan	1942	species	L. nuttallii	≡ hom.
Linanthastrum nuttallii subsp. pubescens (R.Patt.) D.W.Taylor	2010	subspecies	subsp. pubescens	≡ hom.
Linanthastrum nuttallii var. pubescens (R.Patt.) Cronquist	1984	variety	subsp. pubescens	≡ hom.
Linanthus nuttallii (A.Gray) Greene ex Milliken	1904	species	L. nuttallii	≡ hom.
Linanthus nuttallii subsp. howellii T.W.Nelson & R.Patt.	1985	subspecies	subsp. howellii	≡ hom.
Linanthus nuttallii subsp. pubescens R.Patt.	1977	subspecies	subsp. pubescens	≡ hom.
Linanthus nuttallii subsp. tenuilobus R.Patt.	1977	subspecies	subsp. nuttallii	= het.
Navarretia nuttallii (A.Gray) Kuntze	1891	species	L. nuttallii	≡ hom.
Siphonella nuttallii (A.Gray) A.Heller	1912	species	L. nuttallii	≡ hom.
Notes: ≡ homotypic synonym; = heterotypic synonym

== Names ==
The species name, nuttallii, is the Latinized surname of the naturalist Thomas Nuttall. Leptosiphon nuttallii is known by the common names buslty desert-gold, bushy leptosiphon, and Nuttall's linanthus.

== Range ==
Leptosiphon nuttallii is native to northwestern Mexico and the western United States. In Mexico it grows in Baja California Sur in the Sierra de la Laguna mountains at the southern end of the Baja Peninsula. It also is known from the state of Sonora. In the United States it is widespread, growing in all the southwestern states as far east as New Mexico and the northwestern US as far north Washington and Montana.
