= Jessie Milliken =

American botanist (1874–1951)

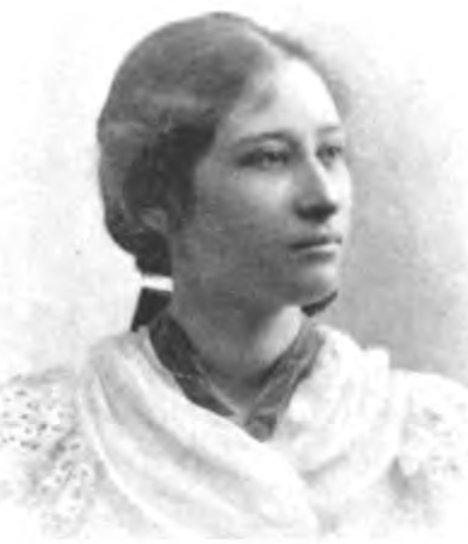
- Milliken, from the 1897 yearbook of Cornell University
- Born: July 25, 1874; San Francisco, California, U.S.
- Died: August 1, 1951 (aged 77); Carson City, Nevada, U.S.
- Occupation: Botanist

Jessie Milliken Brown (July 25, 1874 –August 1, 1951) was a botanist noted for identifying several species in the Polemoniaceae family.

== Biography ==
Milliken was born in San Francisco, the daughter of Isaac Temple Milliken and Ellen Adelia Evans Milliken. Her father was born in Maine, and her mother was born in New York. She graduated from Cornell University in 1897 and pursued further studies at the University of California, Berkeley.

Milliken married the experimental psychologist Warner Brown who was an emeritus professor of psychology at University of California, Berkeley and retired in 1952. They had a daughter, Ellen, and a son, Frederick who died in 1926, at age 16. Ellen went on to become an associate professor of medicine at the University of California medical center in San Francisco.

Jessie served on the first board of directors of the College Women's Club of Berkeley, when it was organized in 1920.

She was on vacation in the Lake Tahoe area when she died in 1951, at the age of 77, in Carson City, Nevada.

The standard author abbreviation Milliken is used to indicate this person as the author when citing a botanical name.

== Selected works ==
- "Variation in the foliage on the annual shoots of the apetalous and gamopetalous trees and shrubs" (1897)
- A review of Californian Polemoniaceae (1904)
