= California oak woodland =

Plant community found in the western United States and Mexico

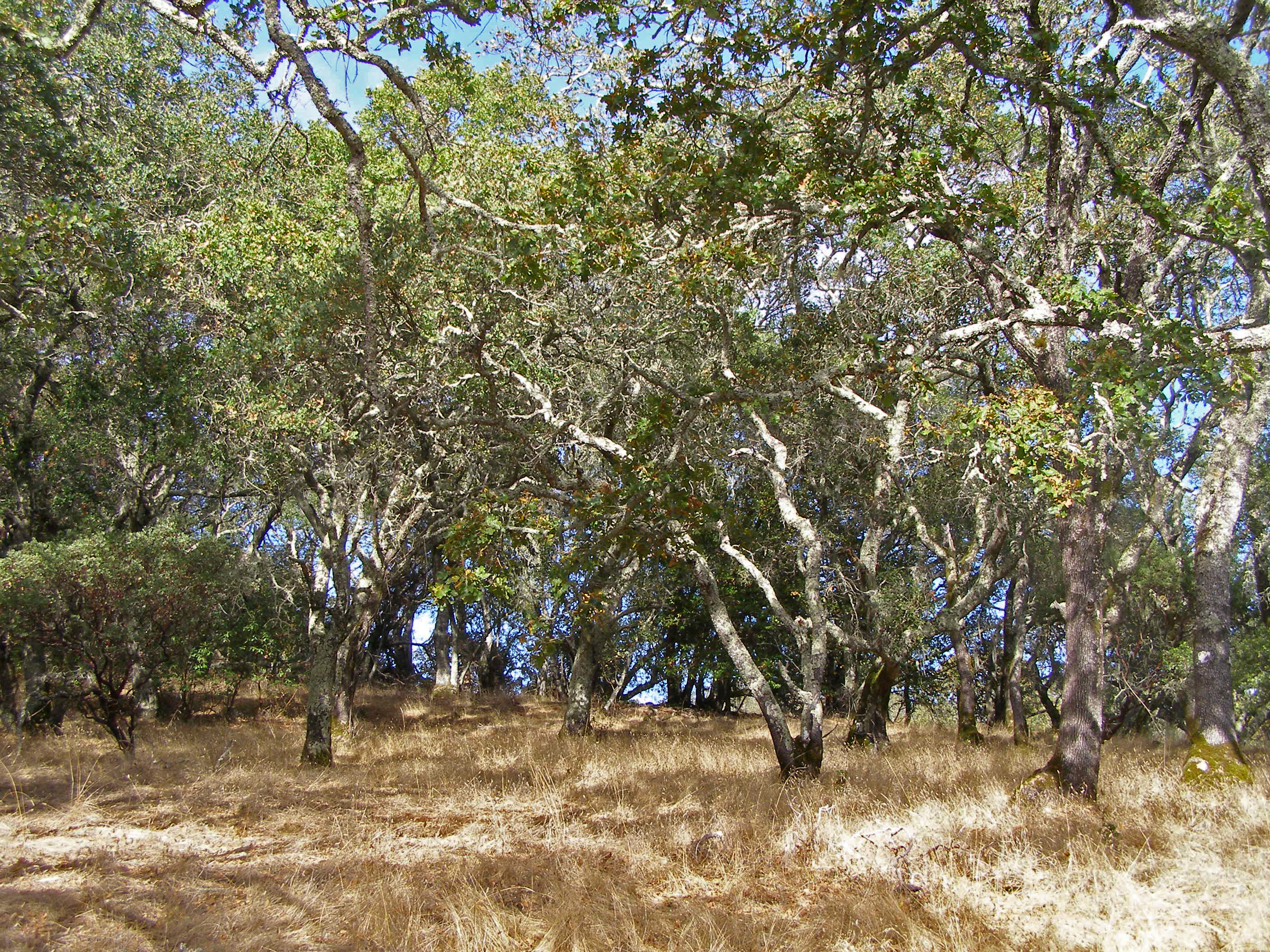
California oak woodland on the east flank of Sonoma Mountain.

California oak woodland is a plant community found throughout the California chaparral and woodlands ecoregion of California in the United States and northwestern Baja California in Mexico. Oak woodland is widespread at lower elevations in coastal California; in interior valleys of the Coast Ranges, Transverse Ranges and Peninsular Ranges; and in a ring around the California Central Valley grasslands. The dominant trees are oaks, interspersed with other broadleaf and coniferous trees, with an understory of grasses, herbs, geophytes, and California native plants.

Oak savannas occur where the oaks are more widely spaced due a combination of lack of available moisture, and low-intensity frequent fires.

The oak woodlands of Southern California and coastal Northern California are dominated by coast live oak (Quercus agrifolia), but also include valley oak (Q. lobata), California black oak (Q. kelloggii), canyon live oak (Q. chrysolepis), and other California oaks. The foothill oak woodlands around the Central Valley are dominated by blue oak (Q. douglasii) and gray pine (Pinus sabiniana).

== California oak-woodland communities ==
- Oregon oak woodland is found in Northern California's Klamath-Siskiyou, Northern Coast Ranges, and southern Cascade Range. These woodlands are composed primarily of Oregon oak (Q. garryana), interior live oak (Q. wislizeni), and coast live oak, together with California black oak, canyon live oak, blue oak, Pacific madrone (Arbutus menziesii), California bay (Umbellularia californica), incense cedar (Calocedrus decurrens), coast Douglas fir (Pseudotsuga menziesii var. menziesii), Coulter Pine and ponderosa Pine (Pinus ponderosa).
- Blue oak woodland is found in the inner coast ranges and the Sierra Nevada foothills, surrounding the Central Valley. It forms "one of the largest ecosystems in California". Primary species are blue oak (Q. douglasii) and interior live oak (or on west facing slopes facing the exterior ranges, particularly in Contra Costa and Alameda counties, coast live oak takes interior live oak's place), together with valley oak, canyon live oak, California scrub oak (Q. berberidifolia), gray pine, California buckeye (Aesculus californica), and western redbud (Cercis occidentalis).
- Coast live oak woodland is widespread in northern and southern California, and is dominated by coast live oak (Q. agrifolia), together with California buckeye, Pacific madrone, California bay, and California walnut (Juglans californica).
- Interior live oak woodland is found in north and south mountain ranges of California. It is dominant by interior live oaks (Q. wislizeni), blue oaks, foothill pine, and shrubs in common with blue oak woodland.
- Valley oak woodland is found in the interior valleys of northern, central and southern California, and is dominated by valley oak (Q. lobata) and coast live oak, together with gray pine and Coulter pine (Pinus coulteri).
- Island oak woodland is found on the California Channel Islands, and is made up primarily of island oak (Q. tomentella) and coast live oak, together with canyon live oak, MacDonald scrub oak (Q. berberidifolia) hybridized with valley or other oaks), Catalina ironwood (Lyonothamnus floribundus), and bishop pine (Pinus muricata).
- Engelmann oak woodland is found in a few locations in the northern Peninsular Ranges of Southern California, including the Santa Rosa Plateau and San Gabriel Mountains foothills. It consists mostly of Engelmann oak (Q. engelmannii) together with coast live oak.

== Examples of occurrence ==
The headwaters area of Yulupa Creek in Annadel State Park is cited as one of the best examples of California oak woodlands. Much of this woodland has considerable biodiversity. An unusual characteristic of this Annadel forest is the high presence of endemic bunchgrasses, likely related to the common presence of endemic soils like serpentine and a lack of cultivation.

The Morro Bay watershed, located in Central California, is an example of a coast live oak ecosystem. This sub-category of California oak woodland consists primarily of coast wild oak and are predominantly found in coastal regions, but can extend to foothill ecosystems.

== Ecology of California oak woodlands ==
The composition and characteristics of California oak woodlands varies across the state, but are defined by three main oak species throughout coastal regions: coastal live oak, Englemann oak, and Oregon white oak. The concentration of each of these oak species correlates with the location of the woodland throughout California.

In the Sierra Nevada range, oak woodland is found on western slopes at elevations of 500 to 3,000 feet (150 to 910 m) in the northern part of the range, 800 to 4,000 feet (240 to 1,220 m) in the central part, and 1,250 to 5,000 feet (380 to 1,520 m) in the southern part. Annual precipitation in the oak woodland range is 15 to 40 inches (0.38 to 1.02 m), with little precipitation in the summer. Growing season is 6–10 months. Temperatures range 75 to 96 °F (24 to 36 °C) in the summer, and 29 to 42 °F (−2 to 6 °C) in winter. The woodlands in the Sierra are characterized by a dominant overstory of Foothill Pine (Pinus sabiniana), Blue Oak (Quercus douglasii), Interior Live Oak (Quercus chrysolepis), California Black Oak (Quercus kelloggii), California Buckeye (Aesculus californica), and understory plants including Ceanothus spp., Toyon (Heteromeles arbutifolia), Dogwood (Cornus spp.), and Redbud (Cercis occidentalis). It is often found on north facing slopes there is more moisture in the soils from protection from the sun (slope effect).

In southern and central areas, the predominant oak species is coastal live oak which grow on coastal valleys and foothills. In drier regions within this range, coastal wild oak is associated with foothill pine, valley oak and blue oak; whereas wetter areas are defined by tanoak, canyon live oak and California bay. Coastal live oak woodland found in Southern California is associated with valley oak similar to drier northern sites, but also sees interior live oak, Coulter pine and California black walnut.

Outside of the southern ranges of coastal wild oak are small areas of oak woodland characterized by Englemann oak. These sites can coincide with coastal live oak, however they can also occur as stands composed almost entirely of Englemann oak.

Northern, wetter regions of California are populated with oak woodlands formed from Oregon white oak. These woodlands are associated interior live oak and canyon live oak similar to coastal live oak woodlands, but differ with Pacific madrone and California black oak.

The variety of canopy density which results from the diversity of tree species found in different woodland regions causes a wide range of understory grass and shrub density, and plant type. An example of this can be seen by the commonality of annual grasses in open woodlands, a phenomenon that is not seen in dense woodland areas.

All three oak species which characterize California oak woodlands can be defined as "long-lived, slow-growing trees."

The frequent fires seen within the region have resulted in species such as coastal live oak and Englemann oak (which grow in drier, more fire prone regions) to have developed a resistance to low-intensity fires. This resiliency has resulted in coastal live oak emerging as the predominant species in cleared regions, as the trees have higher fitness to survive compared to less resistant, deciduous oaks. The same cannot be said for Oregon white oak, which populate traditionally wetter, less fire-prone regions, resulting in the trees having little built-up fire resistance. Because of the lack of fires in these northern regions, white oaks can have the threat of being outgrown by conifers growing in the understory.

California oak woodland habitats contain some of the most wildlife in California. More than half of the species of terrestrial vertebrates in California are found in oak woodlands. This includes more than 120 species of mammals, 147 species of birds, and 60 species of amphibians or reptiles. The most diversity occurs when there is both multiple levels of vegetation heights and varied spacing between vegetation to create complex habitat structure both vertically and horizontally because there are more places for species that live in different layers of the vegetation.

Among these species, the California quail (Callipepla californicus), Beechey ground squirrels (Spermophilus beecheyi), Botta pocket gopher (Thomomys bottae mewa), Audubon cottontail (Sylvilagus audubonii vallicola), deer (Odocoileus spp), bobcat (Lynx rufus californicus), coyote (Canis latrans) and the Pacific rattlesnake (Crotalus viridis oreganus) can commonly be found in California oak woodlands.

Aspects of the California oak woodland that are important for wildlife of these habitats are habitat corridors, snags and downed wood. Natural vegetation create habitat corridors that connect the patches of habitat that host species. Habitat corridors provide protection and food for animals that migrate between patches such as deer, mountain lions, bobcats, or gray foxes.

Snags are the standing wood that is left when trees die and are home to wood-eating insects that are food for animals such as birds. Snags provide temporary refuge for small birds, bats, swallows, salamanders, and lizards. Similarly, downed wood provide refuge for animals that require moist areas, such as amphibians, cover for nesting of multiple species of birds, and areas for dens for larger snags.

== Status and future of California oak woodlands ==
Blue oak woodlands cover about 2,939,000 acres (11,890 km^{2}; 4,592 mi^{2}) of the state, and of this area about 79%, or 2,322,000 acres (9,400 km^{2}; 3,628 mi^{2}), shows no evidence of past cutting of trees. Recent research by the University of Arkansas Tree-Ring Laboratory has studied several unlogged stands of blue oak woodlands, and suggests that the state may harbor over 500,000 acres (2,000 km^{2}; 780 mi^{2}) of such old growth forests. This would make California's oak woodlands some of the most extensive old growth forests left in the state. Reproduction the oaks varies by region and local conditions, with the Northern half of the state often having significantly more reproduction than the southern half. Locally, pulses in the deer herd and rodent populations, livestock management, drought, and fire can all affect successful seedling survival.

The Oaks 2040 survey estimates that 750,000 acres (3,000 km^{2}; 1,170 mi^{2}) of California oak woodlands are seriously threatened by 2040 as a burgeoning state population makes ever more use of the wildland. This comprehensive survey includes oak woodland maps and inventory data for the ten oak types found in California. By evaluating this new information against current State of California economic growth projections, the location and extent of oak woodlands most at risk of development are identified.

Management practices, such as grazing (or the lack thereof) can lower soil fertility and nutrient level. A study performed by the University of California, Davis found that the prominent presence of oak trees in California oak woodlands creates areas of soil that are optimal for new growth.

The Bureau of Land Management partnered with the California Biodiversity Council to carry out the Agreement on Biological Diversity, started in 1991, to protect and expand the following oakland wood areas: King Range National Conservation Area, Cache Creek Management Area, Yuba River Watershed in Inimim Forest, Consumes River Preserve, and Fort Ord. The methods used to ensure a healthy future for the California oak woodlands include maintenance and restoration of old-growth forests, watershed management and improvement, protection of water quality, protection of wildlife species that have cultural and environmental value to the area, restoration of valley oaks, and the habitat maintenance of "special status botanical species" and select endangered species.

Due to residential and commercial development, 64% of California counties reported a decrease of greater than 5% in oak woodland area.

== See also ==
- California chaparral and woodlands – Ecoregion in the western United States and Mexico
- Oak savanna – Lightly forested grassland where oak trees are dominant
- Cedar hemlock douglas-fir forest – Forest type
- California native plants
- Blue Oak Ranch Reserve – Part of the University of California Natural Reserve System
- Sierra Nevada lower montane forest – Biotic zone in California
- Dehesa, a type of managed oak ecosystem in Spain

== General bibliography ==
- Dallman, Peter R. (1998). Plant Life in the World's Mediterranean Climates. California Native Plant Society–University of California Press; Berkeley.
- Gaman, Tom and Firman, Jeffrey (2006). Oaks 2040: The Status and Future of Oaks in California. Published by the California Oak Foundation, Oakland.
- Pavlik, Bruce M., Pamela C. Muick, Sharon G. Johnson, and Marjorie Popper (1991). Oaks of California. Cachuma Press and the California Oak Foundation; Los Olivos, California.
- Schoenherr, Allan A. (1992). A Natural History of California. University of California Press; Berkeley.
