= List of Canadian plants by genus L =

This is a partial list of the plant species considered native to Canada.

Many of the plants seen in Canada were introduced, either intentionally or accidentally. For these plants, see List of introduced species to Canada.

N indicated native and X indicated exotic. Those plants whose status is unknown are marked with a ?.

Due to Canada's biodiversity, this page is divided.

== La ==
- Lachnanthes — Carolina redroot
  - Lachnanthes caroliana — Carolina redroot
- Lactuca — lettuces
  - Lactuca biennis — tall blue lettuce
  - Lactuca canadensis — Canada lettuce
  - Lactuca floridana — woodland lettuce
  - Lactuca hirsuta — hairy lettuce
  - Lactuca ludoviciana — western lettuce
  - Lactuca muralis — wall lettuce
  - Lactuca tatarica — Tartarian lettuce
  - Lactuca terrae-novae — Newfoundland lettuce
- Lagotis
  - Lagotis minor — little weaselsnout
- Laportea — wood-nettle
  - Laportea canadensis — Canada wood-nettle
- Lappula — stickseeds
  - Lappula occidentalis — flatspine sheepburr
- Larix — larches
  - Larix laricina — tamarack, American larch
  - Larix lyallii — alpine larch
  - Larix occidentalis — western larch
- Lasthenia — goldfields
  - Lasthenia maritima — maritime goldfields
- Lathyrus — peavines
  - Lathyrus bijugatus – Latah tule-pea
  - Lathyrus japonicus – beach pea
  - Lathyrus littoralis – grey beach peavine
  - Lathyrus nevadensis – Sierra Nevada peavine
  - Lathyrus ochroleucus – pale vetchling peavine
  - Lathyrus palustris – vetchling peavine
  - Lathyrus venosus – smooth veiny peavine

== Le ==
- Lechea — pinweeds
  - Lechea intermedia — narrowleaf pinweed
  - Lechea maritima — beach pinweed
  - Lechea mucronata — hairy pinweed
  - Lechea pulchella — Leggett's pinweed
  - Lechea stricta — upright pinweed
  - Lechea tenuifolia — slender pinweed
- Ledum — Labrador-teas
  - Ledum glandulosum — glandular Labrador-tea
  - Ledum groenlandicum — common Labrador-tea
  - Ledum palustre — marsh Labrador-tea
  - Ledum x columbianum — Columbian Labrador-tea
- Leersia — cutgrass
  - Leersia oryzoides — rice cutgrass
  - Leersia virginica — Virginia cutgrass
- Lejeunea — liverworts
  - Lejeunea alaskana
  - Lejeunea cavifolia
- Lemna — duckweeds
  - Lemna minor — lesser duckweed
  - Lemna trisulca — star duckweed
  - Lemna turionifera — turion duckweed
- Lepidium — pepper-grasses
  - Lepidium densiflorum — denseflower pepper-grass
  - Lepidium oxycarpum — sharp-pod pepper-grass
  - Lepidium ramosissimum — branched pepper-grass
  - Lepidium virginicum — poor-man's pepper-grass
- Lepidozia — liverworts
  - Lepidozia filamentosa
  - Lepidozia reptans
  - Lepidozia sandvicensis
- Leptarrhena — saxifrage
  - Leptarrhena pyrolifolia — leatherleaf saxifrage
- Leptobryum — mosses
  - Leptobryum pyriforme
- Leptodactylon — prickly-phlox
  - Leptodactylon pungens — granite prickly-phlox
- Leptodictyum — mosses
  - Leptodictyum humile
  - Leptodictyum riparium — Kneiff's feathermoss
- Lescuraea — mosses
  - Lescuraea saxicola
- Leskea — mosses
  - Leskea gracilescens
  - Leskea obscura
  - Leskea polycarpa
- Leskeella — mosses
  - Leskeella nervosa
- Lespedeza — bushclovers
  - Lespedeza capitata – roundhead bushclover
  - Lespedeza hirta – hairy bushclover
  - Lespedeza intermedia – wand bushclover
  - Lespedeza procumbens – trailing bushclover
  - Lespedeza violacea – violet bushclover
  - Lespedeza virginica – slender bushclover
  - Lespedeza x longifolia
  - Lespedeza x nuttallii – Nuttall's bushclover
- Lesquerella — bladderpods
  - Lesquerella alpina — alpine bladderpod
  - Lesquerella arctica — arctic bladderpod
  - Lesquerella arenosa — Great Plains bladderpod
  - Lesquerella calderi — Calder's bladderpod
  - Lesquerella douglasii — Douglas' bladderpod
  - Lesquerella ludoviciana — silver bladderpod
- Leucanthemum — daisies
  - Leucanthemum integrifolium — entire-leaf daisy
  - Leucanthemum vulgare — oxeye daisy
- Leucobryum — mosses
  - Leucobryum glaucum — pincushion moss
- Leucodon — mosses
  - Leucodon brachypus
  - Leucodon julaceus
- Leucolepis — mosses
  - Leucolepis acanthoneuron
- Leucophysalis — ground-cherry
  - Leucophysalis grandiflora — large-flowered ground-cherry
- Leucospora — conobea
  - Leucospora multifida — cliff conobea
- Lewisia — bitterroots
  - Lewisia columbiana — Columbian bitterroot
  - Lewisia pygmaea — alpine bitterroot
  - Lewisia rediviva — Oregon bitterroot
  - Lewisia triphylla — three-leaf bitterroot
- Leymus — lyme grass
  - Leymus cinereus — Great Basin lyme grass
  - Leymus innovatus — northwestern wildrye
  - Leymus mollis — sea lyme grass
  - Leymus triticoides — beardless lyme grass
  - Leymus x vancouverensis — Vancouver Island lyme grass

== Li ==
- Liastris — grayfeathers, blazingstars
  - Liatris aspera — tall gayfeather
  - Liatris cylindracea — slender blazingstar
  - Liatris ligulistylis — strapstyle gayfeather
  - Liatris punctata — dotted gayfeather
  - Liatris spheroidea — spherical gayfeather
  - Liatris spicata — marsh blazingstar
  - Liatris × creditonensis
  - Liatris × gladewitzii
- Ligusticum — lovages
  - Ligusticum calderi — Calder's lovage
  - Ligusticum canbyi — Canby's wild lovage
  - Ligusticum scoticum — Scotch lovage
  - Ligusticum verticillatum — Idaho lovage
- Lilaeopsis — lilæopsis
  - Lilaeopsis chinensis — eastern lilæopsis
  - Lilaeopsis occidentalis — western lilæopsis
- Lilium — lilies
  - Lilium canadense — Canada lily
  - Lilium columbianum — Columbian lily
  - Lilium michiganense — Michigan lily
  - Lilium philadelphicum — wood lily
- Limnanthes — meadowfoams
  - Limnanthes macounii — Macoun's meadowfoam
- Limonium — sea-lavenders
  - Limonium carolinianum — sea-lavender
- Limosella — mudworts
  - Limosella aquatica — northern mudwort
  - Limosella australis — mudwort
- Limprichtia — mosses
  - Limprichtia cossonii
  - Limprichtia revolvens — limprichtia moss
- Linanthus — desert-gold
  - Linanthus bicolor — bicoloured desert-gold
  - Linanthus harknessii — harkness linanthus
  - Linanthus septentrionalis — northern desert-gold
- Lindbergia — mosses
  - Lindbergia brachyptera — Lindberg's maple-moss
- Lindera — spicebush
  - Lindera benzoin — spicebush
- Lindernia
  - Lindernia dubia — yellowseed false pimpernel
- Linnaea — twinflower
  - Linnaea borealis — twinflower
- Linum — flaxes
  - Linum australe — southern flax
  - Linum compactum — Wyoming flax
  - Linum lewisii — prairie flax
  - Linum medium — stiff yellow flax
  - Linum rigidum — stiff-stem flax
  - Linum striatum — ridged yellow flax
  - Linum sulcatum — grooved yellow flax
  - Linum virginianum — Virginia flax
- Liparis — widelip orchids
  - Liparis liliifolia — large twayblade
  - Liparis loeselii — Lösel's twayblade
- Lipocarpha — halfchaff sedges, bulrushes
  - Lipocarpha micrantha — dwarf bulrush
- Liriodendron — tulip trees
  - Liriodendron tulipifera — tulip tree
- Lithophragma — woodland-stars
  - Lithophragma glabrum — bulbous woodland-star
  - Lithophragma parviflorum — smallflower woodland-star
  - Lithophragma tenellum — slender woodland-star
- Lithospermum — puccoons, gromwells, stoneseeds
  - Lithospermum canescens — hoary puccoon
  - Lithospermum caroliniense — golden puccoon
  - Lithospermum incisum — narrow-leaved puccoon
  - Lithospermum latifolium — American gromwell
  - Lithospermum ruderale — western gromwell
- Littorella — shoregrass
  - Littorella uniflora — American shoregrass

== Lo ==
- Lobelia — lobelias
  - Lobelia cardinalis — cardinal-flower
  - Lobelia dortmanna — water lobelia
  - Lobelia inflata — Indian-tobacco
  - Lobelia kalmii — Kalm's lobelia
  - Lobelia siphilitica — great blue lobelia
  - Lobelia spicata — palespike lobelia
  - Lobelia x speciosa
- Loeskeobryum
  - Loeskeobryum brevirostre
- Loeskypnum — mosses
  - Loeskypnum badium
  - Loeskypnum wickesiae
- Loiseleuria — kalmias
  - Loiseleuria procumbens — alpine-azalea
- Lomatium — desert-parsleys
  - Lomatium ambiguum — streambank desert-parsley
  - Lomatium brandegeei — Brandegee's desert-parsley
  - Lomatium cous — cousroot desert-parsley
  - Lomatium dissectum — fernleaf desert-parsley
  - Lomatium foeniculaceum — carrotleaf desert-parsley
  - Lomatium geyeri — Geyer's desert-parsley
  - Lomatium grayi — mountain desert-parsley
  - Lomatium macrocarpum — largefruit desert-parsley
  - Lomatium martindalei — coast range lomatium
  - Lomatium nudicaule — nakedstem desert-parsley
  - Lomatium orientale — Oriental desert-parsley
  - Lomatium sandbergii — Sandberg's desert-parsley
  - Lomatium simplex — umbrella desert-parsley
  - Lomatium triternatum — ternate desert-parsley
  - Lomatium utriculatum — foothill desert-parsley
- Lomatogonium — felwort
  - Lomatogonium rotatum — marsh felwort
- Lonicera — honeysuckles
  - Lonicera caerulea — western honeysuckle
  - Lonicera canadensis — American fly-honeysuckle
  - Lonicera ciliosa — orange honeysuckle
  - Lonicera dioica — mountain honeysuckle
  - Lonicera hirsuta — hairy honeysuckle
  - Lonicera hispidula — California honeysuckle
  - Lonicera involucrata — four-line honeysuckle
  - Lonicera oblongifolia — swamp fly-honeysuckle
  - Lonicera reticulata — grape honeysuckle
  - Lonicera utahensis — Utah honeysuckle
  - Lonicera villosa — mountain fly-honeysuckle
- Lophiola — golden crest
  - Lophiola aurea — golden crest
- Lophocolea — liverworts
  - Lophocolea bidentata
  - Lophocolea heterophylla — variable-leaved crestwort
  - Lophocolea minor
- Lophozia — liverworts
  - Lophozia alpestris
  - Lophozia ascendens
  - Lophozia badensis
  - Lophozia bantriensis
  - Lophozia bicrenata
  - Lophozia capitata
  - Lophozia collaris
  - Lophozia excisa
  - Lophozia gillmanii
  - Lophozia grandiretis
  - Lophozia groenlandica
  - Lophozia guttulata
  - Lophozia heterocolpos
  - Lophozia hyperarctica
  - Lophozia incisa
  - Lophozia latifolia
  - Lophozia laxa
  - Lophozia longidens
  - Lophozia obtusa
  - Lophozia opacifolia
  - Lophozia pellucida
  - Lophozia rutheana
  - Lophozia sudetica
  - Lophozia ventricosa
  - Lophozia wenzelii
- Lorinseria — chainferns
  - Lorinseria areolata — netted chainfern
- Lotus — trefoils
  - Lotus denticulatus – meadow trefoil
  - Lotus formosissimus – seaside trefoil
  - Lotus micranthus – smallflower trefoil
  - Lotus parviflorus – smallflower trefoil
  - Lotus pinnatus – bog bird's-foot trefoil
  - Lotus unifoliolatus – American bird's-foot trefoil

== Lu ==
- Ludwigia — water-purslanes, seedboxes
  - Ludwigia alternifolia — bushy seedbox
  - Ludwigia palustris — marsh seedbox
  - Ludwigia polycarpa — many-fruit false-loosestrife
- Luetkea — luetkea, partridgefoot
  - Luetkea pectinata — segmented lütkea, partridgefoot
- Luina — silverbacks
  - Luina hypoleuca — littleleaf silverback
- Lupinus — lupines
  - Lupinus albicaulis – sickle-keel lupine
  - Lupinus arbustus – longspur lupine
  - Lupinus arcticus – Arctic lupine
  - Lupinus argenteus – silvery lupine
  - Lupinus bicolor – Lindley's lupine
  - Lupinus bingenensis – Bingen lupine
  - Lupinus burkei – Burke's lupine
  - Lupinus caespitosus – stemless dwarf lupine
  - Lupinus caudatus – Kellogg's spurred lupine
  - Lupinus densiflorus – dense-flowered lupine
  - Lupinus formosus – summer lupine
  - Lupinus kuschei – Yukon lupine
  - Lupinus latifolius – broadleaf lupine
  - Lupinus lepidus – prairie lupine
  - Lupinus leucophyllus – woolly-leaf lupine
  - Lupinus littoralis – seashore lupine
  - Lupinus lyallii – Lyall's lupine
  - Lupinus minimus – Kettle Falls lupine
  - Lupinus nootkatensis – Nootka lupine
  - Lupinus oreganus – Oregon lupine
  - Lupinus parviflorus – lodgepole lupine
  - Lupinus perennis – sundial lupine
  - Lupinus polycarpus – smallflower lupine
  - Lupinus polyphyllus – largeleaf lupine
  - Lupinus prunophilus – hairy bigleaf lupine
  - Lupinus pusillus – small lupine
  - Lupinus rivularis – riverbank lupine
  - Lupinus sericeus – Pursh's silky lupine
  - Lupinus sulphureus – sulphur-flower lupine
  - Lupinus vallicola – open lupine
  - Lupinus wyethii – Wyeth's lupine
  - Lupinus x alpestris
- Luzula — woodrushes
  - Luzula acuminata — hairy woodrush
  - Luzula alpinopilosa — alpine woodrush
  - Luzula nivalis — arctic woodrush
  - Luzula arcuata — curved woodrush
  - Luzula campestris — common woodrush
  - Luzula comosa — Pacific woodrush
  - Luzula confusa — northern woodrush
  - Luzula echinata — hedgehog woodrush
  - Luzula glabrata — smooth woodrush
  - Luzula groenlandica — Greenland woodrush
  - Luzula multiflora — common woodrush
  - Luzula parviflora — smallflower woodrush
  - Luzula piperi — Piper's woodrush
  - Luzula rufescens — hairy woodrush
  - Luzula spicata — spiked woodrush
  - Luzula wahlenbergii — Wahlenberg's woodrush

== Ly ==
- Lychnis — silene, campion
  - Lychnis alpina — alpine campion
- Lycopodiella — clubmosses
  - Lycopodiella appressa — southern bog clubmoss
  - Lycopodiella inundata — bog clubmoss
- dium — ground-pines
  - Lycopodiella appressa — southern bog clubmoss
  - Lycopodiella inundata — bog clubmoss
  - Lycopodium annotinum — stiff clubmoss
  - Lycopodium clavatum — running-pine
  - Lycopodium dendroideum — treelike clubmoss
  - Lycopodium hickeyi — Hickey's clubmoss
  - Lycopodium lagopus — one-cone ground-pine
  - Lycopodium obscurum — tree clubmoss
- Lycopus — bugleweeds, water horehounds
  - Lycopus americanus — American bugleweed
  - Lycopus asper — rough bugleweed
  - Lycopus laurentianus — St. Lawrence water-horehound
  - Lycopus rubellus — taperleaf bugleweed
  - Lycopus uniflorus — northern bugleweed
  - Lycopus virginicus — Virginia bugleweed
  - Lycopus x sherardii
- Lygodesmia — skeletonplants
  - Lygodesmia juncea — rush skeletonplant
- Lysichiton — skunk-cabbage
  - Lysichiton americanus — yellow skunk-cabbage
- Lysimachia — loosestrifes
  - Lysimachia ciliata — fringed loosestrife
  - Lysimachia hybrida — lanceleaf loosestrife
  - Lysimachia lanceolata — lanceleaf loosestrife
  - Lysimachia quadriflora — four-flower loosestrife
  - Lysimachia quadrifolia — whorled yellow loosestrife
  - Lysimachia terrestris — swamp loosestrife
  - Lysimachia thyrsiflora — water loosestrife
  - Lysimachia × commixta — mixed loosestrife
  - Lysimachia × producta — elongated loosestrife
- Lythrum — loosestrifes
  - Lythrum alatum — winged loosestrife
