= Anagyrine =

Chemical compound

- Skeletal structure of anagyrine

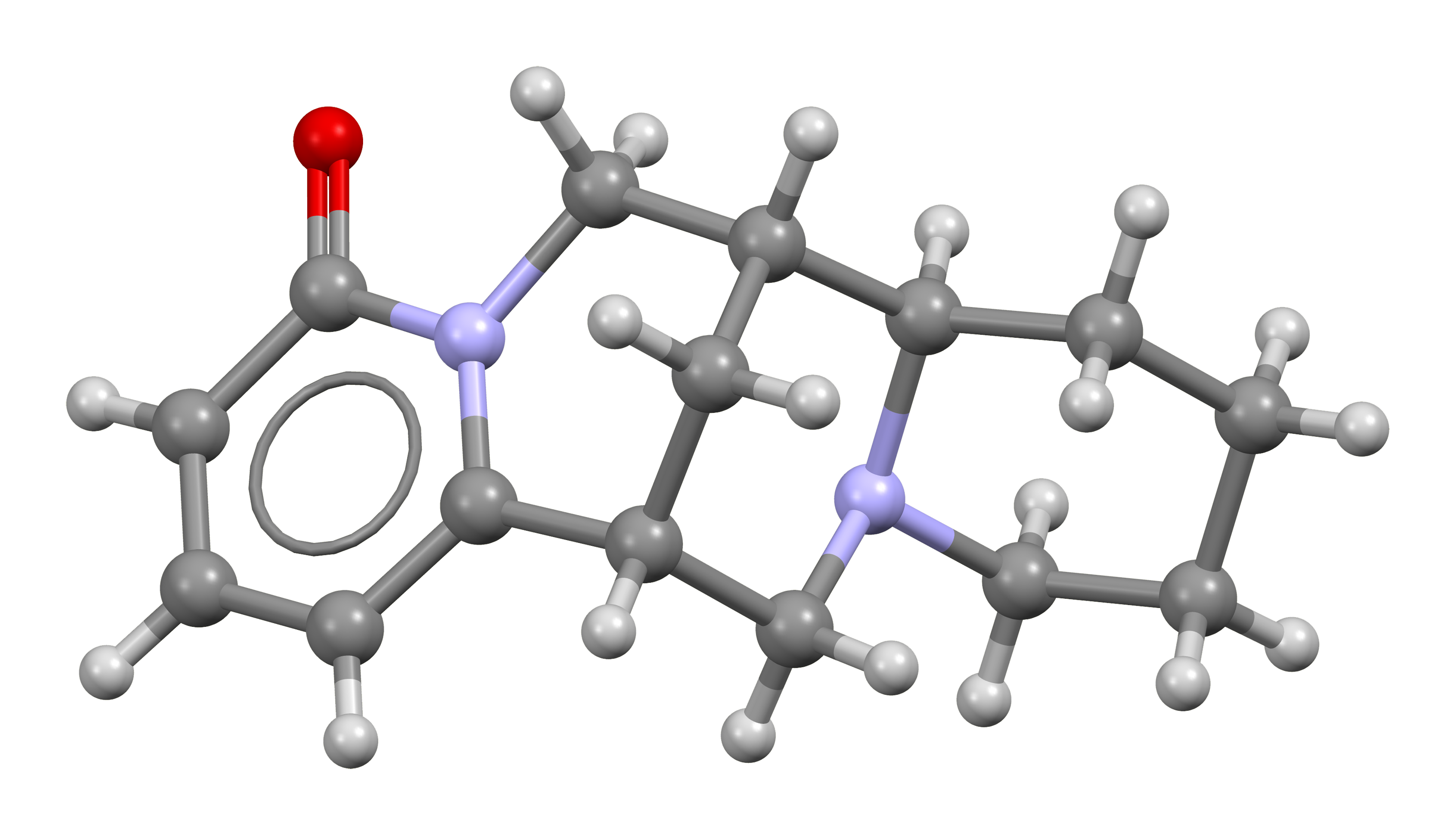
- Ball-and-stick model of anagyrine

Names
- Systematic IUPAC name (7Ξ,7aR,14Ξ)-7,7a,8,9,10,11,13,14-Octahydro-4H,6H-7,14-methanodipyrido[1,2-a:1′,2′-e][1,5]diazocin-4-one
- Other names Rhombinine; Anagyrin; Monolupin; Monolupine; Rhombinin; 3,4,5,6-Tetradehydrospartein-2-one; [7R-(7α,7aβ,14α)]-7,7a,8,9,10,11,13,14-Octahydro-7,14-methano-4H,6H-dipyrido[1,2-a:1′,2′-e][1,5]diazocin-4-one

Identifiers
CAS Number	486-89-5
3D model (JSmol)	Interactive image
ChemSpider	9828
ECHA InfoCard	100.215.995
PubChem CID	10246
UNII	FYU1U980Q9
CompTox Dashboard (EPA)	DTXSID40964091
- InChI: InChI=1S/C15H20N2O/c18-15-6-3-5-14-11-8-12(10-17(14)15)13-4-1-2-7-16(13)9-11/h3,5-6,11-13H,1-2,4,7-10H2/t11?,12?,13-/m1/s1 Key: FQEQMASDZFXSJI-WXRRBKDZSA-N
- SMILES: C1CCN2CC3CC(C2C1)CN4C3=CC=CC4=O

Properties
Chemical formula	C_{15}H_{20}N_{2}O
Molar mass	244.338 g·mol^{−1}
Density	1.22 ±0.1 g/mL
- Except where otherwise noted, data are given for materials in their standard state (at 25 °C [77 °F], 100 kPa). Infobox references

Anagyrine is a teratogenic alkaloid first isolated from (and named for) Anagyris foetida in the year 1885 by French biologists Hardy and Gallois. A. foetida (family Fabaceae), the Stinking Bean Trefoil, is a highly toxic shrub native to the Mediterranean region, with a long history of use in folk medicine. In the year 1939 Anagyrine was found by James Fitton Couch to be identical to an alkaloid present in many species belonging to the plant genus Lupinus (lupins). The toxin can cause crooked calf disease if a cow ingests the plant during certain periods of pregnancy.

== Background ==
The toxicity of certain species of Lupinus plants has been known for several years. The plant is very common in western North America and is sometimes used in feed for cattle if the toxicity of the given lupine is low enough. The toxicity of the plant comes from a variety of toxins, however out of these chemicals anagyrine is the most well known for causing crooked calf disease when ingested by cows. The discovery of anagyrine was made in 1885 by French biologists Ernest Hardy (born Paris 1826) and N. Gallois, who isolated it from the highly toxic legume Anagyris foetida, while the earliest isolation of anagyrine from a lupinus plant was recorded in 1939. The toxin can be found in growing leaf material in a young lupinus plant and in the flower and seed of a mature plant, though varying concentrations of the alkaloid are present throughout lupines that contain anagyrine. It is also found in Thermopsis rhombifolia, though its role in T. rhombifolia toxicity is unknown. The first correlation between anagyrine and crooked calf disease was made by Richard Keeler in 1973. Recently there have been a few successful syntheses of anagyrine recorded, most notably one completed by Diane Gray and Timothy Gallagher.

== Toxicity ==
Anagyrine causes crooked calf disease if 1.44 g/kg of the substance is ingested by the mother cow between days 40 and 70 of pregnancy. Out of the hundreds of varieties of lupinus plants, 23 (listed below) are known to contain high enough concentrations of anagyrine to be dangerous to cattle. The IC_{50} of anagyrine is 132 μM at muscarinic receptors and 2,096 μM at nicotinic receptors.

Common name	Scientific name
Mountain Silvery Lupine	L. alpestris
Arctic Lupine	L. arcticus
Anderson's Lupine	L. andersonii
Spur Lupine	L. arbustus
Silvery Lupine	L. argenteus
Tail Cup Lupine	L. caudatus
unknown	L. cyaneus
Lunara Lupine	L. formosus
unknown	L. greenei
Broad-Leafed Lupine	L. latifolius
Spurred Lupine	L. laxiflorus
White-Leaved Lupine	L. leucophyllus
Nootka Lupine	L. nootaktensis
Plumes Lupine	L. onustus
Meadow Lupine	L. polyphyllus
Rusty Lupine	L. pusillus
Silky Lupine	L. sericeus
Yellow Lupine	L. sulphureus
Burke's Lupine	L. burkei
Seashore Lupine	L. littoralis
Pine Lupine	L. albicaulis
Tall Silvery Lupine	L. erectus
Mt. Rose Lupine	L. montigenus

=== Symptoms ===
Known symptoms of crooked cow disease include arthrogryposis (permanently flexed joints), torticollis (twisting of the neck), scoliosis (curving of the spine), kyphosis (humpback), and cleft plate. It is thought that teratogenic alkaloids like anagyrine cause the deformities by sedating the fetus, causing it to remain fixed in an abnormal position as it grows. Lasting malformations of the calf can occur even in mild poisonings of the cow because fetal movement depression persists much longer between doses of teratogenic alkaloids than the signs of toxicity in the cow.

Symptoms of the alkaloid being ingested by a cow include dyspnea, nervousness, grounding of teeth, depression, salivation, ataxia, spasms, head pressing tremors, seizures, coma, and sometimes death within days of ingestion. If the cattle do not die as a result of alkaloid ingestion, most make a complete recovery with no lasting signs of being poisoned.

== Mechanism of Action ==
While the specific mechanism of action of anagyrine is unknown, the structure of anagyrine allows it to be mistaken for acetylcholine by certain receptors in living organisms. Anagyrine is thought to act as an acetylcholine agonist, increasing the amount of signal being sent to muscles in the organism's body, much like nicotine. Anagyrine interacts with nicotinic and muscarinic acetylcholine receptors, however it binds to muscarinic receptors 16 times more strongly, making it likely that the blocking of muscarinic acetylcholine receptors is what causes crooked calf disease.
