= Scarification (botany) =

Involves weakening, opening, or altering the coat of a seed to encourage germination

Scarification in botany involves weakening, opening, or otherwise altering the coat of a seed to encourage germination. Scarification is often done mechanically, thermally, and chemically. The seeds of many plant species are often impervious to water and gases, thus preventing or delaying germination. Any process designed to make the testa (seed coat) more permeable to water and gases is known as scarification.

Scarification, regardless of type, works by speeding up the natural processes which normally make seed coats permeable to water and air. For drupes (stone fruits), scarification also extends to weakening or removal of the hard endocarp shell around the seed.

== Types ==
Regardless of the method, scarified seeds do not store well and need to be planted quickly, lest the seeds become unviable.

=== Mechanical ===
The most common type of scarification is mechanical scarification.

In mechanical scarification, the testa is physically opened to allow moisture and air in. Seed coats may be filed with a metal file, rubbed with sandpaper, nicked with a knife, cracked gently with a hammer, or weakened or opened in any other way.

=== Temperature ===
==== Hot water ====
The imbibition of water through seed shell membrane is affected by water temperature. Species that can withstand hot water will sprout faster under that condition than from cold tap water.

The North Carolina State University recommends placing the seeds in boiling water and letting them soak while the water cools to room temperature, and then remove the seeds from the water and sow. The buoyancy of floating seeds must be compensated with gravity to submerge them, this can be achieved with an infuser.

Hot water scarification can be combined with chemical scarification, but might require protective equipment against formed gases.

Hot water treatment is also used for removal of pathogens. Placing seeds in 90 °C for 90 seconds followed by dip in cold water for 30 seconds kills the human pathogens Escherichia coli O157:H7 and Salmonella. A variety of plant pathogens are also killed by hot water treatment.

==== Thermal ====
In some chaparral plant communities, some species' seeds require fire and/or smoke to achieve germination. An exception to that phenomenon is western poison oak, whose thick seed coatings provide a time delayed effect for germination, but do not require fire scarification.

=== Chemical ===
Chemical scarification occurs commonly in nature in the course of endozoochory—when animals consume fruits and seeds and their stomach acids soften and begin to break down testae, rendering them more permeable to water. After the seeds have been expelled through defecation they are not only pre-packaged in plant nutrient-rich faeces but also more susceptible to imbibition—the process of water uptake essential to the initiation of germination.

Artificial scarification involves human use of one or more chemicals to mimic the natural stomach acids of frugivorous animals to promote germination. It can involve soaking seeds in precisely concentrated acidic or basic solutions for varying amounts of time. Chemicals such as sulfuric acid or even household chemicals can be used to affect this process. Chemical scarification can also be achieved through the use of nutrient salts such as potassium nitrate.

Common chemicals that don't require special permission in solution form:

- Acids:
  - 25-75% phosphoric acid solution. 25% phosphoric acid is commonly sold by grow shops. 75% phosphoric acid is commonly sold by homebrewing shops.
  - 15% sulphuric acid – swimming pool sanitation chemical. Also a drain cleaner.
- Bases
  - Sodium hydroxide – household chemical for drain cleaning.
- Other
  - 3% hydrogen peroxide – common skin disinfectant.

Pure forms of the chemicals listed above is unnecessary and often require special permission to obtain.

== Common uses ==
Because scarified seeds tend to germinate more often and in less time than unaltered seeds, scarification finds use not just in industry but on the small scale. In home gardens, for example, the seeds of plants which are otherwise difficult to grow from seed may be made viable through scarification. The thawing and freezing of water, fire and smoke and chemical reactions in nature are what allow seeds to germinate but the process can be sped up by using the various methods described thus far. The common objective is opening the testa to allow air and water into the seed. In horticulture, scarification is often used to facilitate the controlled and uniform germination of seed lots.

== Research ==
A paper was published in the New Zealand Journal of Experimental Agriculture in which the authors stated that the seeds they examined in their study germinated only 30% under the preferred conditions, yet when they were treated chemically with concentrated sulphuric acid or mechanically scarified, the germination rate increased to more than 80%.

Another study was done on four different types of Great Basin lupine species to see the effect different methods of scarification would have on said seeds. The longspur lupine, silvery lupine, hairy bigleaf lupin, and silky lupine were the four species experimented on throughout the study. Species exhibited differential responses to scarification. The Silky lupine's highest germination rate was achieved via mechanical scarification at 66.4%, opposed to its 22% germination rate found in the control group. Using thermal and chemical scarification, germination increased to 48.8% and 44% respectively. 68% of Longspur lupine seeds germinated in the control group, while all scarification methods decreased the success rate of germination. The silvery lupine had 52% of its control group germinate but through mechanical scarification it rose to 85.2%. Finally the hairy bigleaf lupine's control group germination rate was 32% yet when treated with sulfuric acid it rose to 76.8%.

== See also ==
- Stratification (seeds)
