= Dwarf lupine =

Dwarf lupine is a common name for several lupines and may refer to:

- Lupinus caespitosus
- Lupinus lepidus
- Lupinus lyallii, dwarf mountain lupine
- Lupinus nanus
- Lupinus pusillus

Several other species of lupines which are cultivated as ornamentals have low growing dwarf cultivars. Ornamental species with dwarf cultivars include:

- Lupinus hartwegii
- Lupinus polyphyllus
