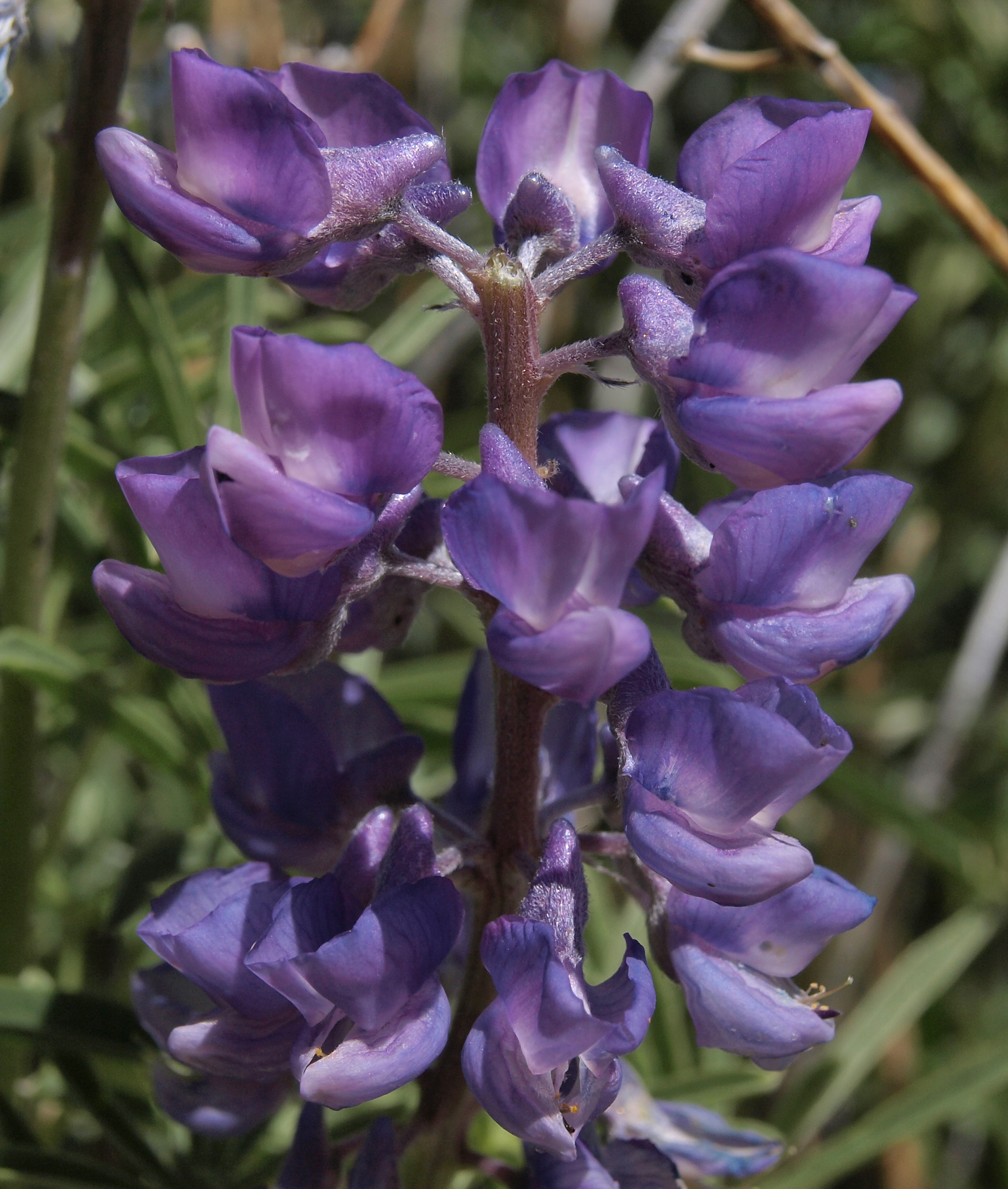

Conservation status
- Secure (NatureServe)

Scientific classification
- Kingdom: Plantae
- Clade: Tracheophytes
- Clade: Angiosperms
- Clade: Eudicots
- Clade: Rosids
- Order: Fabales
- Family: Fabaceae
- Subfamily: Faboideae
- Genus: Lupinus
- Species: L. caudatus

Binomial name
- Lupinus caudatus Kellogg

SubspeciesInfraspecifics
- Lupinus caudatus var. argophyllus (A.Gray) S.L.Welsh; Lupinus caudatus subsp. caudatus; Lupinus caudatus var. cutleri (Eastw.) S.L.Welsh; Lupinus caudatus subsp. montigenus (A.Heller) L.W.Hess & D.B.Dunn; Lupinus caudatus var. utahensis (S.Watson) S.L.Welsh

= Lupinus caudatus =

Species of flowering plant in the legume family

Lupinus caudatus is a widespread species of wildflower in genus Lupinus from western North America known by the common names tailcup lupin and spurred lupin. It is distinctive for the short spur on its purple-blue flowers, for which it is named. Because of its wide distribution and toxicity it commonly causes poisonings of susceptible livestock such as horses, cattle, and sheep, though it is eaten without harm by wild herbivores like deer and elk. It is generally found from the Coastal Ranges and Sierra Nevada Mountains in the west to the Rocky Mountains in the east.

== Description ==
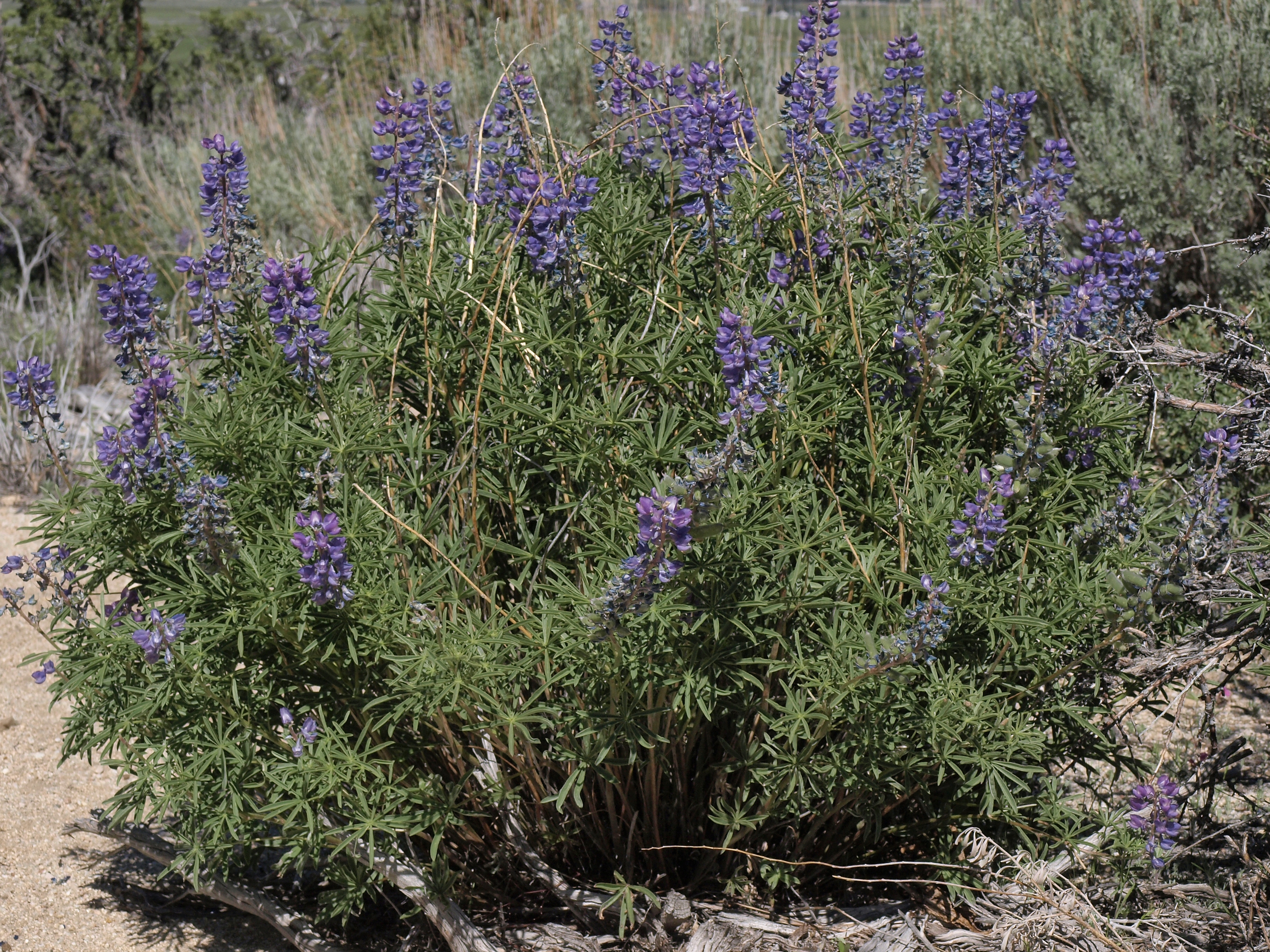
Tailcup lupine, Lupinus caudatus

Lupinus caudatus is a cool-season herbaceous perennial plant. It develops a thick, deep taproot topped with a woody structure at the base of the stems at the top of the root at or just below ground level (a caudex). From this caudex it has flowering stems that may be branched or unbranched. Most of its leaves grow on individual leaf stems at the base of the plant (basal leaves) which are 6–10 centimeters (2.4–3.9 in) long. Each leaf is divided into 5–10 smaller leaflets attached together at a central point forming a rounded fan (palmate compound). The leaflets are most often 2–4 cm (0.8–1.6 in) long, but may occasionally reach as much as 6 cm (2.4 in). They are 4–8 millimeters wide and are narrow with a shape like reversed spear point, wider nearer the end than at the base (linear-oblanceolate) with a sharp point with the leaf rib extending slightly beyond the leaf margin at the tip (mucronate). The leaves are densely covered by fine hairs that lay flat on both the upper and lower surfaces giving them the appearance being covered in combed silk (sericeous) and the sides of the leaflets often bend inwards until they almost touch (conduplicate).

Lupinus caudatus has flowering stems that are 20–80 centimeters tall depending on local conditions. The stems may be branched or unbranched and end with a 4–10 centimeter long inflorescence (terminal raceme) with many flowers. The flowers are arranged in groups surrounding the stem (verticils) that are about 10-12 millimeters apart with each flower supported on a smaller stem (pedicel) 2–4 millimeters long.

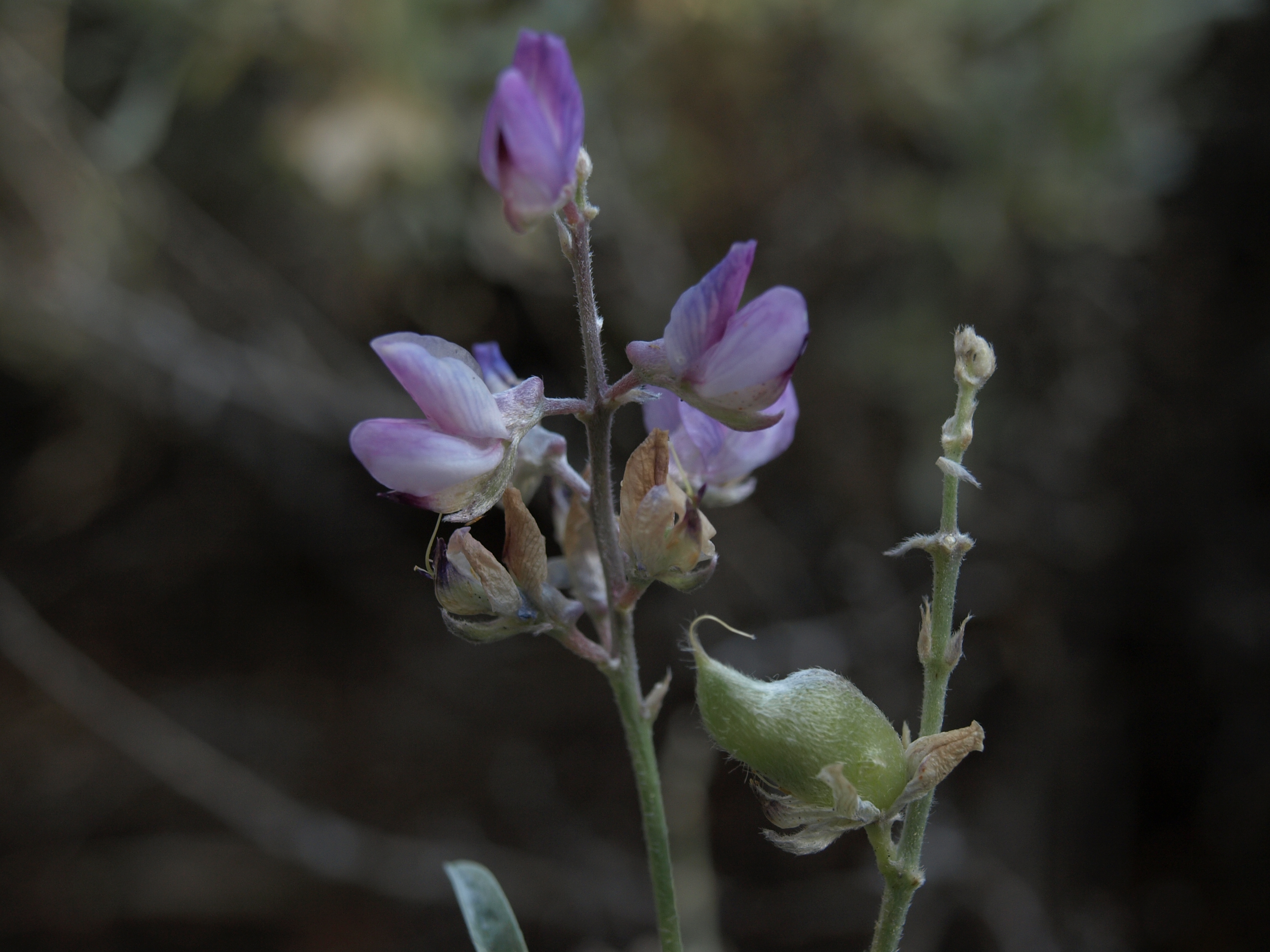
Tailcup lupine in Nevada, White Mountains, Middle Creek, Fishlake Valley drainage, elevation 2539 m

The flowers of Lupinus caudatus are 8–12 millimeters long with a conspicuous blunt spur that is 0.4–1 millimeter long. Most often the flowers are blue-purple in color, but occasionally they will be white. The banner petal is covered with hairs (pubescent) on its back side and its front grove. The lower lip, also called the keel, is often at least partially fringed with hairs (ciliate). The blooming period begins in May in Utah and Colorado. While it begins in June in Wyoming and Montana.

The fruit of Lupinus caudatus is a pod 25–30 millimeters long and 8–9 millimeters wide, and like the leaves is densely covered with shining silky hairs. Each pod will contain 4–6 seeds. The diploid (2n) chromosome count for L. caudatus is either 48 or 96.

Though Lupinus species often interbreed or hybridize to form intermediate individuals, there are two characteristics that help to distinguish Lupinus caudatus from the very similar Lupinus argenteus. The combination of the short spur and with a hairy banner petal will most often serve to distinguish L. caudatus. Hybrids between them will have a shorter spur and usually have a smooth banner petal. Lupinus sericeus is also very similar, especially the variety L. sericeus var. utahensis, because it also has a hairy banner petal. It, however, will have more widely spaced flowers, lacks the spur, and does not have basal leaves with long stems when it is flowering.

== Taxonomy ==
Lupinus caudatus was first scientifically described and named in 1863 by Albert Kellogg, one of the founders of the California Academy of Sciences. As of 2023 it is accepted as a valid species by Plants of the World Online (POWO), World Flora Online (WFO), and the USDA Natural Resources Conservation Service PLANTS database (PLANTS). On the other hand, it is often combined into Lupinus argenteus as one or more subspecies or varieties.

=== Subspecies and varieties ===
According to POWO there are five subspecies or varieties of Lupinus caudatus, including the nominate subspecies. However, there is much disagreement between authorities on which should be recognized due to many species easily hybridizing with each other.

Lupinus caudatus var. argophyllus (A.Gray) S.L.Welsh
This variety is also listed as accepted by WFO and PLANTS. Synonyms for it listed by POWO are Lupinus argenteus var. argophyllus (A.Gray) S.Watson, Lupinus argophyllus (A.Gray) Cockerell, Lupinus caespitosus var. argophyllus (A.Gray) S.L.Welsh, Lupinus caudatus subsp. argophyllus (A.Gray) L.Ll.Phillips, Lupinus decumbens var. argophyllus A.Gray, and Lupinus laxiflorus var. argophyllus (A.Gray) M.E.Jones.

Lupinus caudatus subsp. caudatus
As the nominate subspecies (autonym) it is accepted by the same authorities as the species. PLANTS records it in the western United States from the Pacific Ocean to the Rocky Mountains, excluding New Mexico, and also the state of Nebraska. However, POWO only has records for it in California, Nevada, and Oregon.

Lupinus caudatus var. cutleri (Eastw.) S.L.Welsh
This variety is also listed as accepted by WFO and PLANTS. Synonyms for it listed by POWO are Lupinus caudatus subsp. cutleri (Eastw.) L.W.Hess & D.B.Dunn and Lupinus cutleri Eastw.

Lupinus caudatus subsp. montigenus (A.Heller) L.W.Hess & D.B.Dunn
This variety is also listed as accepted by WFO and PLANTS. Synonyms for it listed by POWO are Lupinus argenteus var. montigenus (A.Heller) Barneby and Lupinus montigenus A.Heller.

Lupinus caudatus var. utahensis (S.Watson) S.L.Welsh
This variety is also listed as accepted by WFO, but not by PLANTS. Synonyms for it listed by POWO are Lupinus argenteus var. utahensis (S.Watson) Barneby and Lupinus holosericeus var. utahensis S.Watson.

=== Names ===
The species name is Latin meaning tailed (from cauda, tail) describing the short spur, a backward projection on the upper part of the sepals. This part is also called the outer floral cup (calyx) and this is the origin of the common name "tailcup lupin". Another common name is the "spurred lupine", also referencing this structure, but this name is shared with Lupinus laxiflorus when it is considered a valid species. It is also known by the common names "Cutler's spurred lupine" and "Kellogg's spurred lupine".

== Range and habitat ==
Lupinus caudatus is found throughout the western United States from the Rocky Mountains to the Sierra Nevadas and Cascades from occurrences recorded in the PLANTS database. It also records it in the Texas panhandle, Oklahoma, Nebraska, and South Dakota. The Global Biodiversity Information Facility (GBIF) also has a record of the single undated preserved specimen from Alberta, Canada. GBIF also has numerous specimens records from Mexico under the synonymized name Lupinus lupinus collected from the states of Baja California, Baja California Sur, and Durango. POWO also records it growing in North Dakota, but lacks records of it growing in Washington State, Nebraska, South Dakota, Oklahoma, Texas, or any part of Mexico.

The usual habitat for Lupinus caudatus is moderately dry, well-drained soils. It is a common feature of open hillsides and road cuts, and will occasionally be found in moderately moist meadows. It will grow with sagebrush or in open timber stands, it is especially noted for being found with the ponderosa pine (Pinus ponderosa). Other habitats where it can be found include desert scrub and mountain or foothill chaparral. It is a fairly common plant in much of its range and is often found in great numbers locally. Its approximate maximum elevation is about 3150 meters in Colorado and minimum is 1450 meters in Utah.

=== Conservation ===
Lupinus caudatus was evaluated by NatureServe as globally secure (G5) in 2003. At the state level they evaluated it as critically imperiled (S1) in Arizona and apparently secure (S4) in Nevada, but has not yet evaluated its status for any other state as of 2023.

== Ecology ==
Lupinus caudatus is eaten by elk, mule deer, whitetail deer, antelope, upland game birds, small non-game birds, and small mammals. Observational studies have not found native wild animals to be poisoned by it. For pocket gophers on the Columbia Plateau in June, it is a very important source of forage. More than two-thirds of all the forb shoots consumed were observed to be of this species and the leaves were also readily consumed in one study. Because it is one of the more palatable Lupinus species, it is also eaten by sheep, cattle, and horses, sometimes to their detriment.

While it will also persist in mature landscapes, Lupinus caudatus is generally increased by disturbances. Many plants will survive wildfires and in the next season will set seed to recolonize the open landscape. While they are good at colonizing open ground and low fertility soils, they lack a dense mat of roots and so are ineffective at preventing erosion in disturbed landscapes.

== Toxicity ==
Lupinus caudatus, like many of its relatives in the genus Lupinus, is responsible for the congenital deformation of cattle calves called "crooked calf" by ranchers. This condition is now more formally known as "lupine induced arthrogryposis" and its symptoms include flexure of the front leg joints, twisting of the neck, curvature of the spinal column, and cleft palate. L. caudatus and Lupinus sericeus were the first two species identified as causing crooked calf. The toxin in L. caudatus that is responsible for the disease is the quinolizidine alkaloid anagyrine, though some other species contain a different teratogenic compound. It also can poison adult cattle when larger amounts are consumed, with symptoms including general weakness, muscular trembling, convulsions, and prostration.
