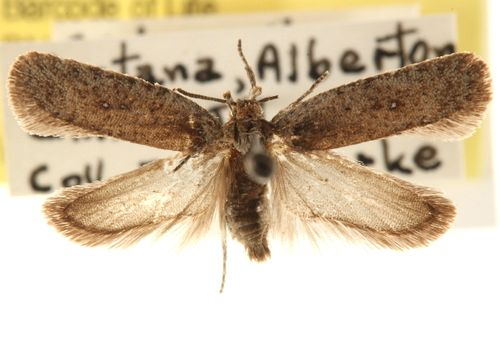

Scientific classification
- Kingdom: Animalia
- Phylum: Arthropoda
- Clade: Pancrustacea
- Class: Insecta
- Order: Lepidoptera
- Family: Depressariidae
- Genus: Agonopterix
- Species: A. muricolorella

Binomial name
- Agonopterix muricolorella (Busck, 1902)

Synonyms
- Depressaria muricolorella Busck, 1902

= Agonopterix muricolorella =

Species of moth

Agonopterix muricolorella is a moth in the family Depressariidae. It was described by August Busck in 1902. It is found in North America, where it has been recorded from Colorado, eastern Oregon and eastern Washington.

The wingspan is about 17 mm. The forewings are dark mouse gray with a purple tinge towards the apex and round the edges and also sprinkled with sparse black scales. The base and the basal part of the costa somewhat lighter than the rest of the wing. The hindwings are shining dark gray.

The larvae feed on Lomatium macrocarpum, Lomatium grayi and Leptotaenia multifida.
