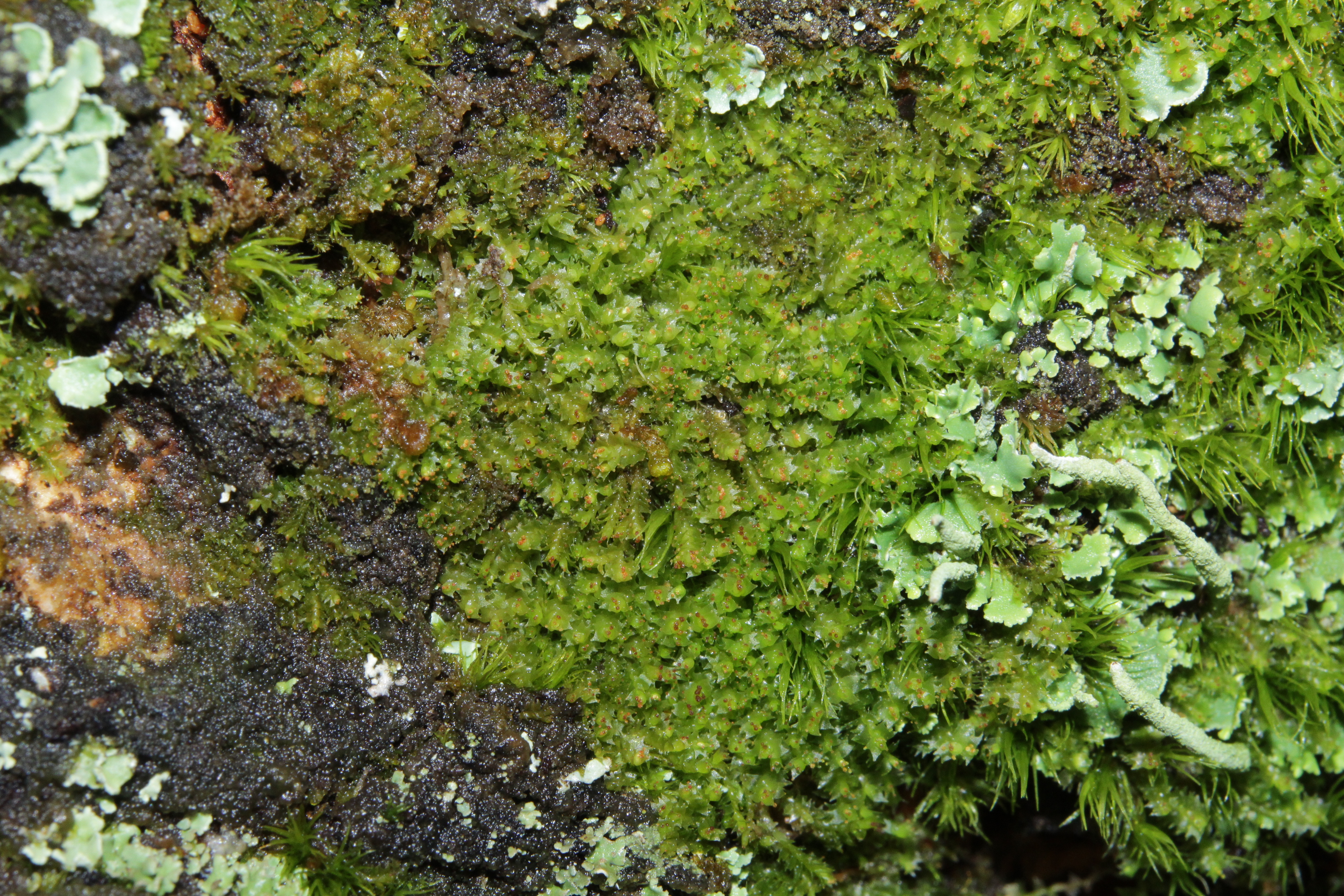

Scientific classification
- Kingdom: Plantae
- Division: Marchantiophyta
- Class: Jungermanniopsida
- Order: Lophoziales
- Family: Lophoziaceae
- Genus: Lophozia
- Species: L. longidens

Binomial name
- Lophozia longidens (Lindb.) Macoun

= Lophozia longidens =

Species of liverwort

Lophozia longidens is a species of liverwort belonging to the family Lophoziaceae. Synonym:

- Lophozia longidens subsp. longidens
