= Lomatium papilioniferum =

Scientific classification
- Kingdom: Plantae
- Clade: Embryophytes
- Clade: Tracheophytes
- Clade: Spermatophytes
- Clade: Angiosperms
- Clade: Eudicots
- Clade: Asterids
- Order: Apiales
- Family: Apiaceae
- Genus: Lomatium
- Species: L. papilioniferum

Binomial name
- Lomatium papilioniferum J.A.Alexander & Whaley

Species of plant

Lomatium papilioniferum is a species of Lomatium previously included in the Lomatium grayi complex. It is native from southern British Columbia to northern California and east to Idaho and Nevada. It occurs in dry lowland areas including sagebrush desert.

== Description ==
Adapted from: Lomatium papilioniferum is a malodorous, glabrous perennial growing from a long, stout taproot and branching woody base comprising several stems 15 to 50 cm (6 to 20 in) tall. Leaves are borne near the base of the stem and are highly dissected into very numerous leaflets. The inflorescence a compound umbel bearing small bright yellow flowers.
