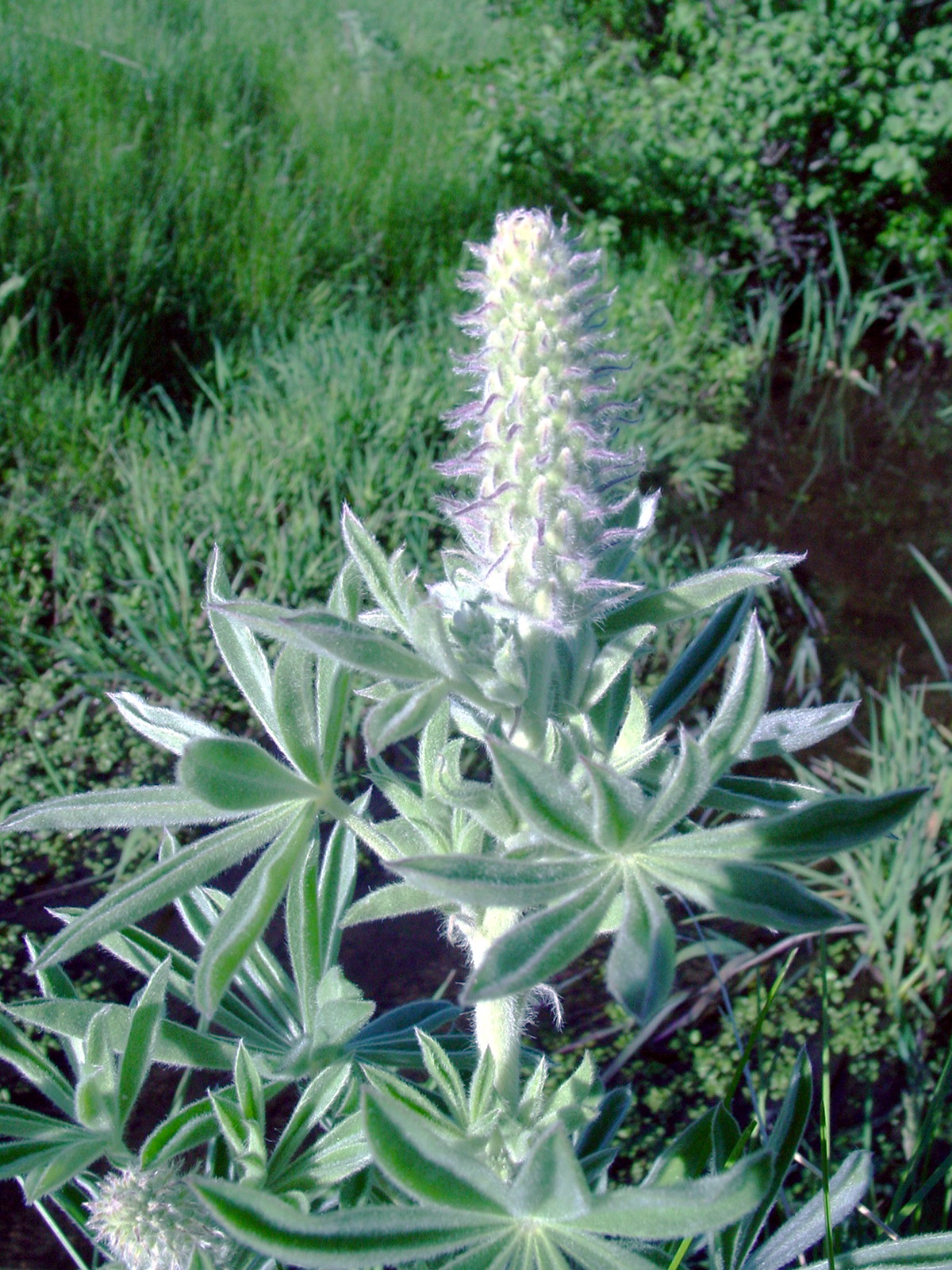

Scientific classification
- Kingdom: Plantae
- Clade: Tracheophytes
- Clade: Angiosperms
- Clade: Eudicots
- Clade: Rosids
- Order: Fabales
- Family: Fabaceae
- Subfamily: Faboideae
- Genus: Lupinus
- Species: L. leucophyllus

Binomial name
- Lupinus leucophyllus Dougl. ex Lindl.

= Lupinus leucophyllus =

Species of legume

Lupinus leucophyllus is a species of lupine known by the common name velvet lupine. It is native to western North America, where it grows in many types of mountain, prairie, and plateau habitat. It is a robust, branching, erect perennial herb growing up to 90 centimetres (35 in) tall. Each palmate leaf is divided into 7 to 11 leaflets up to 7 centimetres (2.8 in) long. The herbage is coated in white woolly fibers and stiff hairs. The inflorescence is dense raceme of many flowers, each around a centimeter long. The flower is purple in color, fading brown, the patch on the banner petal yellow or brownish. The pointed sepals and the back of the banner are hairy to woolly in texture.

This is one of several poisonous lupines that are dangerous to grazing livestock. The plant contains toxic alkaloids including lupinine and the teratogenic anagyrine.

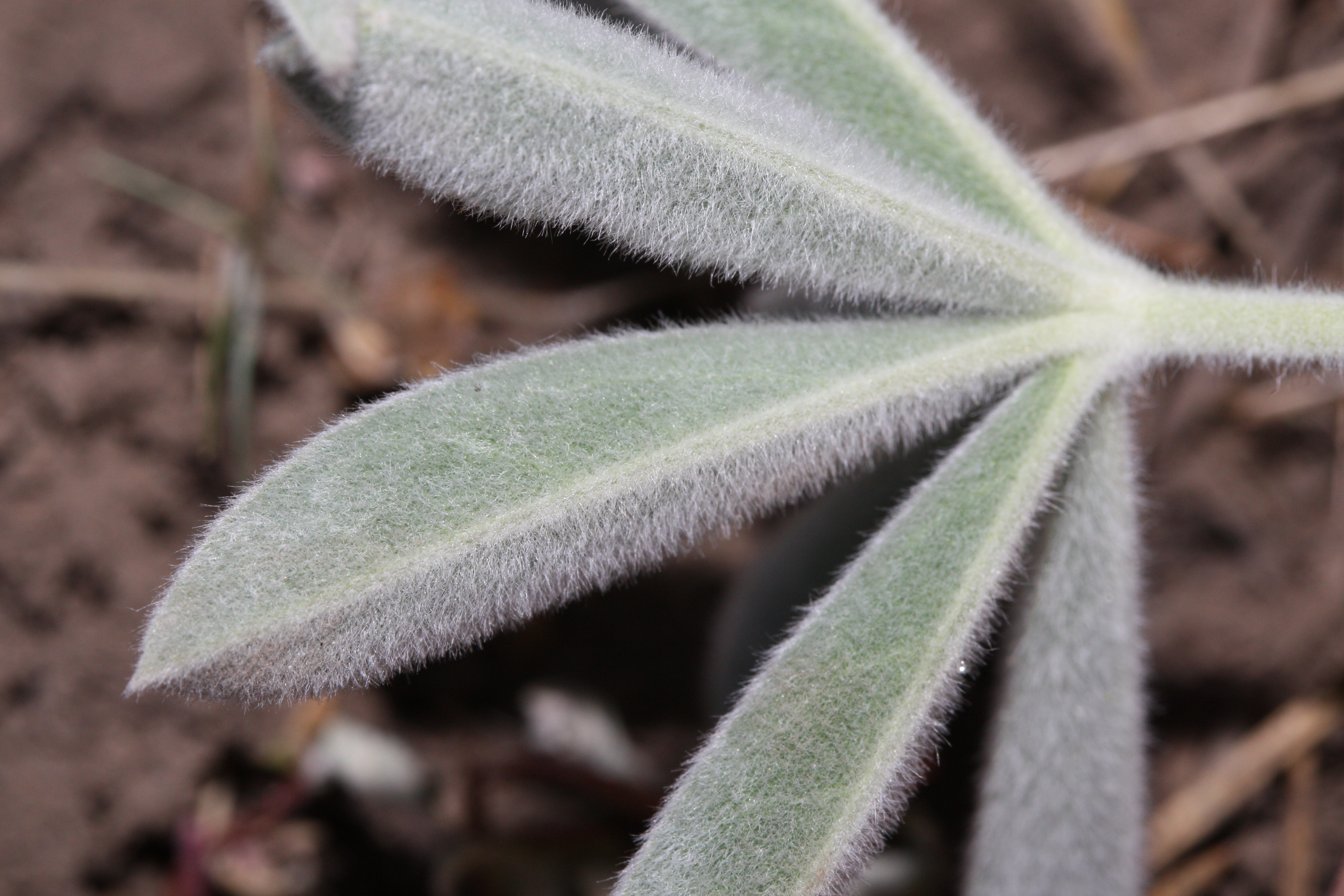
Leaves with white woolly fibers and stiff hairs (Wenas Wildlife Area, Washington)
