= Leptobryum =

Scientific classification
- Kingdom: Plantae
- Division: Bryophyta
- Class: Bryopsida
- Subclass: Bryidae
- Order: Bryales
- Family: Bryaceae
- Genus: Leptobryum (Schimp.) Wilson

Genus of mosses

Leptobryum is a genus of mosses belonging to the family Bryaceae.

The genus has cosmopolitan distribution.

Species:

- Leptobryum acutum (Hedw.) Gugelb.
- Leptobryum patagonicum Broth.
- Leptobryum pyriforme (Hedw.) Wilson
