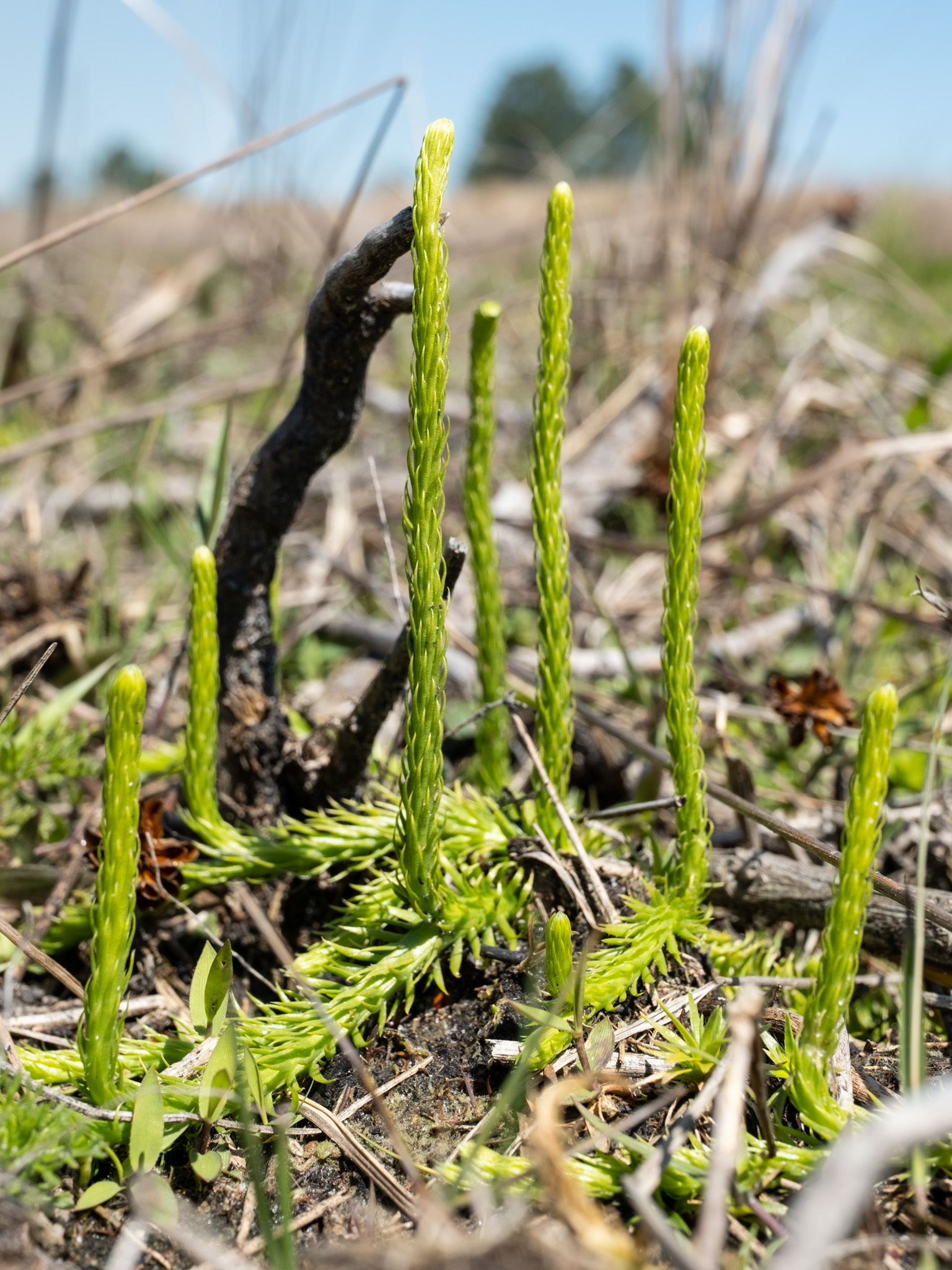

Scientific classification
- Kingdom: Plantae
- Clade: Tracheophytes
- Clade: Lycophytes
- Class: Lycopodiopsida
- Order: Lycopodiales
- Family: Lycopodiaceae
- Genus: Lycopodiella
- Species: L. appressa

Binomial name
- Lycopodiella appressa (Chapman) Cranfill

Synonyms
- Lycopodium appressum

= Lycopodiella appressa =

Species of spore-bearing plant

Lycopodiella appressa, commonly known as southern bog clubmoss, is a species of clubmoss. It is native to eastern North America, including Cuba and the West Indies. In the United States, it is primarily found on the Coastal Plain.

Its natural habitat is open wet areas, such as bogs, seeps, and pond shores.
