= Leaflet (botany) =

In botany, the ultimate unit of a compound leaf

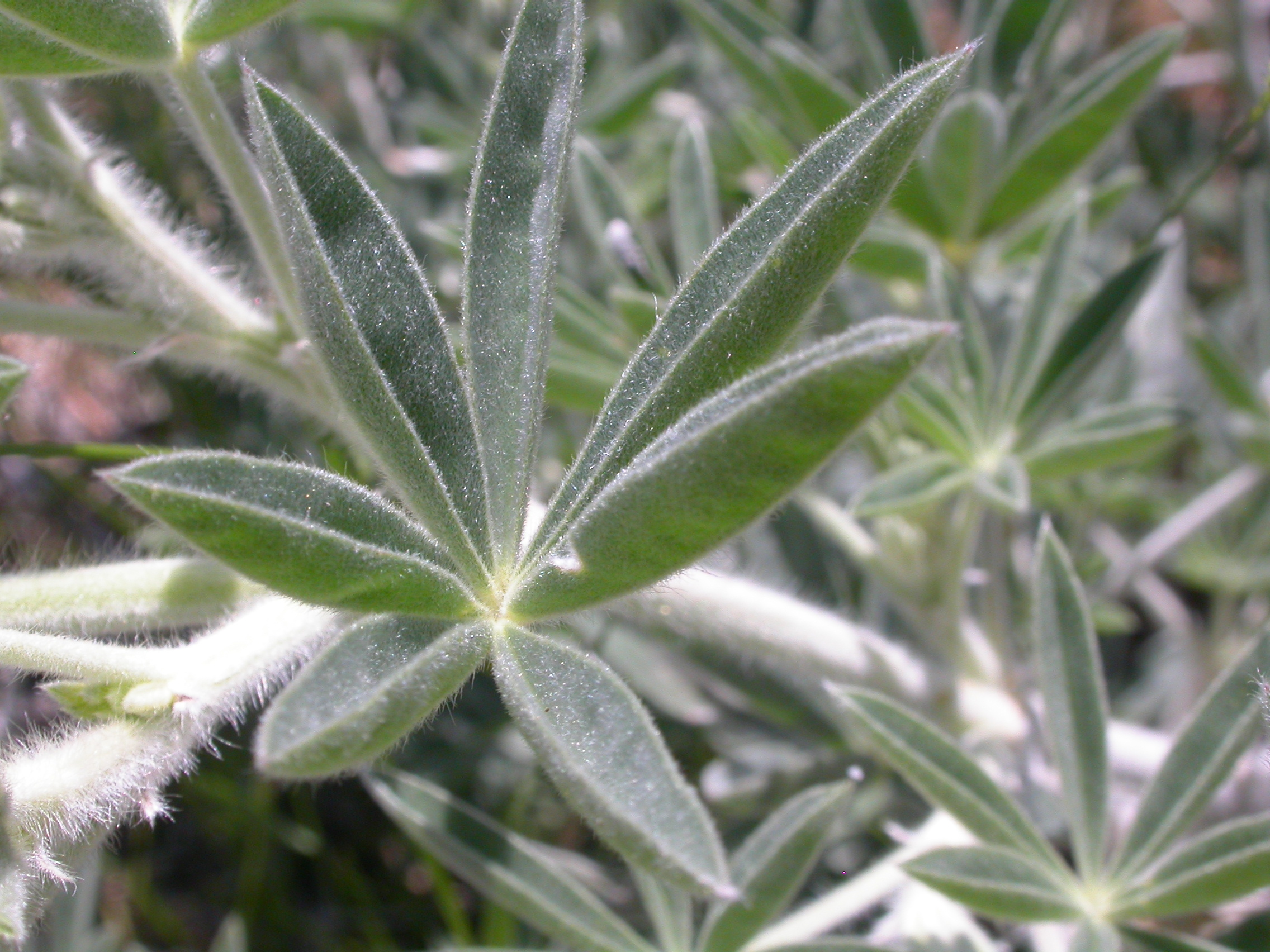
Palmate compound leaf of the Lupinus sericeus with leaflets

A leaflet (occasionally called foliole) in botany is a leaf-like part of a compound leaf. Though it resembles an entire leaf, a leaflet is not borne on a main plant stem or branch, as a leaf is, but rather on a petiole or a branch of the leaf.

Compound leaves are common in many plant families and they differ widely in morphology. The two main classes of compound leaf morphology are palmate and pinnate. For example, a hemp plant has palmate compound leaves, as does the Lupinus sericeus which typically has 6-9 silky leaflets, whereas some species of Acacia have pinnate leaves.

The ultimate division (or leaflet) of a compound leaf, or a pinnate subdivision of a multipinnate leaf is called a pinnule or pinnula.

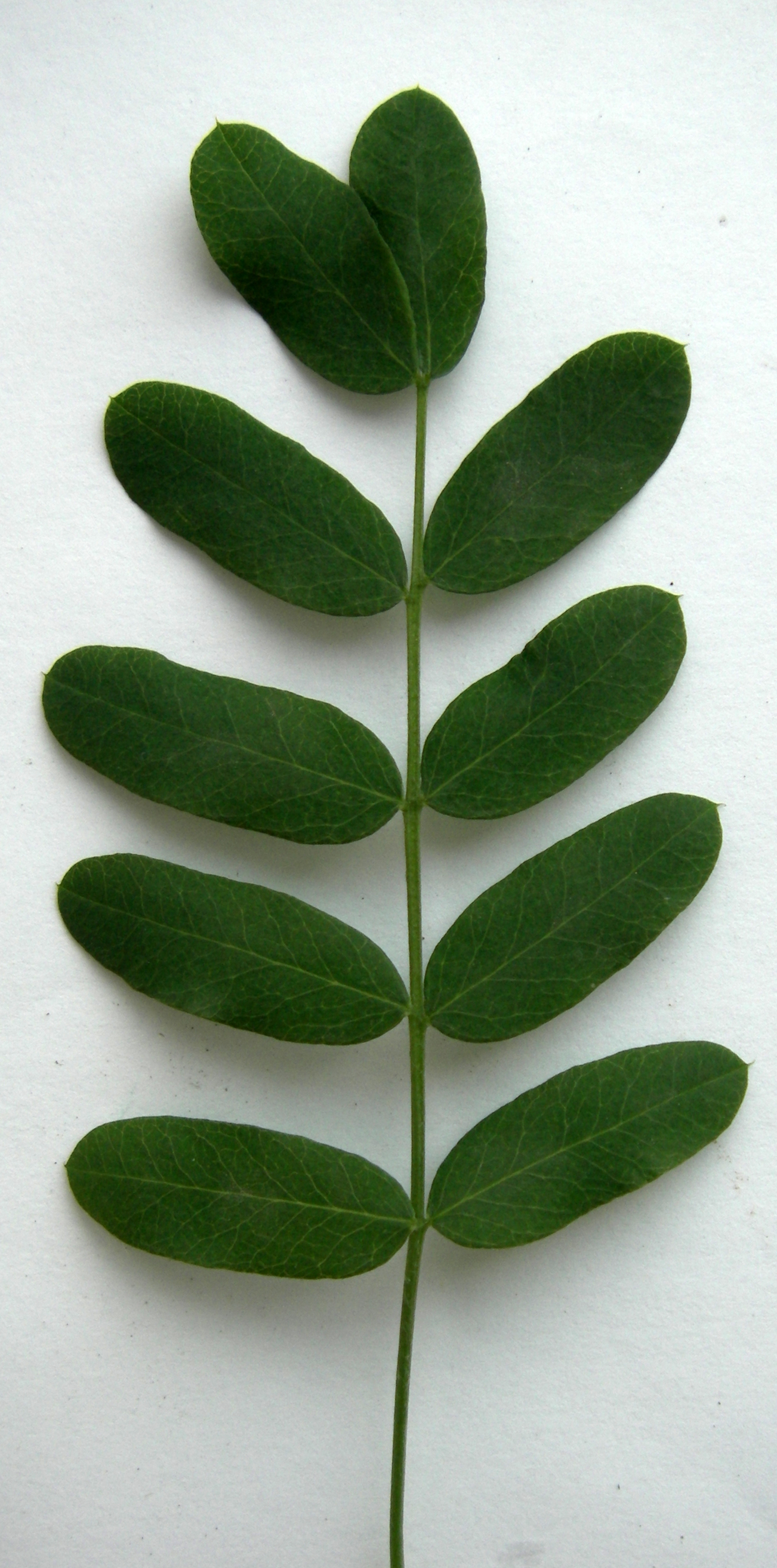
Pinnate leaf of a legume with 10 leaflets.

Mimosa pudica folding leaflets inward.

The different shapes of leaflets can be described as elliptical, oval, lanceolate or other shapes. Leaflets can be divided in different ways; for example, unipinnate, which is a simple pinnate with leaflets, where no more divisions occur (e.g. Cassia), bipinnate, which has secondary leaflets, with each leaflet dividing into another set of leaflets (e.g. Acacia) and tripinnate, where further division occurs after the secondary leaflets (e.g. Moringa).

It can be difficult to tell the difference between a leaf and a leaflet, because leaflets look like a small leaf, but are actually a segment of a compound leaf and are also not attached to the stem. Leaflets do not ever have axillary buds.

== Etymology ==
Leaflet includes the words leaf and let. Leaf originates from an Old English word that reflects a plant’s foliage. The suffix -“let”, comes from a Middle English and Old French word, meaning lesser or smaller of something. Leaflet therefore means a "petite version of a typical leaf structure”.

== See also ==
- Compound leaf
