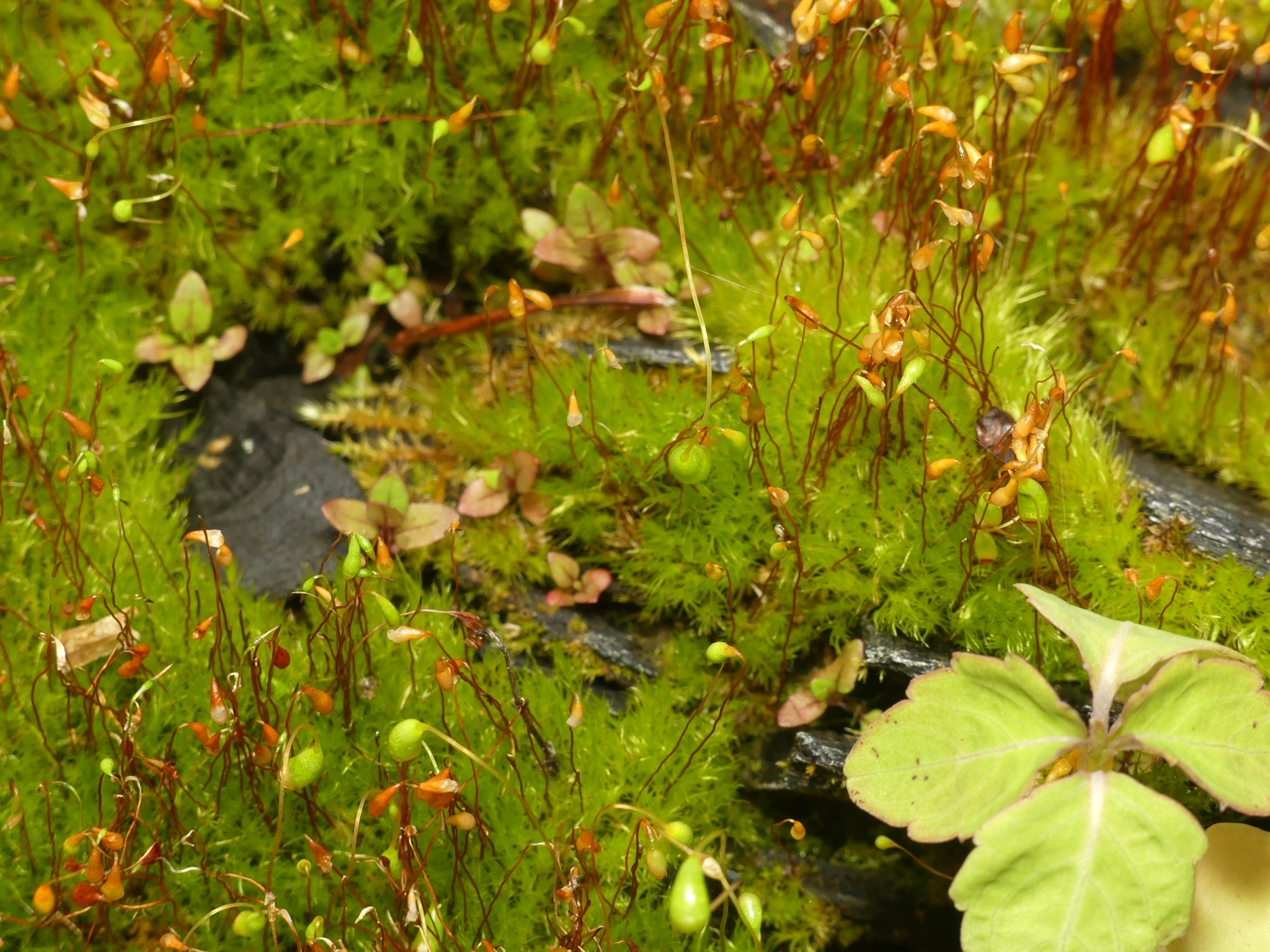

Scientific classification
- Kingdom: Plantae
- Division: Bryophyta
- Class: Bryopsida
- Subclass: Bryidae
- Order: Bryales
- Family: Bryaceae
- Genus: Leptobryum
- Species: L. pyriforme

Binomial name
- Leptobryum pyriforme (Hedw.) Wilson

= Leptobryum pyriforme =

Species of moss

Leptobryum pyriforme is a species of moss belonging to the family Bryaceae.

It has a cosmopolitan distribution.

Leptobryum pyriforme is known for its ability to utilize artificial light to grow in environments that are otherwise devoid of natural light, such as Crystal Cave in Wisconsin.
