= Lupinus onustus =

Scientific classification
- Kingdom: Plantae
- Clade: Tracheophytes
- Clade: Angiosperms
- Clade: Eudicots
- Clade: Rosids
- Order: Fabales
- Family: Fabaceae
- Subfamily: Faboideae
- Genus: Lupinus
- Species: L. onustus

Binomial name
- Lupinus onustus S.Watson

Species of legume

Lupinus onustus is a species of lupine known by the common name Plumas lupine. It is native to the high mountains of northern California, from the northern Sierra Nevada to the Klamath Mountains where its distribution extends just into Oregon. It grows in mountain forest habitat, sometimes on serpentine soils. It is a perennial herb with a short, decumbent stem and erect inflorescence reaching heights of 20–30 centimeters (8–12 in). Each palmate leaf is made up of 5 to 9 leaflets up to 5 centimeters long. The stout inflorescence bears many unwhorled flowers each around a centimeter long. The flower is partly or entirely purple in color.
