= Lophozia wenzelii =

Scientific classification
- Kingdom: Plantae
- Division: Marchantiophyta
- Class: Jungermanniopsida
- Order: Lophoziales
- Family: Lophoziaceae
- Genus: Lophozia
- Species: L. wenzelii

Binomial name
- Lophozia wenzelii (Nees) Steph.

Species of liverwort

Lophozia wenzelii is a species of liverwort belonging to the family Lophoziaceae.

It is native to Eurasia and Northern America.
