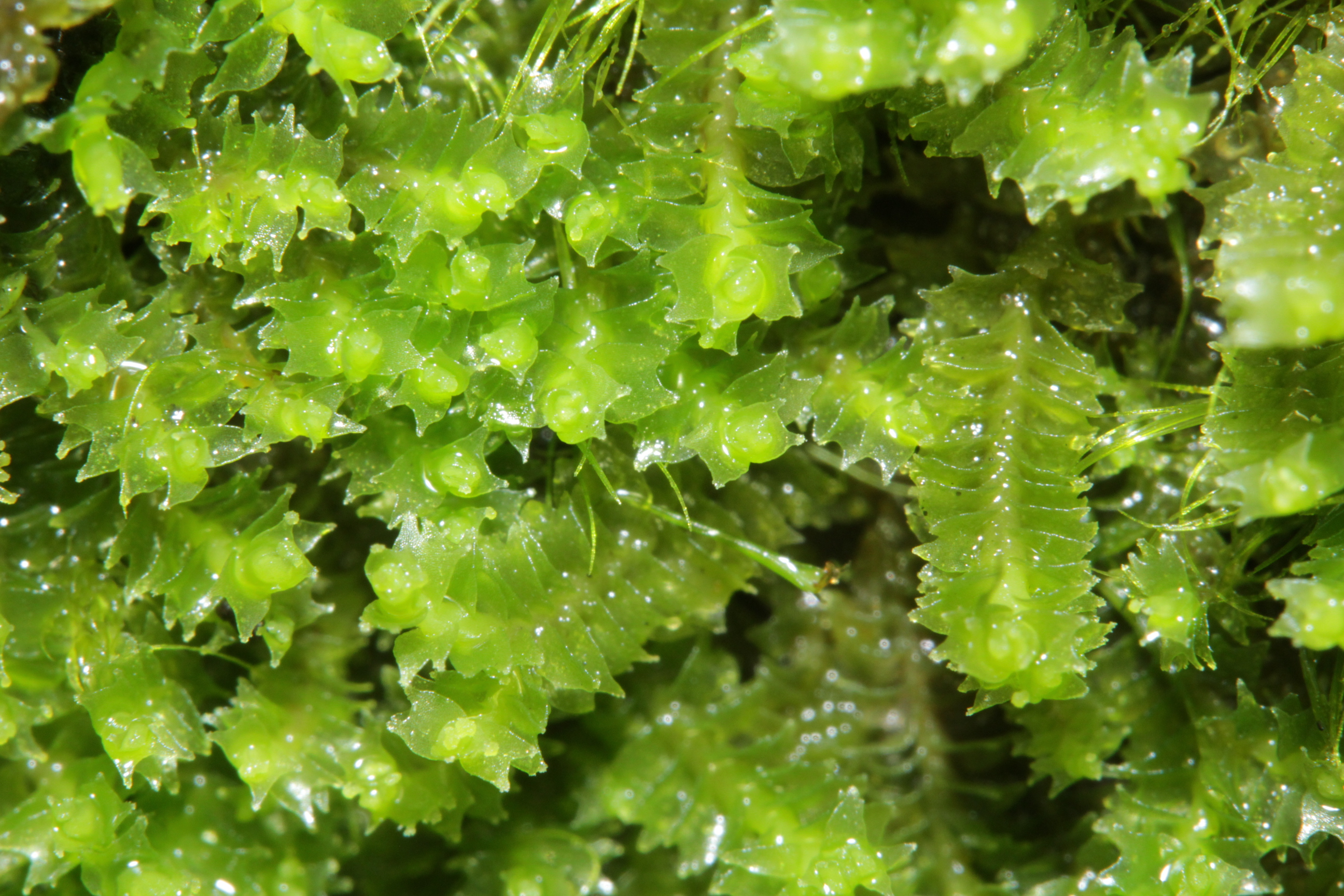
- Lophozia ventricosa

Scientific classification
- Kingdom: Plantae
- Division: Marchantiophyta
- Class: Jungermanniopsida
- Order: Lophoziales
- Family: Lophoziaceae
- Genus: Lophozia (Dumort.) Dumort.

Synonyms
- Lophozea; Porphyroleuca (C.Hartm.) Schiffn.; Pseudolophozia Konstant. & Vilnet

= Lophozia =

Genus of liverworts

Lophozia is a genus of liverworts belonging to the family Lophoziaceae. The genus was first described by Barthélemy Charles Joseph Dumortier.

The genus has cosmopolitan distribution, but mainly in the Northern Hemisphere.

== Species ==
As accepted by GBIF;

- Lophozia ascendens (Warnst.) R.M.Schust.
- Lophozia atlantica (Kaal.) K.Mueller
- Lophozia austrosibirica Bakalin
- Lophozia autoica R.M.Schust.
- Lophozia bantriensis (Hook.) Jörg.
- Lophozia bicrenata (Schmidel ex Hoffm.) Dumort.
- Lophozia boliviensis Steph.
- Lophozia chichibuensis Inoue
- Lophozia chinensis Stephani
- Lophozia ciliata Damsh., L.Söderstr. & H.Weibull
- Lophozia cornuta (Steph.) S.Hatt.
- Lophozia crispata R.M.Schust.
- Lophozia curiossima Horik.
- Lophozia debiliformis R.M.Schust. & Damsh.
- Lophozia decurrentia Horik.
- Lophozia druceaea Grolle & E.A.Hodgs.
- Lophozia formosana Horik.
- Lophozia fuscovirens Bakalin & Vilnet
- Lophozia grandiretis (Lindb. ex Kaal.) Schiffn.
- Lophozia groenlandica (Gottsche, Lindenb. & Nees) Macoun
- Lophozia guttulata (Lindb. & Arnell) A.Evans
- Lophozia gymnocoleopsis R.M.Schust. & J.J.Engel
- Lophozia hamatiloba Grolle
- Lophozia handelii Herzog
- Lophozia herzogiana E.A.Hodgs. & Grolle
- Lophozia heterocolpos (Thed. ex Hartm.) H.Buch
- Lophozia holmenianum Inoue & Steere
- Lophozia igiana S.Hatt.
- Lophozia inaequalis Lehm. & Lindenb.
- Lophozia incisa (Schrad.) Dumort.
- Lophozia indica S.Srivast., S.C.Srivast. & K.K.Rawat
- Lophozia iremelensis Schljakov
- Lophozia jamaicensis (Nees) Steph.
- Lophozia jurensis Meyl. ex K.Müller
- Lophozia kinangopii Gola
- Lophozia kutscheri Grolle
- Lophozia lacerata N.Kitag.
- Lophozia lancistipa (Grolle) R.M.Schust.
- Lophozia lantratovae Bakalin
- Lophozia lantratoviae Bakalin
- Lophozia latifolia R.M.Schust.
- Lophozia laxepinnata Spruce
- Lophozia laxifolia (Mont.) Grolle
- Lophozia macrocolea Spruce
- Lophozia mamatkulovii Duda
- Lophozia mayebarae (S.Hatt.) N.Kitag.
- Lophozia monoica (E.A.Hodgs.) J.J.Engel
- Lophozia montaguensis S.W.Arnell
- Lophozia morrisoncola Horik.
- Lophozia muelleriana Schiffner
- Lophozia multiflora Steph.
- Lophozia murmanica Kaal.
- Lophozia nakanishii Inoue
- Lophozia navicularis Stephani
- Lophozia nepalensis Bakalin & Vadim A.
- Lophozia nivicola R.M.Schust.
- Lophozia novae-caesareae (A.Evans) Stephani
- Lophozia obtusa (Lindb.) A.Evans
- Lophozia opacula Stephani
- Lophozia pacifica Bakalin
- Lophozia pallida (Steph.) Grolle
- Lophozia perssonii H.Buch & S.W.Arnell
- Lophozia pilifera Horik.
- Lophozia rotundifolia Horik.
- Lophozia savicziae Schljakov
- Lophozia schusterana Schljakov
- Lophozia schusteriana Schljakov
- Lophozia serpens (Dumort.) Dumort.
- Lophozia setosa (Mitt.) Stephani
- Lophozia silvicola H.Buch
- Lophozia silvicoloides N.Kitag.
- Lophozia stolonifera R.M.Schust.
- Lophozia subalpina (R.M.Schust.) R.M.Schust.
- Lophozia subapiculata R.M.Schust. & Damsh.
- Lophozia subdichotoma Spruce
- Lophozia subinflata (Spruce) R.M.Schust.
- Lophozia sudetica (Nees ex Huebener) Grolle
- Lophozia tenuicula Spruce
- Lophozia tristaniana (S.W.Arnell) Váňa
- Lophozia udarii S.Srivast., S.C.Srivast. & K.K.Rawat
- Lophozia uncinata Schljakov
- Lophozia undulata Horik.
- Lophozia ventricosa (Dicks.) Dumort.
- Lophozia verruculosa R.M.Schust.
- Lophozia wenzelii (Nees) Steph.
