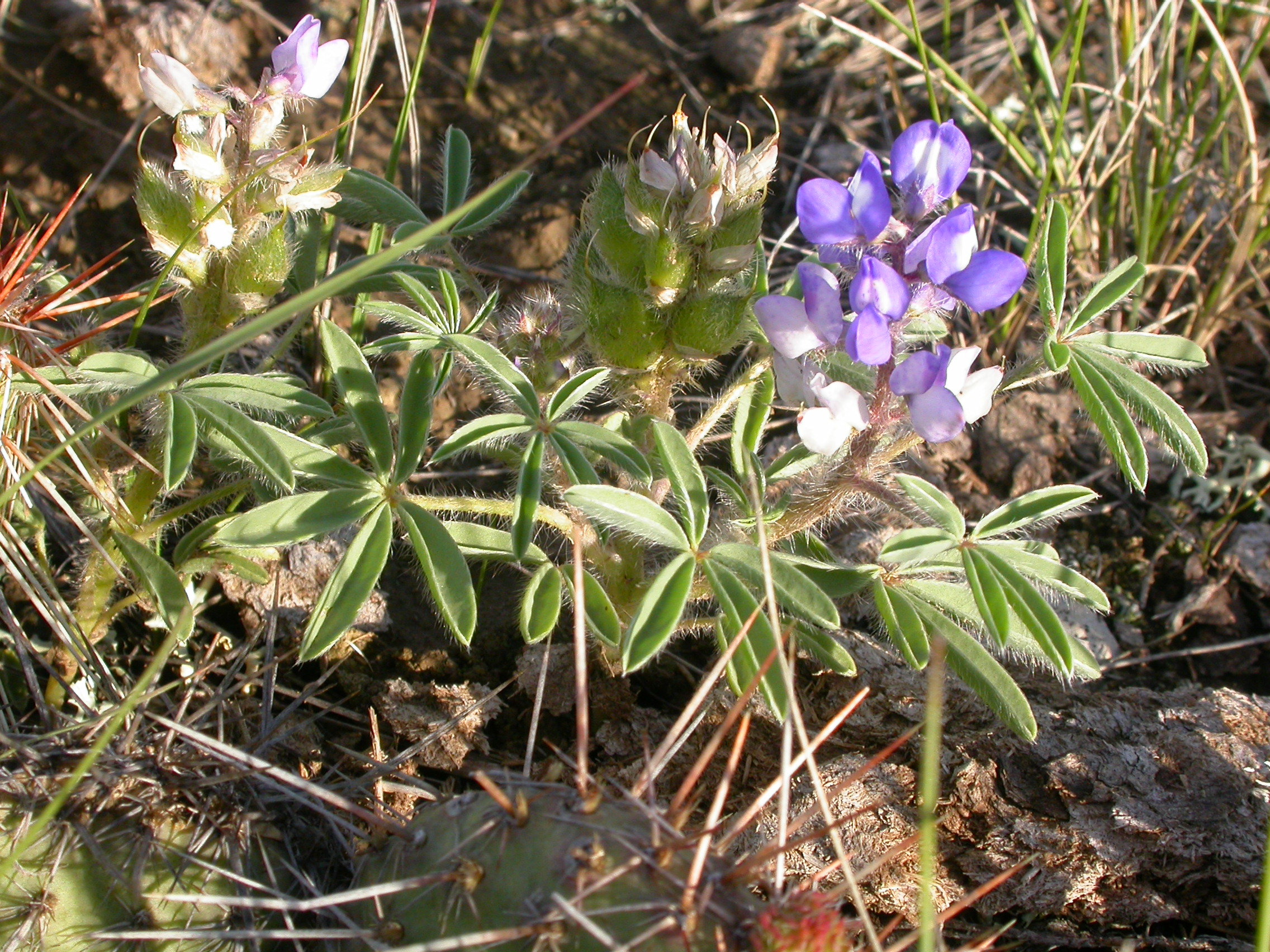
- Lupinus pusillus, Montana

Conservation status
- Secure (NatureServe)

Scientific classification
- Kingdom: Plantae
- Clade: Tracheophytes
- Clade: Angiosperms
- Clade: Eudicots
- Clade: Rosids
- Order: Fabales
- Family: Fabaceae
- Subfamily: Faboideae
- Genus: Lupinus
- Species: L. pusillus

Binomial name
- Lupinus pusillus Pursh

= Lupinus pusillus =

Plant species in the pea family

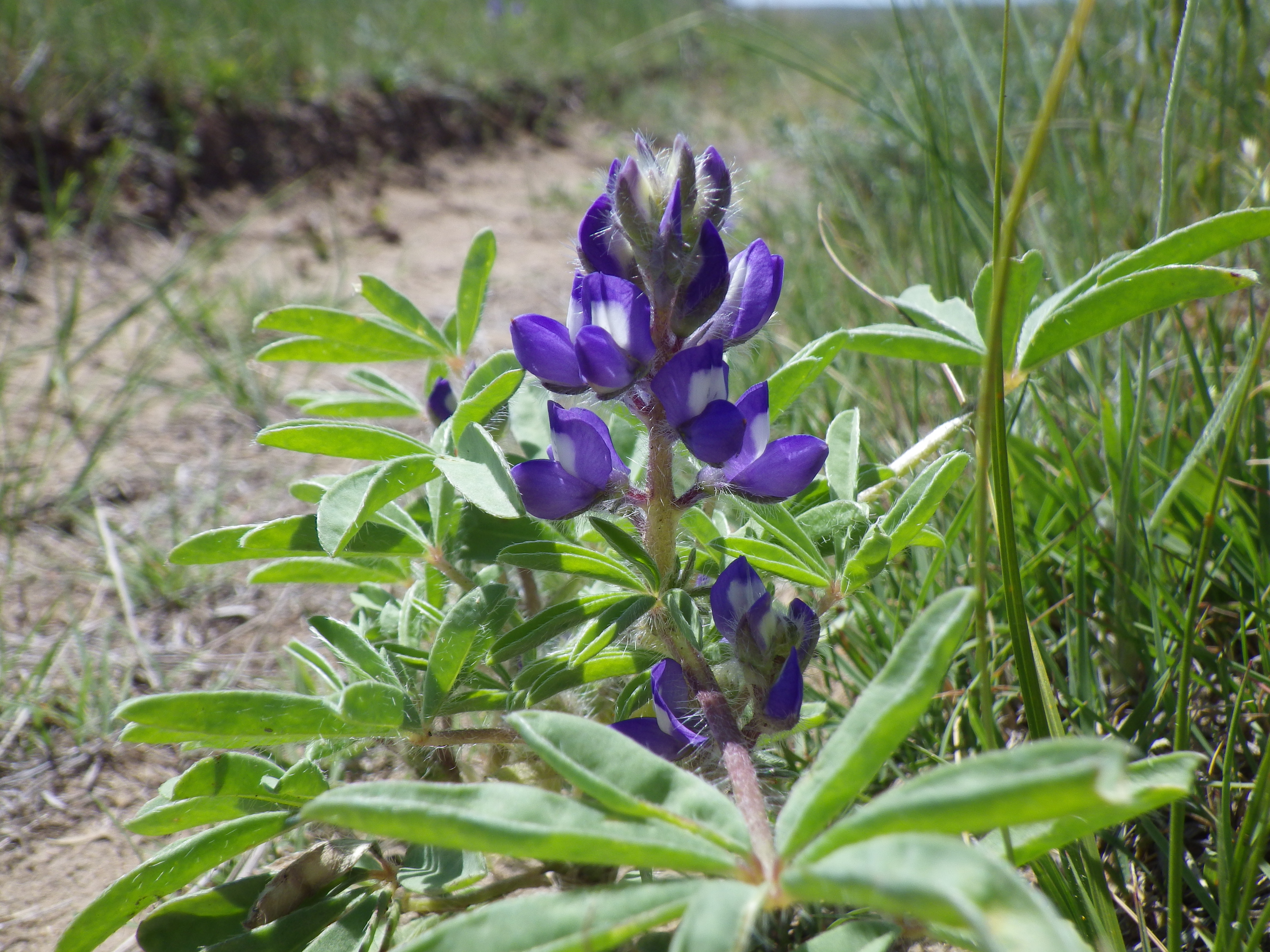
Lupinus pusillus in the Wyoming big sagebrush steppe biome, near Phillips, Montana.

Lupinus pusillus, the rusty lupine or dwarf lupine, is an annual plant in the legume family (fabaceae) found in the Colorado Plateau and Canyonlands region of the southwestern United States(California), and north to Montana.

== Description ==
=== Growth pattern ===
It is an annual plant growing up to 9 inches (23 cm) tall. Pusillus is for the small size of the plant.

=== Leaves and stems ===
Leaves are compound palmate with 3-9 1/2 to 1 1/2 inches (1.3 to 3.8 cm) long inversely lance- shaped leaflets.

Plant stems and leaf stems (petioles) have long spreading hairs.

=== Inflorescence and fruit ===
It blooms from April to June.

Flowers are in stalks of 4-38 and bluish to purple or bicolored, with a yellow spot on the upper petal.

Seedpods are nearly oval and have constrictions separating the seeds.

== Habitat and range ==
It can be found in desert shrubland and pinyon juniper woodland communities, from as far north as Washington, to California, and throughout the southwest.

When growing in reddish sand, the blue flowers make a striking contrast with the sun at a low angle.

== Ecological and human interactions ==
It is pollinated by bees.
