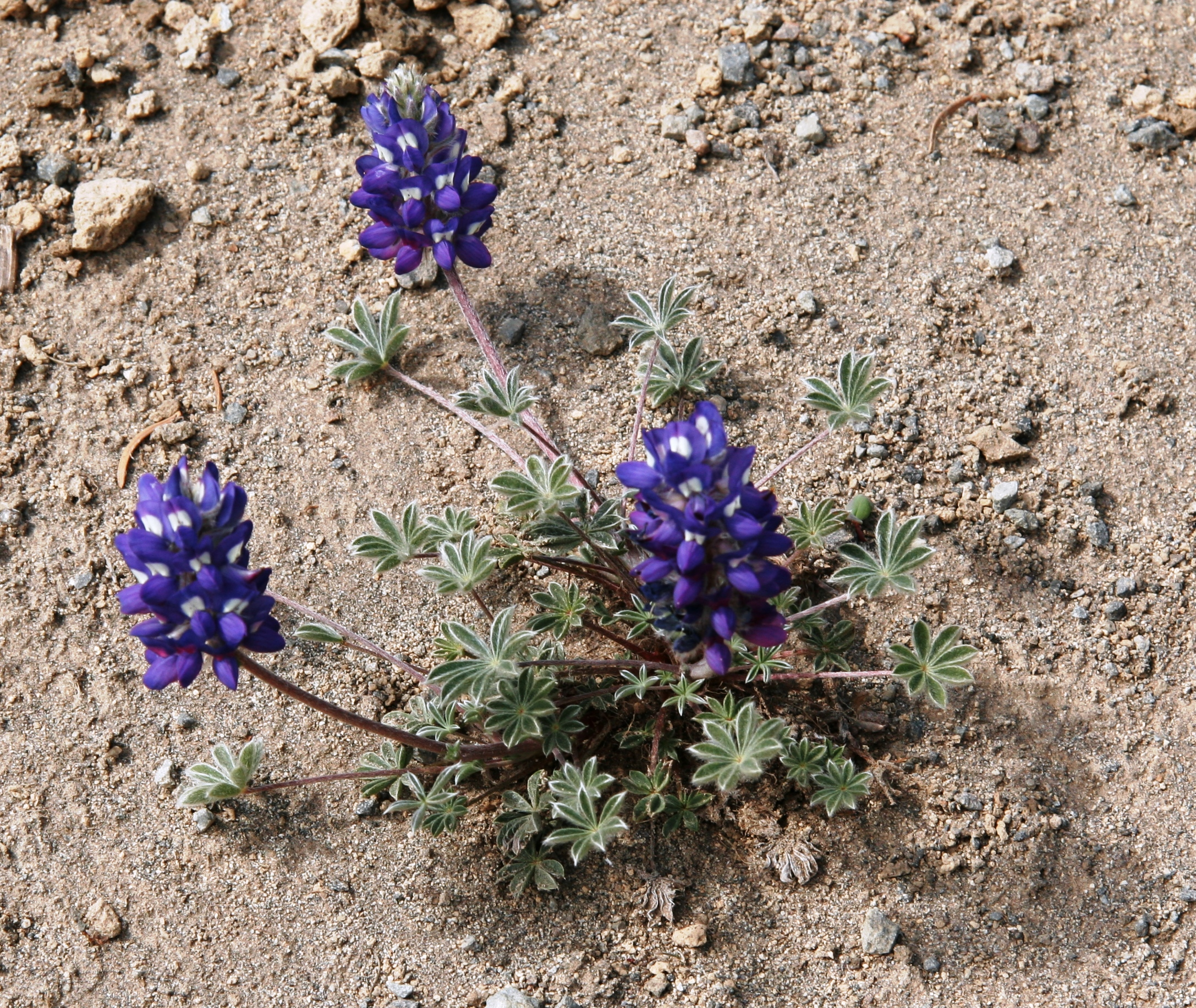
- Dwarf Lupine at Frozen Lake

Scientific classification
- Kingdom: Plantae
- Clade: Tracheophytes
- Clade: Angiosperms
- Clade: Eudicots
- Clade: Rosids
- Order: Fabales
- Family: Fabaceae
- Subfamily: Faboideae
- Genus: Lupinus
- Species: L. lyallii

Binomial name
- Lupinus lyallii S. Watson

= Lupinus lyallii =

Species of legume

Lupinus lyallii, common names of which are dwarf mountain lupine, Lobb's lupine, and Lobb's tidy lupine, is a species of flowering plant from the order of Lamiales native to North America.

== Distribution ==
It can be found in California and elsewhere in western North America.
