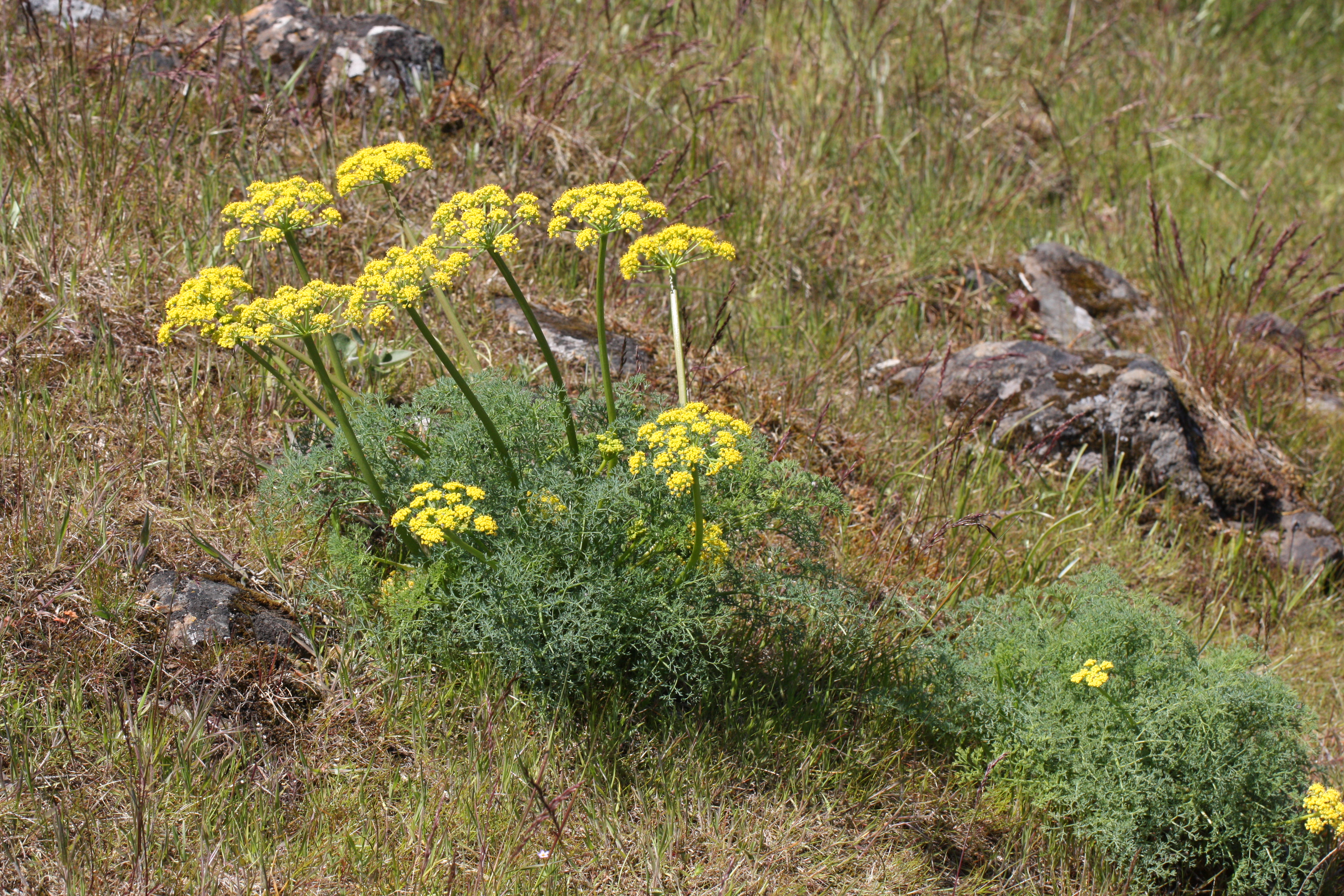

Conservation status
- Secure (NatureServe)

Scientific classification
- Kingdom: Plantae
- Clade: Tracheophytes
- Clade: Angiosperms
- Clade: Eudicots
- Clade: Asterids
- Order: Apiales
- Family: Apiaceae
- Genus: Lomatium
- Species: L. grayi

Binomial name
- Lomatium grayi (J.M.Coult. & Rose) J.M.Coult. & Rose

= Lomatium grayi =

Species of flowering plant

Lomatium grayi, commonly known as Gray's biscuitroot, Gray's desert parsley, or pungent desert parsley, is a perennial herb of the family Apiaceae. It is native to Western Canada in British Columbia, and the Western United States, including from the Eastern Cascades and northeastern California to the Rocky Mountains.

It is a perennial herb found growing in dry rocky banks and slopes. It grows throughout the sagebrush steppe and also in pinyon–juniper woodland. It has a lifespan of 5–7 years.

== Description ==
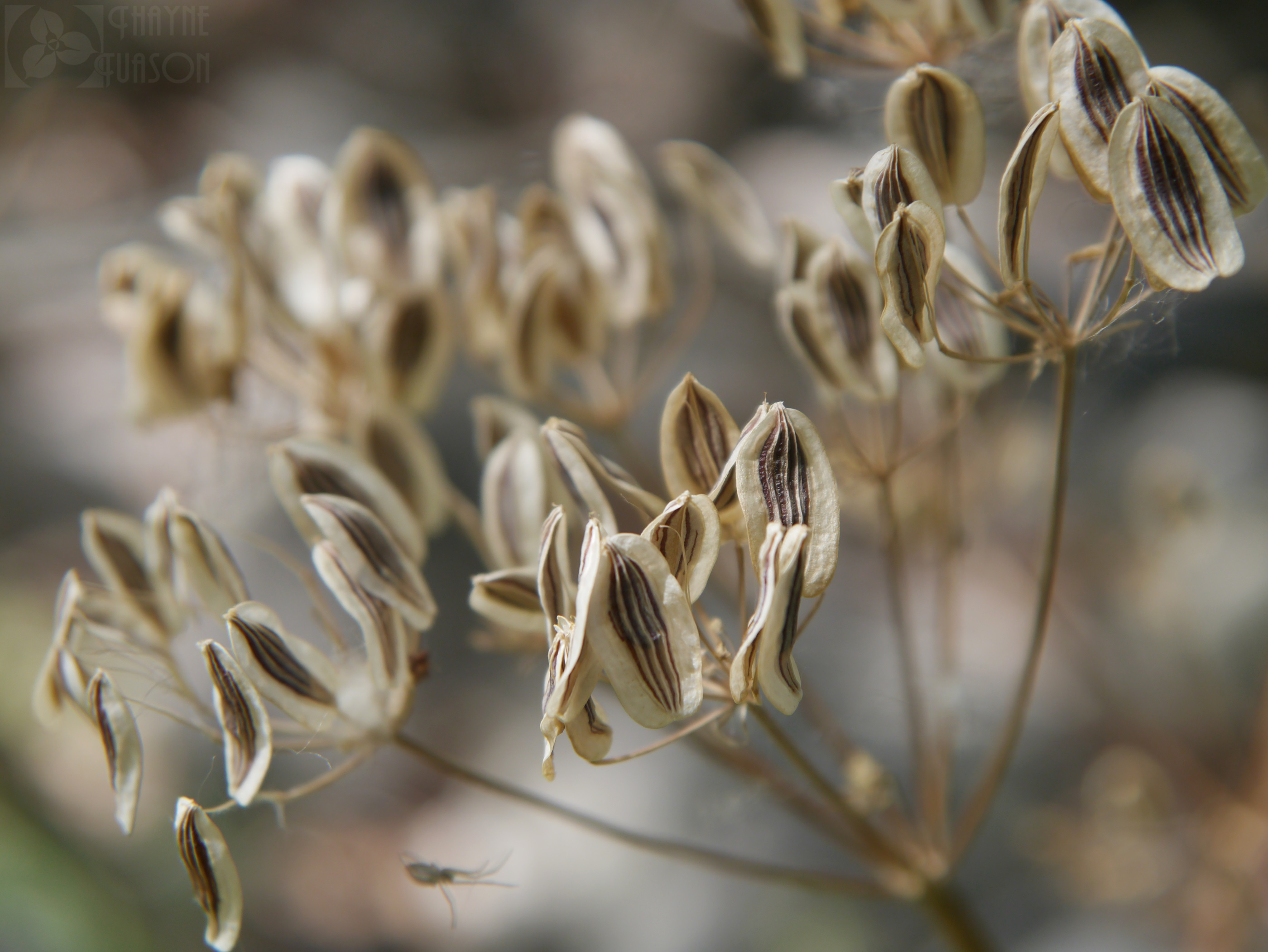
Mature seeds of Lomatium grayi

Lomatium grayi has glabrous stems that split at the ground, and a long, thick taproot. The dark-green leaves are numerously divided. It flowers from March to July with 1–20 compound umbels, each with hundreds of yellow flowers, upon leafless stalks. The fruit is glabrous, elliptic, 8–15 mm long, with the lateral wings about half as wide as the body. The plant has a strong odor resembling parsley.

Varieties

- Lomatium grayi var. depauperatum (M.E. Jones) Mathias; endemic to northeastern Nevada and northwestern Utah.
- Lomatium grayi var. grayi

== Taxonomy ==
A 2018 study has proposed splitting L. grayi into four species, based on morphometric analysis: Lomatium klickitatense in Klickitat County, Washington and surrounding areas; Lomatium papilioniferum in the rest of the Pacific Northwest; Lomatium depauperatum (formerly L. grayi var. depauperatum) in western Utah and eastern Nevada; and Lomatium grayi s.s. in the western Rocky Mountains and adjoining basins.

== Uses ==
The plant was used as a food source by the Northern Paiute people in Oregon; new tender stems were eaten raw, and the roots were a winter starvation food.
