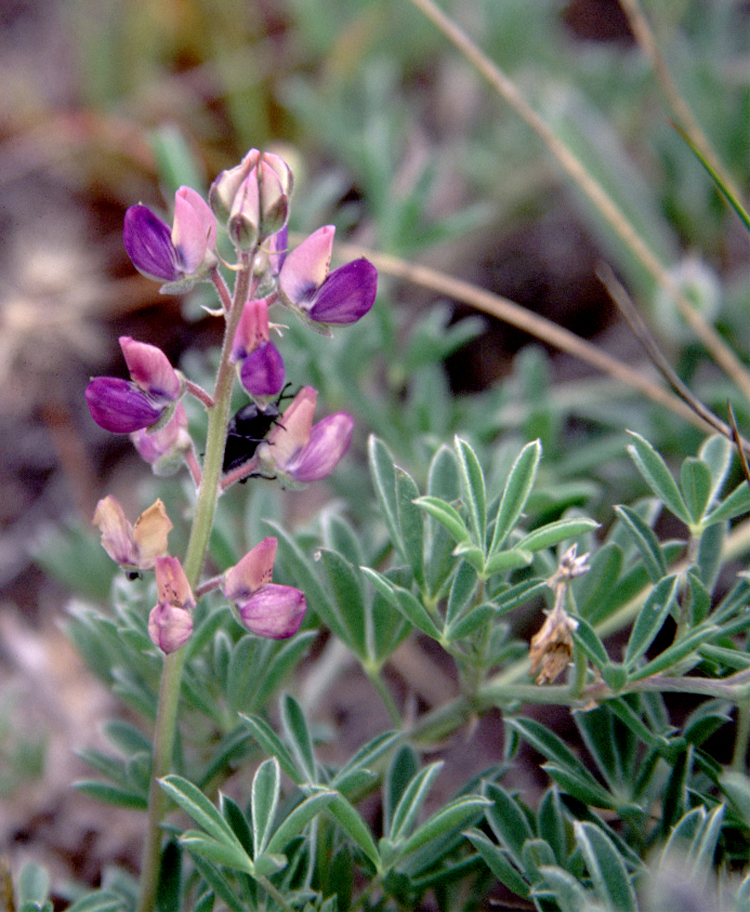

Scientific classification
- Kingdom: Plantae
- Clade: Tracheophytes
- Clade: Angiosperms
- Clade: Eudicots
- Clade: Rosids
- Order: Fabales
- Family: Fabaceae
- Subfamily: Faboideae
- Genus: Lupinus
- Species: L. littoralis

Binomial name
- Lupinus littoralis Dougl.

= Lupinus littoralis =

Species of legume

Lupinus littoralis is a species of lupine known by the common name seashore lupine. It is native to the coastline of western North America from British Columbia to northern California, where it grows in sandy habitat.

It is a low perennial herb or subshrub growing in a clump or mat no more than 30 centimetres (12 in) tall. Each palmate leaf is divided into 5 to 9 leaflets up to 3.5 centimetres (1.4 in) long. The herbage is coated in long, shaggy whitish or silvery hairs. The inflorescence is raceme of whorled flowers each around a centimeter long. The flower is purple in color with a white patch on its banner that fades pinkish. The fruit is a hairy legume pod 3 or 4 centimeters long containing up to 12 seeds. The bloom period is between the months of May to August. It is found between the elevations of 0 to 1245 feet (0 to 380 meters). It is a host to the local butterfly species Glaucopsyche piasus, the Arrowhead Blue.

Some Native American tribes ate the roots.
