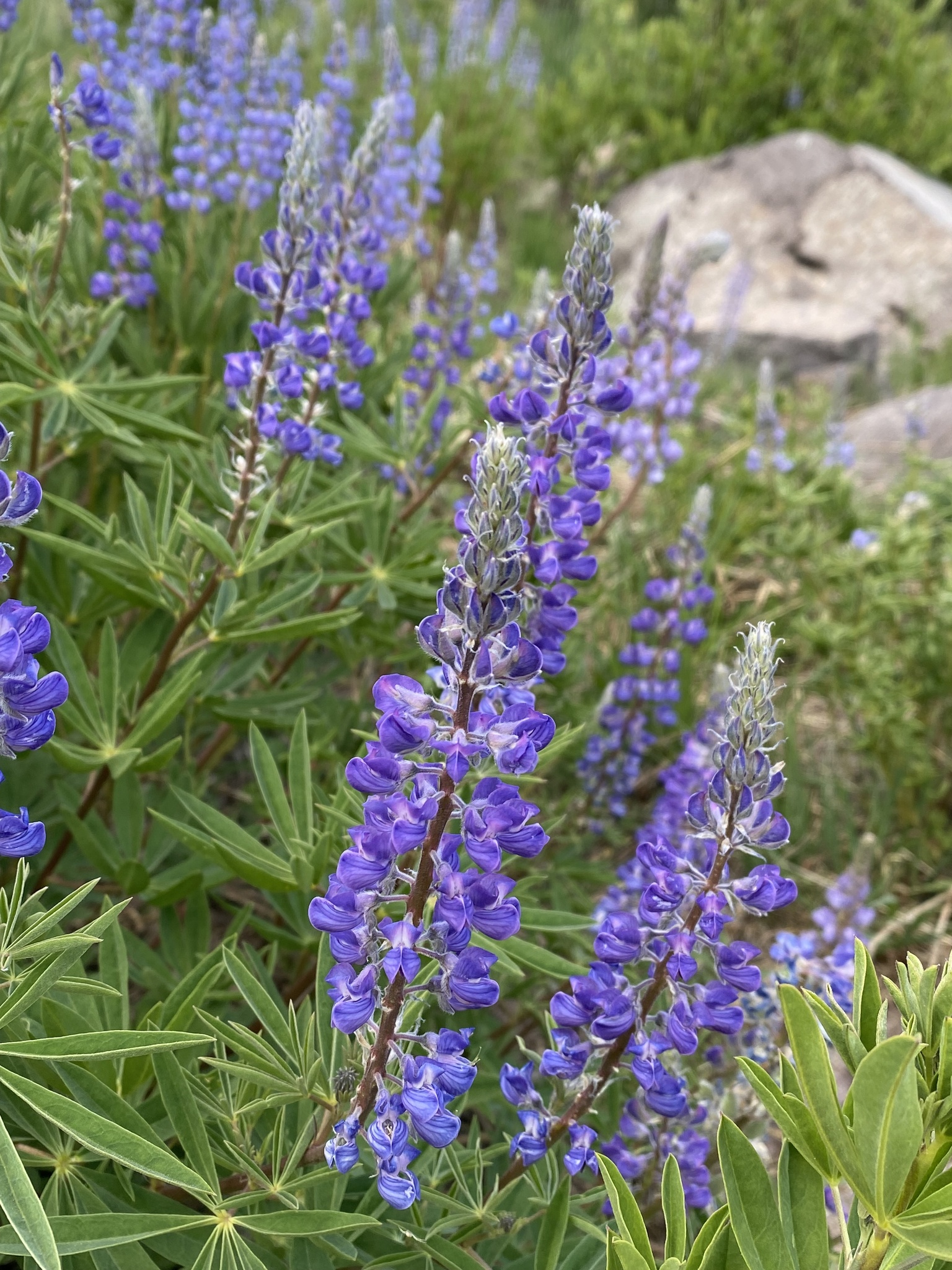
- In Iron County, Utah

Conservation status
- Secure (NatureServe)

Scientific classification
- Kingdom: Plantae
- Clade: Embryophytes
- Clade: Tracheophytes
- Clade: Spermatophytes
- Clade: Angiosperms
- Clade: Eudicots
- Clade: Rosids
- Order: Fabales
- Family: Fabaceae
- Subfamily: Faboideae
- Genus: Lupinus
- Species: L. argenteus

Binomial name
- Lupinus argenteus Pursh

Subspecies and varieties
- List: L. a. subsp. argenteus; L. a. var. fulvomaculatus; L. a. var. laxiflorus; L. a. var. moabensis; L. a. var. myrianthus; L. a. var. palmeri; L. a. var. parviflorus; L. a. var. rubricaulis; L. a. subsp. spathulatus

= Lupinus argenteus =

Plant species in the pea family

Lupinus argenteus is a species of lupine known by the common name silvery lupine. It is native to much of western North America from the southwestern Canadian provinces to northernmost Mexico and as far east as the Great Plains. It grows in several types of habitats, including sagebrush, grassland, and forests.

== Description ==
Lupinus argenteus is a perennial plant with one or more stems that that usually grow 15 to 70 centimeters (0.5 to 2.3 ft) tall, but occasionally can be as short as 10 cm (4 in) or as tall as 1.2 m (3 ft 11 in). The stems branch towards their ends or have short spurs and are green or somewhat purple in color. They are covered with hairs that can be puberulent, fine short and erect, or strigose, straight and all pointing in the same direction. The stems grow from a root-crown at the surface of the soil or shallowly buried.

The leaves can appear green, ashy, or canescent, nearly white in color, due to either being hairless or covered in hairs on their upper surface. Most of the leaves are cauline, attached to the stems of the plants. Each leaf is palmate, made up of leaflets radiating from a central attachment point, with six to nine leaflets for this species and attached by a petiole 1.5–8 cm long.

The flowers are in racemes that can be 4 to 30 centimeters (1.6 to 11.8 in) long, but more usually 5 to 25 cm (2 to 10 in). They are either solitary at the end of stem or one larger one at the end of the stem with smaller racemes branching off below the primary, or several nearly equal in size. The flowers are typically blue-purple, but occasionally are lavender, pink, or white, but with a white or yellow spot on the uppermost banner petal that turns red-purple as the flower ages.

The fruit is a pod that is densely hairy containing two to six seeds and measuring 2–3 cm by 0.6–0.9 cm.

== Taxonomy ==
Lupinus argenteus was scientifically described by Frederick Traugott Pursh in 1813. It is part of the genus Lupinus in the family Fabaceae. He described it using specimens collected by Meriwether Lewis in an area he described as, "On the banks of the Kooskoosky River". This is now named the Clearwater River which forms the present day western Montana border with Idaho.

=== Varieties and subspecies ===
There are two accepted subspecies and seven accepted botanical varieties of Lupinus argenteus. Each of these infraspecifics has one or more accepted synonyms.

- Lupinus argenteus subsp. argenteus
- Lupinus argenteus var. fulvomaculatus (Payson) Barneby
- Lupinus argenteus var. laxiflorus (Douglas ex Lindl.) Dorn
- Lupinus argenteus var. moabensis S.L.Welsh
- Lupinus argenteus var. myrianthus (Greene) Isely
- Lupinus argenteus var. palmeri (S.Watson) Barneby
- Lupinus argenteus var. parviflorus (Nutt. ex Hook. & Arn.) C.L.Hitchc.
- Lupinus argenteus var. rubricaulis (Greene) S.L.Welsh
- Lupinus argenteus subsp. spathulatus (Rydb.) L.W.Hess & D.B.Dunn

Table of Synonyms
Name	Year	Rank	Synonym of:	Notes
Lupinus abiesicola C.P.Sm.	1944	species	subsp. argenteus	= het.
Lupinus acclivatatis C.P.Sm.	1944	species	subsp. argenteus	= het.
Lupinus achilleaphilus C.P.Sm.	1952	species	subsp. argenteus	= het.
Lupinus adscendens Rydb.	1903	species	var. parviflorus	= het.
Lupinus alexanderae C.P.Sm.	1944	species	subsp. argenteus	= het.
Lupinus alicanescens C.P.Sm.	1952	species	subsp. argenteus	= het.
Lupinus aliumbellatus C.P.Sm.	1952	species	subsp. argenteus	= het.
Lupinus allimicranthus C.P.Sm.	1942	species	var. parviflorus	= het.
Lupinus alpestris A.Nelson	1899	species	var. parviflorus	= het.
Lupinus alpestris var. argentatus (Rydb.) C.P.Sm.	1940	variety	subsp. argenteus	= het.
Lupinus alsophilus Greene	1900	species	subsp. argenteus	= het.
Lupinus alturasensis C.P.Sm.	1942	species	subsp. argenteus	= het.
Lupinus annieae C.P.Sm.	1944	species	subsp. argenteus	= het.
Lupinus argenteus f. albiflorus B.Boivin	1960	form	subsp. argenteus	= het.
Lupinus argenteus subsp. ingratus (Greene) Harmon	1972	subspecies	var. fulvomaculatus	= het.
Lupinus argenteus subsp. moabensis D.B.Dunn & Harmon ex S.L.Welsh	1978	subspecies	var. moabensis	= het., pro syn.
Lupinus argenteus subsp. parviflorus (Nutt. ex Hook. & Arn.) L.Ll.Phillips	1955	subspecies	var. parviflorus	≡ hom.
Lupinus argenteus subsp. rubricaulis (Greene) L.W.Hess & D.B.Dunn	1970	subspecies	var. parviflorus	≡ hom.
Lupinus argenteus var. argentatus (Rydb.) Barneby	1989	variety	subsp. argenteus	= het.
Lupinus argenteus var. aristatovatus C.P.Sm.	1940	variety	subsp. argenteus	= het.
Lupinus argenteus var. boreus (C.P.Sm.) S.L.Welsh	1978	variety	subsp. argenteus	= het.
Lupinus argenteus var. decumbens (Torr.) S.Watson	1873	variety	subsp. argenteus	= het.
Lupinus argenteus var. sericeus Cockerell	1888	variety	subsp. argenteus	= het.
Lupinus argenteus var. stenophyllus (Rydb.) Davis	1952	variety	subsp. argenteus	= het.
Lupinus argenteus var. tenellus (Douglas ex G.Don) D.B.Dunn	1955	variety	var. laxiflorus	= het.
Lupinus blankinshipii A.Heller	1908	species	var. parviflorus	= het.
Lupinus calcicola C.P.Sm.	1944	species	subsp. argenteus	= het.
Lupinus candidissimus Eastw.	1941	species	var. palmeri	= het.
Lupinus capitis-amniculi C.P.Sm.	1946	species	subsp. argenteus	= het.
Lupinus cariciformis C.P.Sm.	1946	species	subsp. argenteus	= het.
Lupinus caudatus var. rubricaulis (Greene) C.P.Sm.	1927	variety	var. parviflorus	≡ hom.
Lupinus charlestonensis C.P.Sm.	1944	species	subsp. argenteus	= het.
Lupinus christianus C.P.Sm.	1946	species	subsp. argenteus	= het.
Lupinus clarkensis C.P.Sm.	1944	species	subsp. argenteus	= het.
Lupinus clokeyanus C.P.Sm.	1944	species	var. palmeri	= het.
Lupinus corymbosus A.Heller	1905	species	subsp. argenteus	= het.
Lupinus davisianus C.P.Sm.	1942	species	subsp. argenteus	= het.
Lupinus decumbens Torr.	1827	species	subsp. argenteus	= het.
Lupinus decumbens var. argentatus Rydb.	1906	variety	subsp. argenteus	= het.
Lupinus edward-palmeri C.P.Sm.	1946	species	subsp. argenteus	= het.
Lupinus equi-coeli C.P.Sm.	1946	species	subsp. argenteus	= het.
Lupinus flavopinuum C.P.Sm.	1944	species	subsp. argenteus	= het.
Lupinus floribundus Greene	1892	species	var. myrianthus	= het.
Lupinus foliosus Hook.	1847	species	var. laxiflorus	= het., nom. illeg.
Lupinus fontis-batchelderi C.P.Sm.	1945	species	var. palmeri	= het.
Lupinus fremontensis C.P.Sm.	1942	species	subsp. argenteus	= het.
Lupinus fulvomaculatus Payson	1915	species	var. fulvomaculatus	≡ hom.
Lupinus funstonanus C.P.Sm.	1945	species	subsp. argenteus	= het.
Lupinus garrettianus C.P.Sm.	1949	species	subsp. argenteus	= het.
Lupinus hendersonii Eastw.	1940	species	subsp. argenteus	= het.
Lupinus hullianus C.P.Sm.	1946	species	var. laxiflorus	= het.
Lupinus ingratus Greene	1900	species	var. fulvomaculatus	= het.
Lupinus jaegeranus C.P.Sm.	1945	species	var. palmeri	= het.
Lupinus jonesii Blank.	1905	species	var. parviflorus	= het., nom. illeg.
Lupinus junipericola C.P.Sm.	1944	species	var. palmeri	= het.
Lupinus keckianus C.P.Sm.	1945	species	var. parviflorus	= het.
Lupinus lanatocarinus C.P.Sm.	1942	species	subsp. argenteus	= het.
Lupinus lariversianus C.P.Sm.	1944	species	subsp. argenteus	= het.
Lupinus laxiflorus Douglas ex Lindl.	1828	species	var. laxiflorus	≡ hom.
Lupinus laxiflorus Hook.	1847	species	subsp. argenteus	= het., nom. illeg.
Lupinus laxiflorus var. corymbosus (A.Heller) Jeps.	1936	variety	subsp. argenteus	= het.
Lupinus laxiflorus var. foliosus Torr. & A.Gray	1840	variety	subsp. argenteus	= het.
Lupinus laxiflorus var. tenellus (Douglas ex G.Don) Torr. & A.Gray	1840	variety	var. laxiflorus	= het.
Lupinus laxus Rydb.	1903	species	var. parviflorus	= het.
Lupinus leptostachyus Greene	1901	species	var. myrianthus	= het.
Lupinus lucidulus Rydb.	1902	species	subsp. argenteus	= het.
Lupinus merrillanus C.P.Sm.	1946	species	subsp. argenteus	= het.
Lupinus mexicanus A.Gray	1853	species	subsp. argenteus	= het., nom. illeg.
Lupinus montis-cookii C.P.Sm.	1952	species	var. laxiflorus	= het.
Lupinus myrianthus Greene	1900	species	var. myrianthus	≡ hom.
Lupinus olive-brownae C.P.Sm.	1948	species	subsp. argenteus	= het.
Lupinus olive-nortonae C.P.Sm.	1948	species	subsp. argenteus	= het.
Lupinus ornatus Newb.	1858	species	subsp. argenteus	= het., nom. illeg.
Lupinus palmeri S.Watson	1873	species	var. palmeri	≡ hom.
Lupinus palmeri var. clawsonianus C.P.Sm.	1939	variety	var. palmeri	= het.
Lupinus palmeri var. humilis C.P.Sm.	1939	variety	var. palmeri	= het.
Lupinus parviflorus Nutt. ex Hook. & Arn.	1838	species	var. parviflorus	≡ hom.
Lupinus parviflorus subsp. floribundus (Greene) Harmon	1972	subspecies	var. myrianthus	= het.
Lupinus parviflorus subsp. myrianthus (Greene) Harmon	1972	subspecies	var. myrianthus	≡ hom.
Lupinus parviflorus var. complicatus Kuntze	1891	variety	subsp. argenteus	= het.
Lupinus parviflorus var. fulvomaculatus (Payson) Harmon	1972	variety	var. fulvomaculatus	≡ hom.
Lupinus patulipes C.P.Sm.	1944	species	subsp. argenteus	= het.
Lupinus populorum C.P.Sm.	1944	species	subsp. argenteus	= het.
Lupinus portae-westgardiae C.P.Sm.	1945	species	var. palmeri	= het.
Lupinus pulcher Eastw.	1942	species	subsp. argenteus	= het.
Lupinus pulcherrimus Rydb.	1903	species	var. parviflorus	= het.
Lupinus rubricaulis Greene	1901	species	var. parviflorus	≡ hom.
Lupinus seclusus C.P.Sm.	1946	species	var. parviflorus	= het.
Lupinus serradentum C.P.Sm.	1946	species	var. parviflorus	= het.
Lupinus sicco-silvae C.P.Sm.	1944	species	subsp. argenteus	= het.
Lupinus sitgreavesii S.Watson	1873	species	subsp. argenteus	= het.
Lupinus spathulatus Rydb.	1902	species	subsp. argenteus	≡ hom.
Lupinus spathulatus var. boreus C.P.Sm.	1952	variety	subsp. argenteus	= het.
Lupinus standingii C.P.Sm.	1952	species	subsp. argenteus	= het.
Lupinus stenophyllus Rydb.	1907	species	subsp. argenteus	= het.
Lupinus sublanatus Eastw.	1942	species	subsp. argenteus	= het.
Lupinus summae C.P.Sm.	1946	species	subsp. argenteus	= het.
Lupinus tenellus Douglas ex G.Don	1832	species	var. laxiflorus	= het.
Lupinus trainianus C.P.Sm.	1944	species	subsp. argenteus	= het.
Notes: ≡ homotypic synonym; = heterotypic synonym

=== Names ===
The species name, argenteus, means silvery and its common name is silvery lupine.

== Range and habitat ==
Silver lupins grow throughout the western United States, parts of western Canada, and two states in Mexico. In Canada it grows in the provinces of British Columbia, Alberta, and Saskatchewan. In the Pacific Northwest it is native to the eastern portions of Washington and Oregon as well as almost all of Idaho. To the east the species grows throughout the Rocky Mountains in the states of Montana and Wyoming and onto the Northern Great Plains as far as western North Dakota and South Dakota. South of this they are mostly found in the Nebraska panhandle and all but the most eastern portions of Colorado. It may also be native to Kansas, but there is not specific location to the records and it is not listed in the Flora of the Great Plains as occurring in Kansas. In Mexico it grows in the northwest in Chihuahua and Sonora.

It grows in a wide range of plant communities including with ephedra, in grasslands, sagebrush steppes, piñon–juniper woodlands, ponderosa pine forests, aspen groves, and even with spruce-fir communities.

== Ecology ==
Many butterflies use silvery lupins as a food plant while caterpillars including the arrowhead blue (Glaucopsyche piasus), gray hairstreak (Strymon melinus), lupine blue (Icaricia icarioides), and silvery blue (Glaucopsyche lygdamus). It is an alternate food plant for the caterpillars of the hops azure butterfly (Celastrina humulus).
