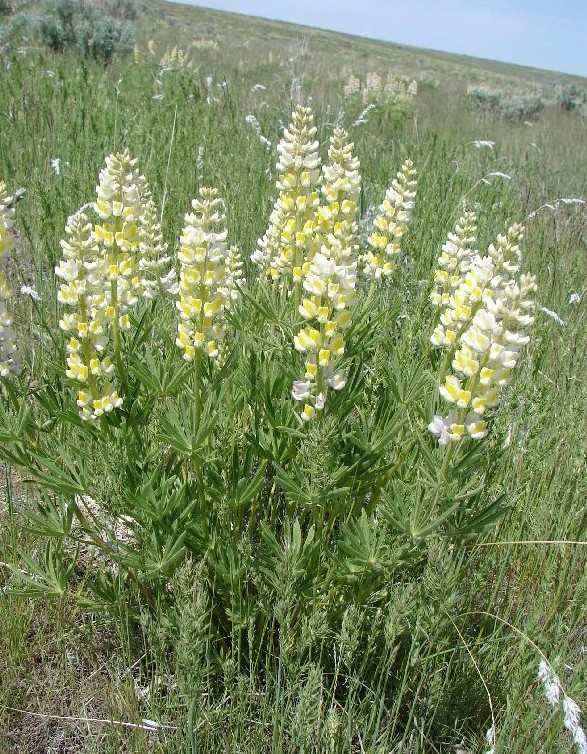

Scientific classification
- Kingdom: Plantae
- Clade: Tracheophytes
- Clade: Angiosperms
- Clade: Eudicots
- Clade: Rosids
- Order: Fabales
- Family: Fabaceae
- Subfamily: Faboideae
- Genus: Lupinus
- Species: L. arbustus

Binomial name
- Lupinus arbustus Dougl. ex Lindl.

= Lupinus arbustus =

Species of legume

Lupinus arbustus is a species of lupine known by the common name longspur lupine. It is native to western North America from British Columbia to California to Utah, where it grows in several types of habitat, including sagebrush and forests. This is a perennial herb growing erect to a maximum of 70 centimetres (28 inches) tall. It is sometimes hairy in texture. Each palmate leaf is made up of 7 to 13 leaflets each up to 7 centimetres (2 3/4 inches) long. The inflorescence is up to 18 centimetres (7 inches) long, bearing whorls of flowers each up to 1.4 centimetres (7/12 inch) long. The calyx of sepals around the base of the corolla has a knoblike spur at the back. The flower corolla is white to yellow to various shades of purple or pink. The fruit is a hairy legume pod 2 or 3 centimetres (3/4 or 1 1/6 inches) long. There are several subspecies.
