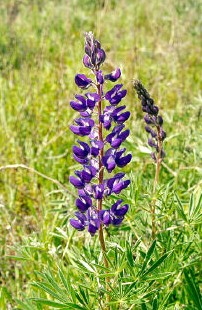

Conservation status
- Secure (NatureServe)

Scientific classification
- Kingdom: Plantae
- Clade: Tracheophytes
- Clade: Angiosperms
- Clade: Eudicots
- Clade: Rosids
- Order: Fabales
- Family: Fabaceae
- Subfamily: Faboideae
- Genus: Lupinus
- Species: L. sericeus

Binomial name
- Lupinus sericeus Pursh

= Lupinus sericeus =

Plant species in the pea family

Lupinus sericeus is a species of flowering plant in the legume family known by the common name silky lupine or Pursh's silky lupine. It is native to western North America from British Columbia to Arizona and east to Alberta and Colorado.

This perennial herb produces erect stems from a woody caudex and deep root system. The stems reach up to 50 centimetres (20 inches) tall and may branch or not. They are coated in silvery or reddish hairs. The leaves have up to 9 lance-shaped leaflets each up to 6 centimetres (2.4 inches) in length. They are coated in silk-like hairs. The inflorescence is a raceme of many flowers, usually in shades of purple or blue, but sometimes white or yellowish. The back side of the banner petal is hairy. The fruit is a hairy legume pod up to 3 centimetres (1.2 in) long containing up to 7 seeds.

This plant grows in many types of habitat, including forests, woodlands, chaparral, shrubsteppe, sagebrush, and grasslands. It often grows on dry, rocky slopes, and does best in open sites without shade. It can be found at low and high elevations, up to 3,000 metres (9,800 ft) or more. It can often be found in recently burned sites. Plants associated with it include Gambel oak (Quercus gambelii), common snowberry (Symphoricarpos albus), ninebark (Physocarpus malvaceus), serviceberry (Amelanchier spp.), mountain-mahogany (Cercocarpus spp.), arrowleaf balsamroot (Balsamorhiza sagittata), western yarrow (Achillea millefolium), heartleaf arnica (Arnica cordifolia), bluebunch wheatgrass (Pseudoroegneria spicata), Sandberg bluegrass (Poa secunda), fescues (Festuca idahoensis and F. scabrella), prairie junegrass (Koeleria cristata), and sedges (Carex spp.).

Like many other lupines, this species is very toxic to sheep, and less so to cattle and horses. It contains teratogenic chemical compounds that may cause birth defects in a calf if the plant is eaten by its mother during the early part of the gestation period. Its toxicity is caused by a concentration of quinolizidine alkaloids. It does not appear to be toxic to wild animals such as white-tailed deer, which often consume it. Bighorn sheep feed on it in Montana and Columbia ground squirrels feed on the leaves and flowers. Many other small mammals and birds also eat parts of it.
