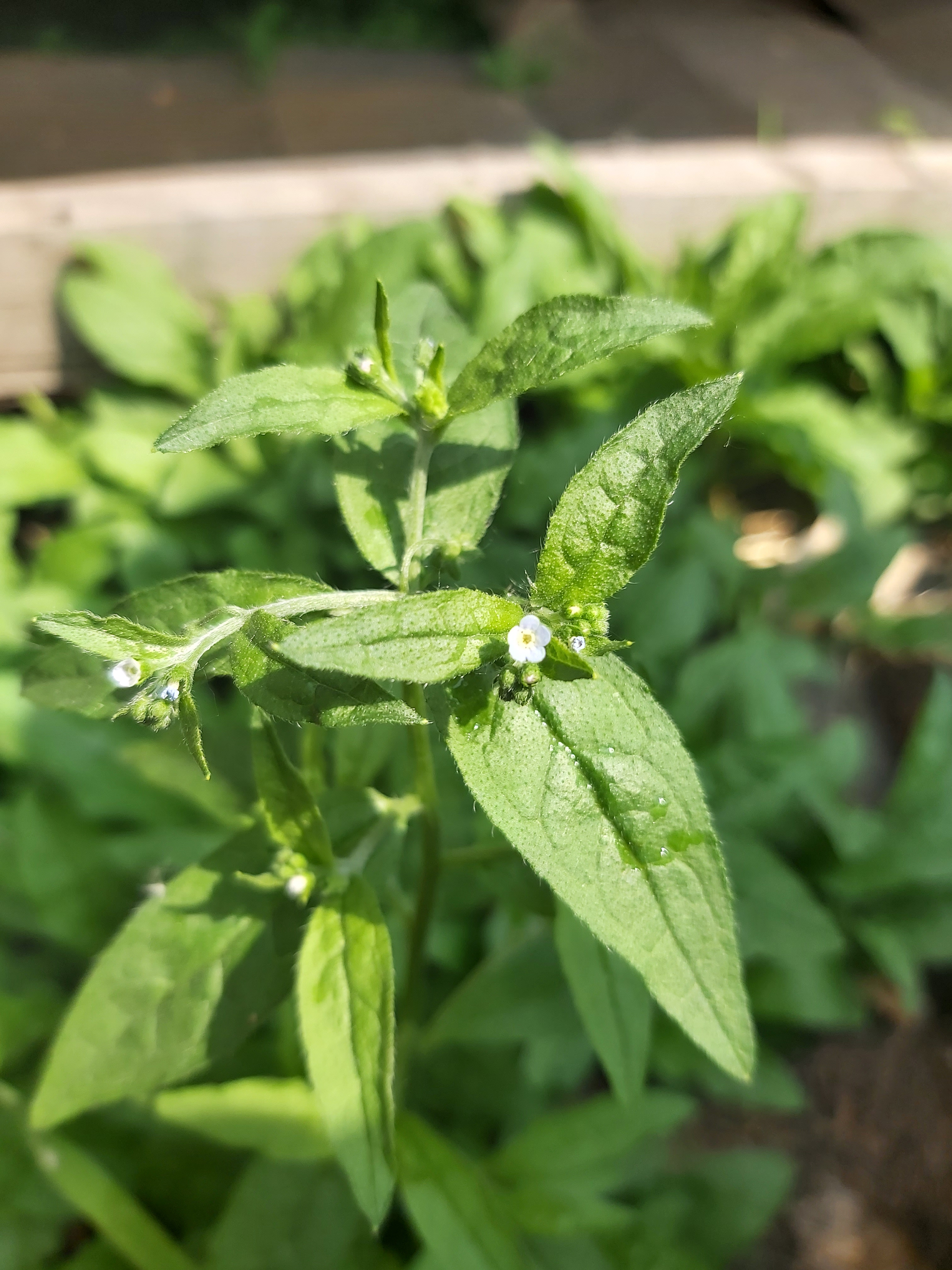

Conservation status
- Secure (NatureServe)

Scientific classification
- Kingdom: Plantae
- Clade: Tracheophytes
- Clade: Angiosperms
- Clade: Eudicots
- Clade: Asterids
- Order: Boraginales
- Family: Boraginaceae
- Genus: Hackelia
- Species: H. deflexa

Binomial name
- Hackelia deflexa (Wahlenb.) Opiz

Varieties
- H. d. var. deflexa; H. d. var. americana (A.Gray) Fernald & I.M.Johnst.

Synonyms
- Cynoglossospermum deflexum (Wahlenb.) Kuntze; Cynoglossum deflexum (Wahlenb.) Roth; Echinospermum deflexum (Wahlenb.) Lehm.; Eritrichium deflexum (Wahlenb.) Y.S.Lian & J.Q.Wang; Lappula deflexa (Wahlenb.) Garcke; Myosotis deflexa Wahlenb.; Rochelia deflexa (Wahlenb.) Roem. & Schult.

= Hackelia deflexa =

Species of plant

Hackelia deflexa is a vascular flowering plant in the borage family known by the common names, Northern stickseed, nodding stickseed, American stickseed, and deflexed bur forget-me-not.

== Taxonomy ==
Hackelia deflexa was first formally described by Göran Wahlenberg as Myosotis deflexa in 1810 before being transferred to the genus Hackelia by Philipp Maximilian Opiz in 1839. Two infraspecific varieties are generally recognized, separated primarily by their native geographic ranges and minor morphological differences:

- Hackelia deflexa var. deflexa – The autonymic (typical) variety, native to Eurasia, including continental Europe, Russia, Korea, and Japan. Its stem leaves are typically slightly broader than those of North American plants, and the dorsal (outer) face of its nutlets is consistently smooth and unarmed inside the prickly rim.
- Hackelia deflexa var. americana (A.Gray) Fernald & I.M.Johnst. – Known commonly as American stickseed, this variety is native to northern North America across Canada and the northern United States. It generally exhibits narrower, lance-elliptic stem leaves; while the dorsal surface of its nutlets is usually smooth and hairless (glabrous), it rarely bears 2 to 12 small prickles.

The taxonomic rank of the North American population has been the subject of ongoing debate among botanists. Asa Gray originally described it in 1882 as Echinospermum deflexum var. americanum, and Merritt Lyndon Fernald and Ivan Murray Johnston formally placed it as a variety under Hackelia deflexa in 1924. While major botanical databases such as Plants of the World Online treat it at the varietal rank (var. americana), other taxonomic authorities and regional floras have elevated it to a subspecies (H. deflexa subsp. americana) or recognized it as a distinct species (Hackelia americana), arguing that its geographic isolation and subtle fruit and leaf differences warrant separate status.

=== Etymology ===
The genus name Hackelia honors the Czech botanist and Catholic priest Josef Hackel (1783–1869), while the specific epithet deflexa is derived from Latin meaning "bent downward," referring to the fruiting stalks (pedicels) that curve downward as the nutlets mature.

== Distribution ==
It is native in many northern locations from much of Canada and the Northern USA as well as in Europe and in Korea and Japan. It has been introduced in Poland. It can be found growing in moist woods and thickets in habitat that is shaded, partially shaded, or sunny.

== Conservation ==
Globally, Hackelia deflexa is ranked as Secure (G5) by NatureServe due to its wide circumboreal distribution. However, populations along the southern and eastern margins of its range are often isolated and threatened by habitat loss. In addition to its vulnerable or critically imperiled status in Alberta, New Brunswick, and Japan, it is listed as endangered or critically imperiled in several eastern and midwestern U.S. states—including Maine, New York, and Illinois—and is presumed extirpated in Ohio.

== Description ==
Hackelia deflexa grows to an average height of 2–3 ft (0.61–0.91 m). Its ovate basil leaves have stalks and rounded tips, while upper leaves grow progressively smaller, and stop developing stalks as they reach increased heights. Leaves can be 5 to 12 cm (2.0 to 4.7 in) long and up to just over 3 cm (1.2 in) wide. They have a rough texture on their upper surface, and are hairy. Stem leaves grow alternately on erect single (generally) stems that are "much branched with short fine hairs throughout", and are "narrowly lance-elliptic, tapered equally at both ends with a pointed or blunt tip".

Hackelia deflexa propagates by seed. It produces light blue to white, and sometimes purplish flowers consisting of 5 petals. Once it has flowered and been pollinated, produces a small nutlet with tiny prickly barbs on it. These barbs allow the nutlet to stick to animal fur and human clothing as it is brushed up against, thus allowing seed to be transported and dispersed as far as the unsuspecting traveller takes it.

=== Similar species ===
Hackelia deflexa can be confused with several related members of the borage family (Boraginaceae) that share small five-petaled flowers and barbed fruits:

- Hackelia virginiana (Virginia stickseed): Overlapping in eastern and central North America, H. virginiana is distinguished by its broader, ovate stem leaves, predominantly white flowers that bloom later in the summer, and nutlets whose dorsal faces are densely covered with 15 to 25 prickles rather than being smooth or sparsely prickly.
- Hackelia floribunda (many-flowered stickseed): Found across western North America, this biennial or perennial species is generally taller and more robust than H. deflexa, producing denser clusters of larger blue flowers (about 4 to 8 mm (1/4 to 1/4 in) wide, compared to 1 to 3 mm (0 to 1/8 in) in H. deflexa) and thriving in moister meadow and riparian habitats.
- Lappula species (stickseeds, such as Lappula squarrosa and Lappula occidentalis): Species in the closely related genus Lappula look very similar in flower and were historically grouped in the same genus. They can be separated by their narrower leaves (which lack visible lateral veins aside from the midrib) and their fruiting stalks (pedicels), which remain erect or ascending rather than drooping downward as in Hackelia.
- Myosotis species (forget-me-nots): In flower, H. deflexa resembles true forget-me-nots—leading to common names such as deflexed bur forget-me-not—but Myosotis species produce smooth, glossy nutlets that completely lack barbed prickles.

== Ecology ==
Hackelia deflexa is an annual or biennial herb that typically flowers from late spring through mid-summer and sets fruit in late summer. Although its specific pollination biology and herbivore interactions have not been formally studied, its small flowers are likely visited by generalist nectar-feeding insects, and high fruiting success in isolated individuals suggests the species is capable of self-pollination. A single mature plant can produce between 1,000 and 2,200 nutlets, which disperse via epizoochory when their barbed marginal prickles catch onto animal fur or human clothing.

Unlike its North American congener Hackelia virginiana, which has documented traditional medicinal uses among the Cherokee, H. deflexa has no recorded ethnobotanical or edible uses. Like other members of the genus Hackelia and the broader borage family (Boraginaceae), it is potentially toxic due to the presence of pyrrolizidine alkaloids, secondary metabolites that serve as a chemical defense against herbivores and can cause liver toxicity if ingested.
