= H. floribunda =

H. floribunda may refer to:

- Habenaria floribunda, a bog orchid
- Hackelia floribunda, a borage native to western North America
- Hasseltia floribunda, a neotropical plant
- Haworthia floribunda, a succulent plant
- Hemizonia floribunda, a tarweed native to North America
- Holarrhena floribunda, a plant used in traditional African medicine
- Hortonia floribunda, a plant endemic to Sri Lanka
