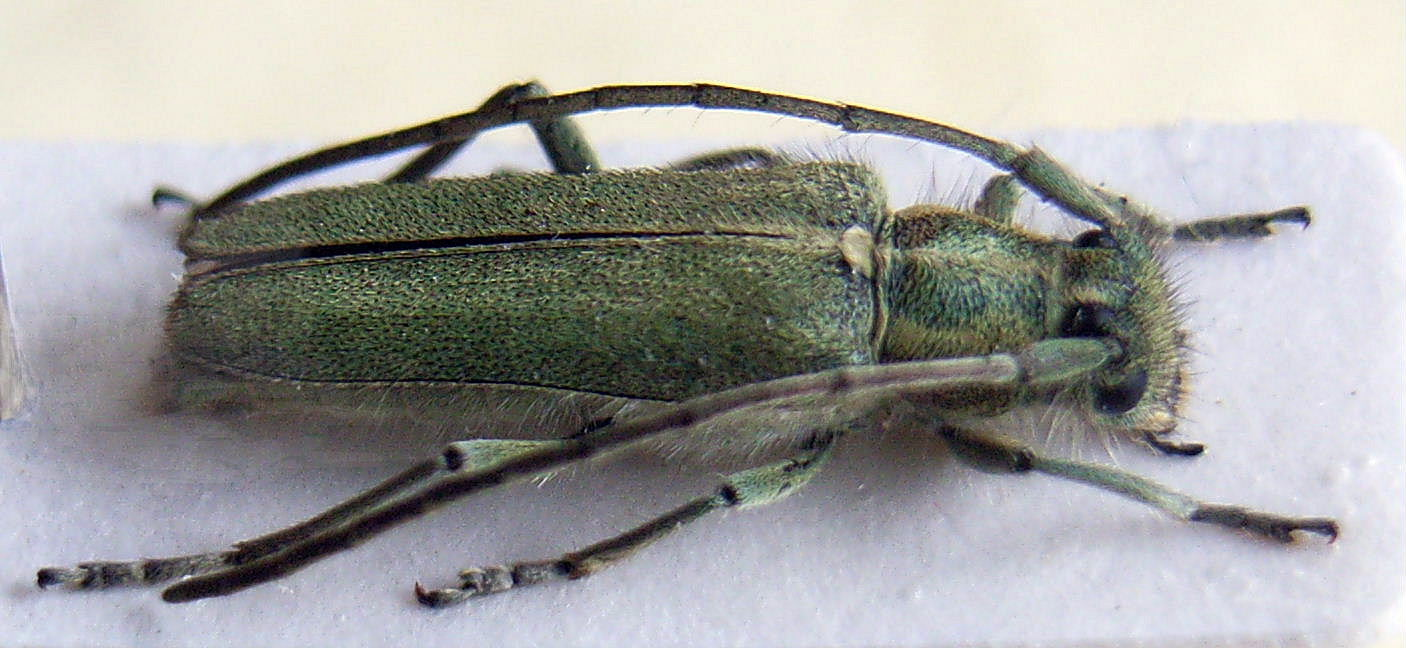

Scientific classification
- Domain: Eukaryota
- Kingdom: Animalia
- Phylum: Arthropoda
- Class: Insecta
- Order: Coleoptera
- Suborder: Polyphaga
- Infraorder: Cucujiformia
- Family: Cerambycidae
- Genus: Phytoecia
- Species: P. caerulescens

Binomial name
- Phytoecia caerulescens (Scopoli, 1763)

Synonyms
- Leptura caerulescens Scopoli, 1763; Leptura viridiuscula Goeze, 1777; Leptura subcoerulea Geoffroy, 1785; Opsilia coerulescens (Scopoli, 1763); Opsilia virescens (Fabricius, 1781); Lamia virescens (Fabricius, 1781); Saperda virescens Fabricius, 1781; Phytoecia coerulescens (Scopoli, 1763); ?Phytoecia tienschanica Fuchs, 1965; Phytoecia virescens (Fabricius, 1781)

= Phytoecia caerulescens =

Species of beetle

Phytoecia caerulescens is a species of beetle in the family Cerambycidae. It was described by Scopoli in 1763, originally under the genus Leptura. It has a wide distribution in Europe, and has been introduced into Australia. It feeds on Echium vulgare, Lappula squarrosa, Anchusa officinalis, Lithospermum officinale, and Cynoglossum officinale.

== Subspecies ==
- Phytoecia caerulescens cretensis Breuning, 1947
- Phytoecia caerulescens caerulescens (Scopoli, 1763)
