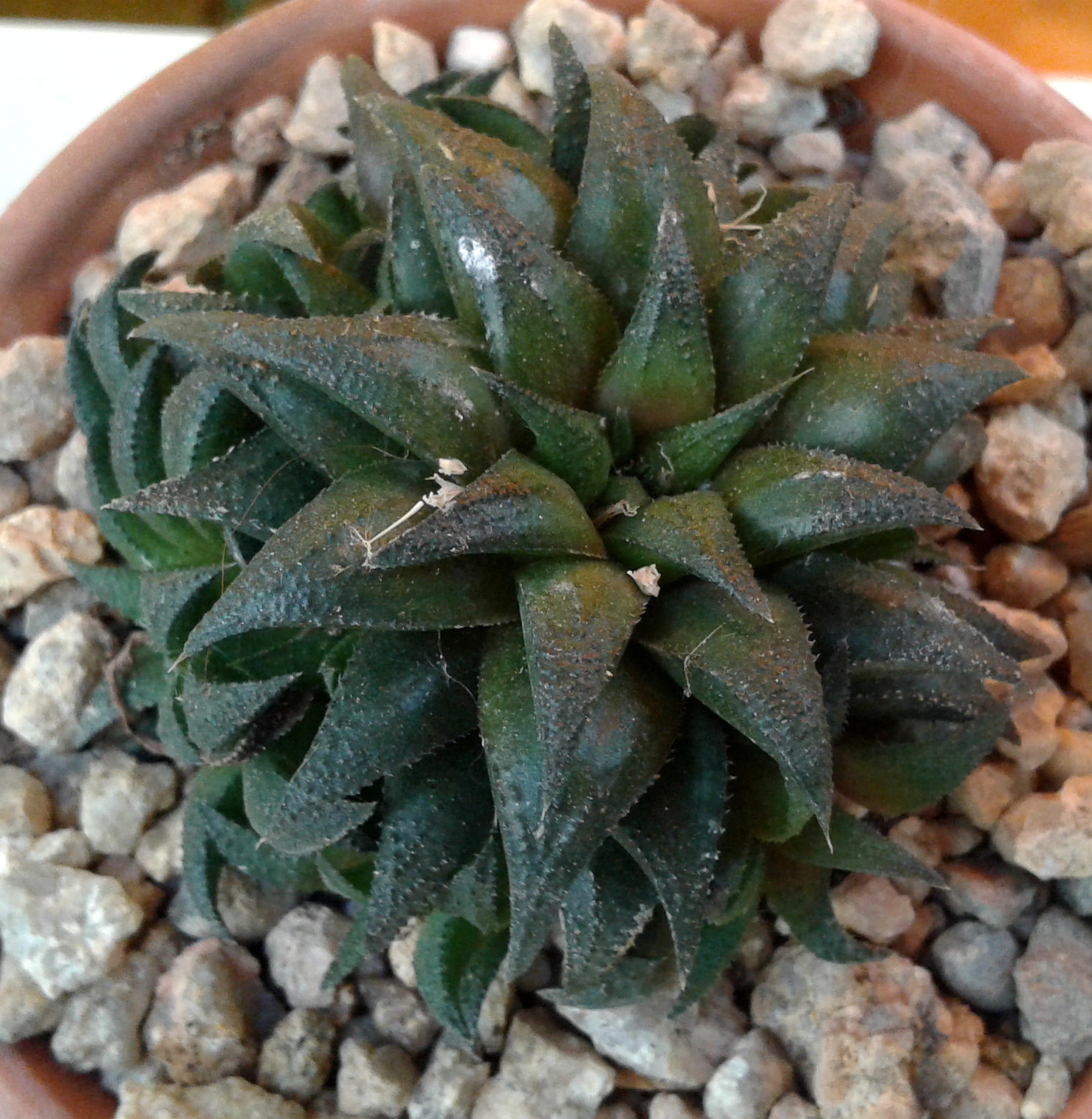

Scientific classification
- Kingdom: Plantae
- Clade: Tracheophytes
- Clade: Angiosperms
- Clade: Monocots
- Order: Asparagales
- Family: Asphodelaceae
- Subfamily: Asphodeloideae
- Genus: Haworthia
- Species: H. parksiana

Binomial name
- Haworthia parksiana Poelln.

= Haworthia parksiana =

Species of flowering plant

Haworthia parksiana is a species of succulent plant native to the Western Cape of South Africa. Regarded as the smallest and one of the rarest types of Haworthia in the wild, it is thought to be most closely related to Haworthia floribunda. It grows in rosettes up to about 4 centimetres (1.6 in) in diameter, and is often hidden in the ground.
