= Hackelia setosa =

Conservation status
- Vulnerable (NatureServe)

Scientific classification
- Kingdom: Plantae
- Clade: Tracheophytes
- Clade: Angiosperms
- Clade: Eudicots
- Clade: Asterids
- Order: Boraginales
- Family: Boraginaceae
- Genus: Hackelia
- Species: H. setosa

Binomial name
- Hackelia setosa (Piper) I.M.Johnst.

Synonyms
- Lappula setosa (Piper)

Species of flowering plant

Hackelia setosa is a species of flowering plant in the borage family known by the common name bristly stickseed. It is native to the Klamath Mountains of northern California and southern Oregon, United States, and it is also known from Sierra Valley to the southeast of that range.

== Description ==
It grows in open and wooded habitat. It is a hairy perennial herb up to about 60 centimeters (24 in) tall. Most of the leaves are located around the base of the plant, reaching up to 22 centimeters (8.7 in) long. Leaves higher on the stem are shorter and narrower. The hairy inflorescence is an open array of branches, each a coiling panicle of white-throated blue flowers. The fruit is a cluster of prickly nutlets. It blooms between the months of June and July. It has a stiff pubescence. There are usually 1 to 3 stems, and rarely more stems. The stems are either strigose or densely sericeous. The basal leaves tips are sharply acute. The cauline leaves tips are either acute or acuminate. The total number of chromosomes in diploid cells in H. setosa is 48. It can be distinguished from H. diffusa by H. setosa's cauline leaves, which tend to be smaller and have more hair than H. diffusa's cauline leaves.
