= Hackelia amethystina =

Scientific classification
- Kingdom: Plantae
- Clade: Tracheophytes
- Clade: Angiosperms
- Clade: Eudicots
- Clade: Asterids
- Order: Boraginales
- Family: Boraginaceae
- Genus: Hackelia
- Species: H. amethystina

Binomial name
- Hackelia amethystina J.T.Howell

Species of flowering plant

Hackelia amethystina is a species of flowering plant in the borage family known by its common name, amethyst stickseed.

== Distribution ==
The plant is endemic to northern California.

It is found in meadows and openings of Yellow pine forest habitats from 1,370–2,200 meters (4,490–7,220 ft) in elevation, in the Northern California Coast Ranges and in the northern Sierra Nevada primarily within Plumas County. In the Sierra, it is often mistaken in flower for Hackelia nervosa.

== Description ==
Hackelia amethystina is a densely hairy perennial herb 40 to 80 centimeters 40 to 80 centimeters (16 to 31 in) tall. The leaves around the base of the stem may be up to 30 centimeters (12 in) long and there are generally several smaller leaves along the stem.

The inflorescence is an array of coils of flowers. Each flower is just over a centimeter wide with blue to pinkish lobes with white appendages at the bases. The fruit is a cluster of prickly nutlets.
