= Hackelia bella =

Scientific classification
- Kingdom: Plantae
- Clade: Tracheophytes
- Clade: Angiosperms
- Clade: Eudicots
- Clade: Asterids
- Order: Boraginales
- Family: Boraginaceae
- Genus: Hackelia
- Species: H. bella

Binomial name
- Hackelia bella (J.F.Macbr.) I.M.Johnst.

Species of flowering plant

Hackelia bella is a species of flowering plant in the borage family known by the common name greater showy stickseed.

It is native to the northern California Coast Ranges and the Klamath Mountains in northeastern California and southwestern Oregon in the United States. It is found in yellow pine forest, red fir forest habitats.

== Description ==
Hackelia bella is a sprawling perennial herb that grows hairy stems to about half a meter in height. Many long, thin oval-shaped leaves surround the base of the plant, up to about 26 centimeters (10 in) long each. Leaves higher up the stem are similar, but shorter and the tops of the stems have few leaves.

The small flowers have five lobes with a small petallike appendage at the base of each lobe. The flowers are usually white. The fruit is a nutlet 5 or 6 millimeters wide.
