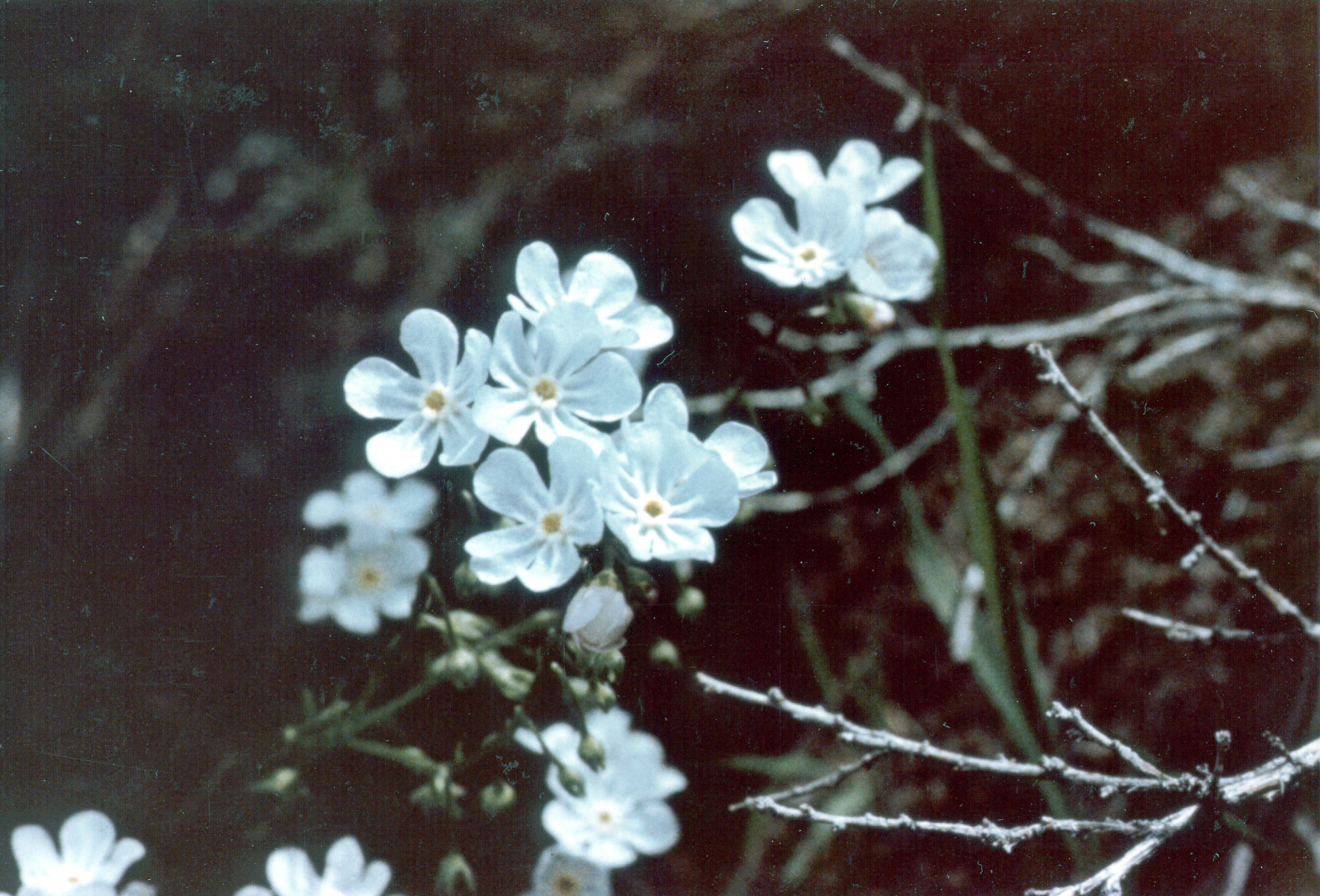

Conservation status
- Vulnerable (NatureServe)

Scientific classification
- Kingdom: Plantae
- Clade: Tracheophytes
- Clade: Angiosperms
- Clade: Eudicots
- Clade: Asterids
- Order: Boraginales
- Family: Boraginaceae
- Genus: Hackelia
- Species: H. cronquistii

Binomial name
- Hackelia cronquistii J.L.Gentry

= Hackelia cronquistii =

Species of flowering plant

Hackelia cronquistii is a species of flowering plant in the borage family known by the common name Cronquist's stickseed.

This species was formerly treated as a variety of Hackelia patens, until elevated to its own species status in 1972.

== Distribution ==
It is endemic to Oregon and Idaho in the Great Basin region and the Northwestern United States. It is native to a small area around the Oregon−Idaho border. It was known from just one population until 1982, when more were found. It was thought to be just from Oregon until 1993, when it was found in Idaho. There are about 52 populations known today. Though endemic to only the one small region and a listed Vulnerable species, it is considered locally stable.

It It grows on sandy soils in sagebrush scrub habitat dominated by Artemisia tridentata.

Associated plant species include Achillea millefolium, Achnatherum hymenoides, Arabis sp., Balsamorhiza sagittata, Chrysothamnus viscidiflorus, Crepis acuminata, Ericameria nauseosa, Eriophyllum lanatum, Erysimum capitatum, Festuca idahoensis, Leymus cinereus, Lupinus argenteus, Phlox longifolia, Poa secunda, Pseudoroegneria spicata, and Purshia tridentata.

== Description ==
Hackelia cronquistii is a perennial herb growing up to 65 centimeters (26 in) tall, growing from a taproot and branching caudex. The upright stems are hairy toward the top and hairless near the bases. The leaves near the base of the plant are up to 21 centimeters (8.3 in) long and 3.5 centimeters (1.4 in) wide. They become smaller higher up the stem. The forget-me-not flowers are blue-tinged white and measure up to 1.5 centimeters (0.59 in) wide. Flowering occurs mainly in May. The fruit is a small nutlet.
