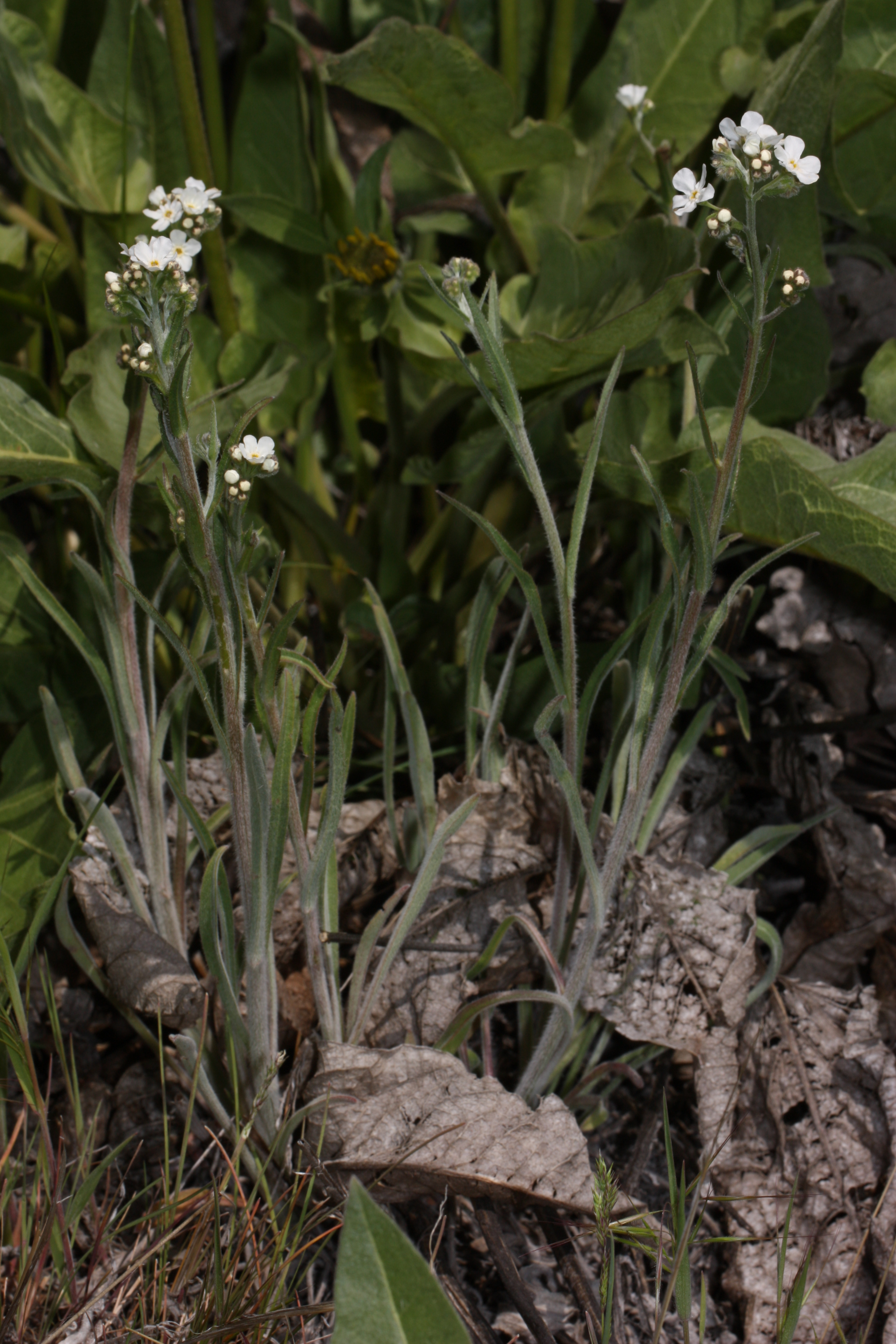
- Hackelia diffusa

Scientific classification
- Kingdom: Plantae
- Clade: Embryophytes
- Clade: Tracheophytes
- Clade: Spermatophytes
- Clade: Angiosperms
- Clade: Eudicots
- Clade: Asterids
- Order: Boraginales
- Family: Boraginaceae
- Subfamily: Boraginoideae
- Genus: Hackelia; Opiz (1839)

Type species
- Hackelia deflexa Opiz

Species
- About 54 (see text)

Synonyms
- Austrocynoglossum Popov ex R.Mill. (1989)

= Hackelia =

Genus of flowering plants in the borage family

Hackelia (stickseeds) is a genus of plants in the borage family, Boraginaceae. It includes 54 species found in North America, western South America, temperate Eurasia, and Australia. 12 species are native to California.

The genus was named after Josef Hackel, a Czech botanist. The common name, stickseed, refers to the tendency of the barbed nutlets to stick to animal fur.

== Species ==
54 species are currently accepted:

- Hackelia amethystina J.T.Howell – amethyst stickseed – California
- Hackelia andicola (K.Krause) Brand – Peru
- Hackelia bella (J.F.Macbr.) I.M.Johnst. – greater showy stickseed – northwestern California and southwestern Oregon
- Hackelia besseyi (Rydb.) J.L. Gentry – Bessey's stickseed – Arizona, Colorado, New Mexico and Texas
- Hackelia bhutanica R.R.Mill – eastern Nepal to northwestern Arunachal Pradesh
- Hackelia brachytuba (Diels) I.M.Johnst. – Nepal to central China
- Hackelia brevicula (Jeps.) J.L.Gentry – Poison Canyon stickseed – eastern California
- Hackelia californica (A.Gray) I.M.Johnst. – California stickseed – northern California and west-central Oregon
- Hackelia ciliata (Douglas ex Lehm.) I.M.Johnst. – British Columbia, Idaho, and Washington
- Hackelia cinerea (Piper) I.M.Johnst. – gray stickseed – Washington, Idaho, and Montana
- Hackelia cronquistii J.L.Gentry – Cronquist's stickseed – Oregon and Idaho
- Hackelia cusickii (Piper) Brand – Cusick's stickseed – Oregon, northern California, and northwestern Nevada
- Hackelia davisii Cronquist – Idaho
- Hackelia deflexa (Wahlenb.) Opiz – northern Eurasia and northern North America
- Hackelia difformis (Y.S.Lian & J.Q.Wang) Riedl – south-central China and Tibet
- Hackelia diffusa (Douglas ex Lehm.) I.M.Johnst. – Spreading stickseed – British Columbia, Washington, Oregon
- Hackelia floribunda (Lehm.) I.M.Johnst. – manyflower stickseed – western and central Canada and United States
- Hackelia gracilenta I.M.Johnst. – Colorado
- Hackelia heliocarpa (Brand) Brand – Mexico (Chihuahua)
- Hackelia hendersonii (Piper) Brand – Washington, Oregon, and Montana
- Hackelia hintoniorum (B.L.Turner) Sutorý – Mexico (Oaxaca)
- Hackelia hirsuta (Wooton & Standl.) I.M.Johnst. – New Mexico
- Hackelia hispida I.M.Johnst. – showy stickseed – Washington, Oregon, Idaho
- Hackelia ibapensis L.M.Shultz & J.S.Shultz – Utah
- Hackelia latifolia (R.Br.) Dimon & M.A.M.Renner – eastern Australia and Tasmania
- Hackelia leonotis I.M.Johnst. – northeastern and central Mexico
- Hackelia macrophylla (Brand) I.M.Johnst. – northern Pakistan and western Himalaya
- Hackelia meeboldii Brand – western Himalaya
- Hackelia mexicana (Schltdl. & Cham.) I.M.Johnst. – Mexico to Venezuela and Peru
- Hackelia micrantha (Eastw.) J.L.Gentry – Jessica sticktight – western Canada and United States
- Hackelia mundula (Jeps.) Ferris – pink stickseed – southwestern Oregon to central California
- Hackelia murgabica Czukav. – Tajikistan
- Hackelia nervosa (Kellogg) I.M.Johnst. – Sierra stickseed – California and northwestern Nevada
- Hackelia obtusifolia R.R.Mill – Bhutan
- Hackelia ophiobia R.L.Carr – southeastern Oregon, southwestern Idaho, and northern Nevada
- Hackelia parviflora (K.Krause) Brand – Peru (Junín)
- Hackelia patens (Nutt.) I.M.Johnst. – spotted stickseed – west-central United States
- Hackelia pinetorum (Greene ex A.Gray) I.M.Johnst. – Arizona, New Mexico, Texas, and northern Mexico
- Hackelia popovii Czukav. – Tajikistan
- Hackelia rattanii (Brand) Brand – Mexico (Baja California)
- Hackelia revoluta (Ruiz & Pav.) I.M.Johnst. – Colombia to northwestern Argentina
- Hackelia sessilifructa (Y.S.Lian & J.Q.Wang) Ovczinnikova – Xinjiang
- Hackelia setosa (Piper) I.M.Johnst. – bristly stickseed – northern California and southwestern Oregon
- Hackelia sharsmithii I.M.Johnst. – Sharsmith's stickseed – central California and central Nevada
- Hackelia skutchii I.M.Johnst. – Guatemala and Costa Rica
- Hackelia stewartii I.M.Johnst. – northern Pakistan and western Himalaya
- Hackelia stricta I.M.Johnst. – southwestern Mexico to Veracruz
- Hackelia suaveolens (R.Br.) Dimon & M.A.M.Renner – eastern and southern Australia and Tasmania
- Hackelia taylorii Harrod, Malmquist & R.L.Carr – Washington
- Hackelia torva (Dimon & M.A.M.Renner) Ovchinnikova – Australia
- Hackelia uncinata (Royle ex Benth.) C.E.C.Fisch. – northeastern Pakistan to Himalaya and southern China
- Hackelia ursina (Greene ex A.Gray) I.M.Johnst. – southeastern Arizona, southwestern New Mexico, and northern Mexico (Sonora)
- Hackelia velutina (Piper) I.M.Johnst. – velvet stickseed – north-central and central California and northwestern Nevada
- Hackelia venusta (Piper) H.St.John – lesser showy stickseed – central Washington
- Hackelia virginiana (L.) I.M.Johnst. – beggar's lice – central and eastern United States and eastern Canada
