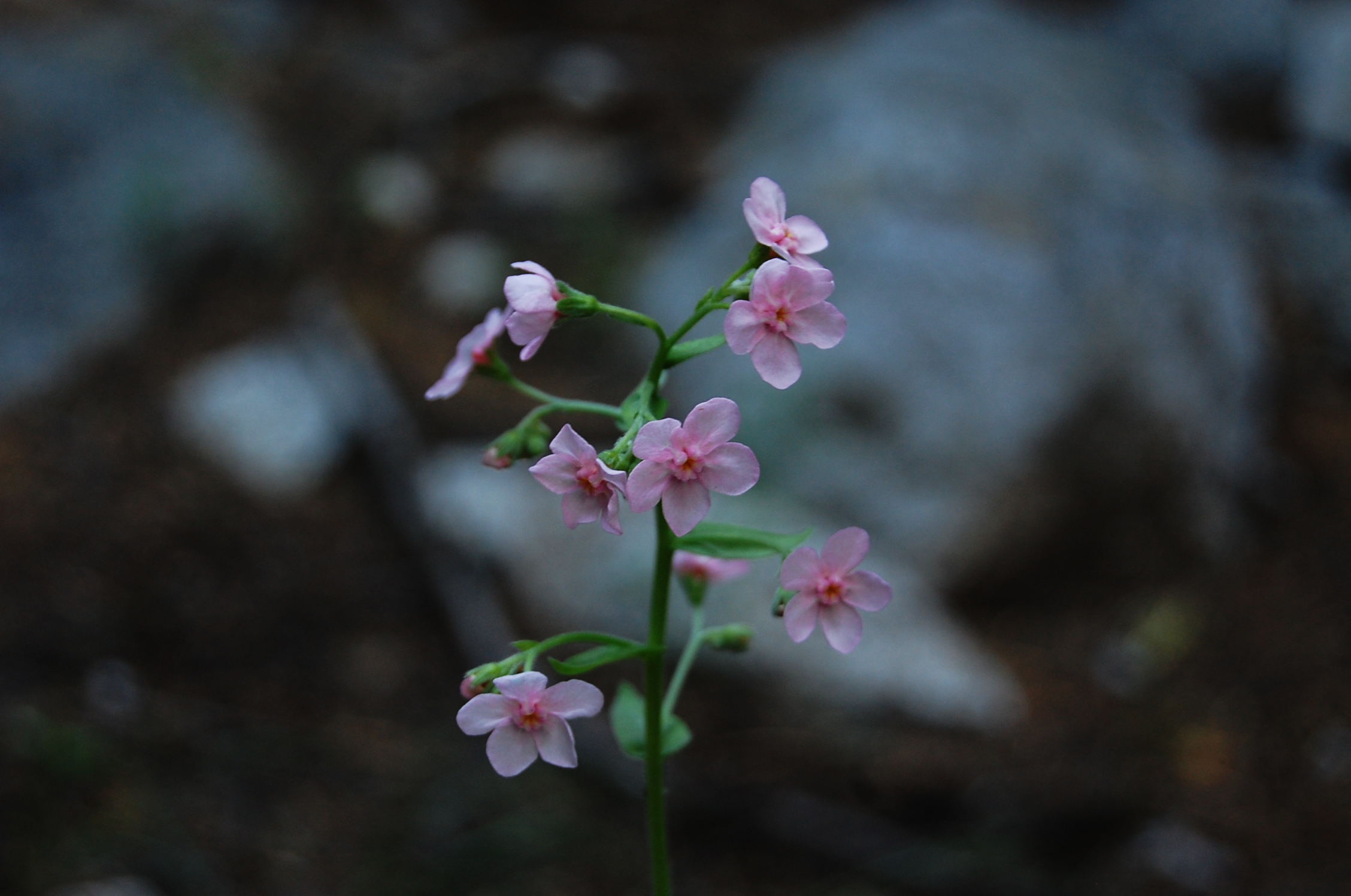

Scientific classification
- Kingdom: Plantae
- Clade: Tracheophytes
- Clade: Angiosperms
- Clade: Eudicots
- Clade: Asterids
- Order: Boraginales
- Family: Boraginaceae
- Genus: Hackelia
- Species: H. mundula

Binomial name
- Hackelia mundula (Jeps.) Ferris

= Hackelia mundula =

Species of flowering plant

Hackelia mundula is a species of flowering plant in the borage family known by the common name pink stickseed. It is native to the high mountains of California, especially the Sierra Nevada. Its range extends into Oregon. This is a lush, hairy perennial herb growing to maximum heights between 40 and 80 centimeters (16 and 31 in). It produces an array of erect stems with oval- or lance-shaped leaves most abundant around the bases, growing up to 22 centimeters (8.7 in) long. The upper stems are mostly leafless and hold cyme inflorescences of flowers. Each petite flower has 5 rounded lobes which are light pink and age to light blue in color, each with a smaller petallike appendage at its base. The fruit is a small nutlet covered in thin, hairlike prickles.
