= Hackelia latifolia =

- In Olinda, Victoria

Scientific classification
- Kingdom: Plantae
- Clade: Tracheophytes
- Clade: Angiosperms
- Clade: Eudicots
- Clade: Asterids
- Order: Boraginales
- Family: Boraginaceae
- Genus: Hackelia
- Species: H. latifolia

Binomial name
- Hackelia latifolia (R.Br.) Dimon & M.A.M.Renner

Synonyms
- Austrocynoglossum latifolium (R.Br.) R.R.Mill; Cynoglossum latifolium R.Br.

Species of flowering plant

Hackelia latifolia, commonly known as forest hound's tongue, is a species of flowering plant in the borage family. The species is native to Australia.

== Distribution ==
The plant is endemic to Australia and is found in Victoria, New South Wales, and Queensland.

== Description ==
Hackelia latifolia has a trailing habit with stems to 1m long, stems have numerous prickly and hairlike hooks sometimes called setae. Leaves are oval shaped (ovate to broad-ovate) and contain similar prickly hairs.

The flowers are small, with usually white sepals.
