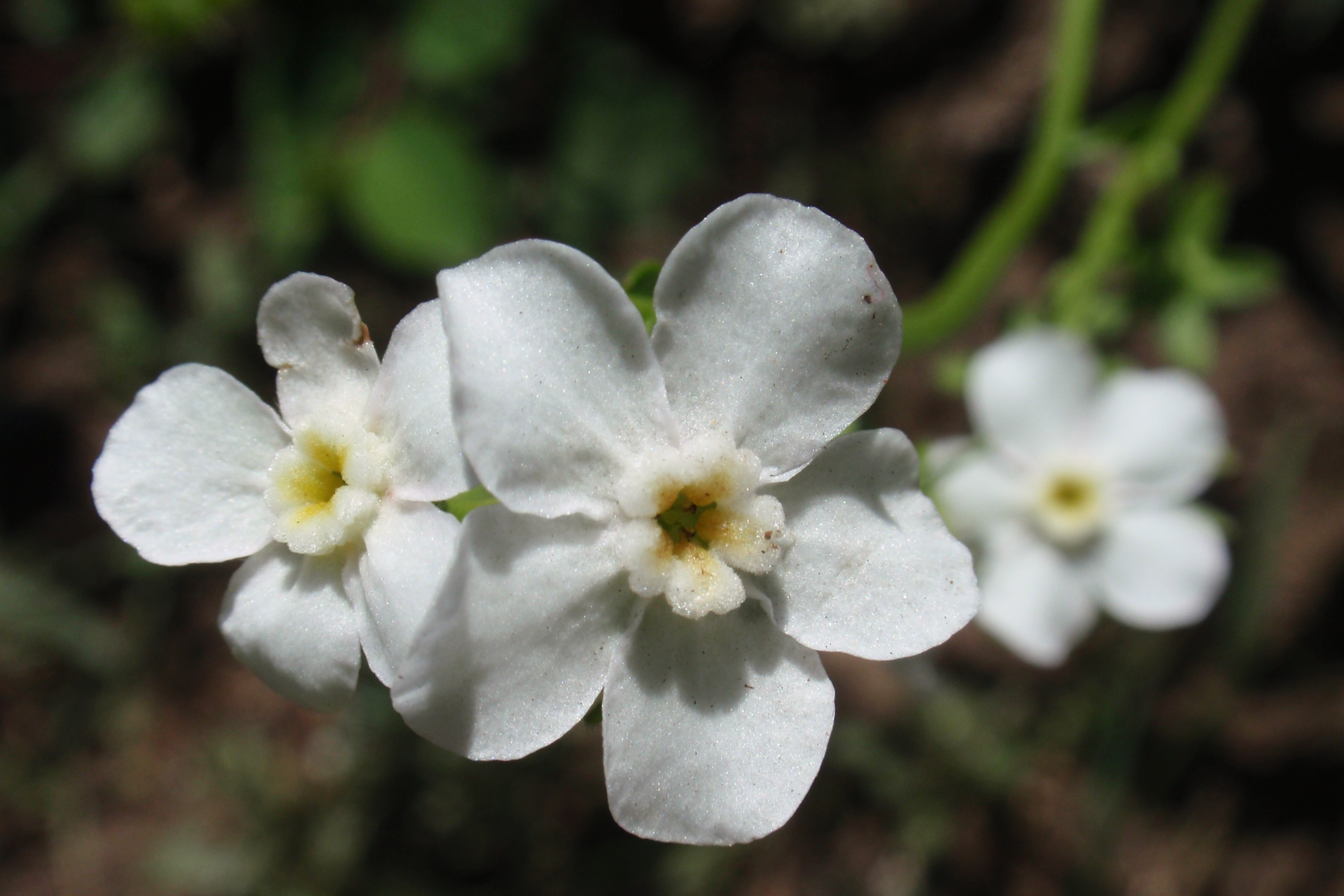

Scientific classification
- Kingdom: Plantae
- Clade: Tracheophytes
- Clade: Angiosperms
- Clade: Eudicots
- Clade: Asterids
- Order: Boraginales
- Family: Boraginaceae
- Genus: Hackelia
- Species: H. californica

Binomial name
- Hackelia californica (Gray) I.M.Johnst.

= Hackelia californica =

Species of flowering plant

Hackelia californica is a species of flowering plant in the borage family known by its common name, California stickseed.

== Distribution ==
The plant is native to the mountain ranges of northern California and southern Oregon, including the southern Cascade Range, Northern California Coast Ranges, and Sierra Nevada. It is found at elevations of 940–2,490 metres (3,080–8,170 ft), on slopes and meadows in yellow pine forest and red fir forest habitats.

== Description ==
Hackelia californica is a leafy perennial herb grows in tall clumps and produces erect stems up to a meter in maximum height. The lance-shaped leaves are longest and most abundant near the base of the plant, where the longest are about 17 centimetres (6.7 in) long.

The tips of the stems have few leaves and are occupied by cyme inflorescences of white flowers. Each flower has five lobes with a small petallike appendage at its base. The bloom period is June to August.

The fruit is a prickly nutlet about 4 millimeters wide.
