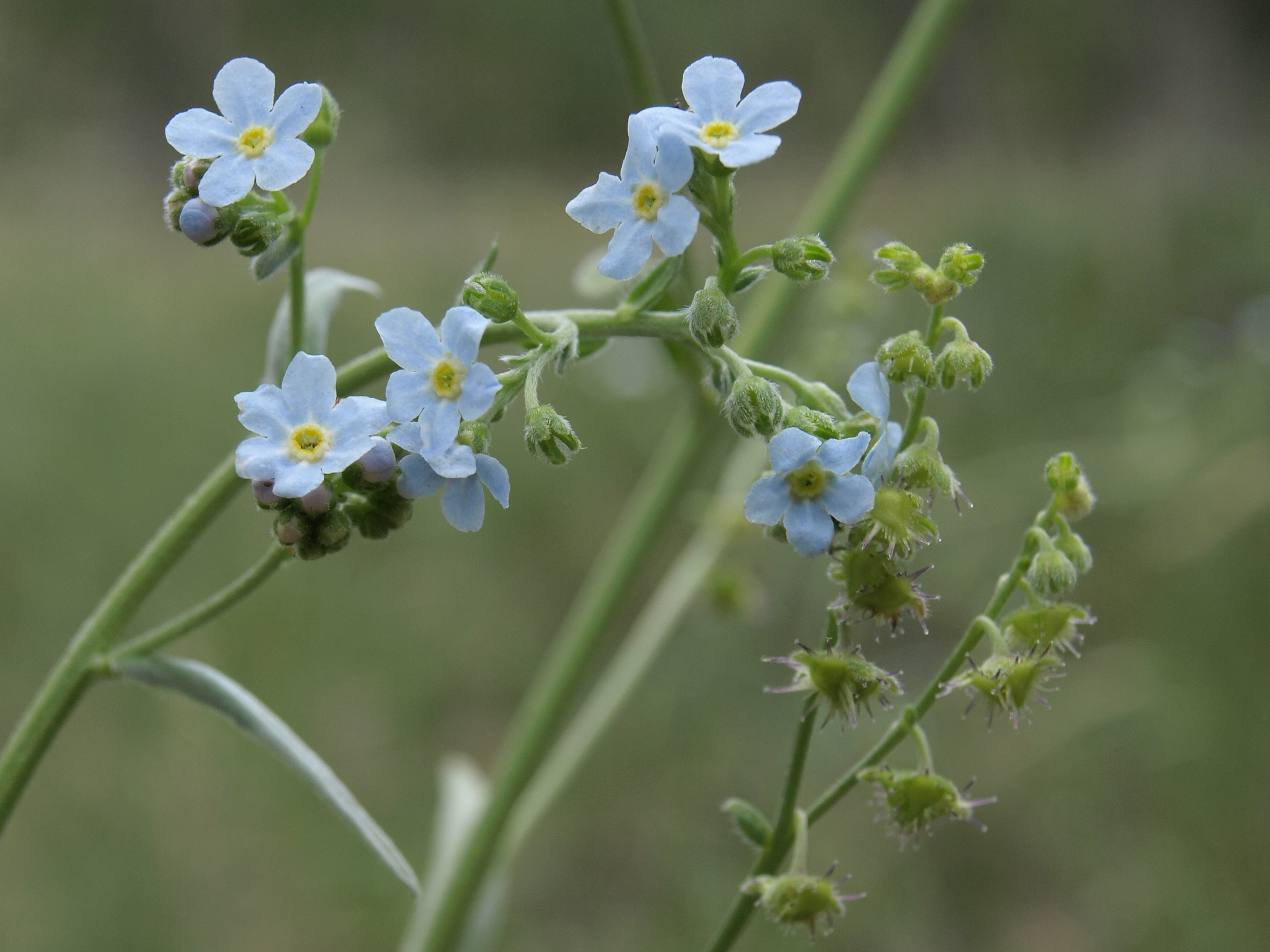
- Poison Canyon stickseed

Conservation status
- Vulnerable (NatureServe)

Scientific classification
- Kingdom: Plantae
- Clade: Embryophytes
- Clade: Tracheophytes
- Clade: Spermatophytes
- Clade: Angiosperms
- Clade: Eudicots
- Clade: Asterids
- Order: Boraginales
- Family: Boraginaceae
- Genus: Hackelia
- Species: H. brevicula

Binomial name
- Hackelia brevicula (Jeps.) J.L.Gentry

Synonyms
- Lappula coerulescens var. brevicula

= Hackelia brevicula =

Plant species in the borage family

Hackelia brevicula is a species of flowering plant in the borage family known by the common name Poison Canyon stickseed.

== Distribution ==
The plant is endemic to eastern California. It is native to the Inyo Mountains and White Mountains, within Inyo County and Mono County and the Inyo National Forest. It grows at 2,700–3,150 metres (8,860–10,330 ft) in elevation, on dry rocky slopes, scrubby areas, and open quaking aspen stand habitats.

It is a listed Vulnerable species, and is on the California Native Plant Society Inventory of Rare and Endangered Plants.

== Description ==
Hackelia brevicula is a perennial herb 20 to 60 centimeters (7.9 to 24 in) tall and coated thinly in stiff hairs. Most of the leaves are located around the base of the plant, reaching up to 18 centimeters long; there are a few smaller leaves on the stem itself.

The inflorescence is an open array of branches, each a coiling panicle of flowers. Each flower is just over a centimeter wide with light blue lobes with white appendages at the bases. The fruit is a cluster of nutlets which are often prickly. The bloom period is July.

== Taxonomy ==
In 1943 the botanist Willis Linn Jepson described a new variety of Lappula coerulescens that he named brevicula. In 1974 Johnnie Lee Gentry moved it to the genus Hackelia and at the same time raised it to a species named Hackelia brevicula. Together with its genus it is classified in the Boraginaceae family.
