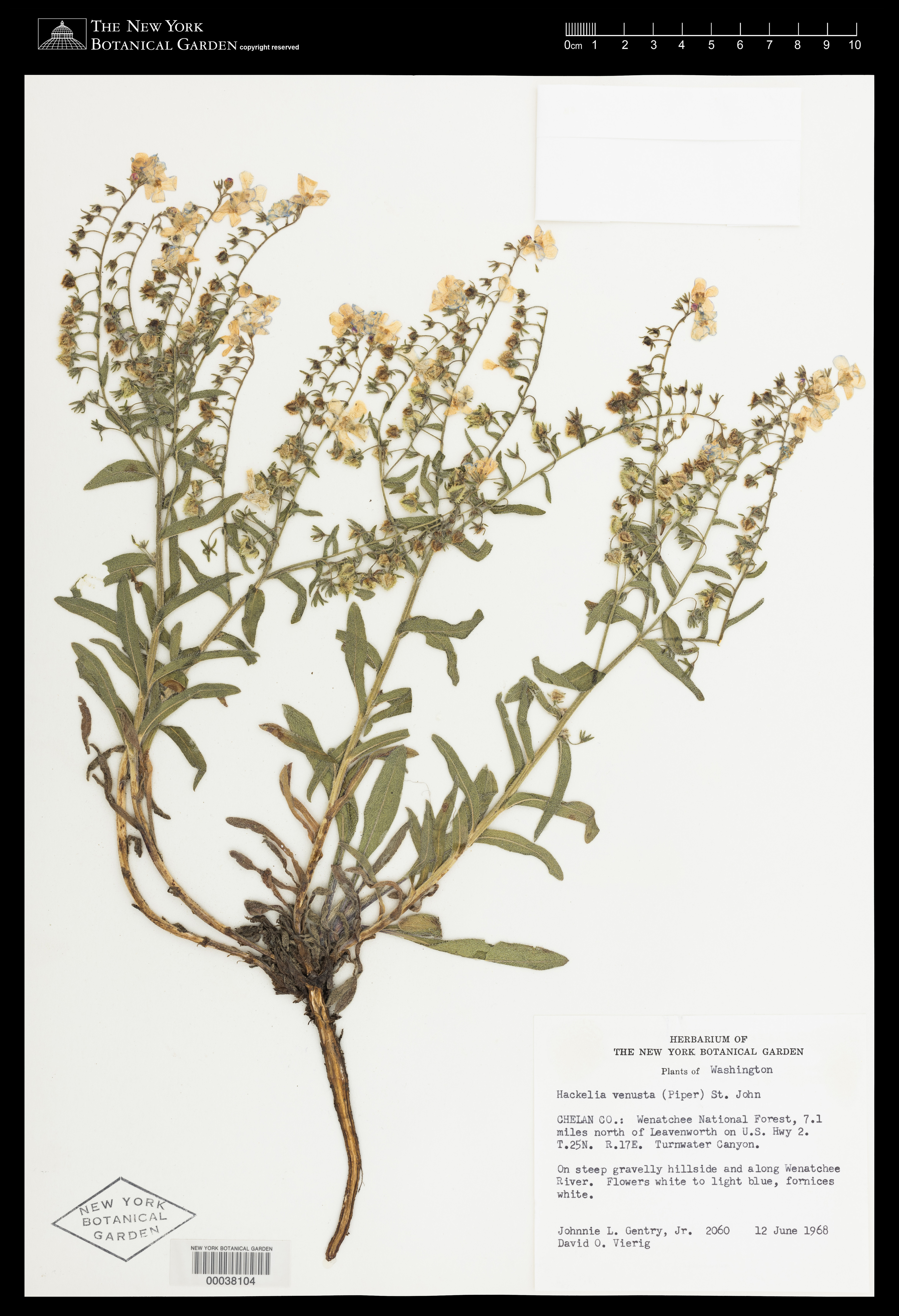

Conservation status
- Critically Imperiled (NatureServe)

Scientific classification
- Kingdom: Plantae
- Clade: Tracheophytes
- Clade: Angiosperms
- Clade: Eudicots
- Clade: Asterids
- Order: Boraginales
- Family: Boraginaceae
- Genus: Hackelia
- Species: H. venusta

Binomial name
- Hackelia venusta (Piper) H.St.John

= Hackelia venusta =

Species of flowering plant

Hackelia venusta is a rare species of flowering plant in the borage family known by the common name showy stickseed, or lesser showy stickseed. It is endemic to Washington state in the United States, where it is known from only one canyon in Chelan County. There is only one small population with a global distribution of less than one hectare. The plant was federally listed as an endangered species of the United States in 2002.

This is a perennial herb producing several leafy stems up to 20 to 40 centimeters (7.9 to 15.7 in) tall from a taproot. The plant blooms in April and May, bearing clusters of white or blue-tinged flowers. Each flower is 1–2 centimeters (0.4–0.8 in) across with five rounded lobes and a short tubular throat. The fruit is a nutlet covered with hooked hairs that allow it to attach to the fur of animals and be dispersed from the parent plant. The hooks are sticky enough to cling to human skin.

The plant is only found in Tumwater Canyon within the Tumwater Botanical Area in Wenatchee National Forest. Any other populations have been extirpated or determined to belong to other species. This plant grows in open talus and rock ledges between stands of Ponderosa pine and Douglas-fir. The soil is sandy and rocky and low in nutrients, and few other plants grow in it. The plant does not tolerate shade. The openings are in an early stage of ecological succession, a stage which is maintained by wildfire that periodically clears trees and shrubs. As fire suppression is practiced in forests to protect property, large and woody vegetation grows up and shades out the rare plant and other shade-intolerant species. The prevention of fire also allows a layer of nutrient-rich leaf-litter and other material to build up on the forest floor, allowing many other plants to grow and compete with the stickseed. In addition, when a fire does occur after a longer period the flames burn hotter and are more destructive, killing roots that might otherwise survive a mild fire, and increasing the likelihood of landslides and erosion.

The species is threatened by its small size, as its single population could be easily eliminated by a single large event. It is threatened by the lack of suitable habitat, which has been reduced in size by factors such as fire suppression. Introduced species of plants such as Dalmatian toadflax have invaded the area. Road maintenance practices, herbicides, and pollution may have contributed to the rarity of the plant. The seedlings of the species have a low rate of survivorship, with few growing to mature size. The small size of the population suggests there is a small gene pool.

In 2010 the total population of this species was estimated to be no more than 772 individuals. Research suggests that to be viable it would need to exceed 1000.
