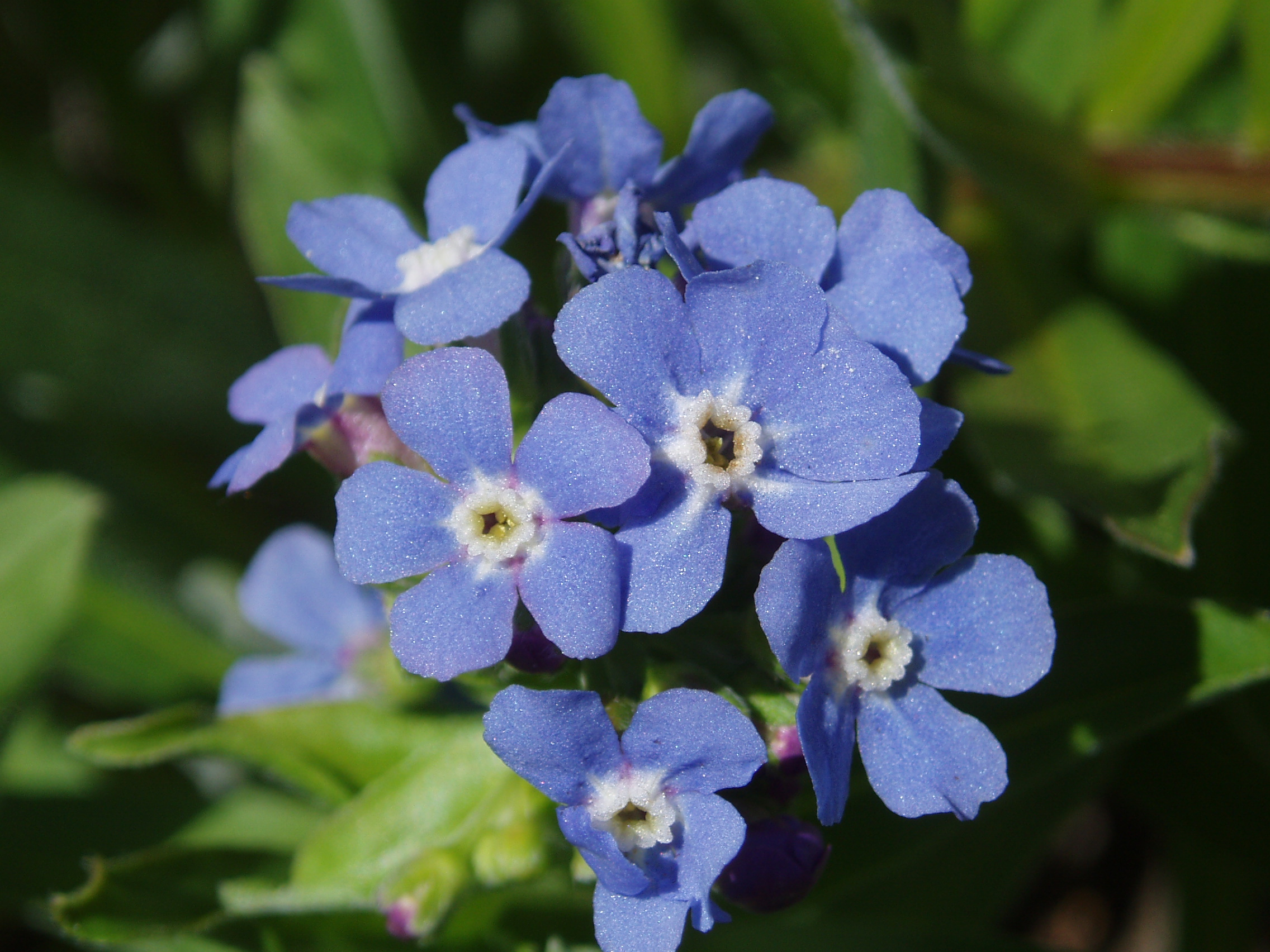

Scientific classification
- Kingdom: Plantae
- Clade: Tracheophytes
- Clade: Angiosperms
- Clade: Eudicots
- Clade: Asterids
- Order: Boraginales
- Family: Boraginaceae
- Genus: Hackelia
- Species: H. velutina

Binomial name
- Hackelia velutina (Piper) I.M.Johnst.

Synonyms
- Hackelia longituba

= Hackelia velutina =

Species of flowering plant

Hackelia velutina is a species of flowering plant in the borage family known by its common name, velvet stickseed.

== Distribution ==
It is endemic to California, growing in the Sierra Nevada in red fir and lodgepole pine forest habitats.

== Description ==
Hackelia velutina is a lush, hairy perennial herb reaching a maximum height between 40 and 80 centimeters (16 and 31 in). Most of the lance-shaped leaves are located around the base of the erect stems, the longest to about 17 centimeters (6.7 in).

Atop the stems are cyme inflorescences of bright blue to lavender flowers. Each small tubular flower has five lobes with a petallike appendage at the base of each.

The fruit is a nutlet covered in long prickles.
