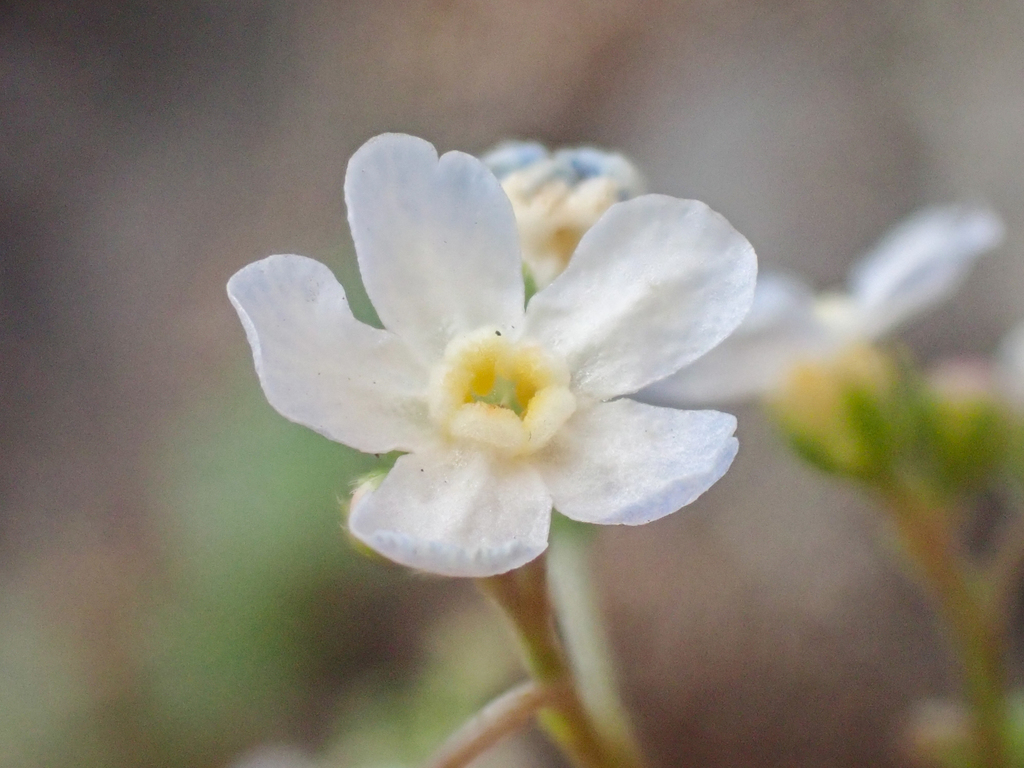

Scientific classification
- Kingdom: Plantae
- Clade: Tracheophytes
- Clade: Angiosperms
- Clade: Eudicots
- Clade: Asterids
- Order: Boraginales
- Family: Boraginaceae
- Genus: Hackelia
- Species: H. cusickii

Binomial name
- Hackelia cusickii (Piper) Brand

= Hackelia cusickii =

Species of flowering plant

Hackelia cusickii is a species of flowering plant in the borage family known by the common name Cusick's stickseed.

== Distribution ==
The plant is native to the Modoc Plateau in the northeastern corner of California and adjacent sections of Nevada and Oregon.

It grows at elevations of 1,300–1,950 metres (4,270–6,400 ft), in subalpine coniferous forest, Northern Sierra juniper woodlands, and talus of alpine fell-field habitats.

== Description ==
Hackelia cusickii is a perennial herb up to about 50 centimetres (20 in) tall and coated thinly in stiff hairs. Most of the leaves are located around the base of the plant, reaching up to 18 centimetres (7.1 in) long; there are a few smaller leaves on lower part of the stem as well.

The hairy inflorescence is an open array of branches, each a coiling panicle of flowers. Each flower is just over a centimeter wide with blue lobes with white appendages at the bases. The boom period is from May to July.

The fruit is a cluster of prickly nutlets.
