= Hackelia patens =

Scientific classification
- Kingdom: Plantae
- Clade: Tracheophytes
- Clade: Angiosperms
- Clade: Eudicots
- Clade: Asterids
- Order: Boraginales
- Family: Boraginaceae
- Genus: Hackelia
- Species: H. patens

Binomial name
- Hackelia patens (Nutt.) I.M.Johnst

Species of plant

Hackelia patens, the spotted stickseed, is a species of flowering plant in the family Boraginaceae. It is native to the western United States and as far east as Utah and Montana.

Hackelia patens has 2-3 stems that are 2.5-4.0 centimeters in diameter. It has basal leaves, that are up to 10 centimeters long. It is found at high elevations.
