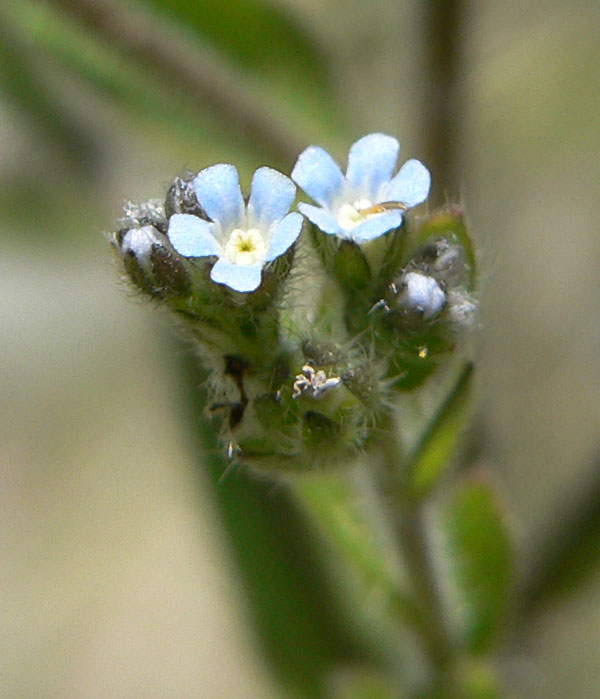
- Lappula redowskii var. redowskii flowers

Conservation status
- Secure (NatureServe)

Scientific classification
- Kingdom: Plantae
- Clade: Tracheophytes
- Clade: Angiosperms
- Clade: Eudicots
- Clade: Asterids
- Order: Boraginales
- Family: Boraginaceae
- Genus: Lappula
- Species: L. occidentalis

Binomial name
- Lappula occidentalis Greene. (1901)

= Lappula occidentalis =

Species of flowering plant

Lappula occidentalis, also known as flatspine stickseed, flatspine sheepburr, western stickseed, Lappula redowskii, or Redowski's stickseed, is a biennial forb native to North America and parts of Europe and Asia. It belongs to the family Boraginaceae. Variants include L. redowskii var. cupulata and L. redowskii var. redowskii, which differ in fruit morphology from the type specimen.

== Description ==
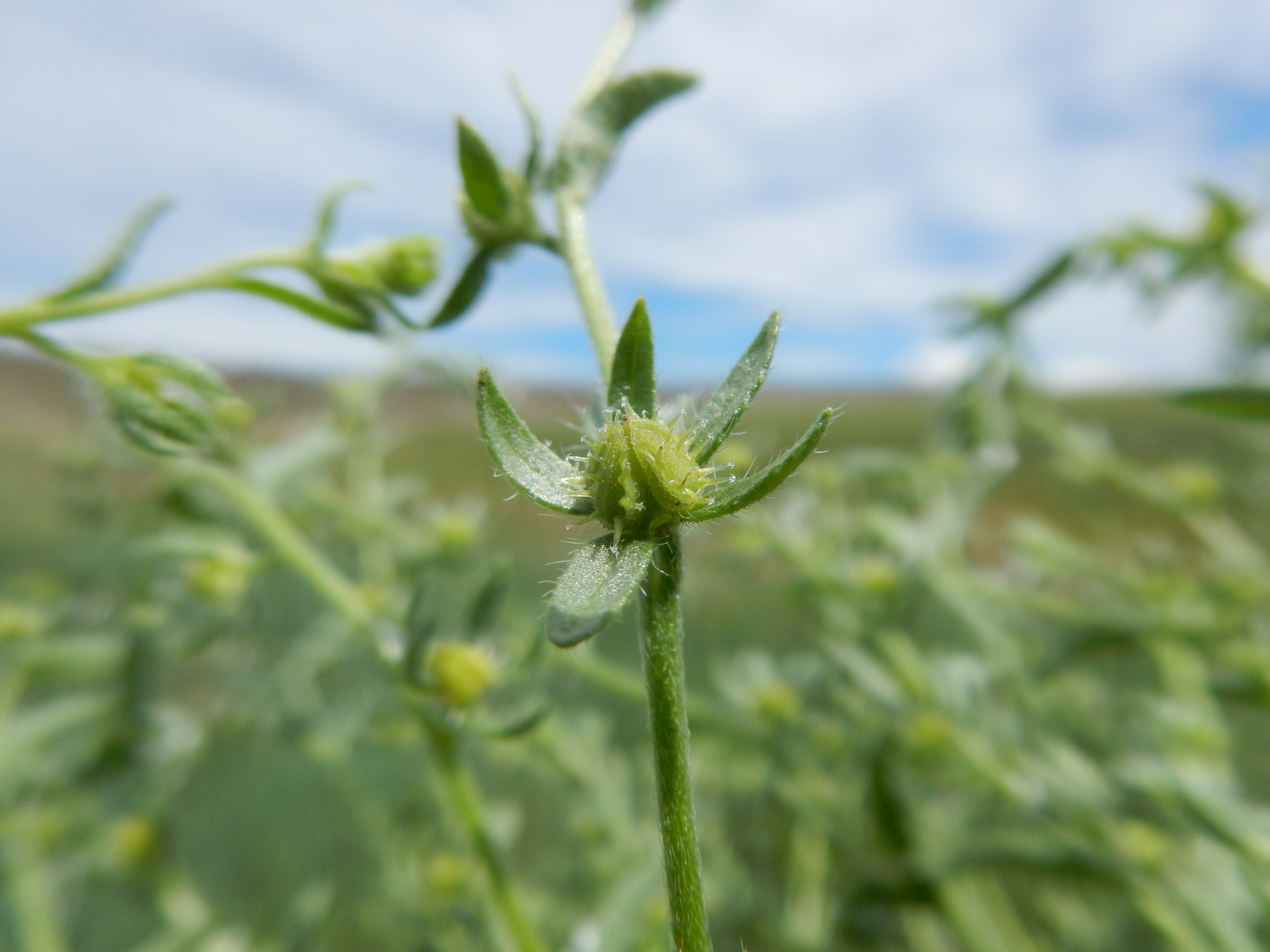
Fruits of Lappula occidentalis

Flatspine stickseed is a flowering herb that reproduces by fruiting. The fruits are divided into four nutlets that have a single row of velcro-like prickles along their edges. The stem is erect, angled, covered in fine hairs that may be appressed to spreading, 5 to 40 cm in height, and may be simple or branched in morphology. Leaves are simple, alternately arranged, with edges that are entire. Both basal and stem leaves are present. Basal leaves are mostly oblong with a rounded tip and tend to wither by flowering time. Leaves along the stem are narrowly lance-oblong and may reach 2 inches long while remaining up to about ¼ inch wide. Stem leaves may lie flat or become folded, are pointed at the tip while rounded at the base, appear stalkless, and diminish in size as they ascend the stem. The flowers of the flatspine sheepburr are blue to purple, radially symmetrical, and arranged in racemes that may extend from 2 to 8 inches as they mature. Each flower is approximately 1/8 inches in diameter, surrounded by five sepals, and is fused near the base. The flowers alternate with bracts along the stem. Bracts, sepals, stalks, and leaves are similarly covered in fine hairs that range from appressed to spreading.

== Uses ==
Western stickseed was used by the Navajo for ceremonial, gynecological, and dermatological purposes.

== Distribution ==
Lappula occidentalis is native to North America and polar regions of Europe and Asia. It may be found in disturbed habitats such as roadsides and along railways. Due to the nature of the fruit of the flatspine stickseed, animals such as sheep may aid in the spread of the forb to habitats disturbed by livestock.
