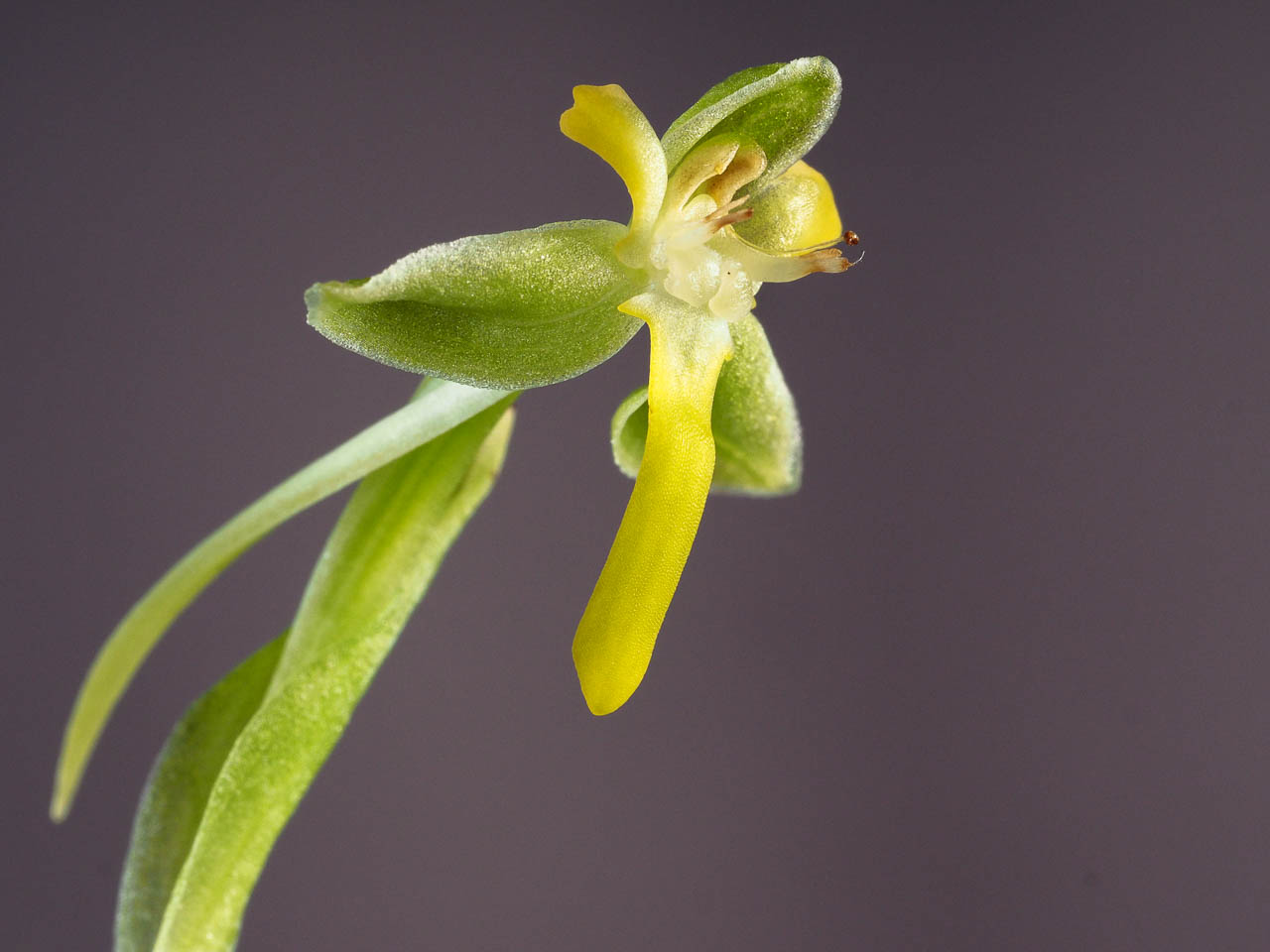

Scientific classification
- Kingdom: Plantae
- Clade: Embryophytes
- Clade: Tracheophytes
- Clade: Angiosperms
- Clade: Monocots
- Order: Asparagales
- Family: Orchidaceae
- Subfamily: Orchidoideae
- Genus: Habenaria
- Species: H. floribunda

Binomial name
- Habenaria floribunda Lindl.

Synonyms
- Platantheroides floribunda (Lindl.) Szlach.; Habenella floribunda (Lindl.) Szlach. & Kras-Lap.; Habenaria autumnalis Poepp. & Endl.; Habenaria odontopetala Rchb.f.; Habenaria garberi Porter; Platanthera garberi (Porter) Chapm.; Habenaria selerorum Schltr.; Habenella garberi (Porter) Small; Habenaria purdiei Fawc. & Rendle; Habenaria herzogii Schltr.; Habenaria tetrodon Kraenzl.; Habenella odontopetala (Rchb.f.) Small; Habenaria strictissima var. odontopetala (Rchb.f.) L.O.Williams; Habenaria odontopetala f. heatonii P.M.Br.; Platantheroides herzogii (Schltr.) Szlach.; Platantheroides odontopetala (Rchb.f.) Szlach.; Habenella herzogii (Schltr.) Szlach. & Kras-Lap.

= Habenaria floribunda =

Species of plant

Habenaria floribunda, common name Toothpetal false reinorchid, is a species of orchid which is widespread across much of Latin America, the West Indies and Florida.

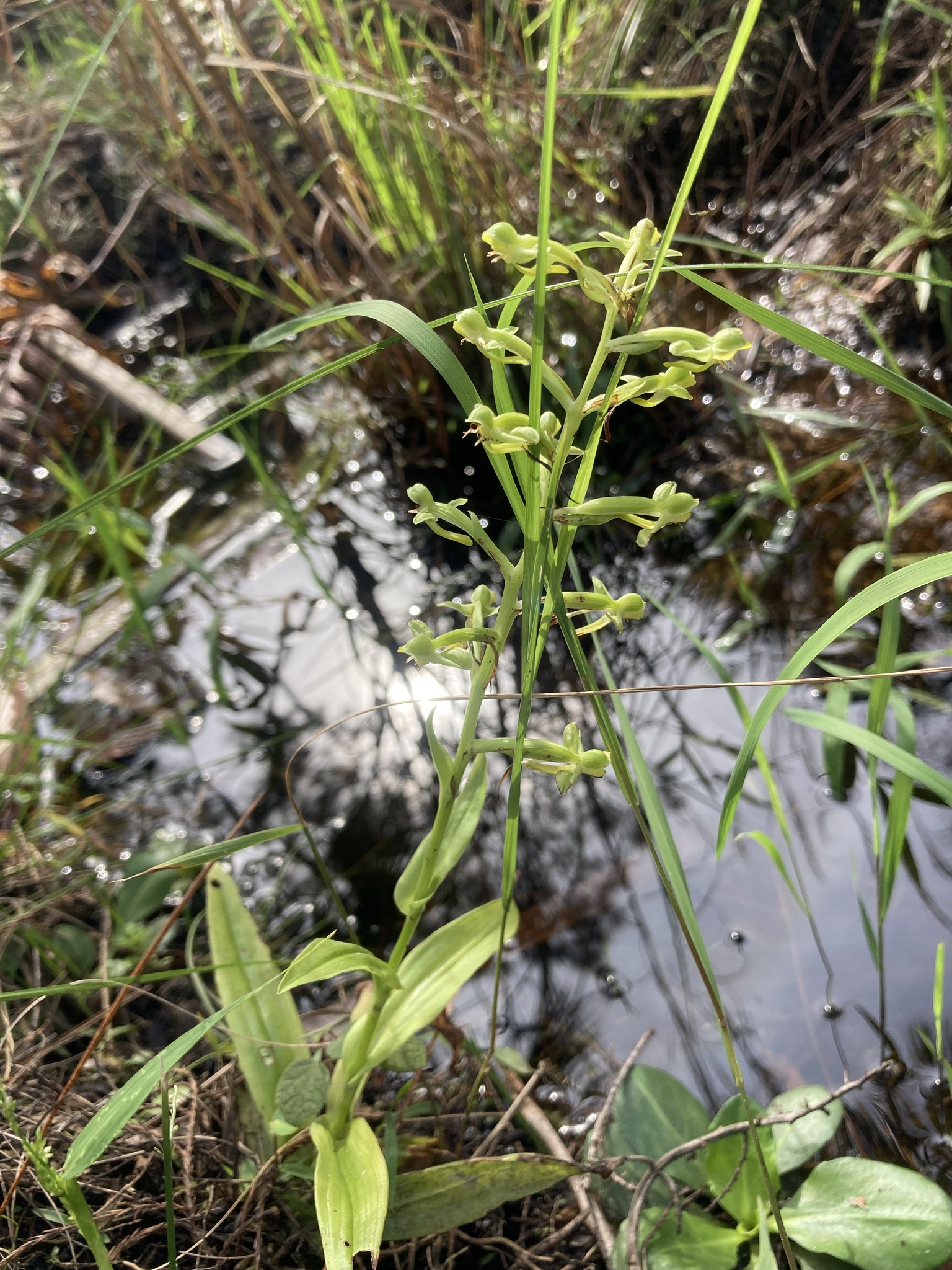

Growing in swampy areas and hardwood forests, it is the most common terrestrial orchid in Florida where it blooms from fall to winter. It grows in much of the Florida Peninsula.
