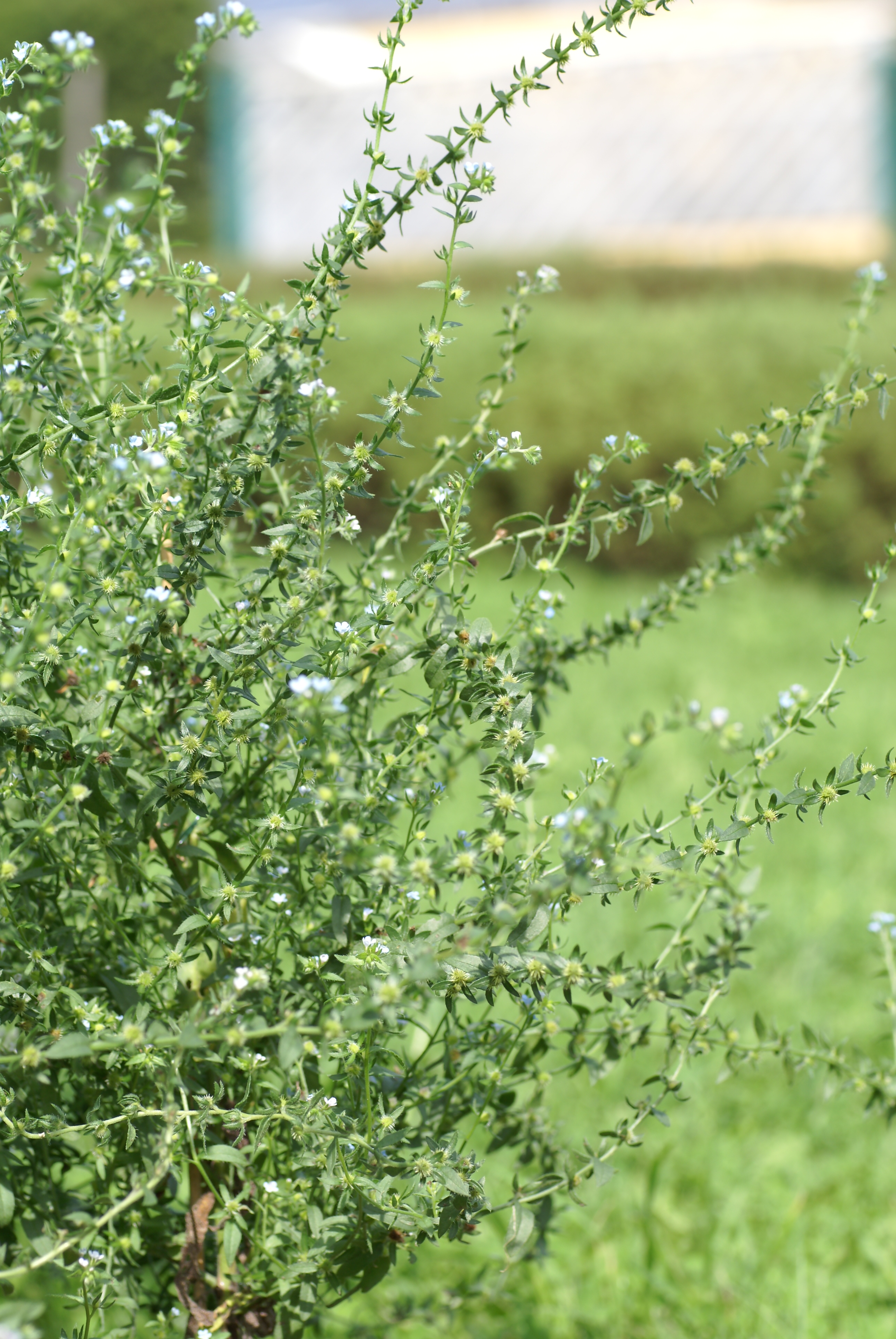
- Lappula squarrosa

Scientific classification
- Kingdom: Plantae
- Clade: Embryophytes
- Clade: Tracheophytes
- Clade: Spermatophytes
- Clade: Angiosperms
- Clade: Eudicots
- Clade: Asterids
- Order: Boraginales
- Family: Boraginaceae
- Subfamily: Boraginoideae
- Genus: Lappula; Moench (1794)

Type species
- Lappula myosotis Wolf

Species
- 80, see text

Synonyms
- Cynoglossospermum Siegesb. ex Kuntze (1891); Echinospermum Sw. ex Lehm. (1818); Rochelia Roem. & Schult. (1819), nom. superfl.; Sclerocaryopsis Brand (1931)

= Lappula =

Genus of flowering plants in the borage family

Lappula is a genus of flowering plants in the borage family known generally as stickseeds. They are native to temperate and subtropical regions of the world, including North America, Eurasia, North Africa, South Africa, and southern South America. These are annual herbs producing funnel-shaped flowers and prickly fruits. One of the best known species is the European stickseed, Lappula squarrosa, which is a notorious noxious weed.

== Species ==
80 species are accepted.

- Lappula aktaviensis Popov & Zakirov
- Lappula alaica (Popov) Nabiev
- Lappula albiflora (Riedl) Khoshsokhan & Kaz.Osaloo
- Lappula anisacantha (Turcz. ex Bunge) Gürke
- Lappula anocarpa C.J.Wang
- Lappula badachschanica Popov ex Ikonn.
- Lappula baitenovii Kudab.
- Lappula balchaschensis Popov ex Golosk.
- Lappula barbata (M.Bieb.) Gürke
- Lappula botschantzevii Ovczinnikova
- Lappula brachycentra (Ledeb.) Gürke
- Lappula brachycentroides Popov
- Lappula caespitosa C.J.Wang
- Lappula cenchroides A.Nelson – Great Plains stickseed
- Lappula coronifera Popov
- Lappula cynoglossoides (Lam.) Gürke
- Lappula deserticola C.J.Wang
- Lappula dichotoma Charit.
- Lappula diploloma (Fisch. & C.A.Mey.) Gürke
- Lappula duplicicarpa Pavlov
- Lappula dzharkentica Popov ex Golosk.
- Lappula fruticulosa Ovczinnikova
- Lappula glabrata Popov
- Lappula granulata (Krylov) Popov
- Lappula heteracantha (Ledeb.) Gürke
- Lappula heteromorpha C.J.Wang
- Lappula himalayensis Ching J.Wang
- Lappula intermedia (Ledeb.) Popov
- Lappula karelinii (Fisch. & C.A.Mey.) Kamelin
- Lappula ketmenica Kudab.
- Lappula korshinskyi Popov
- Lappula krylovii Ovczinnikova, Pjak & A.L.Ebel
- Lappula kulikalonica Zakirov
- Lappula kuprijanovii Ovchinnikova
- Lappula laevimarginata Riedl
- Lappula lenensis Popov ex Ovczinnikova
- Lappula leonardii Riedl
- Lappula lipschitzii Popov
- Lappula lipskyi Popov
- Lappula macra Popov
- Lappula macrantha (Ledeb.) Gürke
- Lappula marginata (M.Bieb.) Gürke – margined stickseed
- Lappula mogoltavica Popov ex Czukav.
- Lappula monocarpa C.J.Wang
- Lappula nevskii Raenko
- Lappula nuratavica Nabiev & Zakirov
- Lappula occidentalis (S.Watson) Greene – flatspine stickseed
- Lappula occultata Popov
- Lappula parvula Nabiev & Zakirov
- Lappula patula (Lehm.) Menyh.
- Lappula paulsenii (Brand) Popov
- Lappula pavlovii Golosk.
- Lappula physacantha Golosk.
- Lappula popovii Zakirov
- Lappula pratensis C.J.Wang
- Lappula ramulosa C.J.Wang & X.D.Wang
- Lappula rechingeri Riedl
- Lappula redowskii (Hornem.) Greene
- Lappula rupestris (Schrenk) Gürke
- Lappula rupicola Zakirov
- Lappula saissanica Aralbaev
- Lappula saphronovae Kamelin
- Lappula semialata Popov
- Lappula semnanensis Riedl & Iranshahr
- Lappula sericata Popov
- Lappula shanhsiensis Kitag.
- Lappula spinocarpos (Forssk.) Asch. ex Kuntze
- Lappula squarrosa (Retz.) Dumort. – European stickseed
- Lappula stricta (Ledeb.) Gürke
- Lappula subcaespitosa Popov ex Golosk.
- Lappula tadshikorum Popov
- Lappula tenuis (Ledeb.) Gürke
- Lappula texana (Scheele) Britton
- Lappula tianschanica Popov & Zakirov
- Lappula transalaica (Popov) Nabiev
- Lappula turczaninowii Ovchinnikova
- Lappula tuvinica Ovczinnikova
- Lappula wendelboi (Riedl) Khoshsokhan & Kaz.Osaloo
- Lappula zaissanica (Aralbaev) Aralbaev
