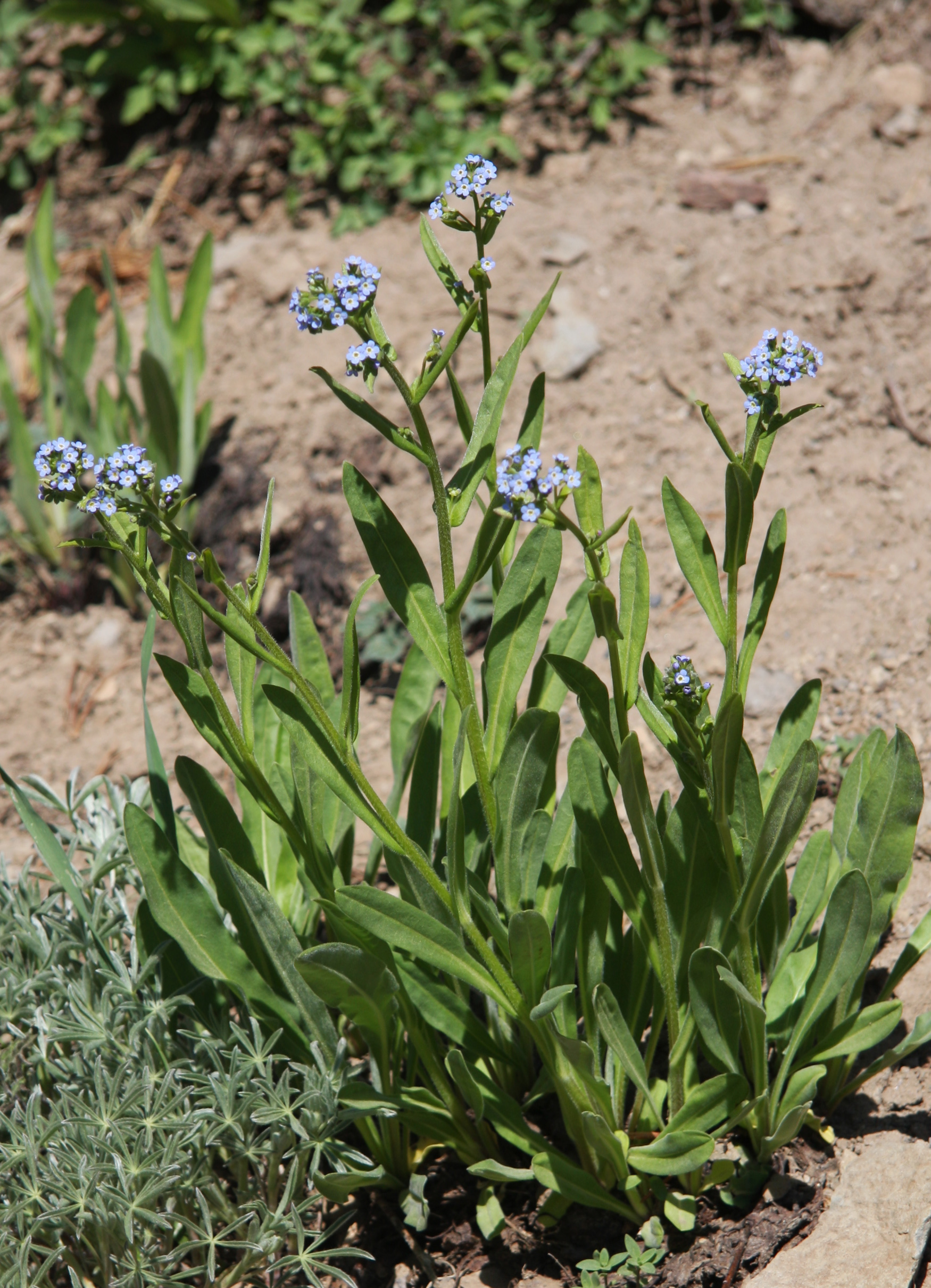

Scientific classification
- Kingdom: Plantae
- Clade: Tracheophytes
- Clade: Angiosperms
- Clade: Eudicots
- Clade: Asterids
- Order: Boraginales
- Family: Boraginaceae
- Genus: Hackelia
- Species: H. nervosa

Binomial name
- Hackelia nervosa (Kellogg) I.M.Johnst.

= Hackelia nervosa =

Species of flowering plant

Hackelia nervosa is a species of flowering plant in the borage family known by the common name Sierra stickseed. It is native to the mountains of California, especially the Sierra Nevada and its foothills, in areas with some moisture up to near treeline. Its range may extend into Nevada.

Sierra stickseed is a perennial herb starting from basal patches of oblong leaves each up to 12 centimeters (4.7 in) long. Erect stems rise to heights between 40 and 70 centimeters (16 and 28 in), with gradually fewer and smaller leaves toward the tops. The stems hold cyme inflorescences of deep sky blue to violet flowers; the buds are often pink. Each petite flower has five oblong rounded-end lobes, with a slightly raised appendage at the base of each forming a white ring around the yellow anthers. The flowerheads start off quite compact, but later the stems and petioles elongate to give a more open appearance. The fruit (the "stickseed") is a nutlet about half a centimeter long, covered with barb-tipped prickles that stick to almost anything, explaining the common name of this genus.

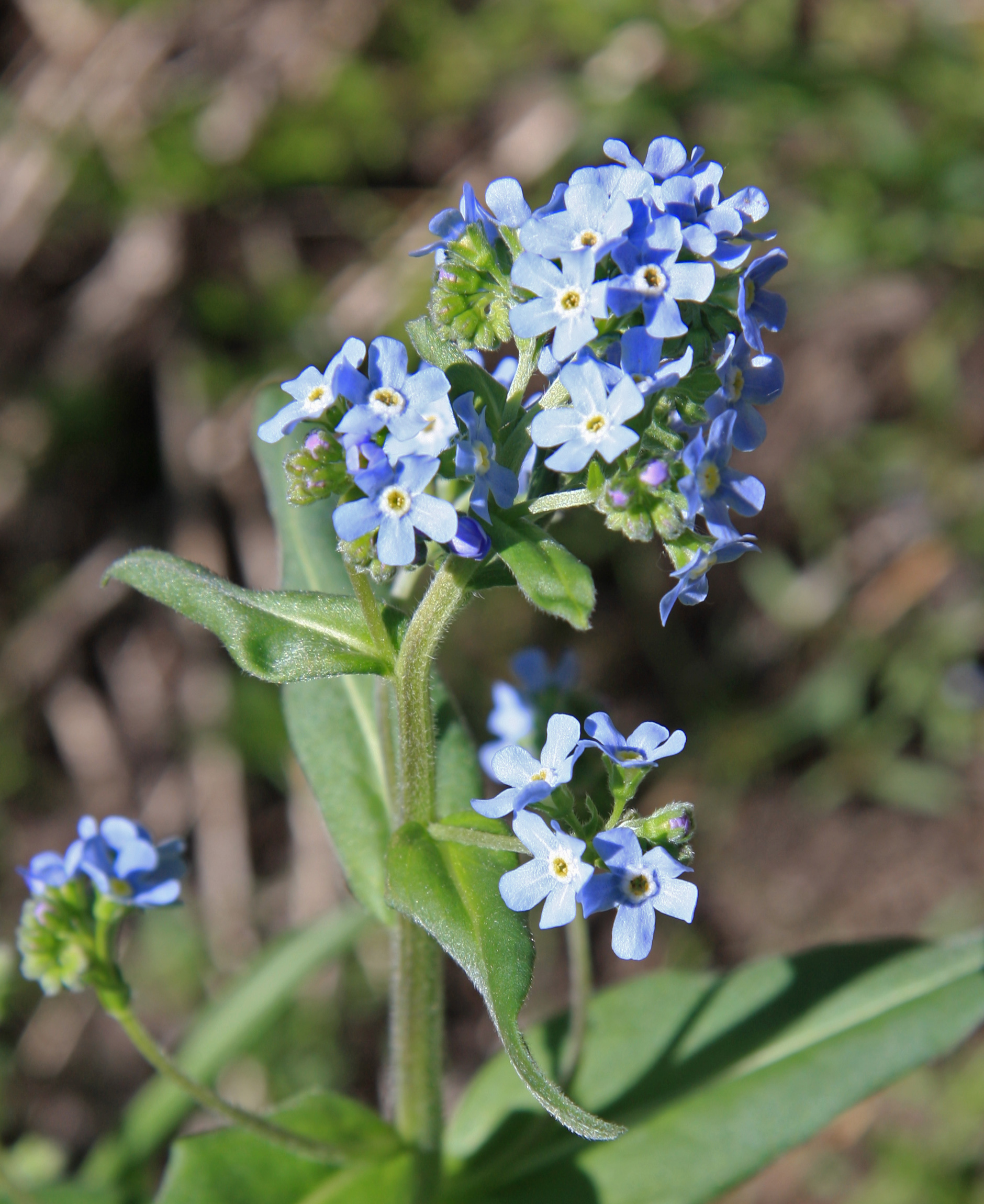
Sierra stickseed inflorescaece close

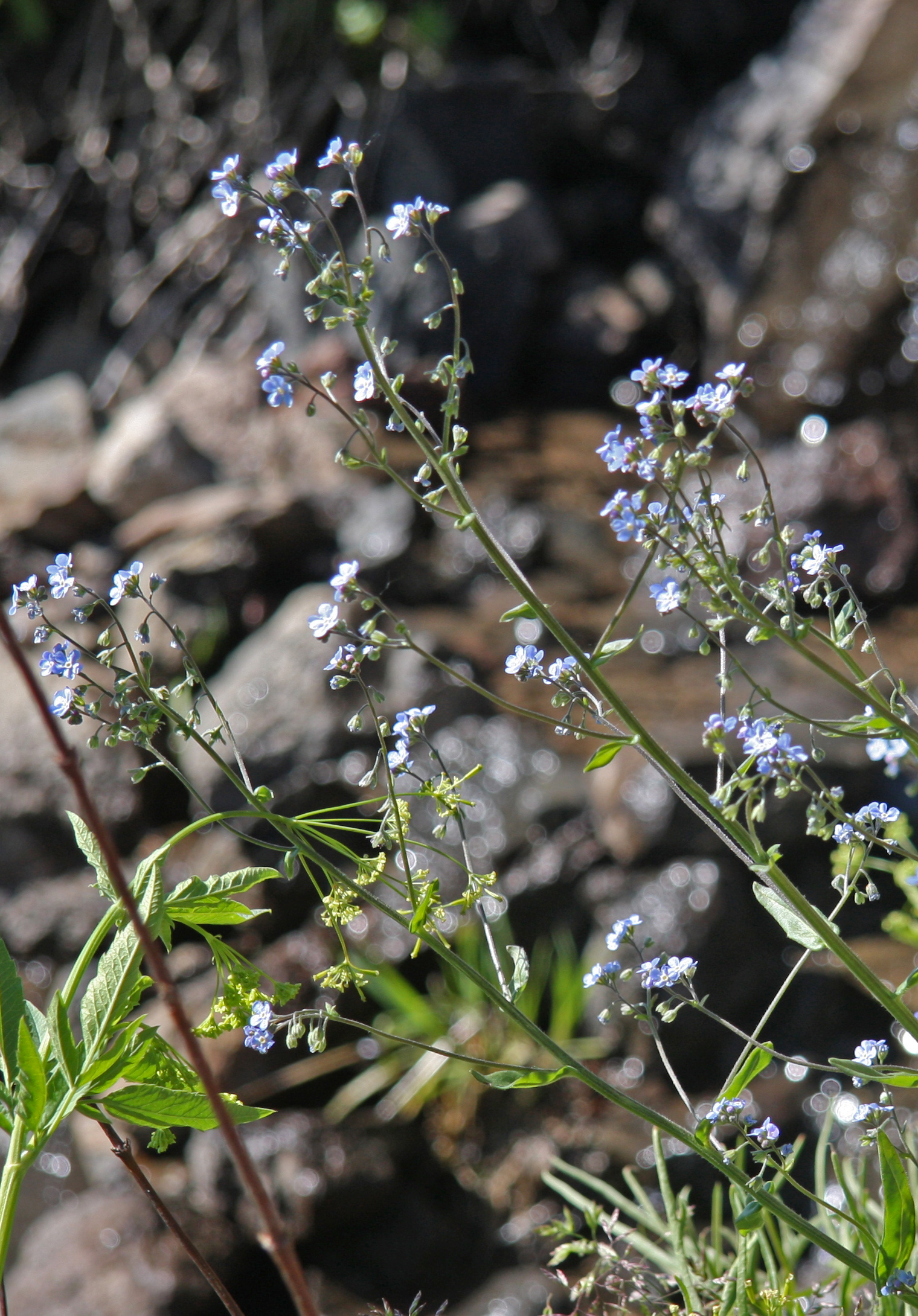
Later, open inflorescences

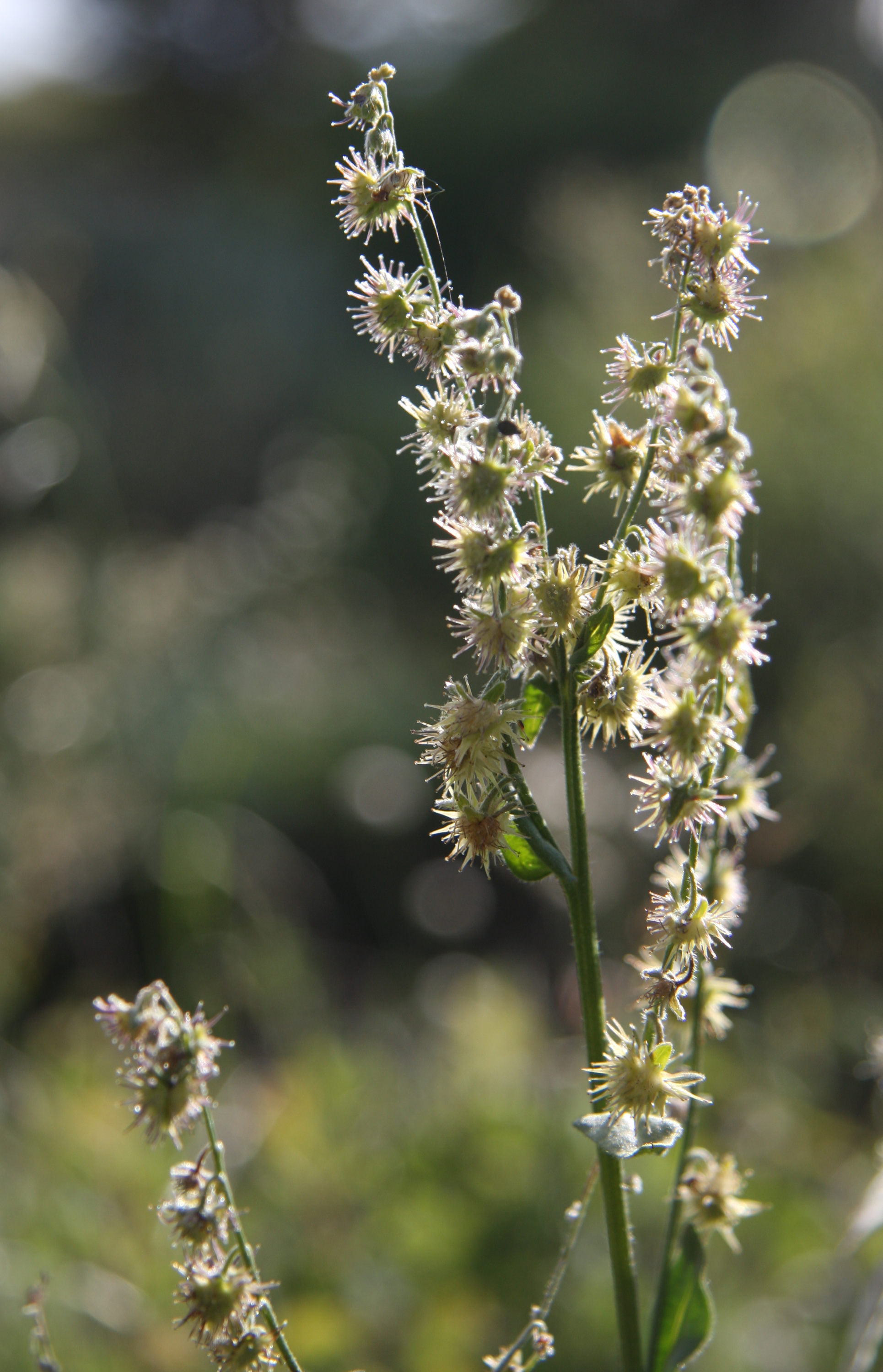
Sierra stickseed, prickly fruits
