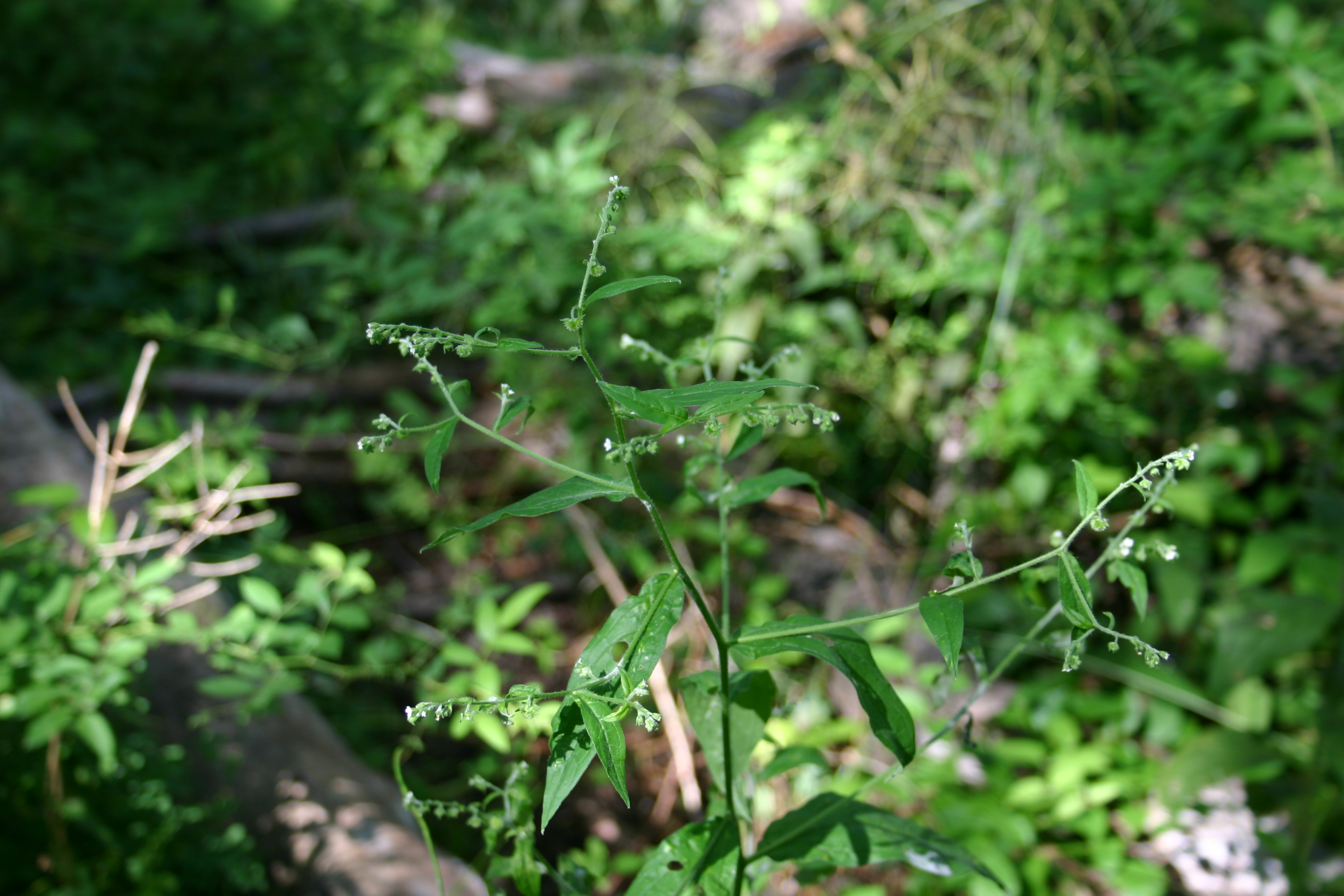

Scientific classification
- Kingdom: Plantae
- Clade: Tracheophytes
- Clade: Angiosperms
- Clade: Eudicots
- Clade: Asterids
- Order: Boraginales
- Family: Boraginaceae
- Genus: Hackelia
- Species: H. virginiana

Binomial name
- Hackelia virginiana (L.) I.M.Johnston

Synonyms
- Cynoglossospermum virginianum (L.) Kuntze; Echinospermum virginianum (L.) Lehm.; Rochelia virginiana (L.) Roem. & Schult.

= Hackelia virginiana =

Species of flowering plant

Hackelia virginiana, a biennial plant, is commonly known as beggar's lice, sticktight or stickseed. However, the common names beggar's lice and stick-tight are also used for very different plants, such as Desmodium species that are also known as "tick-trefoil".

== Distribution ==
The plant is native to Eastern Canada and throughout the Midwestern and Eastern United States.

== Description ==
Hackelia virginiana has simple, rough leaves and ribbed green stems. The plant is categorized Wetland Indicator Status: FACU (Facultative Upland).

The flowers are small and white, borne in mid-late summer. The seeds are burs, and are very sticky. The plant is native but a well-known nuisance in deciduous forests of the eastern U.S. because its tiny, abundant seeds can be difficult to remove from clothing and especially pet fur. The seeding part of the plant—the upper stem—dies earlier than most other plants, and becomes very brittle. Often the entire seed stem, or even the entire plant will come out of the ground if the seeds catch on clothing or fur, aiding seed dispersion.

During the plant's first year of growth it has only a basal rosette of foliage, with the flowering stalk ascending the second year. The leaves are dark green and irregularly shaped.
