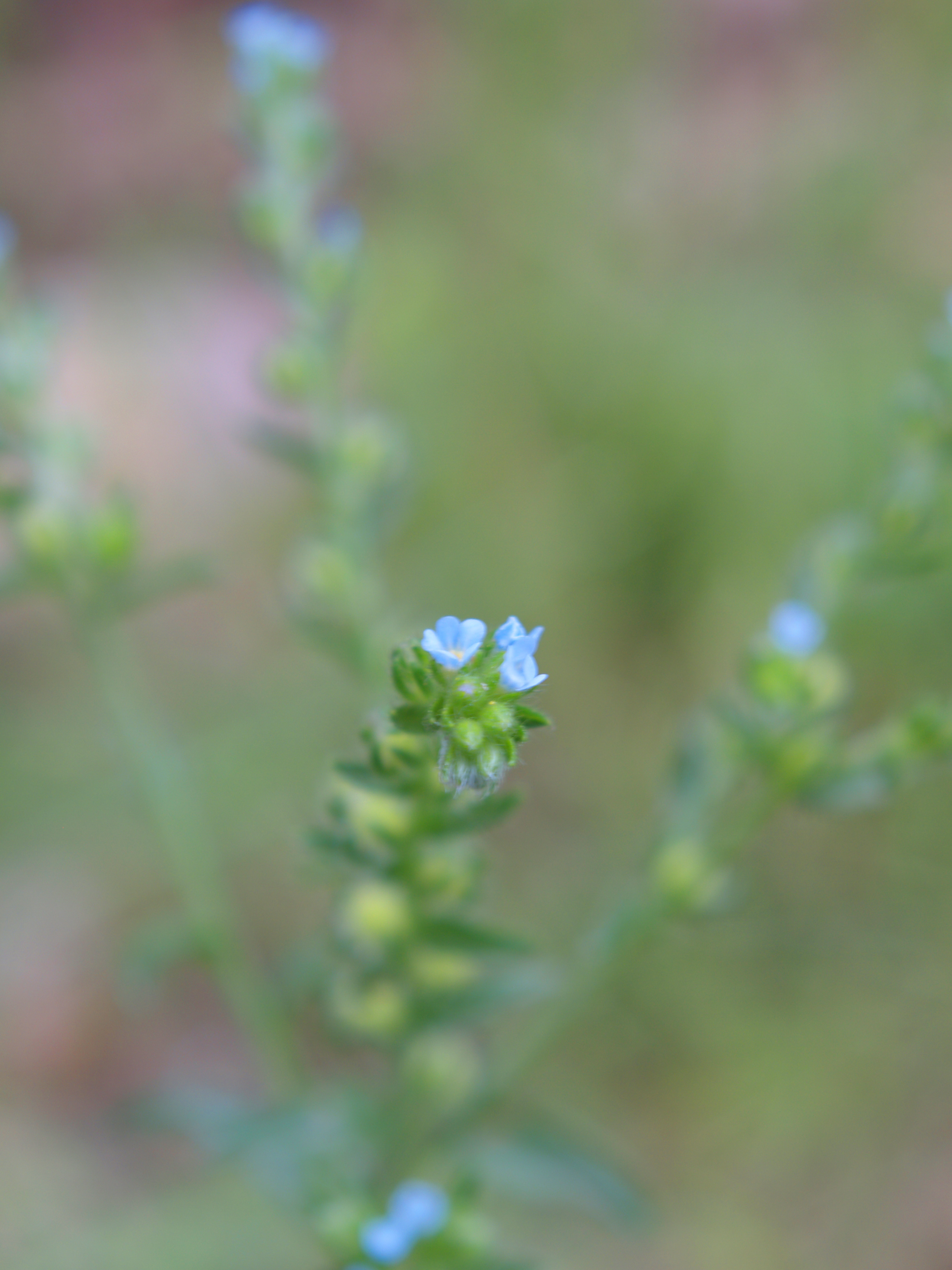

Conservation status
- Secure (NatureServe)

Scientific classification
- Kingdom: Plantae
- Clade: Tracheophytes
- Clade: Angiosperms
- Clade: Eudicots
- Clade: Asterids
- Order: Boraginales
- Family: Boraginaceae
- Genus: Hackelia
- Species: H. floribunda

Binomial name
- Hackelia floribunda (Lehm.) I.M.Johnst.

Synonyms
- Echinospermum deflexum var. floribundum (Lehm.) S.Watson; Echinospermum floribundum Lehm.; Hackelia leptophylla I.M.Johnst.; Hackelia scaberrima (Piper) Brand; Hackelia scaberrima var. angustata (Rydb.) Brand; Lappula angustata Rydb.; Lappula floribunda Greene; Lappula floribunda var. geisiana Jeps.; Lappula leptophylla Rydb.; Lappula scaberrima Piper

= Hackelia floribunda =

Species of flowering plant

Hackelia floribunda is a species of flowering plant known by the common names large-flowered stickseed, manyflower stickseed, and wild forget-me-not. It is part of the borage family.

== Description ==
Hackelia floribunda is a lush biennial or perennial herb with clusters of one to a few hairy stems reaching up to 90 centimetres (3 ft) tall. The leaves are up to 20 cm (8 in) long; only the lower ones have petioles. The leaves are smaller at the top.

From June to August, the coiled ends of the stems bear cyme inflorescences of blue flowers. The corollas are about 6 millimetres (1/4 in) wide; each flower has five lobes with petallike appendages at their bases.

The fruit is a tiny, mildly prickly nutlet.

=== Similar species ===
Hackelia micrantha has several stems and small prickles on the back of the nutlets. The prickles on the nutlet of H. floribunda help distinguish it from Myosotis (forget-me-nots).

== Distribution and habitat ==
The plant is native to much of the western half of North America, in southern Canada and the Midwestern and Western United States.

It is most often found in areas which are wet during the springtime, such as meadows, wetlands, and riparian areas.
