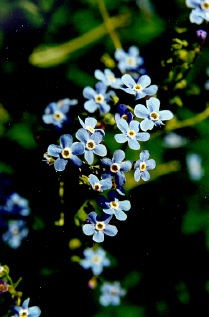

Conservation status
- Secure (NatureServe)

Scientific classification
- Kingdom: Plantae
- Clade: Tracheophytes
- Clade: Angiosperms
- Clade: Eudicots
- Clade: Asterids
- Order: Boraginales
- Family: Boraginaceae
- Genus: Hackelia
- Species: H. micrantha

Binomial name
- Hackelia micrantha (Eastw.) J.L.Gentry

Synonyms
- Hackelia jessicae

= Hackelia micrantha =

Species of flowering plant

Hackelia micrantha is a species of flowering plant in the borage family known by the common names Jessica sticktight and Jessica's stickseed.

== Distribution and habitat ==
It is native to western North America from British Columbia and Alberta, southeast through Montana into Colorado and Utah, and south to the Sierra Nevada in California and Nevada.

It grows at elevations of 1,200–3,500 metres (3,900–11,500 ft), including in the Rocky Mountains. It is native to meadows, shrubby slopes, open forests, and streambank habitats.

== Description ==
Hackelia micrantha is a lush perennial herb growing to heights of 30 centimetres (12 in) to over 1 metre (3.3 ft). Its erect stems are surrounded at the base by many oval-shaped to lance-shaped leaves, the longest over 20 centimetres (7.9 in) long.

The upper stems are generally leafless and hold cyme inflorescences of bright blue flowers. Each petite flower has five rounded lobes with a smaller petallike appendage at the base of each. The bloom period is June to August.

The fruit is a nutlet with pointed prickles.
