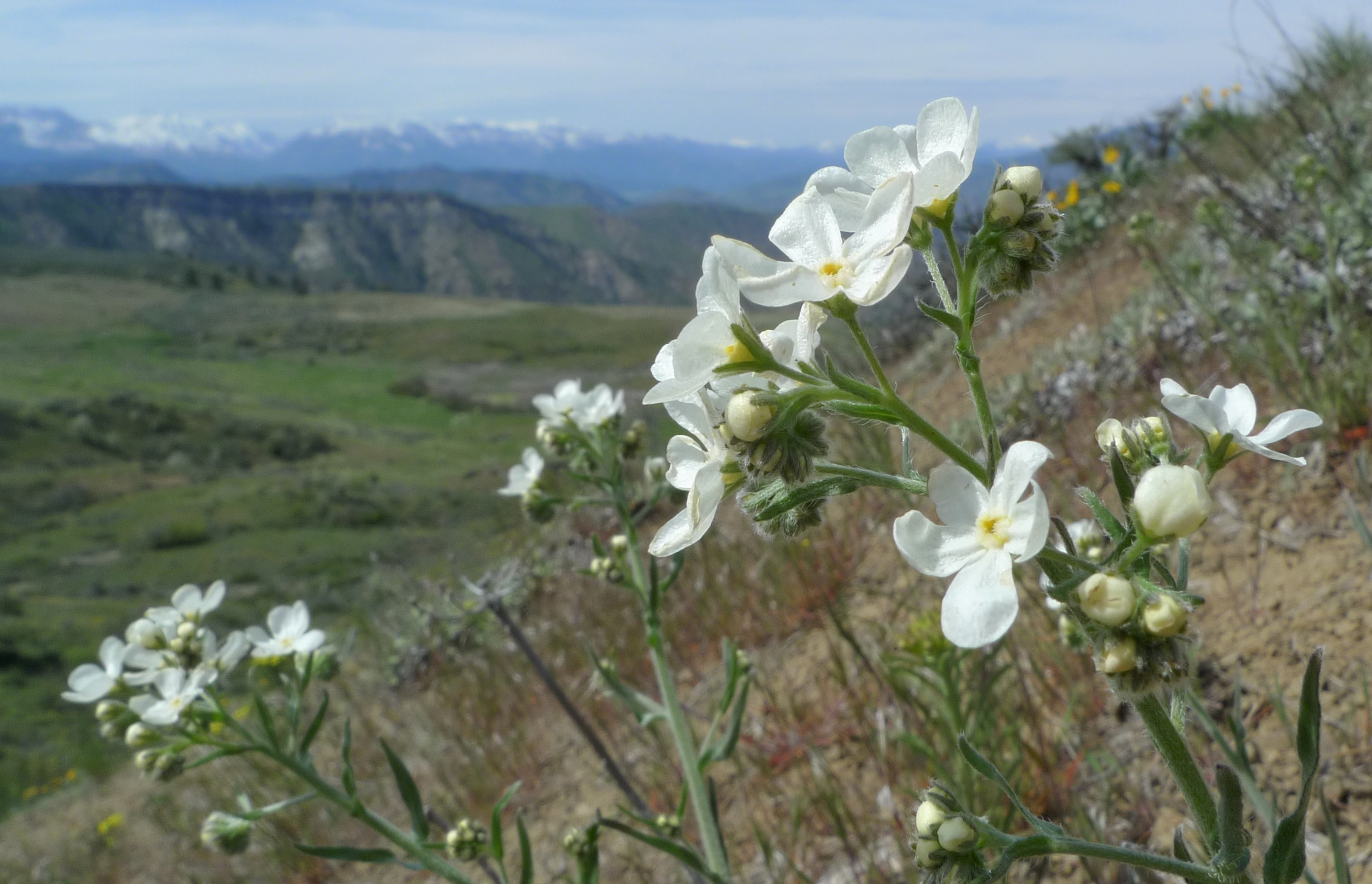
- Hackelia diffusa flowering near Wenatchee, Washington
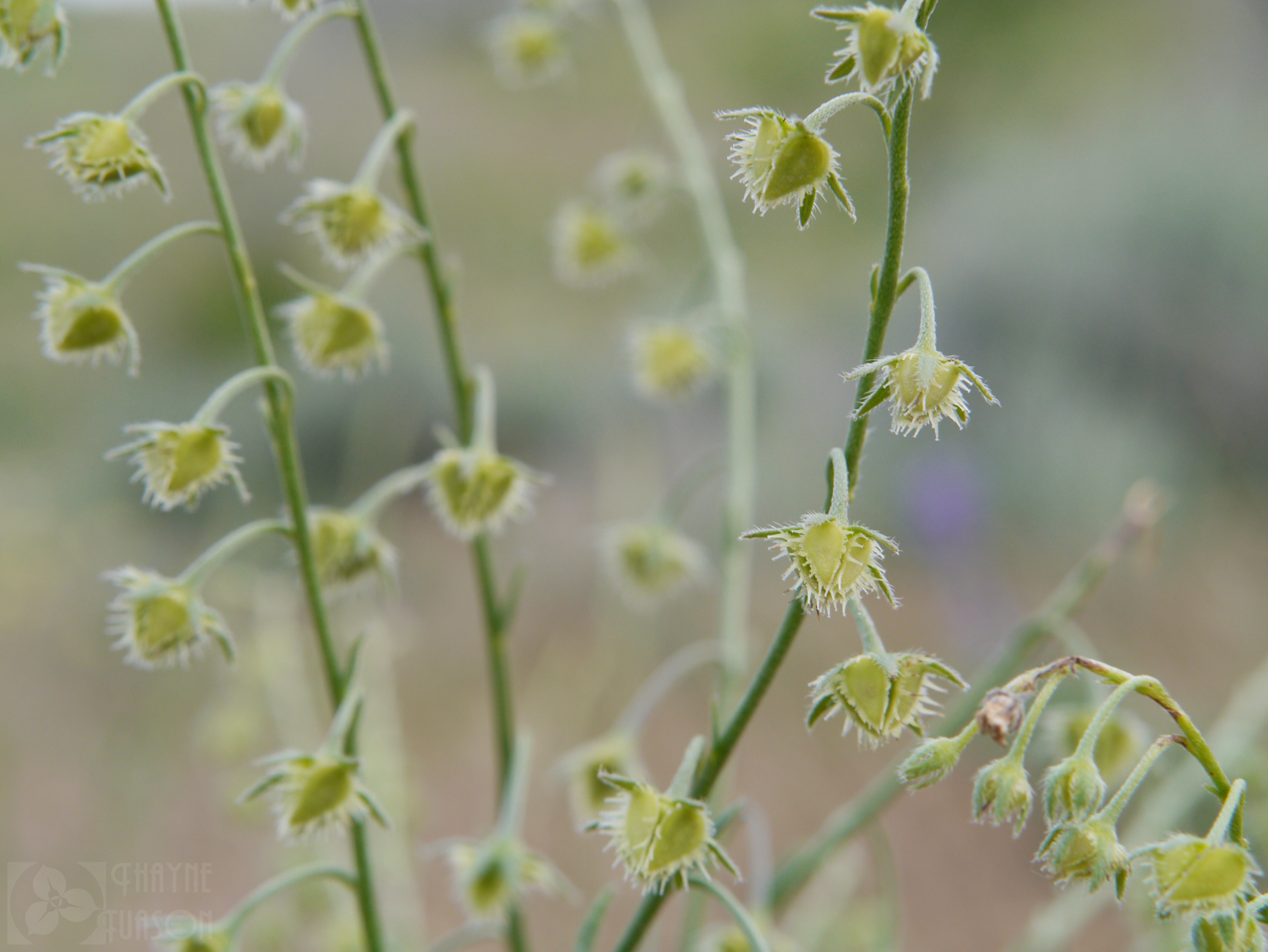
- Almost ripe nutlets of Hackelia diffusa var. arida

Scientific classification
- Kingdom: Plantae
- Clade: Tracheophytes
- Clade: Angiosperms
- Clade: Eudicots
- Clade: Asterids
- Order: Boraginales
- Family: Boraginaceae
- Genus: Hackelia
- Species: H. diffusa

Binomial name
- Hackelia diffusa (Lehm.) I.M.Johnst.

Synonyms
- Cynoglossospermum diffusum (Douglas ex Lehm.) Kuntze; Echinospermum diffusum Douglas ex Lehm.

= Hackelia diffusa =

Species of flowering plant

Hackelia diffusa is a species of flowering plant in the family Boraginaceae known by the common name spreading stickseed.

== Distribution and habitat ==
The plant grows east of the Cascades in British Columbia, Washington and Oregon. Its habitats include rocky cliffs, talus slopes, and shrub steppe.

== Description ==
Hackelia diffusa is a perennial herb from 20 to 70 cm (7.9 to 28 in) tall. The lower part of the plant is covered with spreading, stiff hairs, while the upper has appressed hairs.

It has an inflorescence of false-racemes with numerous white flowers that have a yellow center. The boom period is from May to July. The fruits are clusters of four nutlets that have marginal and intramarginal prickles.
