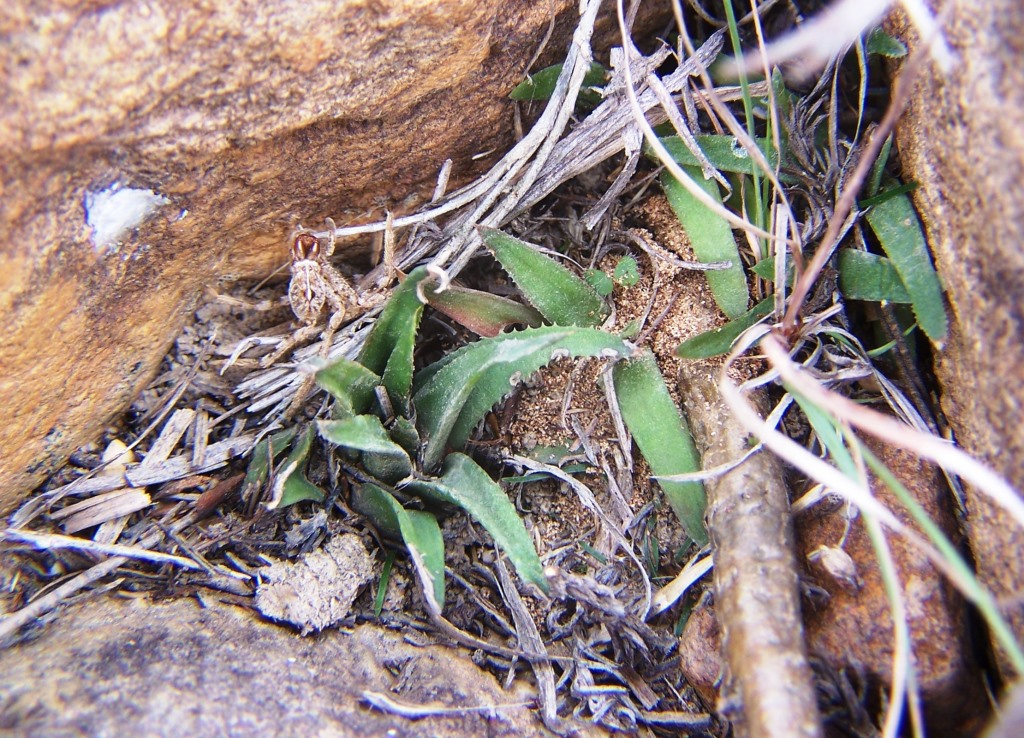
- H. floribunda in native habitat

Scientific classification
- Kingdom: Plantae
- Clade: Tracheophytes
- Clade: Angiosperms
- Clade: Monocots
- Order: Asparagales
- Family: Asphodelaceae
- Subfamily: Asphodeloideae
- Genus: Haworthia
- Species: H. floribunda

Binomial name
- Haworthia floribunda Poelln.

= Haworthia floribunda =

Species of flowering plant

Haworthia floribunda is a species of succulent plant in the genus Haworthia native to the Cape Province of South Africa. It grows in rosettes with dark green, lanceolate leaves that curve or twist outward. The leaves may be smooth or, in H. floribunda var. dentata, have small teeth.
