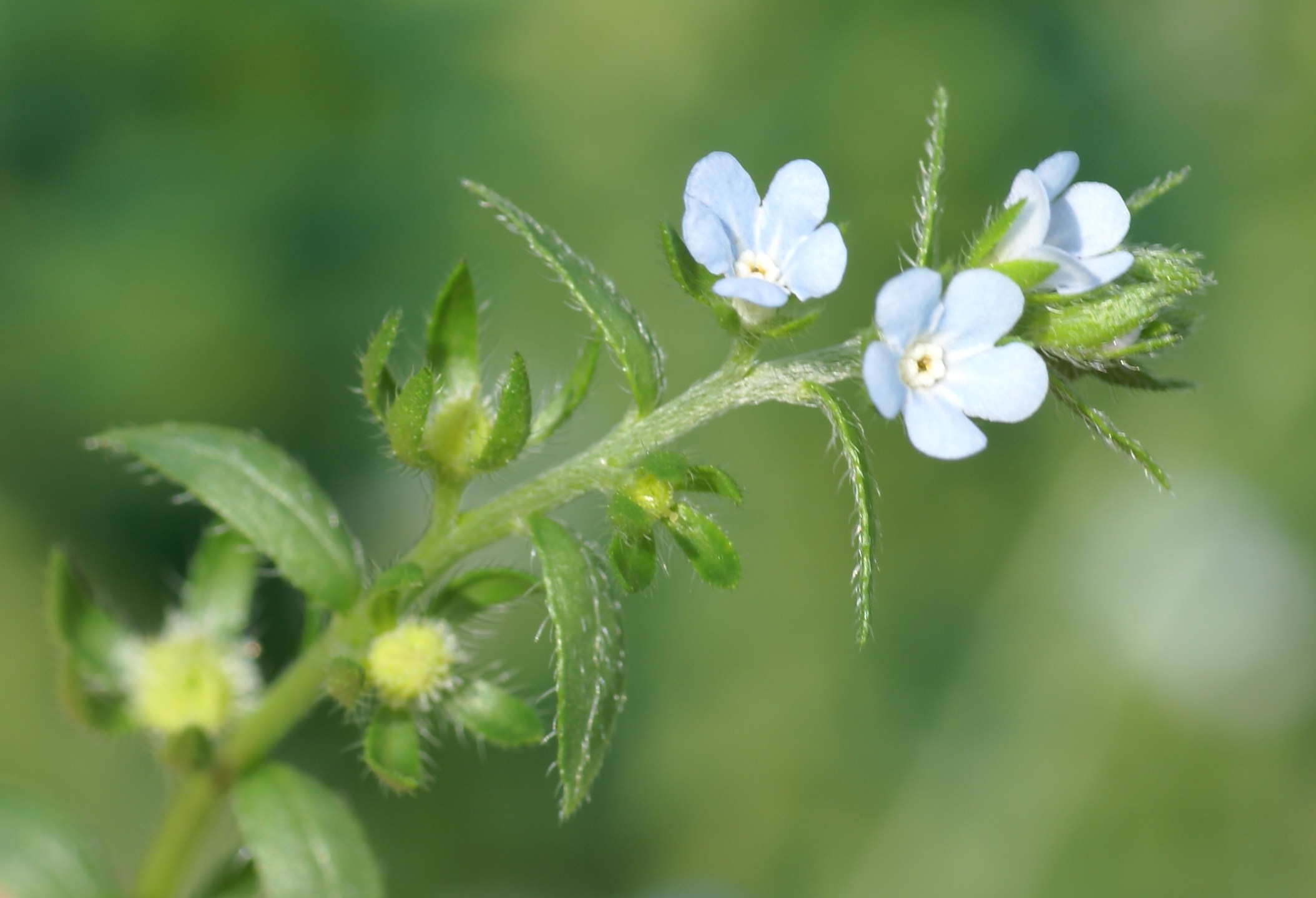

Scientific classification
- Kingdom: Plantae
- Clade: Tracheophytes
- Clade: Angiosperms
- Clade: Eudicots
- Clade: Asterids
- Order: Boraginales
- Family: Boraginaceae
- Genus: Lappula
- Species: L. squarrosa

Binomial name
- Lappula squarrosa (Retz.) Dumort.

= Lappula squarrosa =

Species of flowering plant

Lappula squarrosa is a species of flowering plant in the borage family known by several common names, including European stickseed, bur forget-me-not, bluebur, and bristly sheepbur. It is native to Europe and Asia, where it is common, and it is an introduced species in much of North America and Africa. It is well known as a noxious weed where it is naturalized and also in many parts of its native range. This is an annual herb producing an erect stem often with sprays of many long, bending branches, its form varying in different regions and climates. The plant may approach a meter in height. The stems are lined with linear to oval leaves up to 5 centimeters long and coated in whitish hairs, and the herbage emits a scent generally considered unpleasant. The inflorescence is a long, leafy raceme of tiny flowers near the ends of the branches. Each flower is 2 to 4 millimeters wide with five light blue corolla lobes. White-flowered plants are occasionally seen. The fruit is a cluster of four nutlets which are coated in hooked prickles. The seeds are dispersed when the prickles get caught on animal coats and human clothing, and when they are moved by wind.

This plant grows easily in a wide range of habitat types, including agricultural fields, roadsides, gravel beds, and rocky waste places. It thrives in overgrazed pastures.
