= List of butterflies of Maine =

This is a tentative list of butterflies found in Maine, a state in the United States.

== Brush-footed butterflies (Nymphalidae) ==
=== Admirals and relatives (Limenitidinae) ===
- 'Astyanax' red-spotted purple (Limenitis arthemis astyanax)
- Red-spotted purple (Limenitis arthemis)
- Viceroy (Limenitis archippus)
- White admiral (Limenitis arthemis arthemis) *

=== Longwings (Heliconiinae) ===
- Aphrodite fritillary (Speyeria aphrodite)
- Arctic fritillary (Boloria chariclea)
- Atlantis fritillary (Speyeria atlantis)
- Bog fritillary (Boloria eunomia)
- Great spangled fritillary (Speyeria cybele) *
- Meadow fritillary (Boloria bellona)
- Regal fritillary (Speyeria idalia)
- Silver-bordered fritillary (Boloria selene)
- Variegated fritillary (Euptoieta claudia)

=== Milkweed butterflies (Danainae) ===
- Monarch (Danaus plexippus) *

=== Snouts (Libytheinae) ===
- American snout (Libytheana carinenta)

=== True brushfoots (Nymphalinae) ===
- American lady (Vanessa virginiensis)
- Baltimore (Euphydryas phaeton)
- Common buckeye (Junonia coenia)
- Compton tortoiseshell (Nymphalis vaualbum)
- Eastern comma (Polygonia comma)
- Gray comma (Polygonia progne)
- Green comma (Polygonia faunus)
- Harris' checkerspot (Chlosyne harrisii)
- Hoary comma (Polygonia gracilis)
- Milbert's tortoiseshell (Aglais milberti)
- Mourning cloak (Nymphalis antiopa) *
- Northern crescent (Phyciodes cocyta)
- Painted lady (Vanessa cardui)
- Pearl crescent (Phyciodes tharos)
- Question mark (Polygonia interrogationis)
- Red admiral (Vanessa atalanta) *
- Satyr comma (Polygonia satyrus)
- Silvery checkerspot (Chlosyne nycteis)
- Tawny crescent (Phyciodes batesii)

== Parnassians and swallowtails (Papilionidae) ==
=== Swallowtails (Papilioninae) ===
- Black swallowtail (Papilio polyxenes) *
- Canadian tiger swallowtail (Papilio canadensis)
- Eastern tiger swallowtail (Papilio glaucus) *
- Giant swallowtail (Papilio cresphontes)
- Pipevine swallowtail (Battus philenor)
- Spicebush swallowtail (Papilio troilus)

== Skippers (Hesperiidae) ==
=== Spread-wing skippers (Pyrginae) ===
- Common sootywing (Pholisora catullus)
- Dreamy duskywing (Erynnis icelus)
- Juvenal's duskywing (Erynnis juvenalis)
- Northern cloudywing (Thorybes pylades)
- Persius duskywing (Erynnis persius)
- Silver-spotted skipper (Epargyreus clarus)
- Sleepy duskywing (Erynnis brizo)
- Southern cloudywing (Thorybes bathyllus)

== Gossamer-winged butterflies (Lycaenidae) ==
- Spring azure (Celastrina ladon) *

=== Harvesters (Miletinae) ===
- Harvester (Feniseca tarquinius)

* most common species
