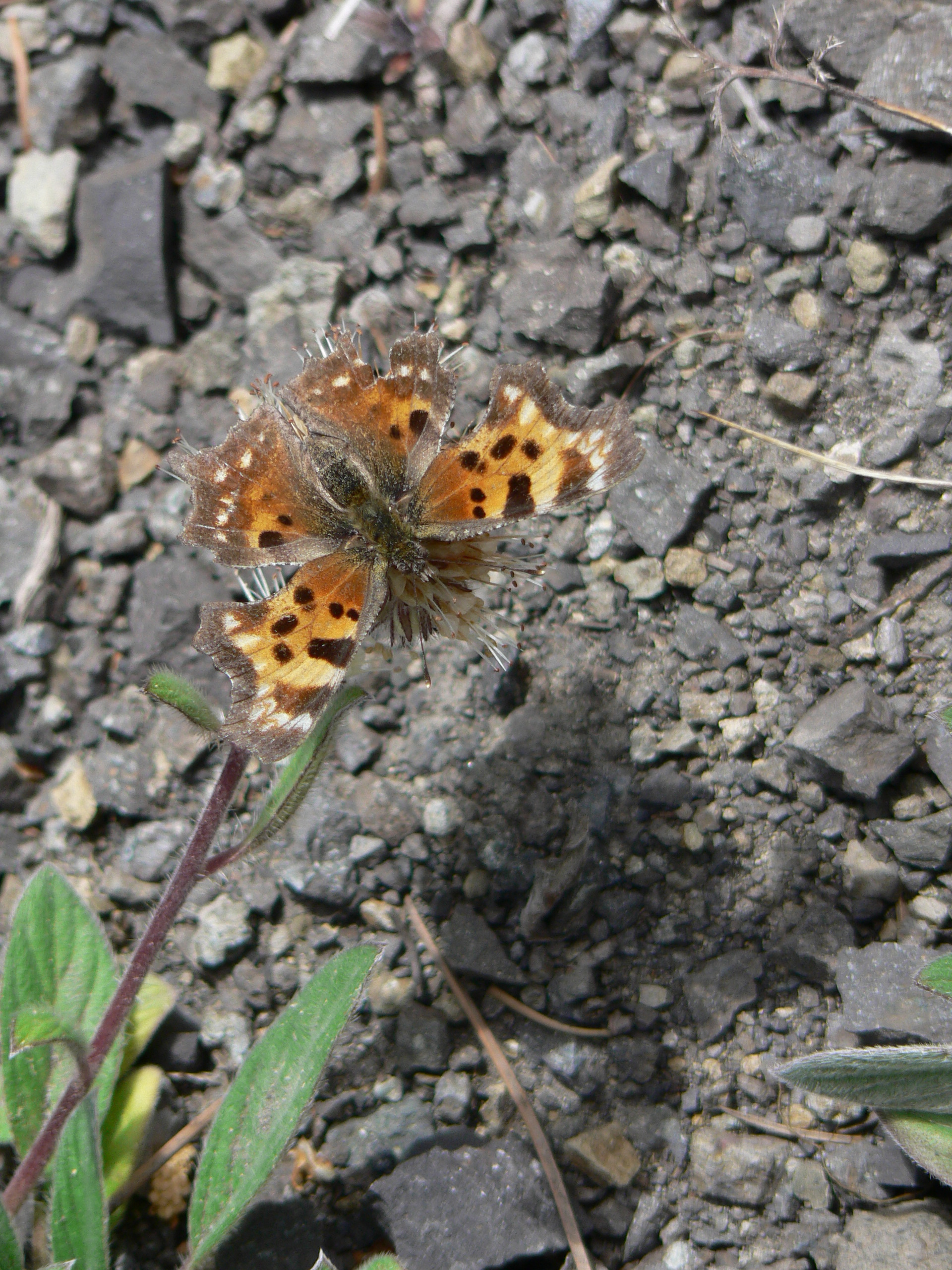
- In Washington state, U.S.

Scientific classification
- Kingdom: Animalia
- Phylum: Arthropoda
- Clade: Pancrustacea
- Class: Insecta
- Order: Lepidoptera
- Family: Nymphalidae
- Genus: Polygonia
- Species: P. oreas

Binomial name
- Polygonia oreas (W.H. Edwards, 1869)

Synonyms
- Nymphalis oreas; Grapta oreas; Grapta silvius

= Polygonia oreas =

Oreas comma

Species of butterfly

Polygonia oreas, the oreas comma, is a butterfly of the family Nymphalidae. It is found in North America in the mountains from southern British Columbia and southwestern Alberta to northern California.

The wingspan is 42–52 mm. The butterfly flies from June to October depending on the location. Its habitats include coastal redwood forests and mountain conifer forests.

The larvae feed on Ribes species. Adults feed on tree sap and rotting fruit; they rarely feed on flower nectar.

== Similar species ==
- Green comma (P. faunus)
- Grey comma (P. progne)
