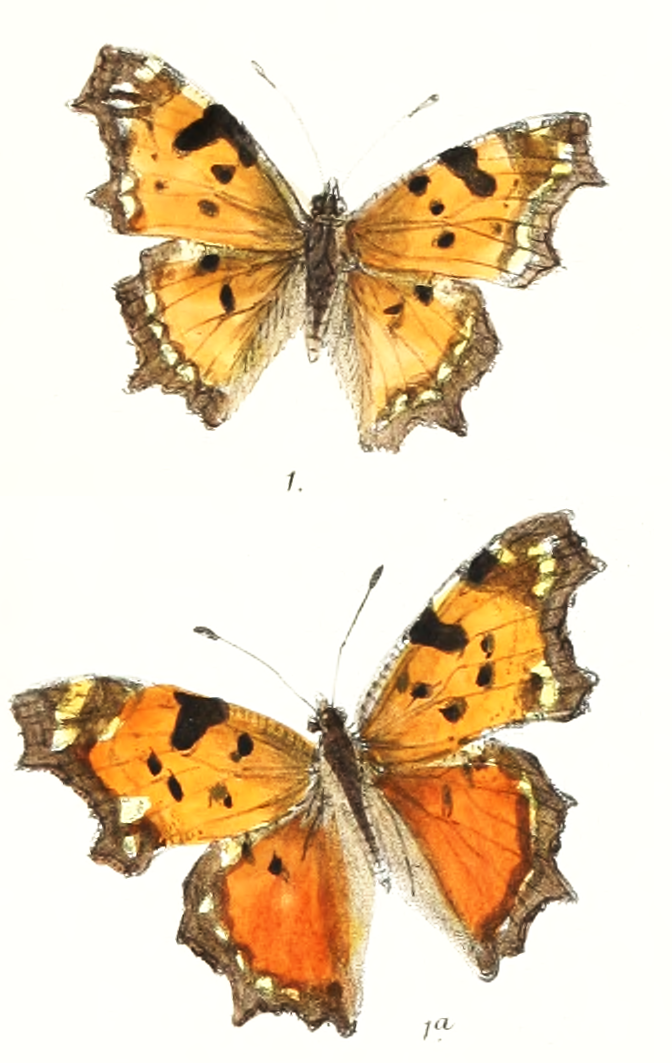

Scientific classification
- Domain: Eukaryota
- Kingdom: Animalia
- Phylum: Arthropoda
- Class: Insecta
- Order: Lepidoptera
- Family: Nymphalidae
- Genus: Polygonia
- Species: P. interposita

Binomial name
- Polygonia interposita (Staudinger, 1881)

Synonyms
- Vanessa (Grapta) c-album var. interposita Staudinger, 1881; Nymphalis interposita; Polygonia chitralica Evans, 1932; Polygonia interposita cognata Moore, 1892

= Polygonia interposita =

Species of butterfly

Polygonia interposita is a butterfly of the family Nymphalidae. It is found from Ghissar to the Altai Mountains, north-western China, the Himalayas and Mongolia. The habitat consists of gorges and slopes up to 2,500 meters above sea level.

Adults are on wing from March to October in two generations per year.

== Subspecies ==
- Polygonia interposita interposita (Ghissar-Darvaz, Pamirs-Alai, Tian-Shan, Saur, Tarbagatai, Dzhungarsky Alatau, Altai)
- Polygonia interposita adya Churkin, 2003 (Mongolia)
- Polygonia interposita tibetana Elwes, 1888 (north-western China)
