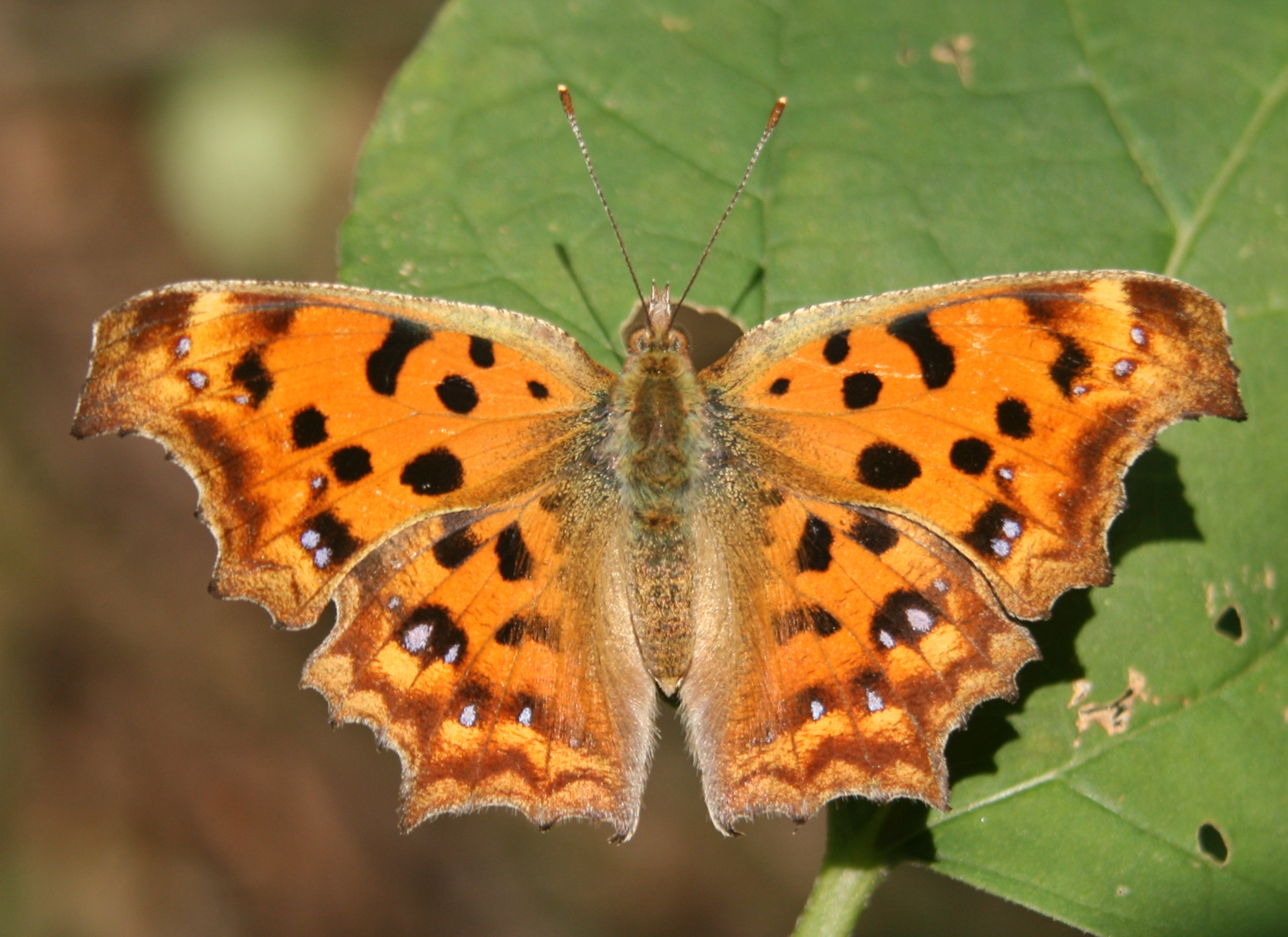

Scientific classification
- Kingdom: Animalia
- Phylum: Arthropoda
- Class: Insecta
- Order: Lepidoptera
- Family: Nymphalidae
- Genus: Polygonia
- Species: P. c-aureum

Binomial name
- Polygonia c-aureum (Linnaeus, 1758)

Synonyms
- Nymphalis c-aureum

= Polygonia c-aureum =

Asian comma

Species of butterfly

Polygonia c-aureum, the Asian comma, is a middle-size butterfly found in Japan (from Hokkaidō to Tanegashima), Korean Peninsula, China, Taiwan, and Indochina.

== Appearance ==
It has a wingspan of 27 mm. Wings are orange with black dots. The undersides of the wings is mottled brown (tree bark like) with a shiny comma mark on the center of the hindwing. The main difference with other comma species is that it has blueish markings on the bottom of its hindwing.

== Ecology ==
P. c-aureum is common in suburban areas. It is not a threatened species. The larvae of the species feed on plants such as: Humulus japonicus, the Japanese hop.
