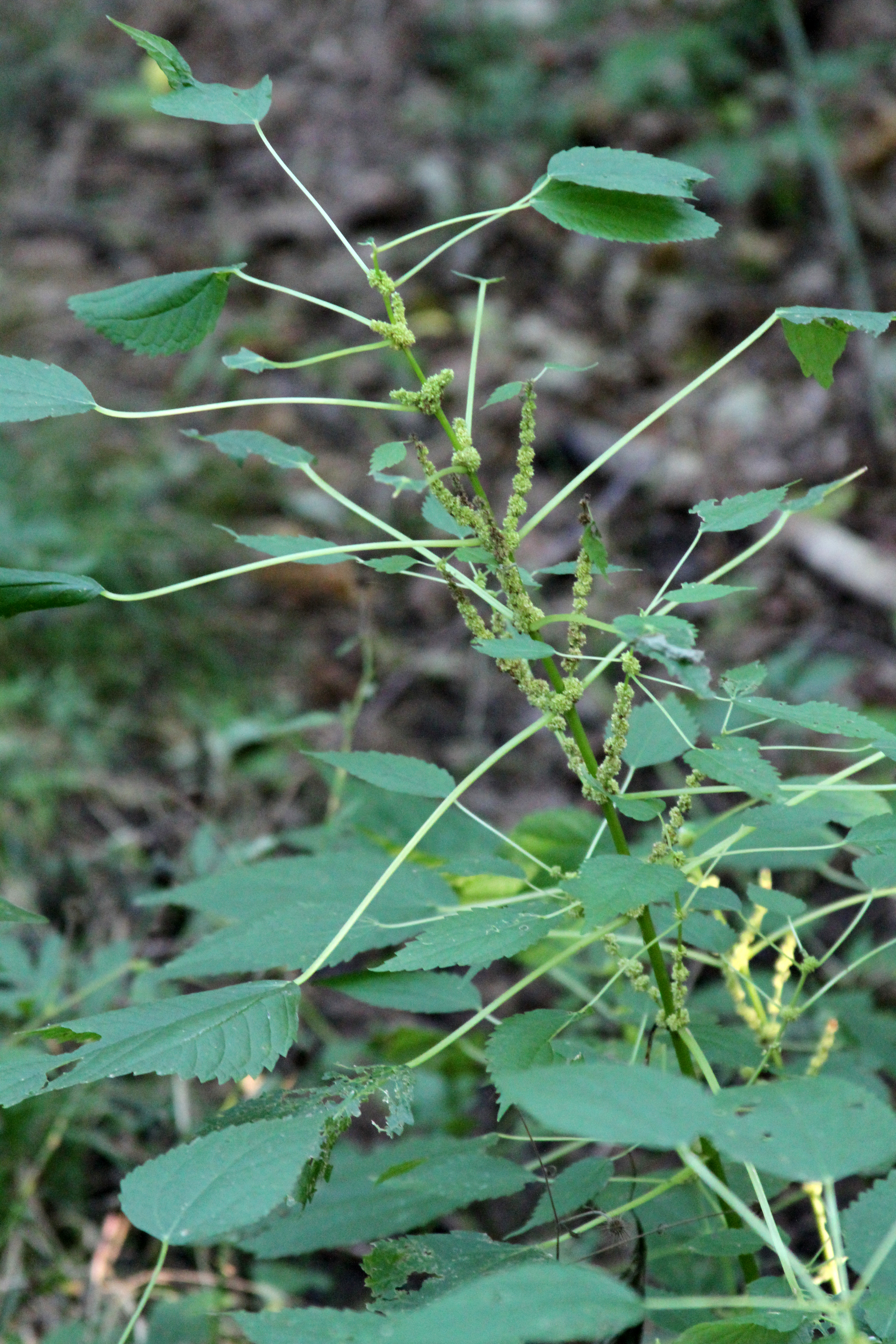

Conservation status
- Secure (NatureServe)

Scientific classification
- Kingdom: Plantae
- Clade: Tracheophytes
- Clade: Angiosperms
- Clade: Eudicots
- Clade: Rosids
- Order: Rosales
- Family: Urticaceae
- Genus: Boehmeria
- Species: B. cylindrica

Binomial name
- Boehmeria cylindrica (L.) Swartz

Synonyms
- Urtica cylindrica L.; Boehmeria drummondiana Wedd.; Boehmeria scabra (Porter) Small

= Boehmeria cylindrica =

False nettle

Species of flowering plant

Boehmeria cylindrica, with common names false nettle and bog hemp, is an herb in the family Urticaceae. It is widespread in eastern North America and the Great Plains from New Brunswick to Florida to Texas to Nebraska, with scattered reports of isolated populations in New Mexico, Arizona, and Utah, as well as in Bermuda, Mexico, Central America, the West Indies, and South America.

The plant is an herb or subshrub up to 160 cm (63 in) tall, usually monoecious, but rarely dioecious. Leaves are usually opposite, though occasionally alternate, and the inflorescence is a spike with a tuft of small bracts at the apex.

== Description ==
B. cylindrica is a deciduous and occasionally dioecious growing plant. The plant grows to be 0.5 to 1.0 m (1 ft 8 in to 3 ft 3 in) in height with opposite leaf arrangement. Spike-like hairs are in the leaf axils. Leaves are ovate in shape and 6–8 cm (2.4–3.1 in) in length and 3–4 cm (1.2–1.6 in) in width. Flowers are green or greenish white in color and the flowers appear from the axils of the upper leaves. Small, oval-shaped seeds are covered in small, hook-like hairs. Once mature, the seeds are dark brown. The inflorescences resemble spikes and can be from 1–3 cm (0.39–1.18 in) in length. Male and female flowers typically grow on separate plants. Male flowers are more prominently distributed among the spikes in bunches. The female flowers are less continuously distributed along the spikes. B. cylindrica does not have the stinging hairs typical of other members of the nettle family.

== Taxonomy ==
Some of the synonyms and intraspecific taxa are: Boehmeria austrina Small, Boehmeria cylindrica (L.) Sw. var. drummondiana (Weddell) Weddell, and Boehmeria cylindrica (L.) Sw. var. scabra Porter.

== Distribution ==
B. cylindrica can be found across the North American continent into Central and South America. It is native to northeastern Canada through the majority of the United States from Maine to Florida and stretching towards South Dakota to California.

=== Habitat ===
B. cylindrica can be found in wet to mesic deciduous woodland habitats. The plant flourishes the most in floodplain and bottomland areas.

== Ecology ==
B. cylindrica is wind pollinated, so plants are fertilized by pollen carried by the wind. Thus, the flowers do not attract many insects. Larvae of the fly Neolasioptera boehmeriae, form small galls in the shape of spindles. Flowering season for B. cylindrica is during the summer to fall. During flowering season, pollen acts as an allergen to some. It is a larval host to the eastern comma, the question mark, and the red admiral. It also is a host for the false spider mite in North America.

== Etymology ==
The generic name Boehmeria honors the German botanist, Georg Rudolf Boehmer (1723-1803). The specific name cylindrica is based on its generally cylindrical spikes located in the leaf axils.
