= Polygonia undina =

Scientific classification
- Domain: Eukaryota
- Kingdom: Animalia
- Phylum: Arthropoda
- Class: Insecta
- Order: Lepidoptera
- Family: Nymphalidae
- Genus: Polygonia
- Species: P. undina

Binomial name
- Polygonia undina (Grum-Grshimailo, 1890)

Synonyms
- Vanessa egea undina Grum-Grshimailo, 1890; Nymphalis undina

Species of butterfly

Polygonia undina is a butterfly of the family Nymphalidae first described by Grigory Grum-Grshimailo in 1890. It is found from Ghissar-Darvaz to the Pamirs-Alai and Tian-Shan in north-western China and the Himalayas.

== Taxonomy ==
It was originally treated as a subspecies of Polygonia egea, but phylogenetic analysis with genetic data indicated that it deserves species status.
