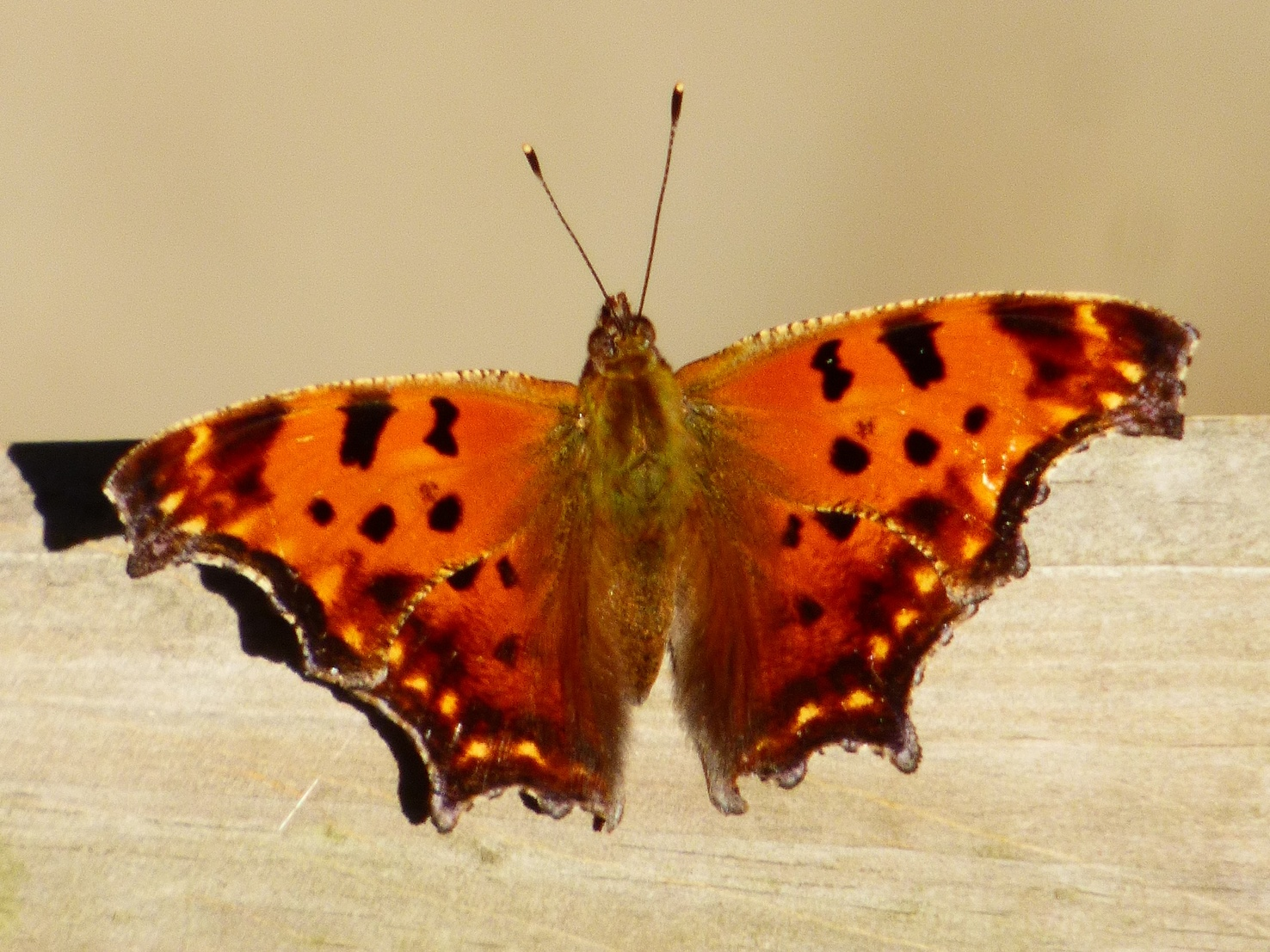

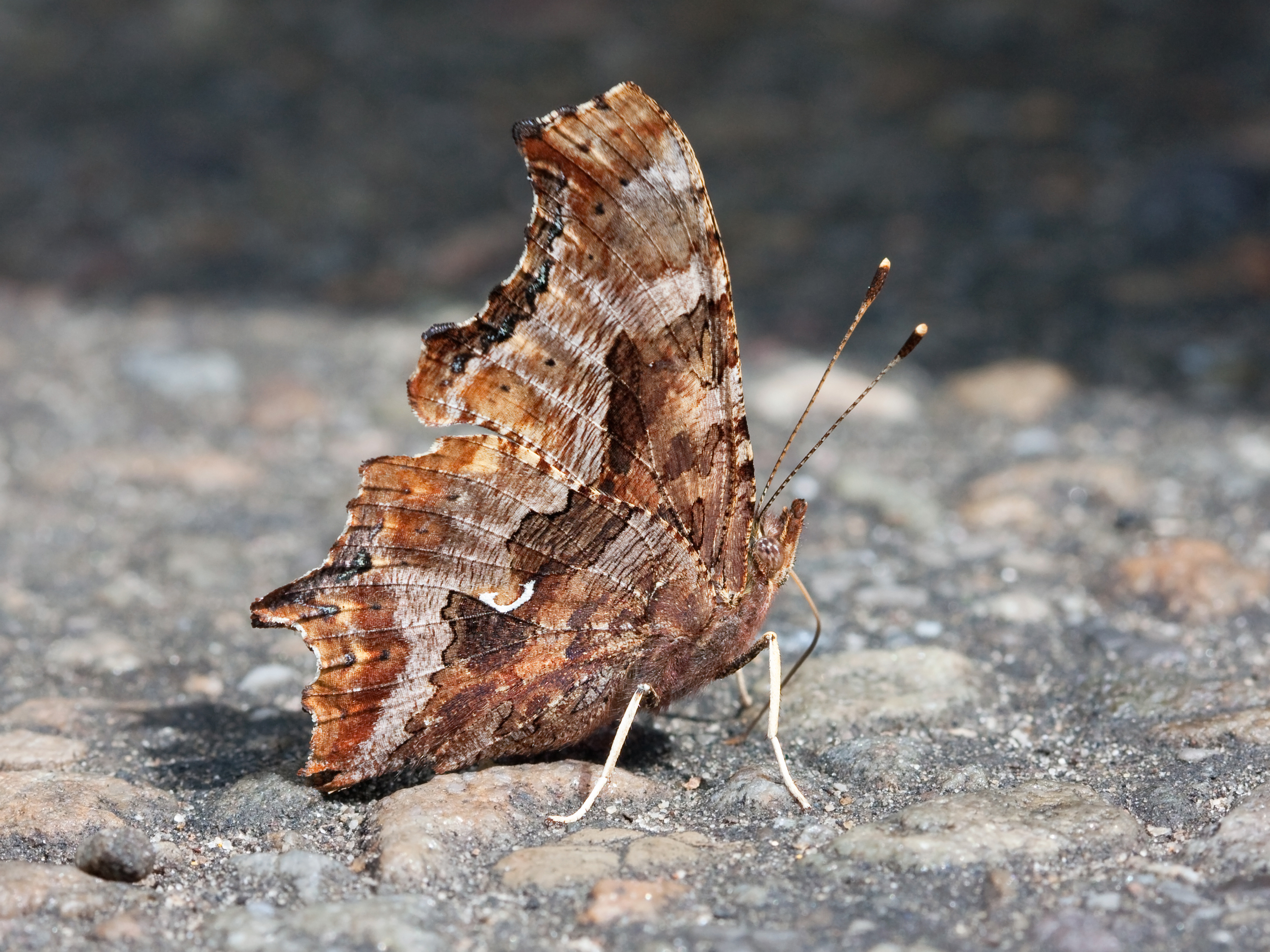

Conservation status
- Secure (NatureServe)

Scientific classification
- Kingdom: Animalia
- Phylum: Arthropoda
- Clade: Pancrustacea
- Class: Insecta
- Order: Lepidoptera
- Family: Nymphalidae
- Genus: Polygonia
- Species: P. comma

Binomial name
- Polygonia comma (Harris, 1862)
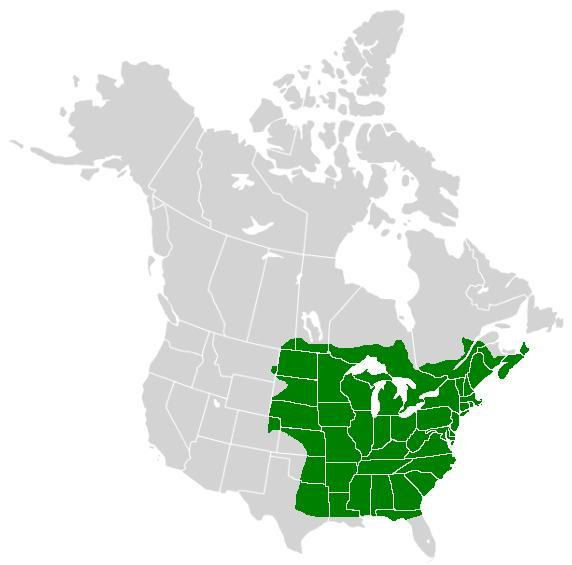
- Range map showing distribution of the eastern comma

Synonyms
- Nymphalis comma

= Polygonia comma =

Eastern comma

Species of butterfly

Polygonia comma, the eastern comma, is a North American butterfly in the family Nymphalidae, subfamily Nymphalinae.

== Description ==
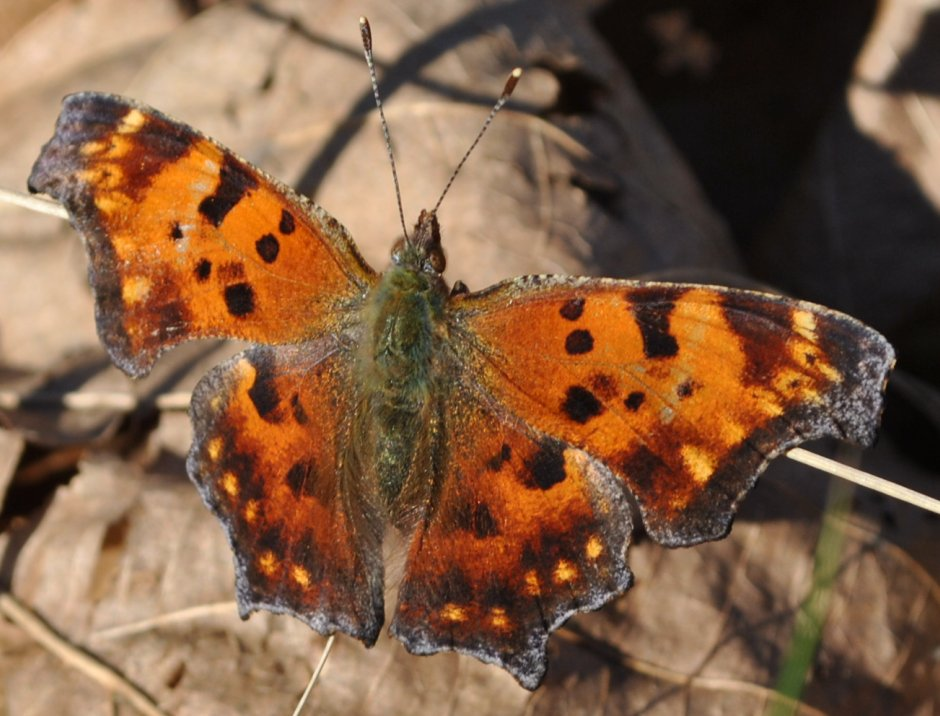
Upperside of wings

This butterfly is seasonally variable. The upperside of the summer form's hindwings are all black, whereas the winter forms hindwings are reddish orange. The underside of both forms is striped with dark and light brown. There is a silvery comma mark in the middle of the hindwing in both forms. Its wingspan is 4.5–6.4 cm (1.8–2.5 in).

== Habitat ==
The eastern comma may be spotted in woods near rivers, ponds, marshes, swamps, and other water sources.

== Nectar plants ==
This butterfly seldom visits flowers, but rather feeds on sap, rotting fruit, salts and minerals from puddling, and dung.

== Host plants ==
Caterpillars feed on paper birch (Betula papyrifera), false nettle (Boehmeria cylindrica), hackberry (Celtis occidentalis), hops (Humulus), wood nettle (Laportea canadensis), currants and gooseberries (Ribes spp.), basswood (Tilia americana), American elm (Ulmus americana), nettle (Urtica), and clearweed (Pilea pumila).

== Life cycle ==
The green eggs are laid singly or in stacks under host plant leaves and stems. The spiny larva varies in color from pale green to yellow to white and to even black. The solitary larva feeds on leaves at night. Older larvae construct daytime leaf shelters by pulling a single leaf together with silk. The chrysalis is brown and covered with spines. Winter-form adults overwinter; some will also migrate south for the winter.

== Similar species ==
The dark form of comma is frequently confused with the dark form of the question mark (P. interrogationis), but the two can readily be distinguished by the shape of the comma mark on the underside. The pale form is easily confused with the satyr comma (P. satyrus), which usually occurs north and west of the eastern comma's range. They can be distinguished by the upperside color, which is orange brown in the comma and tawny yellowish brown in P. satyrus; by the underside pattern, which tends to be mottled in the comma but appears to be more longitudinally streaked in P. satyrus; and by the row of pale submarginal spots on the hindwing upperside, which tend to be separate and surrounded by dark shading in comma, but are larger and tend to run together into a pale band in P. satyrus.
