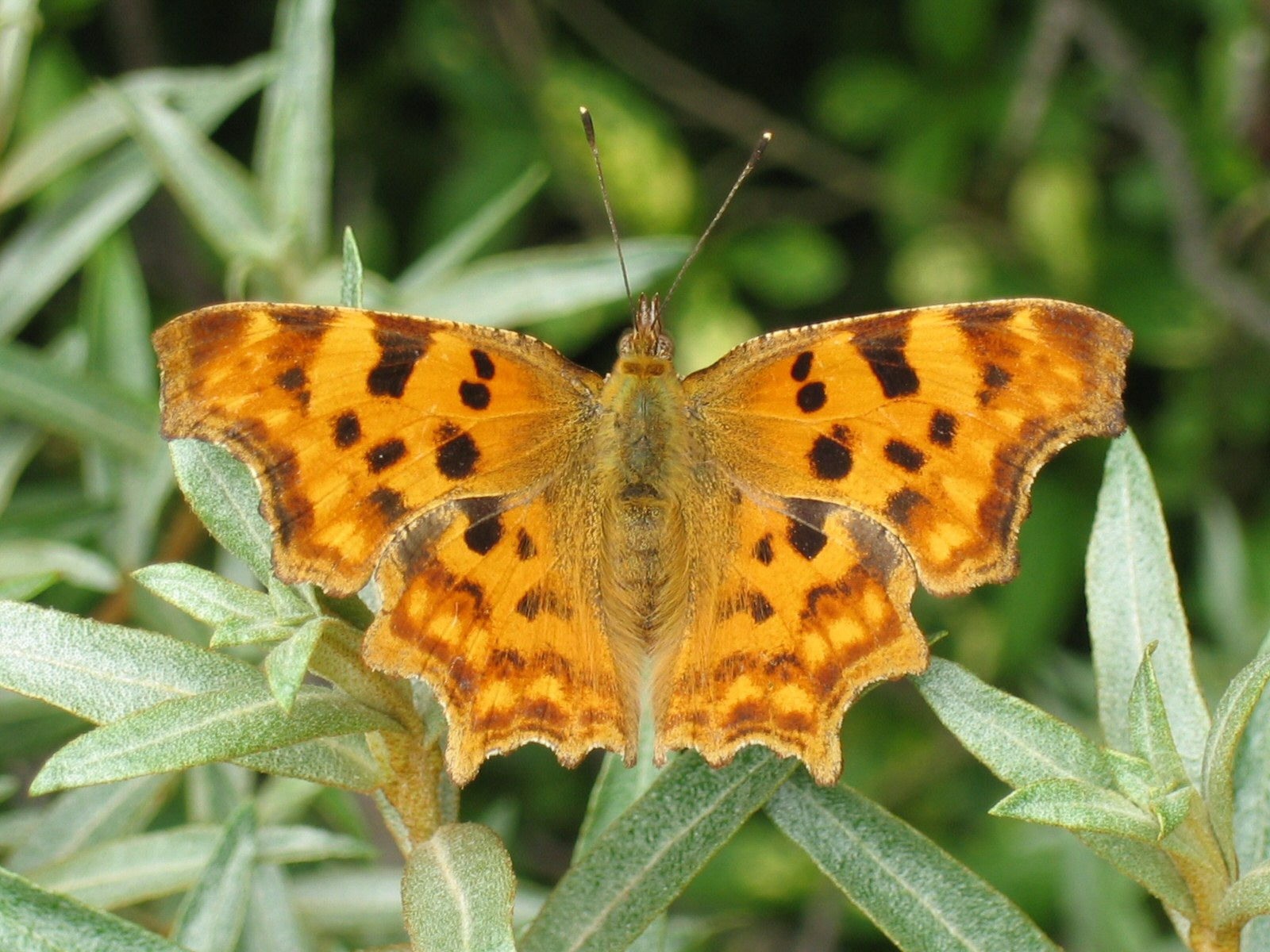
- Polygonia c-album

Scientific classification
- Domain: Eukaryota
- Kingdom: Animalia
- Phylum: Arthropoda
- Class: Insecta
- Order: Lepidoptera
- Family: Nymphalidae
- Tribe: Nymphalini
- Genus: Polygonia; Hübner, 1819

Species
- See text

= Polygonia =

Genus of insects

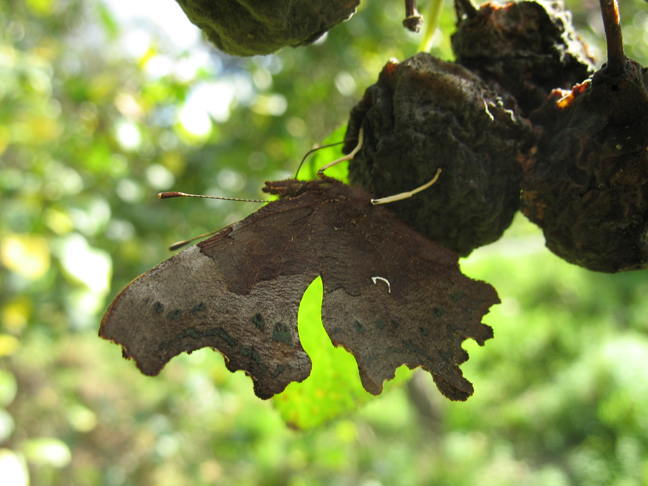
P. c-album showing angular wings and typical comma marking

Polygonia (from Greek πολύς - polys, "many" and γωνία - gōnia, "angle") is a genus of butterflies with a conspicuous white mark on the underside of each hindwing, hence the common name comma. They also have conspicuous angular notches on the outer edges of their forewings, hence the other common name anglewing butterflies. The related genus Nymphalis also includes some anglewing species; Polygonia is sometimes classified as a subgenus of Nymphalis.

Many members of Polygonia hibernate as adults. Species include:

- Polygonia c-album (Linnaeus, 1758) – comma
- Polygonia c-aureum (Linnaeus, 1758) – Asian comma
- Polygonia comma (Harris, 1842) – eastern comma
- Polygonia egea (Cramer, 1775) – southern comma
- Polygonia faunus (Edwards, 1862) – Faunus anglewing, Faunus comma, green comma
- Polygonia g-argenteum Doubleday & Hewitson, 1846 – Mexican anglewing
- Polygonia gigantea (Leech, 1883) – giant comma
- Polygonia gracilis (Grote & Robinson, 1867) – hoary comma
- Polygonia haroldii Dewitz, 1877 – spotless anglewing
- Polygonia interposita (Staudinger, 1881)
- Polygonia interrogationis (Fabricius, 1798) – question mark
- Polygonia oreas (Edwards, 1869) – oreas anglewing, oreas comma, sylvan anglewing
- Polygonia progne (Cramer, 1775) – grey comma, gray comma
- Polygonia satyrus (Edwards, 1869) – satyr anglewing, satyr comma
- Polygonia undina (Grum-Grshimailo, 1890)
- Polygonia zephyrus (Edwards, 1870) – zephyr comma
