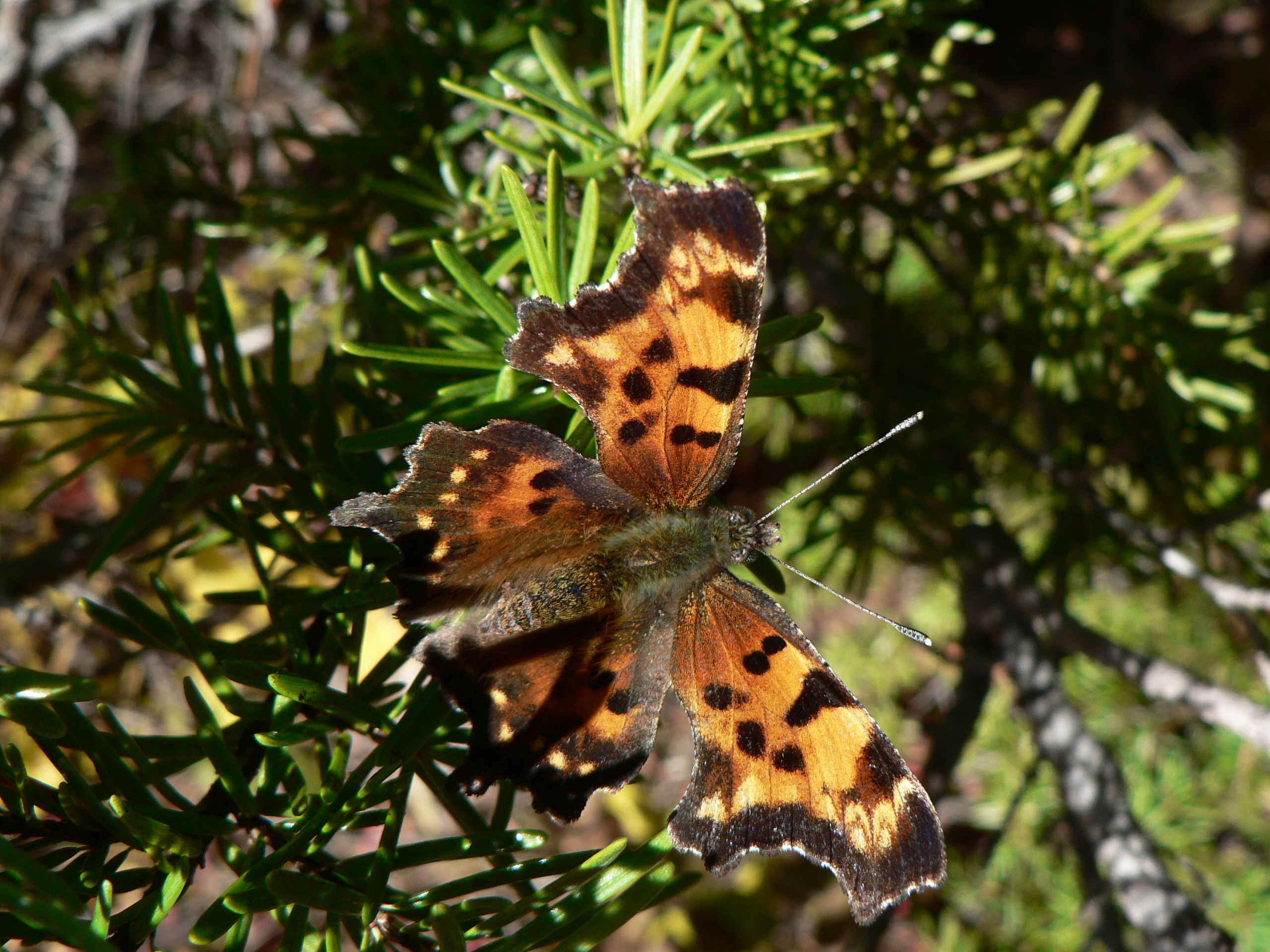
- On silver fir, Washington, U.S.

Conservation status
- Secure (NatureServe)

Scientific classification
- Kingdom: Animalia
- Phylum: Arthropoda
- Clade: Pancrustacea
- Class: Insecta
- Order: Lepidoptera
- Family: Nymphalidae
- Genus: Polygonia
- Species: P. faunus

Binomial name
- Polygonia faunus (W.H. Edwards, 1862)

Synonyms
- Nymphalis faunus; Grapta faunus Edwards, 1862; Polygonia virescens Scudder, 1875

= Polygonia faunus =

Green comma

Species of butterfly

Polygonia faunus, the green comma, is a butterfly of the family Nymphalidae.

== Subspecies ==
Subspecies include:

- Polygonia faunus smythi
- Polygonia faunus faunus
- Polygonia faunus articus
- Polygonia faunus rusticus (brown - west),
- Polygonia faunus hylas (gray - Rockies)

Some authors split Polygonia faunus into the above-mentioned subspecies, on the basis of differences in the color of the underside and their distribution. However most authors consider them as regional variants.

== Distribution and habitat ==
This species can be found in the boreal North America, from central Alaska south to central California and northern New Mexico. It is also present across the Great Lakes area to New England, the Maritimes and in the southern Appalachians. The green comma mainly occurs in forests, mountain woodlands, near streams and in canyons.

== Description ==
The wingspan of Polygonia faunus can reach about 45–64 mm. These usually uncommon butterflies show extremely ragged wing edges. They are geographically rather variable. The upperside of their wings is reddish brown with wide dark borders. The hindwing border contains a row of yellow spots. The underside of the wings is grey-brown, but the outer half is lighter, with greenish lichen-simulating submarginal spots in the males. Moreover, the hindwings have a L or a C-shaped silver spot in middle. In the females the wings are more uniform, dull gray below.

== Similar species ==
This species is most similar to the eastern comma (P. comma), but it can usually be distinguished by the irregular wing margins and the submarginal row of green spots on the underside. It is also strongly associated with the comma butterfly (Polygonia c-album) within the genus based on larval development analysis and synaptomorphies.

However the North American populations of Polygonia species can be distinguished from those of Polygonia c-album in the fact that they occur only in cooler regions, with only one brood and without seasonal dimorphism, while the latter species occurs in some milder regions, with more generations and distinct seasonal forms.

== Biology ==
Females lay eggs on the upper surface of the leaves of the host plants. The solitary larvae feed on a wide range of hosts, especially on upland willow (Salix humilis), Betula lenta, alder, Rhododendron occidentale, and Ribes species. Other recorded plants are Nettles (Urtica species), Hops (Humulus species), Elm (Ulmus species) and Azalea (Rhododendron species). These butterflies have one generation per year (univoltines) and fly from May to September depending on the location. Adults overwinter until the following Spring.

== Gallery ==
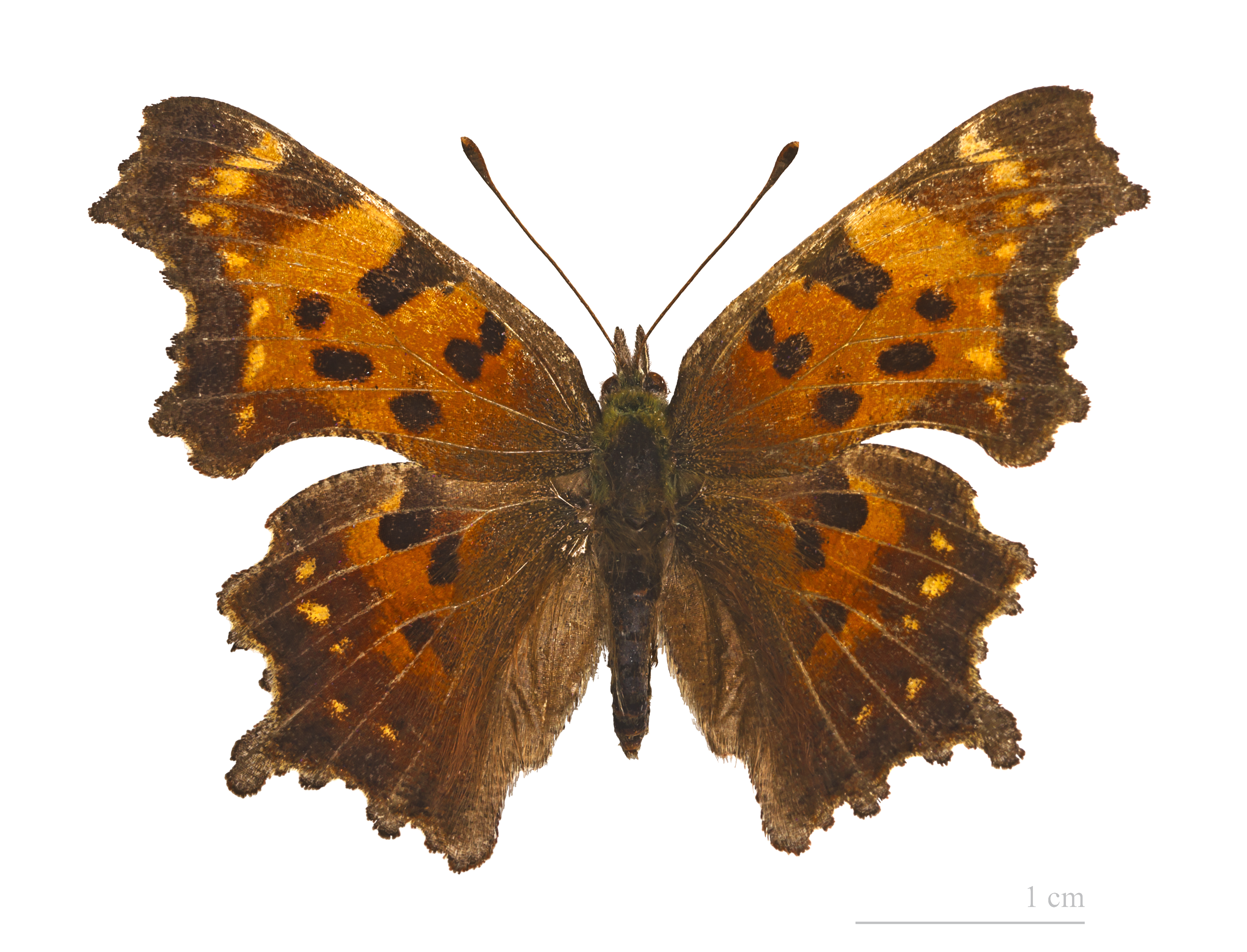
Male, dorsal side - MHNT

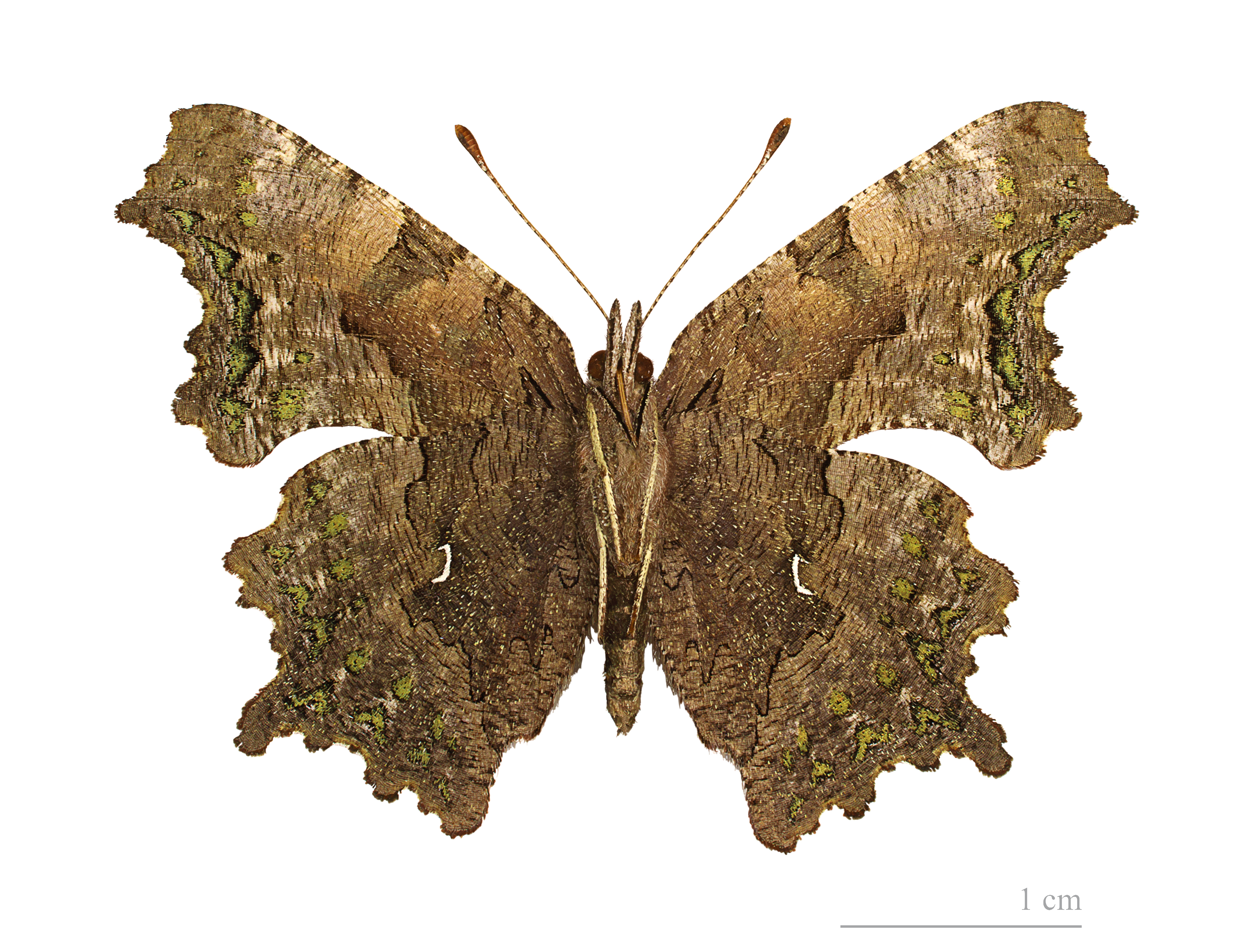
Male, ventral side - MHNT

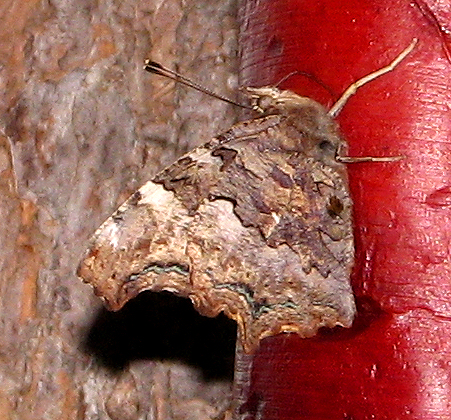
Female, Temagami, Ontario, Canada

P. faunus from Yellowstone. Video clip
