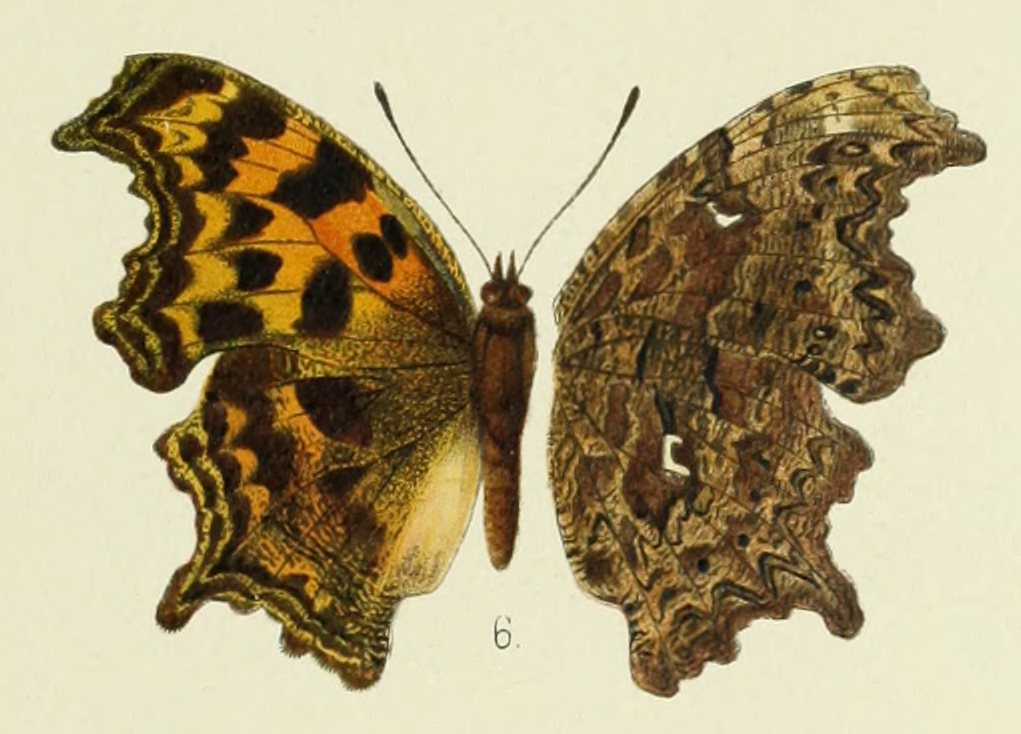
- Female
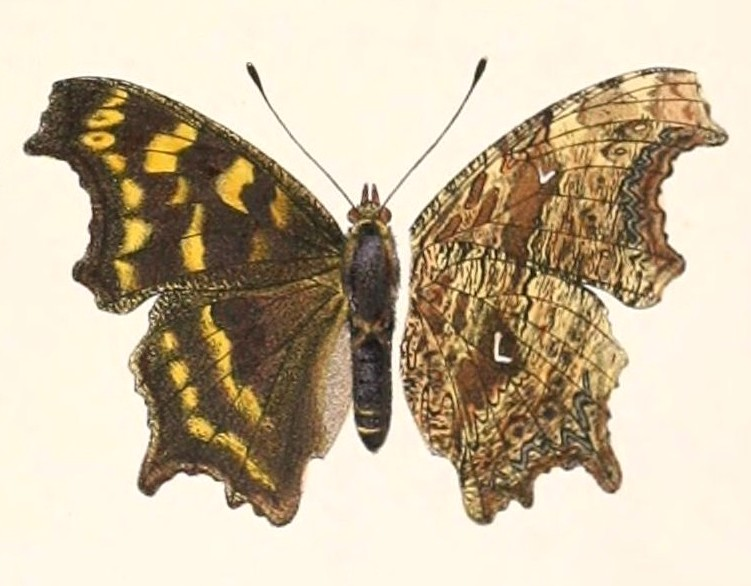
- Illustration accompanying description of synonym Grapta bocki

Scientific classification
- Domain: Eukaryota
- Kingdom: Animalia
- Phylum: Arthropoda
- Class: Insecta
- Order: Lepidoptera
- Family: Nymphalidae
- Genus: Polygonia
- Species: P. gigantea

Binomial name
- Polygonia gigantea (Leech, 1883)

Synonyms
- Grapta gigantea Leech, 1890; Nymphalis gigantea; Polygonia giganteum; Grapta erebina Oberthür, 1911; Grapta bocki Rothschild, 1894

= Polygonia gigantea =

Giant comma

Species of butterfly

Polygonia gigantea, the giant comma, is a butterfly of the family Nymphalidae. It is found in western and central China.

The wingspan is about 72 mm.
