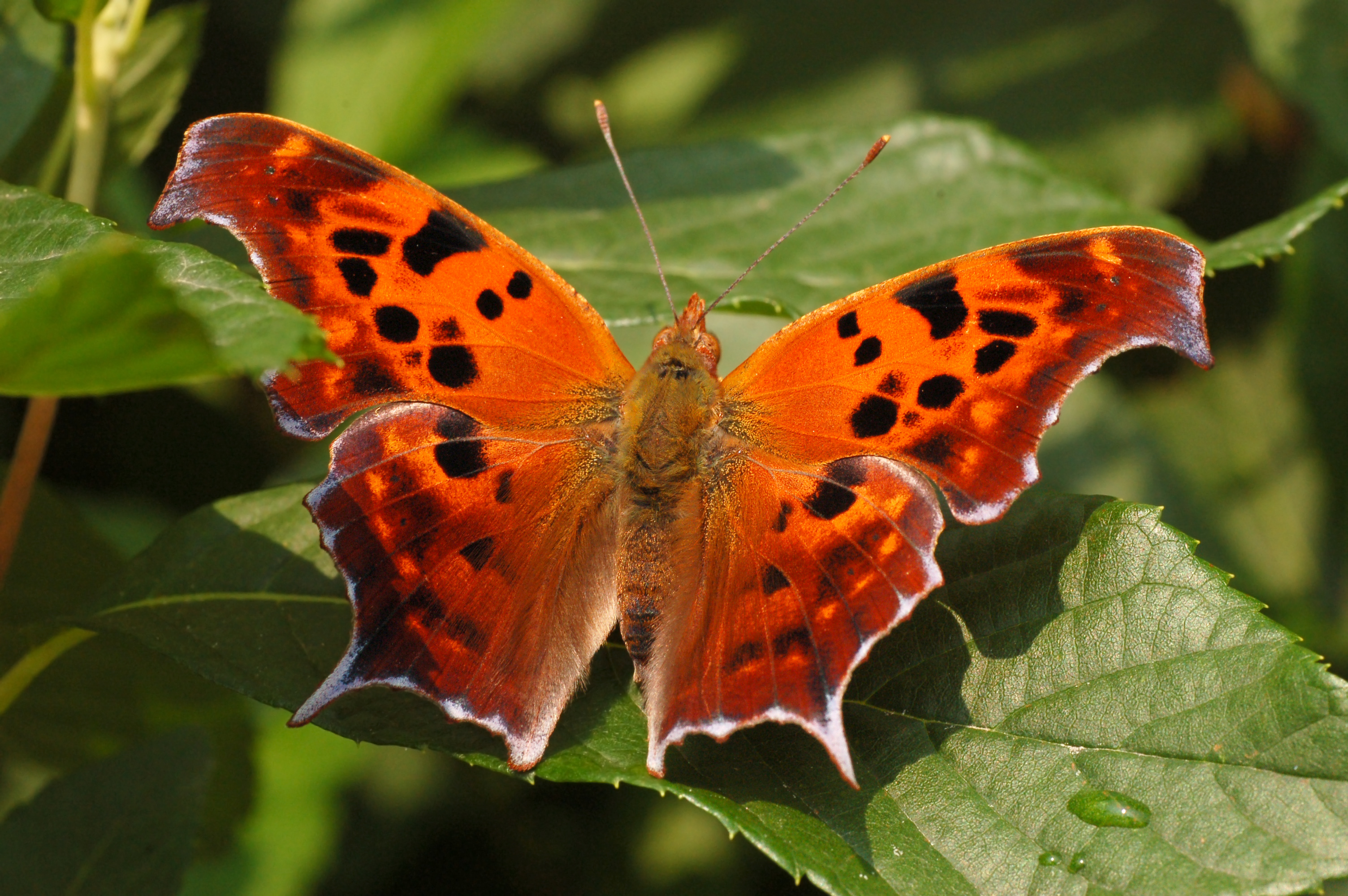
- Upperside
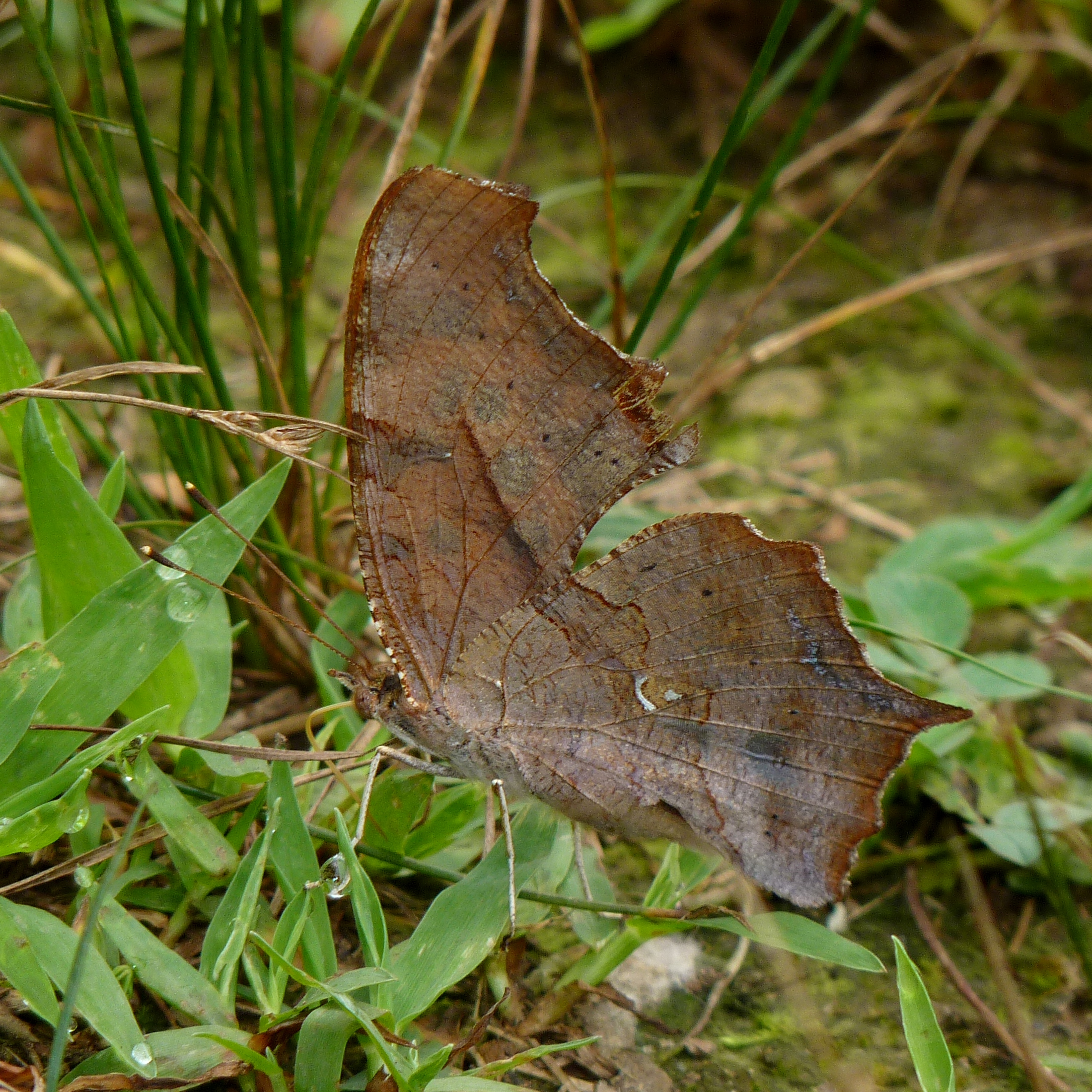
- Underside

Conservation status
- Least Concern (IUCN 3.1)

- Secure (NatureServe)

Scientific classification
- Kingdom: Animalia
- Phylum: Arthropoda
- Clade: Pancrustacea
- Class: Insecta
- Order: Lepidoptera
- Family: Nymphalidae
- Genus: Polygonia
- Species: P. interrogationis

Binomial name
- Polygonia interrogationis (Fabricius, 1798)

Synonyms
- Nymphalis interrogationis

= Polygonia interrogationis =

Question mark

Species of butterfly

Polygonia interrogationis, commonly called the question mark butterfly, is a North American nymphalid butterfly. It lives in wooded areas, city parks, generally in areas with a combination of trees and open space. The color and textured appearance of the underside of its wings combine to provide camouflage that resembles a dead leaf. The adult butterfly has a wingspan of 4.5–7.6 cm (1.8–3.0 in). Its flight period is from May to September. "The silver mark on the underside of the hindwing is broken into two parts, a curved line and a dot, creating a ?-shaped mark that gives the species its common name."

== Lifecycle ==
Like other species in the order of Lepidoptera, the question mark is a holometabolous insect that undergoes four life stages. These four life stages are embryo (egg), larva (in this case, caterpillar), pupa (chrysalis), and imago (or adult/butterfly).

=== Eggs ===
After the male has found the female perching on a tree or in the grass, courting ensues, after which the mating of the two occurs. Females lay eggs singly or stacked under leaves of plants that are usually not the hosts. The young hatchlings must then find their food source to survive.

=== Larvae ===
Larvae of the question mark butterfly, like all larvae, mature through a series of stages called instars. Near the end of each instar, the larva undergoes a process called apolysis, in which the cuticle, a tough outer layer made of a mixture of chitin and specialized proteins, is released from the softer part beneath, and that part begins to form a new cuticle beneath. At the end of each instar, the larva moults the old cuticle, and the new cuticle expands, before rapidly hardening and developing pigment. Development of butterfly wing patterns begins by the last larval instar.

=== Larvae host plants ===
Unlike some caterpillars, larvae of this butterfly feed on a variety of host plants. American elm (Ulmus americanus), red elm (Ulmus rubra), hackberry (Celtis), Japanese hop (Humulus japonicus), nettles (Urtica), and false nettle (Boehmeria cylindrica) are the main ones listed. They may also feed on clearweed (Pilea pumila).

=== Pupae ===
Once the larvae have undergone their last instar, the caterpillars pupate in a chrysalis. Unlike many moths, which build cocoons to pupate in, the majority of butterfly pupae are "naked", meaning without the protection of the earth or a cocoon to protect them. After it has reached the end of its last instar, it sheds its skin (molting or apolysis), becoming a soft fleshy pupae, wherein upon close observation many parts of the future butterfly can be seen prior to the new skin hardening. As it hardens, the pupa takes on colors of its surroundings, providing it with excellent camouflage. After many days to a couple of weeks the butterfly emerges, usually in the morning or afternoon hours.

=== Adults ===
As an adult butterfly, the question mark seeks out rotting fruit, tree sap, dung, or carrion as food sources. Only when these are unavailable do question marks visit flowers for nectar. This dietary adaptation is especially beneficial to the late spring / overwintering / early spring brood when nectar sources may be limited.

==== Recorded locations ====
This species has been found in southern Canada and all of the eastern United States except peninsular Florida, west to the eastern edge of the Rocky Mountains, south to southern Arizona and Mexico. It is known to be migratory.

==== Flight times ====
Generally speaking, the question mark flies and lays eggs in the spring until the end of May. The summer adults emerge and fly from May–September, laying eggs that develop into the winter form; these adults appear in late August and spend the winter in various shelters.

== Gallery ==
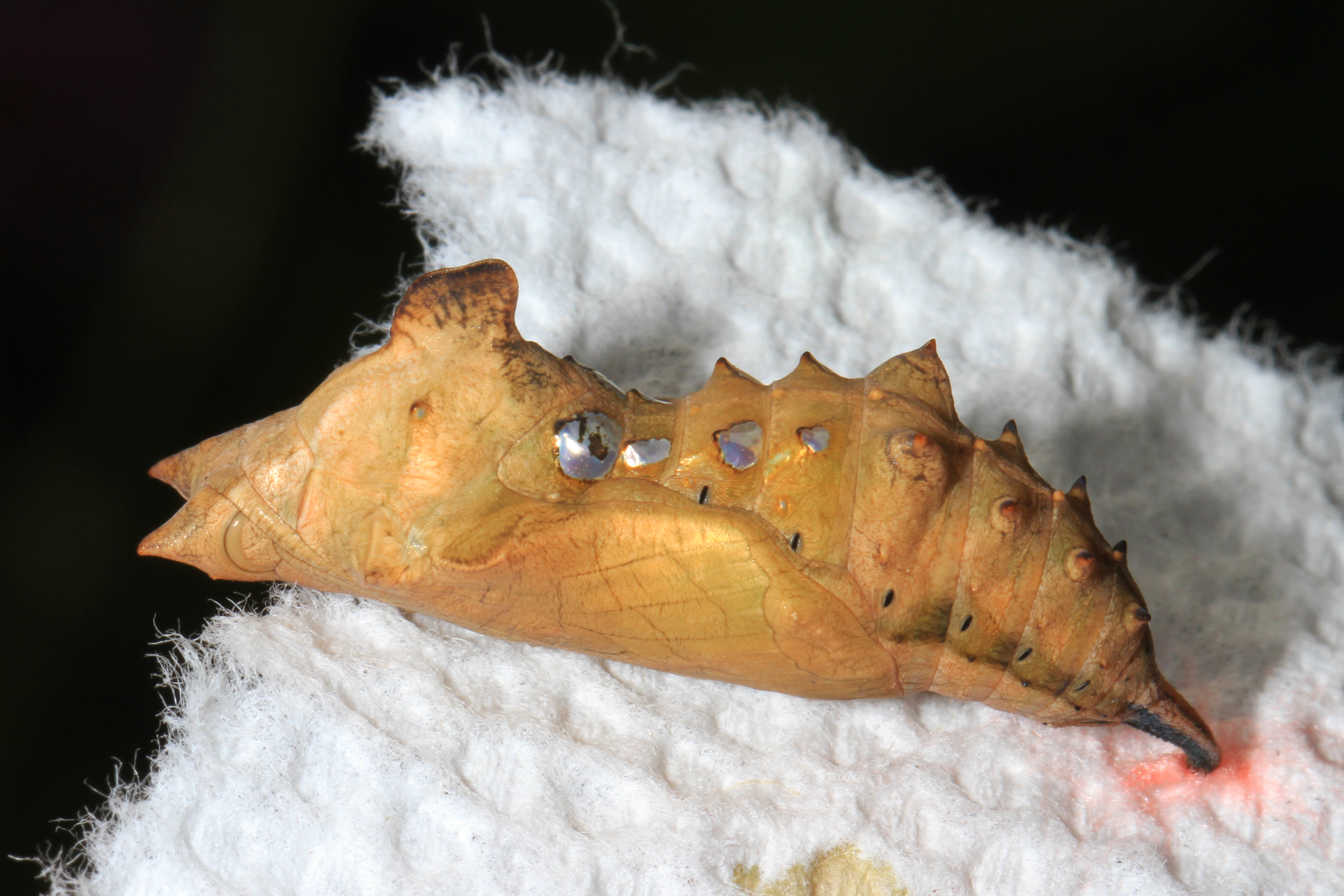
Chrysalis

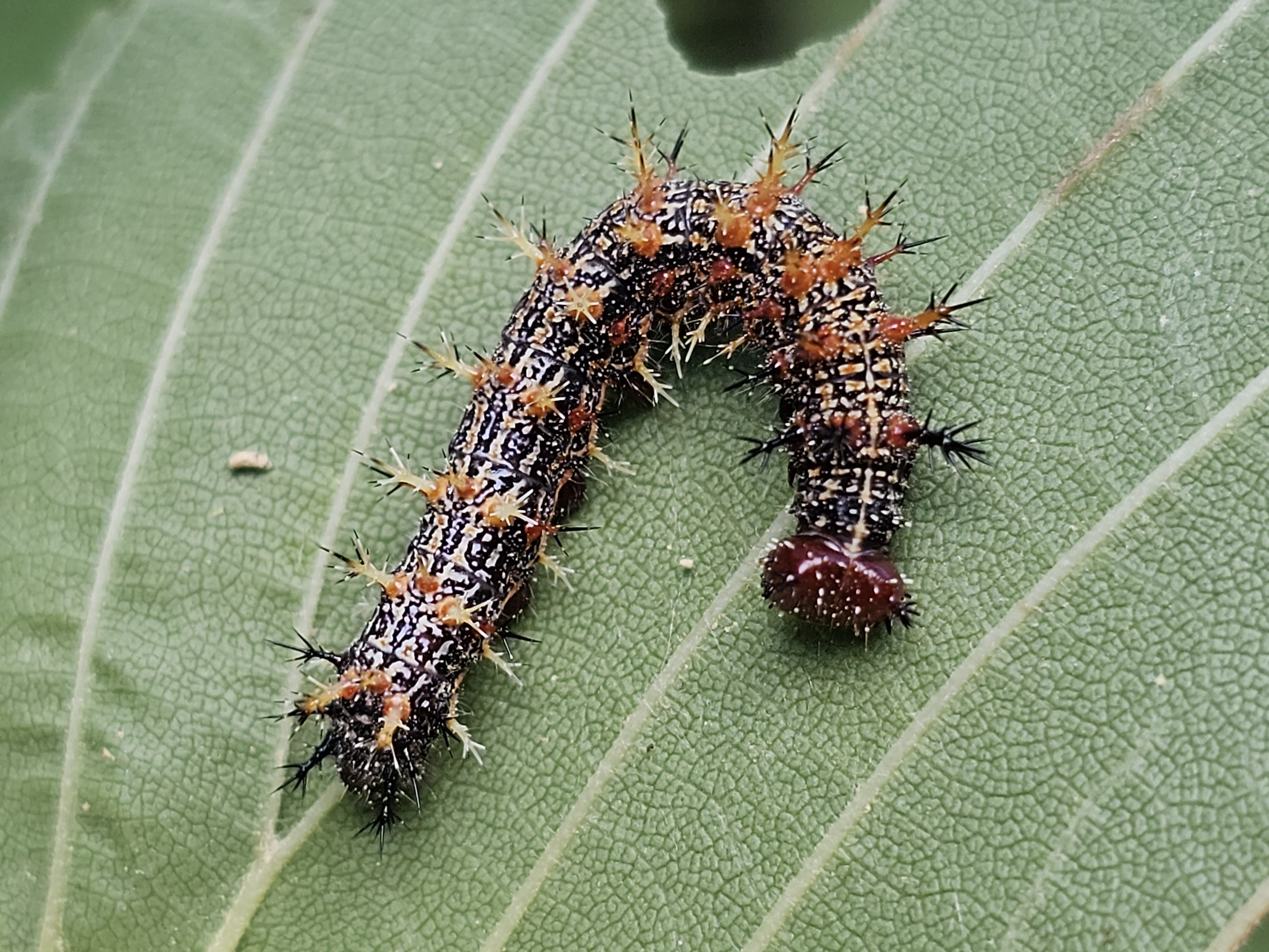
Larva

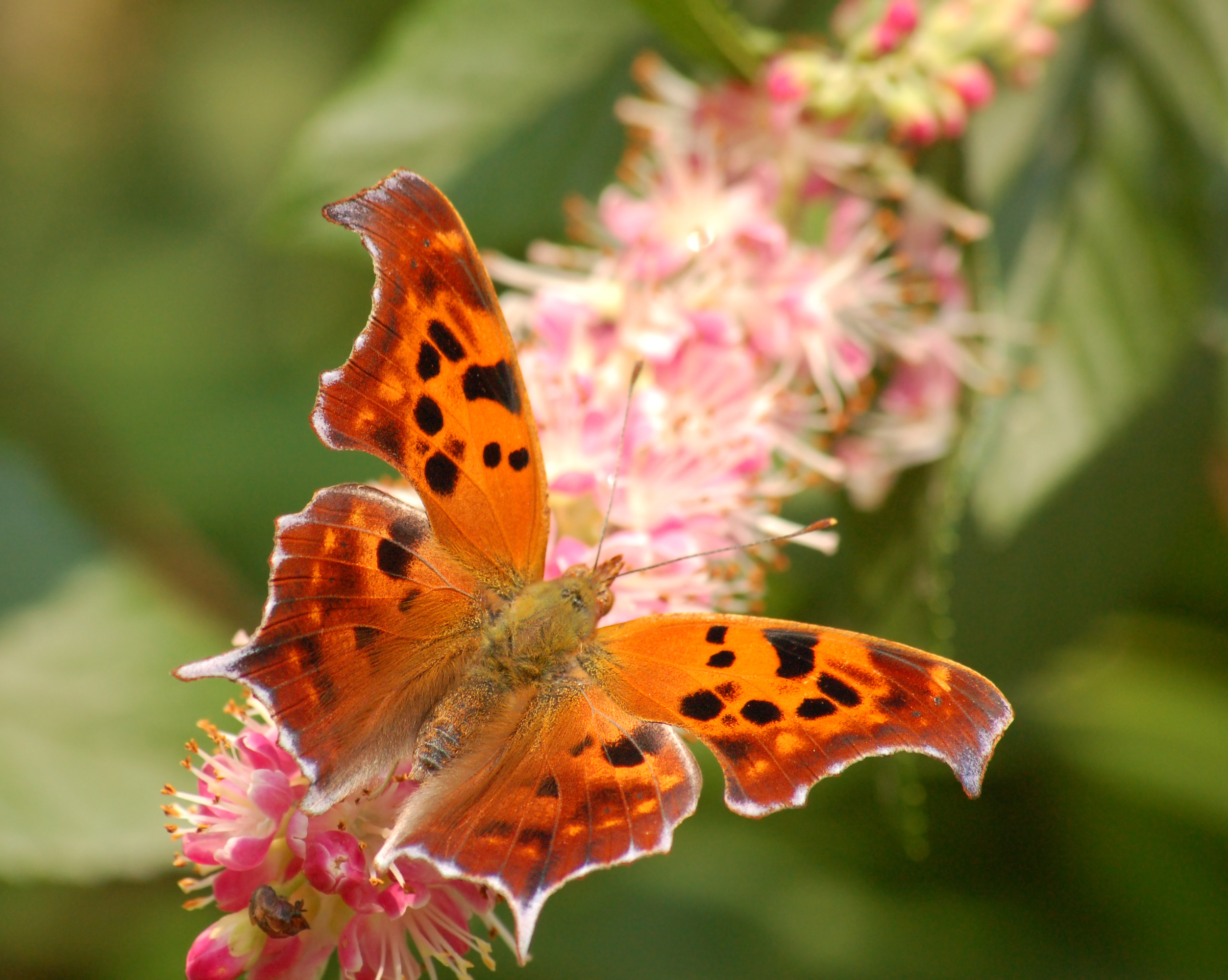
Dorsal

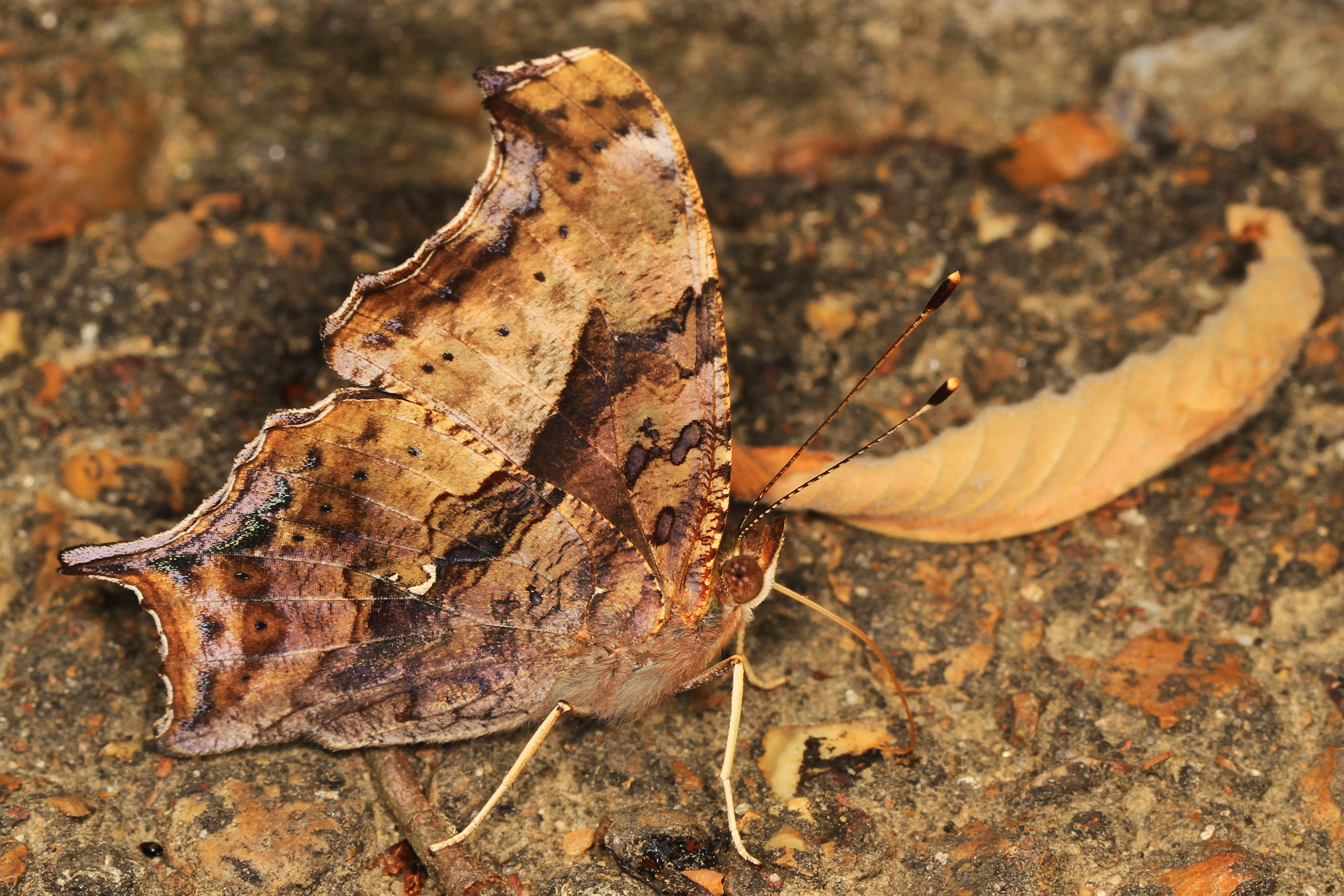
Ventral

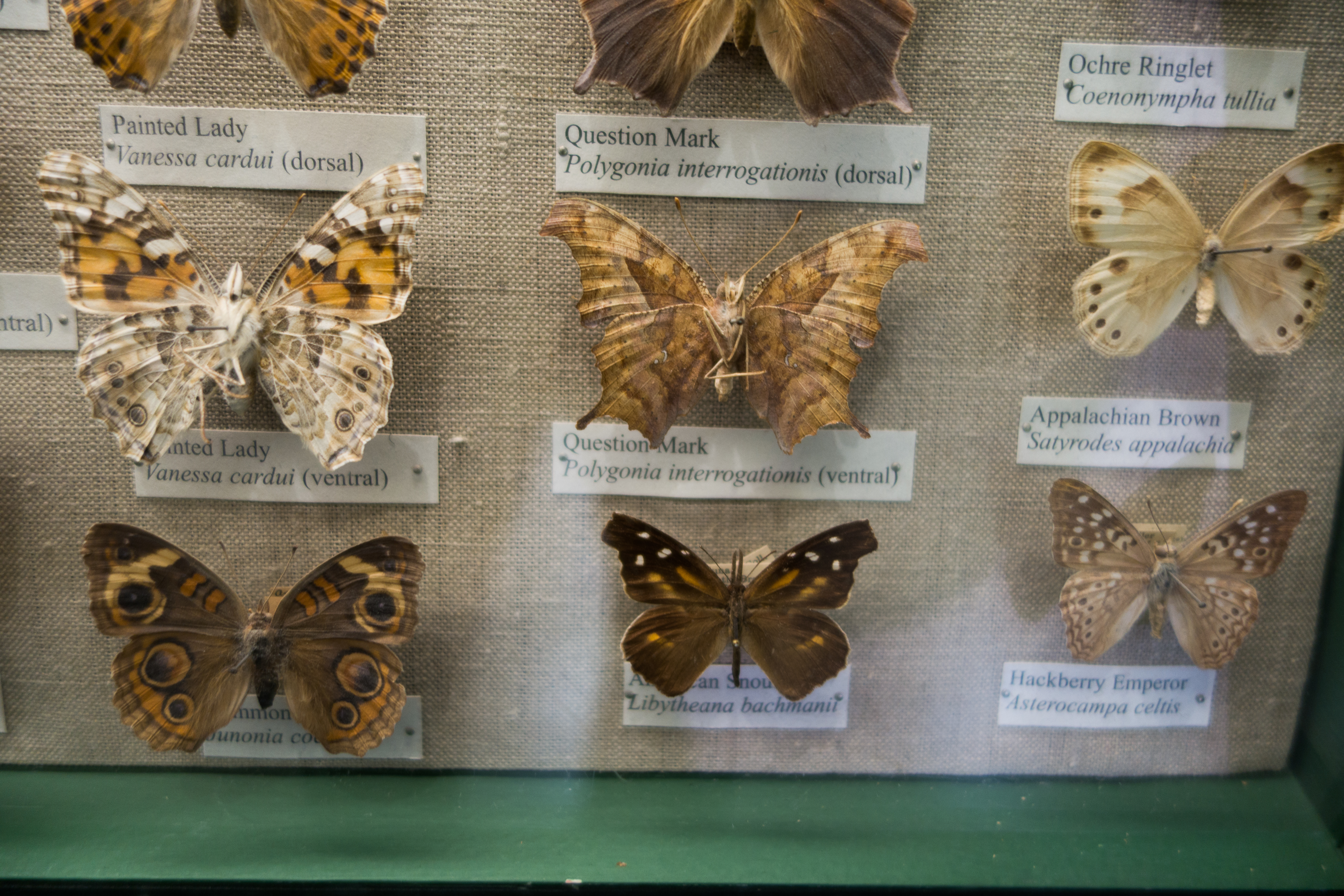
Mounted
