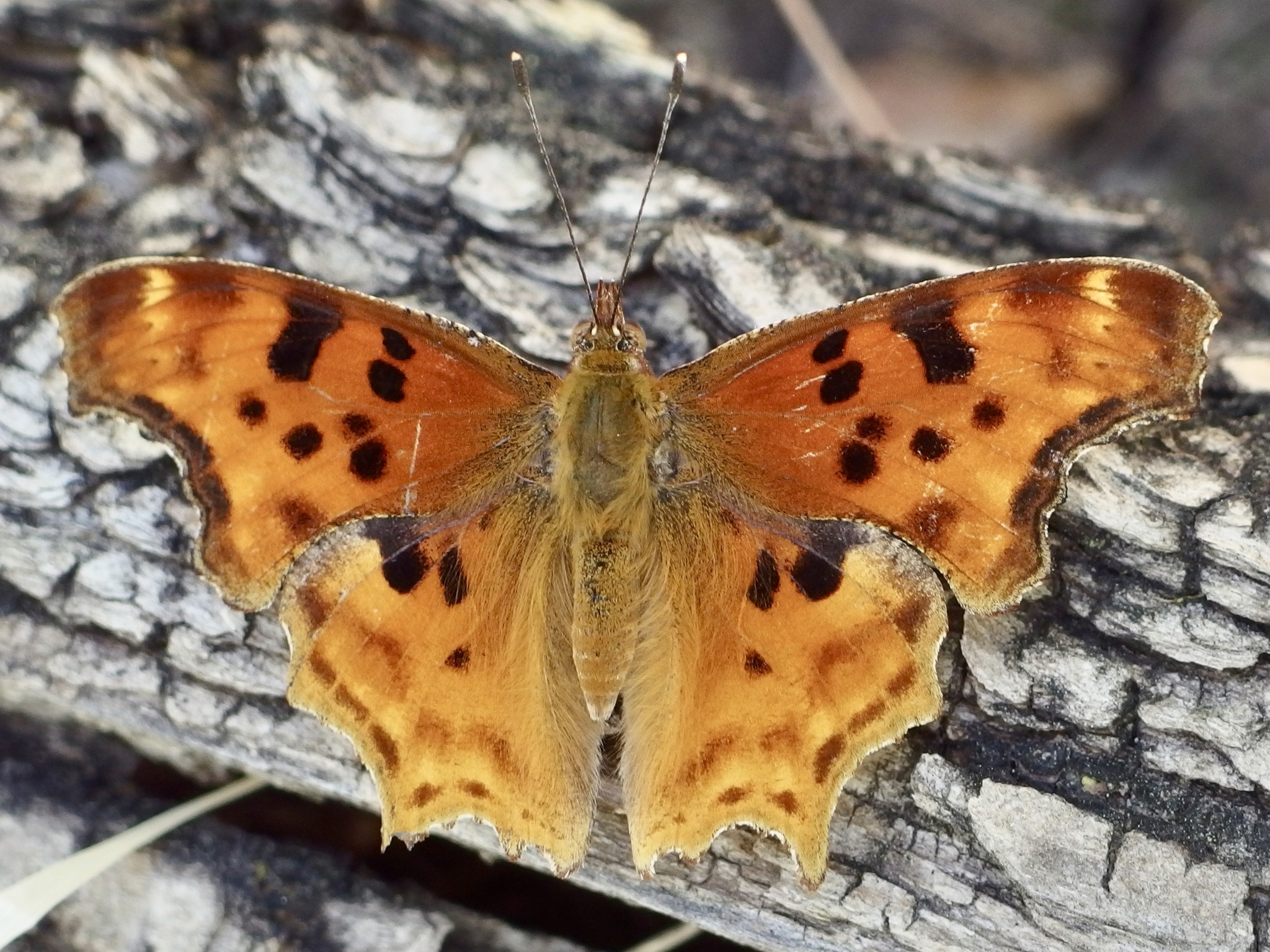
- Santa Cruz County, Arizona, United States
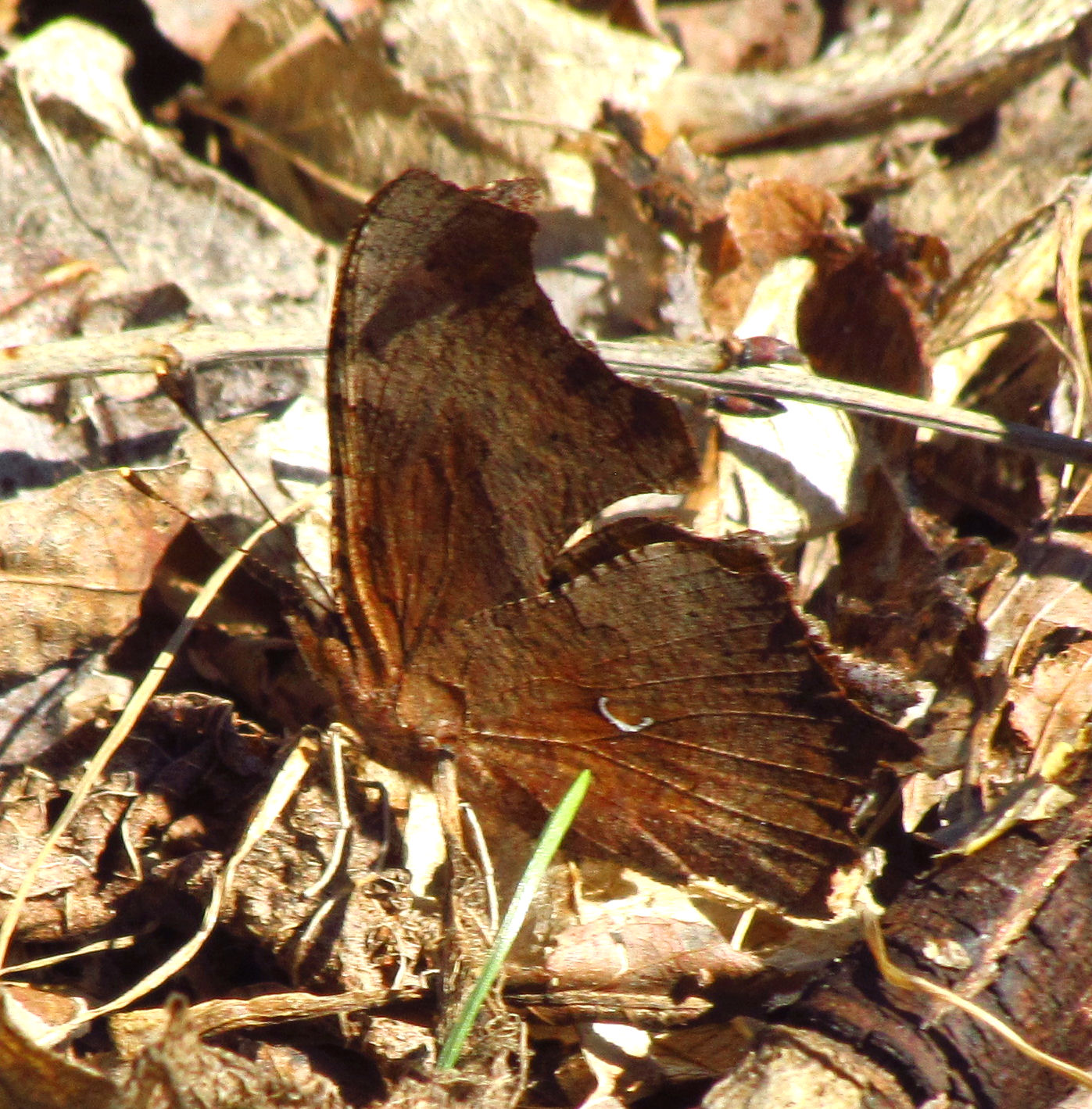
- Underside, Ottawa, Ontario

Scientific classification
- Kingdom: Animalia
- Phylum: Arthropoda
- Clade: Pancrustacea
- Class: Insecta
- Order: Lepidoptera
- Family: Nymphalidae
- Genus: Polygonia
- Species: P. satyrus

Binomial name
- Polygonia satyrus (W.H. Edwards, 1869)

Synonyms
- Nymphalis satyrus

= Polygonia satyrus =

Species of butterfly

Polygonia satyrus, the satyr comma, is a North American butterfly of the nymphalid family. It is primarily found in western Canada, where it is locally common. It bears a resemblance to Polygonia comma, the eastern comma, with which it is frequently confused.

== Taxonomy ==
Polygonia satyrus was first described by William Henry Edwards in 1869 from specimens collected in Colorado. Several names that were historically treated as distinct taxa, including P. marsyas, P. chrysoptera, and P. hollandi, have subsequently been regarded as synonyms of P. satyrus. Some authors previously considered marsyas to represent a distinct Pacific Northwestern subspecies, but breeding experiments and distributional evidence suggested that it represents a dark form of P. satyrus rather than a separate taxon.

Morphological studies have suggested a close relationship between P. satyrus and the eastern comma (Polygonia comma). Similarities in genital morphology, larval biology, host plant use, and wing pattern have led some authors to regard P. satyrus as a western subspecies of P. comma.

Polygonia satyrus belongs to the tribe Nymphalini within the family Nymphalidae. Phylogenetic studies place the species within the genus Polygonia and suggest that it diverged from the lineage leading to P. c-album and P. faunus approximately 5 million years ago. The species retains the ancestral association with nettle hosts (Urtica spp.), a characteristic shared with early members of the tribe.

== Distribution and habitat ==
The satyr comma can be commonly found throughout the Nearctic. Individuals have been seen distributed throughout portions of North America and are particularly associated with habitats containing suitable larval host plants. The species has been recorded to be from multiple different habitat types, including grassland and Great Plains ecosystems. Recent surveys in eastern New Mexico documented new locality records for the species in the Llano Estacado region, extending known records in the area.

== Life cycle ==
Polygonia satyrus undergoes complete metamorphosis just like the other members of the genus Polygonia. They develop through egg, larval, pupal, and adult stages. The larvae pass through five instars before they go through pupation. In Colorado, it has been reported that the species produces two generations per year at lower elevations and one generation per year at higher elevations. The larvae feed on the host plants stinging nettles and the common hop before they pupate and emerge as adults.

=== Egg ===
The eggs of Polygonia satyrus are green and have vertical and horizontal ribs. Before hatching, the eggs of the butterfly turn slightly black with a silvery, reflective, transparent shell as the larvae become more visible.

=== Larvae ===
In the first stage of larvae, the head is black without patterns or horns. The body is dark brown with long black setae, brown bump-like bases with pale cream-white bumps and few creamy sublateral dashes.

The second stage larvae develop 2 short spiny black horns. The body becomes reddish brown.

In the third stage, the black head develops a cream notch on top running forward to form an inverted V on its face with a cream band on its body.

The fourth larval instar resembles the mature larva but differs in having more orange-colored spines (scoli). Some abdominal spines are surrounded by dark brown rings near their bases, a feature that is absent in the final larval stage. As development progresses, the larva gradually acquires the coloration and patterning characteristic of mature larvae.

The final larval instar of Polygonia satyrus has a predominantly yellow to greenish-yellow body. The head is black with pale cream markings, including a distinctive inverted V-shaped marking on the front. Mature larvae retain the dorsal V-shaped pattern common to species in the genus Polygonia, although the upper lateral markings are reduced or absent. Pale yellow lateral bands and yellow spines contribute to the larva's overall light coloration.

The larvae display a unique behavior not seen among other Polygonia species in that they are the only ones known to construct protective nests by turning under the edge of a leaf and binding it into place with strands of silk.

=== Pupa ===
The pupa of Polygonia satyrus is usually a pale tan or straw-colored. Some individuals may turn out yellowish or even brown (rarely). It has metallic silver or gold markings and many raised cones and ridges inherited from its larval structures. Compared to other related Polygonia species, the pupa is distinguished by a prominent dorsal keel on the second thoracic segment and enlarged abdominal cones. The silk pad used to attach the pupa is usually yellowish white, and can occasionally come with a faint pink tint.

=== Adult ===
Adult Polygonia satyrus display many variations in their wing coloration and patterning. Individuals may occur in either a light or dark form, however there are also numerous intermediate forms of the coloration present. While both sexes share similar wing patterns, the females of this species are generally slightly larger than the males.

=== Reproduction ===
Females lay pale green eggs on the undersides of leaves of host plants. Eggs are often deposited in small chains of three to four. After hatching, larvae feed on host plant foliage and construct protective shelters by folding leaf edges and securing them with silk.

== Behavior ==
=== Predator avoidance ===
Polygonia satyrus exhibits many adaptations that may reduce predation. The larvae have branched spines (scoli), which are thought to deter predators and can cause slight irritation when touched. Older larvae may adopt a "corkscrew" posture by grasping a twig with their prolegs and raising the abdomen, causing them to resemble a dead leaf or twisted twig. Older larvae also construct shelters by folding and silk-binding nettle leaves around themselves. When disturbed, young larvae can drop from the host plant on a silk thread and later climb back to the plant. Pupae are constricted at the middle and have reflective silver markings, features that may help them resemble dead or shriveled leaves.

For adults, when are resting, the adults hold their wings closed in order to resemble dead leaves, and individuals have been observed feigning death when they are disturbed.

=== Oviposition ===
Female satyr commas display specialized host-searching behavior during oviposition. This means that they prefer to lay eggs on fresh, higher quality stinging nettles over poor quality nettles. This behavior may be associated with Polygonia satyrus's relatively specialized host range, as females show greater discrimination between host plant quality than other generalist butterfly species.

== Phenology ==
Polygonia satyrus exhibits polymorphism, occurring in both light and dark forms. Unlike some related species, the distinction between forms is not strongly associated with season, and intermediate forms are relatively common. Darker individuals are more frequently encountered in the Pacific Northwest, although the variation is considered part of the normal range of the species rather than evidence of distinct subspecies.

Although populations of Polygonia satyrus from California and Colorado were reported to be similar in appearance, populations from high elevations in southeastern Arizona have been described as distinctive. Individuals from these populations tend to be larger and differ slightly in wing shape, with broader forewings and more pronounced hindwing projections. Seasonal dimorphism has also been reported to be more consistent in Arizona populations, with spring individuals typically exhibiting darker coloration and summer individuals exhibiting lighter coloration.

Studies have suggested that Polygonia satyrus have been able to retain characteristics of ancestral seasonal polymorphism within its genus. Experimental studies have shown that when day length is increased during larval development, the adults may produce different coloration than in regular day length. This may suggest that photoperiodic responses have remained present in the species. The species exhibits less pronounced seasonal polymorphism than some other related comma butterflies, and variation in coloration has been suggested to be influenced by environmental conditions.

== Larval host plants ==
- Urtica dioica – common nettle
- Humulus Lupus – common hop
