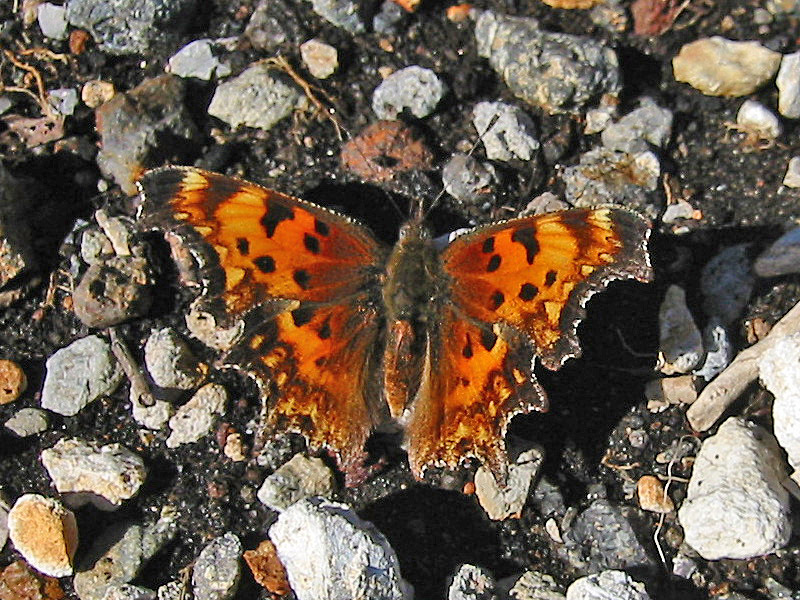

Scientific classification
- Kingdom: Animalia
- Phylum: Arthropoda
- Clade: Pancrustacea
- Class: Insecta
- Order: Lepidoptera
- Family: Nymphalidae
- Genus: Polygonia
- Species: P. gracilis

Binomial name
- Polygonia gracilis (Grote & Robinson, 1867)

Synonyms
- Nymphalis gracilis

= Hoary comma =

Species of butterfly

The hoary comma (Polygonia gracilis) is a species of butterfly, common in boreal North America from Alaska, across southern Canada to New England and the Maritime Provinces and south to New Mexico from the Rocky Mountains to the Pacific Ocean. The wings have a distinctive ragged edge.

Adult butterflies feed on tree sap and nectar from sweet everlasting (Gnaphalium) as well as other flowers. Caterpillars feed on shrub leaves including currant (Ribes), western azalea (Rhododendron occidentale) and mock azalea (Rhododendron menziesii).

The species survives the winter in the adult stage in diapause and mates and lay eggs in the spring. Butterflies emerge from their chrysalids in midsummer.

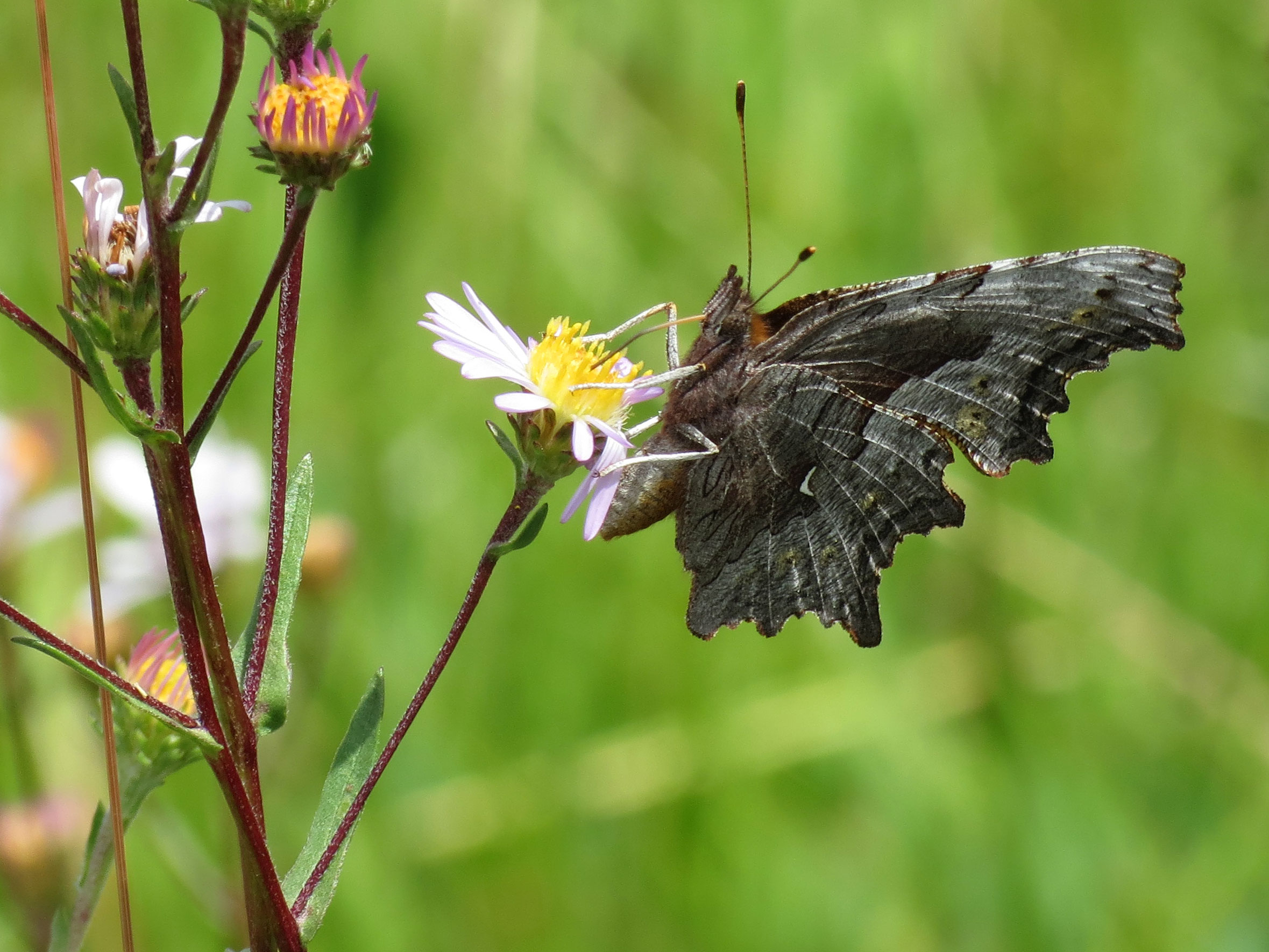
