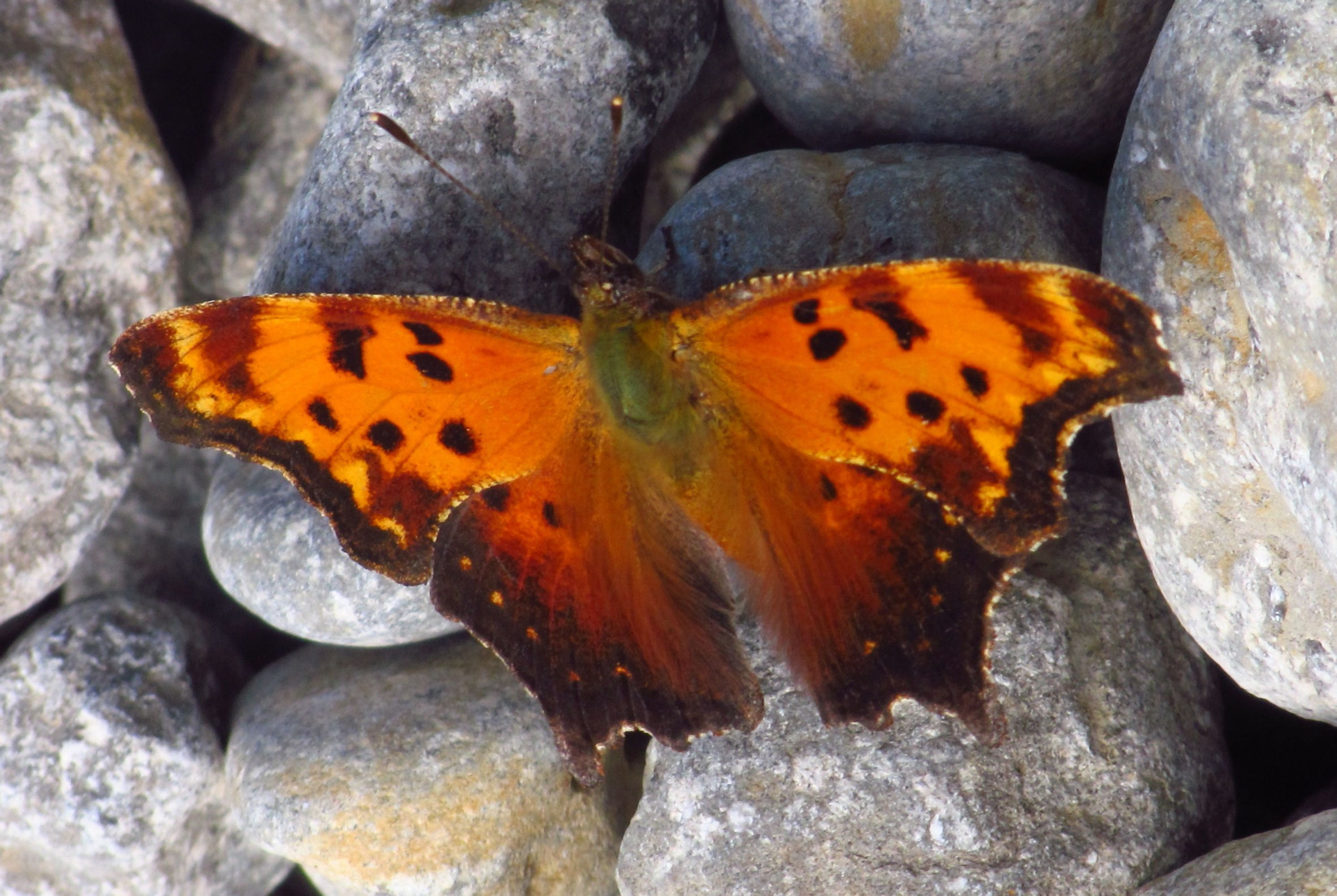

Conservation status
- Secure (NatureServe)

Scientific classification
- Kingdom: Animalia
- Phylum: Arthropoda
- Class: Insecta
- Order: Lepidoptera
- Family: Nymphalidae
- Genus: Polygonia
- Species: P. progne

Binomial name
- Polygonia progne (Cramer, 1775)

Subspecies
- P. p. progne (Scott, 1988); P. p. nigrozephyrus (Scott, 1984)

Synonyms
- Nymphalis progne; Papilio progne (Cramer, 1775); Polygonia l-argenteum (Scudder, 1875)

= Polygonia progne =

Species of butterfly

Polygonia progne, the gray comma or grey comma, is a species of Polygonia that occurs in North America.

== Description ==
Its wingspan is between 4.4 and 6.3 cm. The top of the wings is bright orange brown while the summer forms often have a dark border on the hindwing. Both winter and summer forms have few yellow spots on their wing borders. The underside of the wings have L-shaped silver markings and are charcoal gray.

== Habitat ==
They can often be found around dirt roads and stream beds. Most often they are found in hilly terrain or canyon lands.

== Life cycle ==
The adults are on wing two times a year, once in April and May and another in June and August. During the first flight the adults mate and lay eggs. These eggs will hatch and become the summer generation. The summer generation's eggs will hatch in October and hibernate.

=== Larval foods ===
- Gooseberry
- Azalea

=== Adult foods ===
- Plant sap
- Rarely flower nectar
