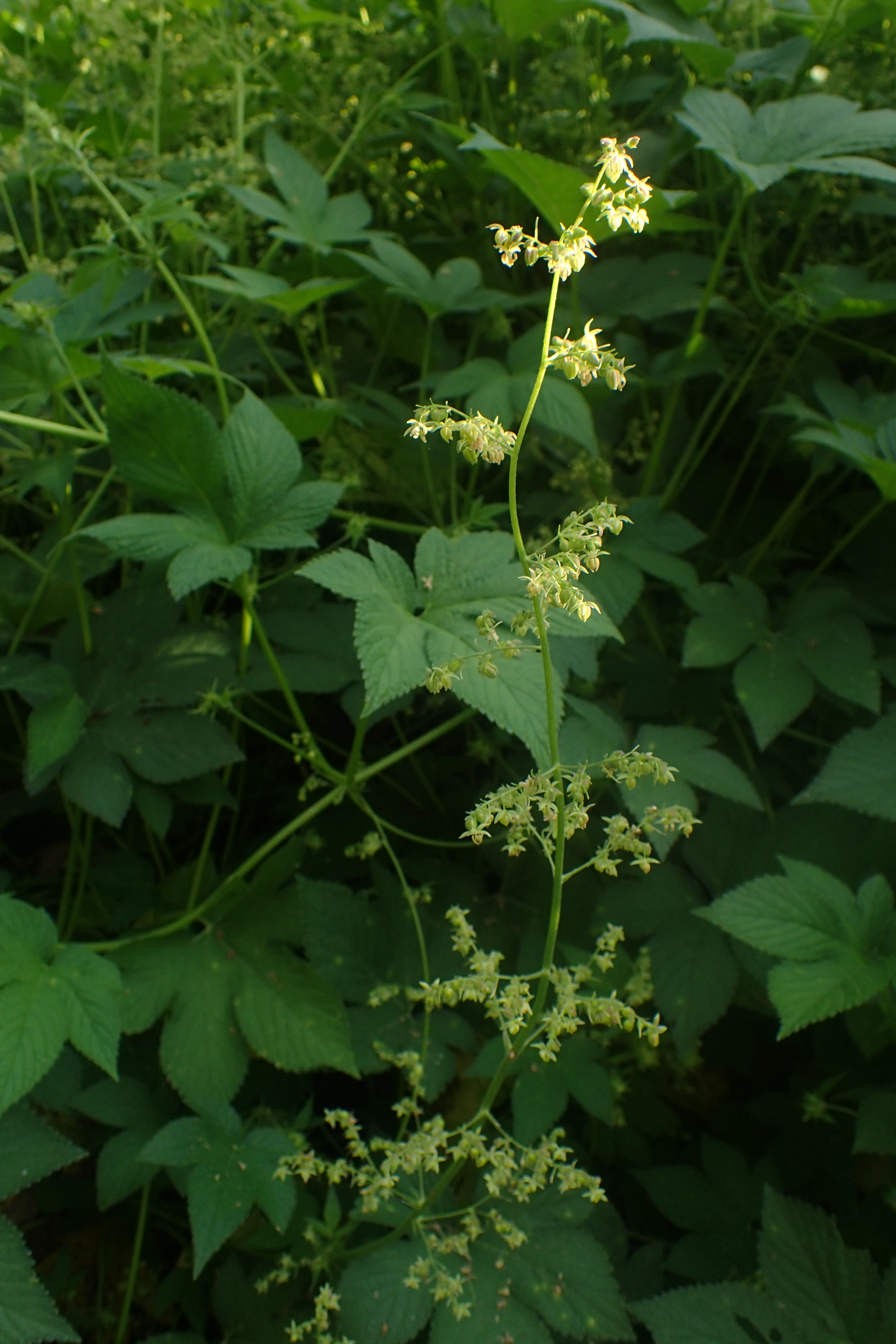

Scientific classification
- Kingdom: Plantae
- Clade: Embryophytes
- Clade: Tracheophytes
- Clade: Spermatophytes
- Clade: Angiosperms
- Clade: Eudicots
- Clade: Rosids
- Order: Rosales
- Family: Cannabaceae
- Genus: Humulus
- Species: H. japonicus

Binomial name
- Humulus japonicus (Lour.) Merr.

Synonyms
- Humulopsis scandens (Lour.) Grudz.; Antidesma scandens Lour.; Humulus aculeatus Nutt.; Humulus japonicus Siebold & Zucc.; Humulus japonicus var. minor Nakai; Humulus japonicus var. variegatus F.Roem.; Humulus scandens var. variegatus (F.Roem.) Moldenke

= Humulus japonicus =

Species of flowering plant

Humulus japonicus is a species of flowering plant in family Cannabaceae. This ornamental plant is sometimes referred to by the common name Japanese hops. Originally native to East Asian countries such as China, Japan, Korea, and extending its habitat to Vietnam, it was imported to North America in the late 19th century as an ornamental.

Since its arrival in North America, it has spread widely. It can be found throughout the Northeastern U.S. and eastern Canada, and considered an invasive species in North America. It also features on the list of invasive alien species of Union concern since 2019. This means it can no longer be imported in the European Union. Additionally, it has become illegal to plant it, breed it, transport it, or bring it into the wild in all Member States.

== Nomenclature ==
Humulus japonicus (syn. H. scandens, Antidesma scandens) is known by the common name of "Asian hop","Japanese hop", or "wild hop".

The plant is called lü cao (葎草) in Mandarin Chinese, and kanamugura (カナムグラ) in Japanese.

== Description ==
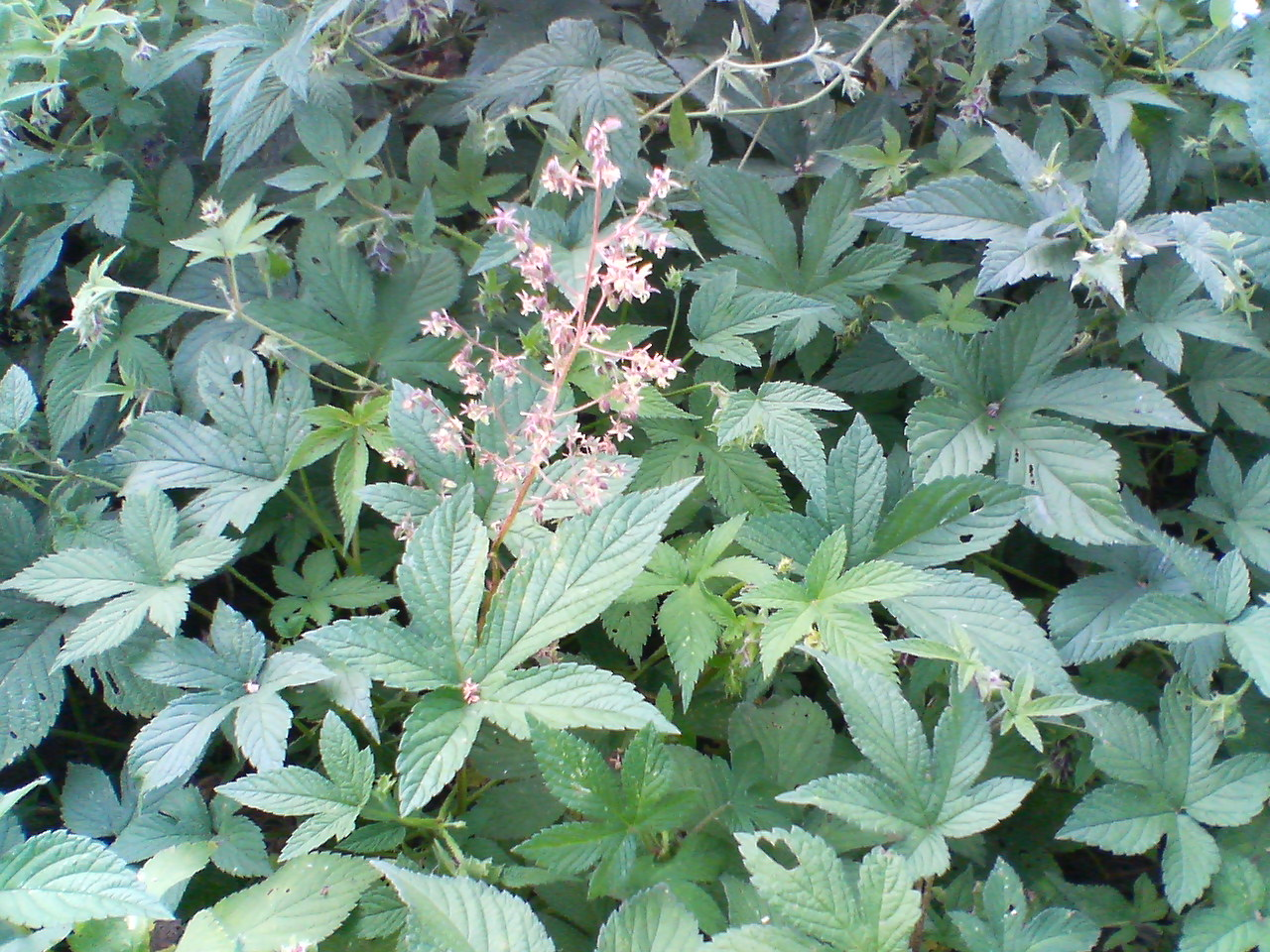

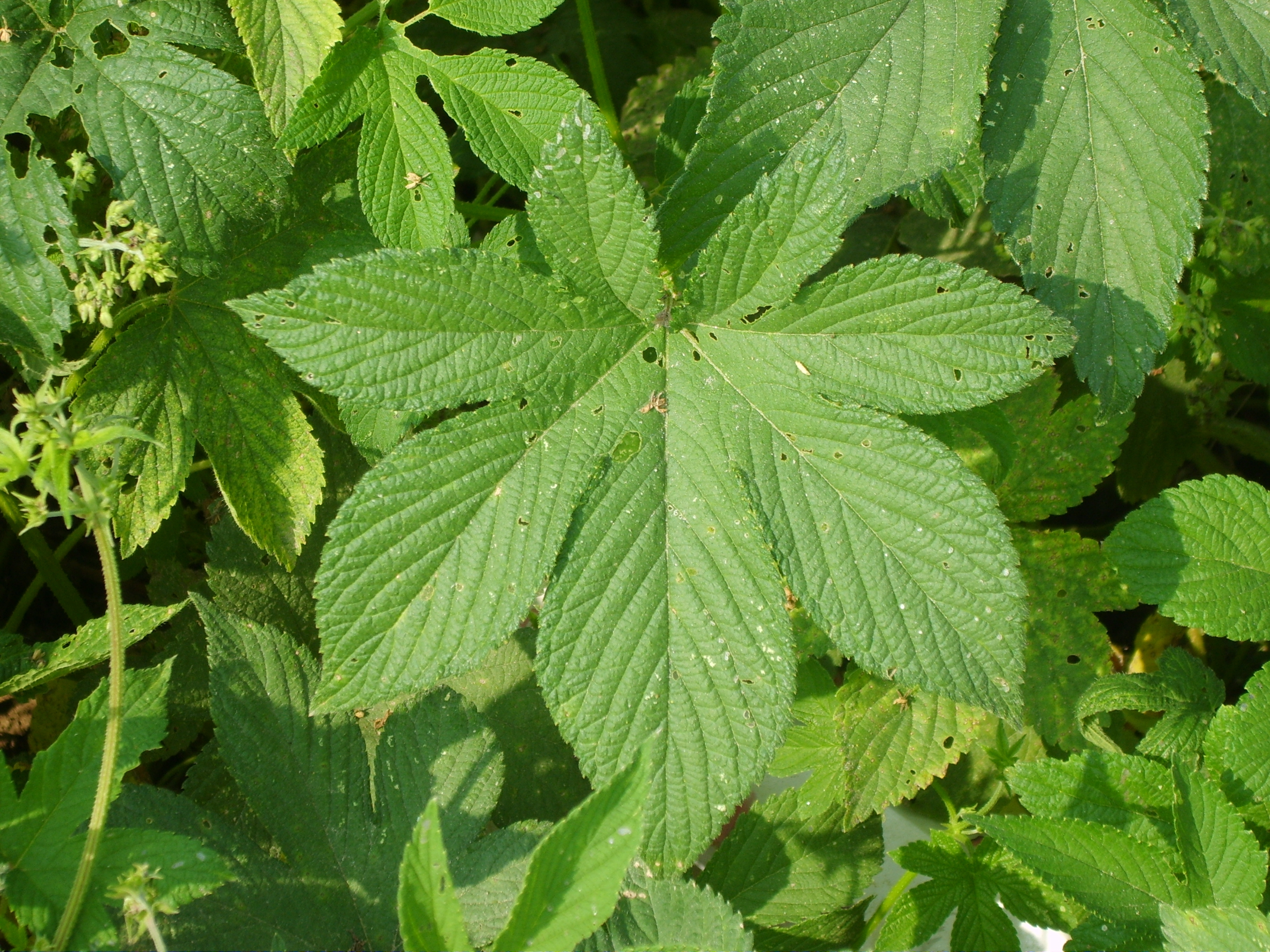
Leaves

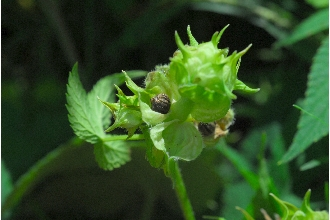
Flower

Well-developed leaves with 5-9 lobes; abaxial surfaces of leaves pubescent, but not densely so; infructescence rarely longer than 2 cm, with bracts and bracteoles less than 1 cm long, and notable spinulose-ciliate Inflorescences: staminate inflorescences erect, 15–25 cm, flower anthers without glands such as; pistillate inflorescences spikes, conelike, ovoid; bracteole ovate-orbiculate, 7–10 mm, pilose, margins densely ciliate-hairy. Infructescences pendulous, green, conelike, ovoid to oblong, (1–)1.5–3(–4) cm; bracteoles without yellow glands.

== Dispersal ==
Seeds germinate in early spring, but plants may continue to emerge if conditions are favorable. Seeds can be dispersed by number of agents including humans, animals, machines, and flood waters.

== Distribution and habitat ==
Humulus japonicus is native to temperate parts of Asia (China, Japan, Korea, Taiwan and the Russian Far East) and the tropical environment of Vietnam and Laos, but has become an invasive species in North America since it was imported in the late 19th century.

The plant has been immensely successful in North America, and is found throughout eastern Canada and the eastern half of the United States, and considered an invasive species. In the United States Humulus japonicus has a lateral range from Nebraska/North Dakota to Maine and a vertical range from Minnesota to Georgia.

Japanese hops grow well given plentiful sunlight, moisture, and nutrient rich soil, and are most commonly found along stream banks and floodplains. Japanese hops do not grow as well in shaded areas and drier soils. In milder climates, it can survive the winter.

== Economic uses ==
The plant was introduced into America in the 19th century both as an ornamental and raw ingredient for the Asian tonic. In traditional Chinese medicine this herb known as lü cao is used rather uncommonly, with supposed diuretic and heat-cooling effects.

Although related to the common hop Humulus lupulus, whose cultivars are the brewer's hop used in beer production, the Japanese hop is found to be deficient in the bitter acids and essential oils used for flavoring beer, being devoid of lupulin glands (or producing very few resin glands); hence the Japanese hop is not considered viable for use in brewing.

== Natural enemies ==
This species is a host plant for the butterfly Polygonia c-aureum, the Asian comma, hence in China the butterfly is considered a major pest affecting the cash crop used in medicine.

== Ecological threat ==
The Japanese hop can adapt well to new environments. Its range and distribution in North America prove that it can thrive in a wide range of environments, from the southern regions of the U.S. to the far reaches of Northern Canada. It can grow and cover any area quickly. Thousands of hop plants can grow in one acre, and they can blanket a majority of the local vegetation. The bines grow rapidly during the summer, climbing up and over everything in their path, and can form dense mats several feet deep, blocking light to whatever plants are underneath.
