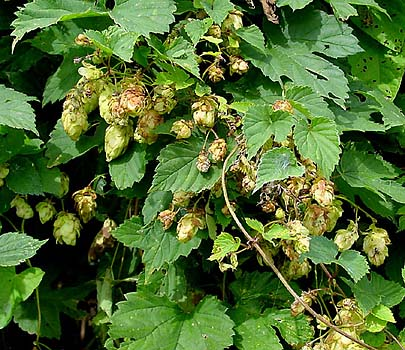
- Common hop plant (Humulus lupulus)

Scientific classification
- Kingdom: Plantae
- Clade: Tracheophytes
- Clade: Angiosperms
- Clade: Eudicots
- Clade: Rosids
- Order: Rosales
- Family: Cannabaceae
- Genus: Humulus; L.

Species
- See text.

Synonyms
- Lupulus Mill.; Waldensia Lavy

= Humulus =

Genus of flowering plants

Humulus, or hop, is a small genus of flowering plants in the hemp family, Cannabaceae. Its members are native to temperate regions of the Northern Hemisphere. Hops are the female flowers (seed cones, strobiles) of the hop species H. lupulus; as a main flavor and aroma ingredient in many beer styles, H. lupulus is widely cultivated for use by the brewing industry.

== Description ==
Although frequently referred to in American literature as the hops "vine", it is technically a bine; unlike vines, which use tendrils, suckers, and other appendages for attaching themselves, bines have stout stems with stiff hairs to aid in climbing. In British literature the term "vine" is generally reserved for the grape genus Vitis. Humulus is described as a twining perennial herbaceous plant which sends up new shoots in early spring and dies back to the cold-hardy rhizome in autumn. Hop shoots grow very rapidly, and at the peak of growth can grow 20 to 50 centimetres (8 to 20 inches) per week. Hop bines climb by wrapping clockwise (except for Humulus japonicus) around anything within reach, and individual bines typically grow between 2 and 15 metres (7 and 50 feet) depending on what is available to grow on. The leaves are opposite, with a 7 to 12 cm (2 3/4 to 4 3/4 in) leafstalk and a heart-shaped, fan-lobed blade 12 to 25 cm (4 3/4 to 9 3/4 in) long and broad; the edges are coarsely toothed. When the hop bines run out of material to climb, horizontal shoots sprout between the leaves of the main stem to form a network of stems wound round each other.

Male and female flowers of the hop plant are dioecious, developing on separate plants. Female plants, which produce the hop flowers used in brewing beer, are often propagated vegetatively and grown in the absence of male plants. This prevents pollination and the development of viable seeds, which are sometimes considered undesirable for brewing beer owing to the potential for off-flavors arising from the introduction of fatty acids from the seeds.

The characteristic bitterness imparted by the addition of hops to the brewing process is mainly due to the presence of bitter acids, which are prenylated acylphloroglucinol derivatives. Bitter acids are divided into the alpha-acids, with humulone the major compound, and the beta-acids, with lupulone the major compound; the alpha-acids isomerize during the brewing process to form iso-alpha acids, which themselves have a bitter taste. These hop acids are vinylogous acids, with acidic ring enols in conjugation with ring and substituent carbonyl groups. Plants in the genus Humulus produce terpenophenolic metabolites. Hops also contain xanthohumol, a prenylated chalcone, and other compounds.

== Taxonomy ==
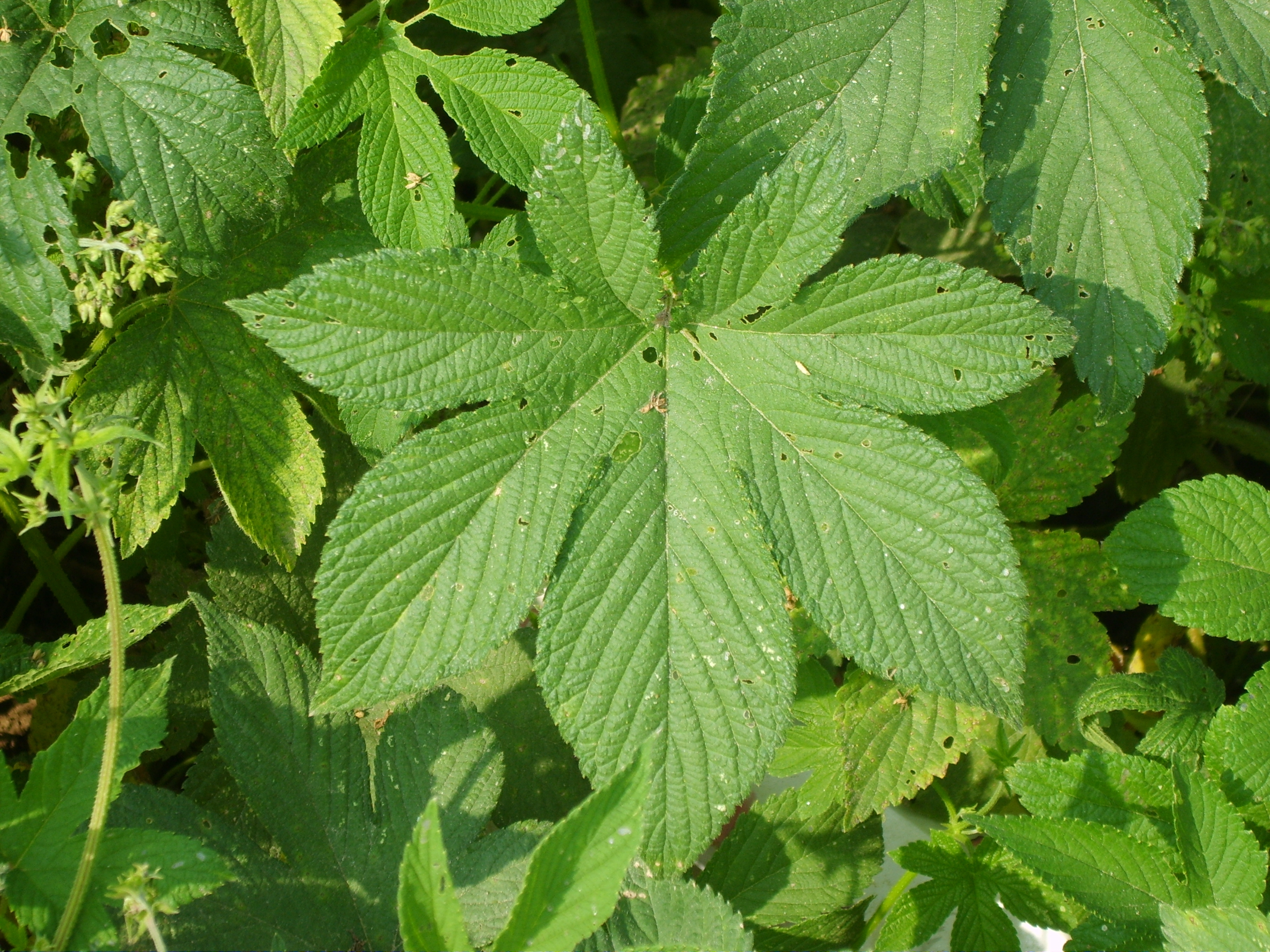
Humulus japonicus leaves

As of October 2020, the following species were accepted:

- Humulus americanus Nutt.
- Humulus cordifolius Miq.
- Humulus lupulus L.
- Humulus neomexicanus (A.Nelson & Cockerell) Rydb.
- Humulus pubescens (E.Small) Tembrock
- Humulus scandens (Lour.) Merr. (syn. Humulus japonicus Siebold & Zucc.)
- Humulus yunnanensis Hu

For brewers' hops, which are specific cultivars, and propagated by asexual reproduction, see the article, "List of hop varieties".

== Uses ==
Hops are boiled with the wort in brewing beer and sometimes added post-ferment; they impart bitterness, flavor, as well as aroma to the finished product.

In pharmacy lupulus is the designation of hop. The dried catkins, commonly referred to as hop cones, of the female plant of H. lupulus are used to prepare infusion of hop, tincture of hop, and extract of hop.

Some of the compounds hops contain are under preliminary research for their potential health properties.
