= List of butterflies of Nebraska =

This is a list of butterflies that can be found in Nebraska. This list is in alphabetical order.

- Achalarus lyciades
- Agraulis vanillae
- Amblyscirtes nysa
- Amblyscirtes oslari
- Amblyscirtes simius
- Amblyscirtes vialis
- Anaea andria
- Anaea troglodyta
- Anartia jatrophae
- Anatrytone logan
- Ancyloxypha numitor
- Anteos maerula
- Anthocharis midea
- Appias drusilla
- Asterocampa celtis
- Asterocampa clyton
- Atalopedes campestris
- Atrytone arogos
- Atrytonopsis hianna
- Battus philenor
- Boloria bellona
- Boloria chariclea
- Boloria selene
- Brephidium exile
- Callophrys affinis
- Callophrys eryphon
- Callophrys gryneus
- Callophrys henrici
- Callophrys niphon
- Calpodes ethlius
- Calycopis cecrops
- Celastrina ladon
- Celastrina neglecta
- Cercyonis meadii
- Cercyonis oetus
- Cercyonis pegala
- Chlosyne acastus
- Chlosyne gorgone
- Chlosyne lacinia
- Chlosyne nycteis
- Coenonympha tullia
- Colias alexandra
- Colias christina
- Colias eurytheme
- Colias philodice
- Danaus gilippus
- Danaus plexippus
- Dryas julia
- Echinargus isola
- Enodia anthedon
- Epargyreus clarus
- Erynnis afranius
- Erynnis baptisiae
- Erynnis brizo
- Erynnis funeralis
- Erynnis horatius
- Erynnis martialis
- Erynnis juvenalis
- Erynnis persius
- Euchloe ausonides
- Euchloe olympia
- Euphilotes ancilla
- Euphilotes rita
- Euphydryas chalcedona
- Euphydryas phaeton
- Euphyes bimacula
- Euphyes conspicua
- Euphyes dion
- Euphyes vestris
- Euptoieta claudia
- Eurema daira
- Eurema lisa
- Eurema mexicana
- Eurema nicippe
- Eurema nise
- Eurema proterpia
- Eurytides marcellus
- Everes amyntula
- Everes comyntas
- Feniseca tarquinius
- Glaucopsyche lygdamus
- Glaucopsyche piasus
- Heliconius charithonius
- Junonia coenia
- Hesperia attalus
- Hesperia colorado
- Hesperia juba
- Hesperia leonardus
- Hesperia metea
- Hesperia ottoe
- Hesperia pahaska
- Hesperia uncas
- Hesperia viridis
- Hylephila phyleus
- Icaricia icarioides
- Icaricia lupini
- Icaricia saepiolus
- Icaricia shasta
- Kricogonia lyside
- Leptotes marina
- Lerodea eufala
- Libytheana carinenta
- Limenitis archippus
- Limenitis arthemis
- Limenitis arthemis astyanax
- Limenitis weidemeyerii
- Lycaena dione
- Lycaena helloides
- Lycaena hyllus
- Lycaena phlaeas
- Lycaena rubidus
- Marpesia petreus
- Megathymus strecker
- Megathymus yuccae
- Megisto cymela
- Mestra amymone
- Ministrymon leda
- Nathalis iole
- Neominois ridingsii
- Neophasia menapia
- Nymphalis antiopa
- Nymphalis californica
- Nymphalis milberti
- Nymphalis vaualbum
- Oarisma garita
- Oeneis uhleri
- Papilio canadensis
- Papilio cresphontes
- Papilio eurymedon
- Papilio glaucus
- Papilio indra
- Papilio machaon
- Papilio multicaudata
- Papilio palamedes
- Papilio polyxenes
- Papilio rutulus
- Papilio troilus
- Parnassius smintheus
- Phoebis agarithe
- Phoebis philea
- Phoebis sennae
- Pholisora catullus
- Phyciodes batesii
- Phyciodes cocyta
- Phyciodes mylitta
- Phyciodes pallida
- Phyciodes phaon
- Phyciodes picta
- Phyciodes pratensis
- Phyciodes texana
- Phyciodes tharos
- Phyciodes vesta
- Pieris marginalis
- Pieris rapae
- Plebejus melissa
- Poanes hobomok
- Poanes taxiles
- Poanes viator
- Poanes zabulon
- Poladryas minuta
- Polites mystic
- Polites origenes
- Polites peckius
- Polites rhesus
- Polites sabuleti
- Polites themistocles
- Polygonia comma
- Polygonia gracilis
- Polygonia interrogationis
- Polygonia progne
- Polygonia satyrus
- Pompeius verna
- Pontia occidentalis
- Pontia protodice
- Pontia sisymbrii
- Pyrgus communis
- Pyrgus scriptura
- Satyrium acadica
- Satyrium calanus
- Satyrium caryaevorum
- Satyrium edwardsii
- Satyrium liparops
- Satyrium titus
- Satyrodes eurydice
- Speyeria aphrodite
- Speyeria callippe
- Speyeria coronis
- Speyeria cybele
- Speyeria edwardsii
- Speyeria hesperis
- Speyeria idalia
- Speyeria mormonia
- Speyeria zerene
- Staphylus hayhurstii
- Strymon melinus
- Thessalia fulvia
- Thorybes bathyllus
- Thorybes pylades
- Thymelicus lineola
- Vanessa annabella
- Vanessa atalanta
- Vanessa cardui
- Vanessa virginiensis
- Wallengrenia egeremet
- Zerene cesonia
