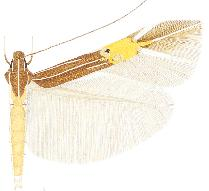

Scientific classification
- Kingdom: Animalia
- Phylum: Arthropoda
- Class: Insecta
- Order: Lepidoptera
- Family: Cosmopterigidae
- Genus: Cosmopterix
- Species: C. callichalca

Binomial name
- Cosmopterix callichalca Meyrick, 1922

Synonyms
- Cosmopterix dicacula Hodges, 1962

= Cosmopterix callichalca =

Species of moth

Cosmopterix callichalca is a moth of the family Cosmopterigidae. It is known from Argentina (Salta), Brazil (Amazonas, Distrito Federal, Goias, Minas Gerais) and the United States (Alabama, Florida, Louisiana, Michigan, Mississippi and Texas)

== Description ==
=== Adult ===
Male, female. Forewing length 3.1-5.7 mm. Head: frons shining ochreous-white, vertex and neck tufts shining greyish brown with some reddish reflection, laterally and medially lined white, collar brown; labial palpus first segment very short, white, second segment three-quarters of the length of third, greyish brown with white longitudinal lines laterally and ventrally, third segment white, laterally lined dark brown; scape dark brown with a white anterior line, white ventrally, antenna from greyish brown in basal half, to shining dark grey in apical half, a white line from base to one-third, distal half interrupted, the apical section can be white, greyish white or dark grey, preceding by two, more or less distinct, white rings, especially in male specimens the white markings on the antennae are often greyish white and narrower than in female specimens. Thorax and tegulae greyish brown, thorax with a white median line, tegulae lined white inwardly. Legs: dark brown, femora of midleg and hindleg shining ochreous, foreleg with a white line on tibia and tarsal segments, tibiae of midleg and hindleg with white oblique basal and medial lines and white apical rings, tarsal segments of midleg and hindleg dorsally white, spurs brown on outside, white on inside. Forewing greyish brown, five white lines in the basal area, a short costal from before one-half to the transverse fascia, a subcostal from base to two-fifths or one-third, bending from costa at distal third, but occasionally it reaches almost or completely the transverse fascia, the white medial line can be complete from base to the transverse fascia, but more often it starts from just beyond base or well away from it and does not reach fully the transverse fascia, a subdorsal from two-fifths to the transverse fascia, a narrow dorsal from base and reaches from one-quarter to one-third, but sometimes almost to the transverse fascia, a yellow transverse fascia beyond the middle with a small basal protrusion and a larger apical protrusion, the latter can vary from small to very large, almost occupying the whole apical area, the transverse fascia bordered at the inner side by two tubercular pale golden metallic subcostal and dorsal spots, the subcostal spot outwardly edged by a patch of blackish brown scales, the dorsal spot nearer apex, the position of the inner tubercular spots vary, both can be at the edge of the transverse fascia, but more often only the subcostal spot is at the edge and the dorsal is surrounded by the yellow scales of the transverse fascia, occasionally both inner spots are free and surrounded by yellow scales, when free the dorsal spot is inwardly edged by a small patch of blackish brown scales, bordered at the outer edge by a similarly coloured, but smaller, costal and dorsal spot, opposite each other, sometimes one spot or both spots are inwardly lined brown or blackish brown, both outer costal and dorsal spot outwardly edged by a white costal and dorsal streak respectively, a shining white apical line connected to the apical protrusion, cilia greyish brown, paler towards dorsum. Hindwing shining pale grey, cilia pale ochreous. Underside: forewing shining greyish brown, white costal streak indistinctly and white apical line distinctly visible, hindwing shining pale grey. Abdomen dorsally shining ochreous-yellow, segment seven white, ventrally shining white, anal tuft white.

=== Larva ===
Body yellow, head and prothoracic plate very pale brown, anal plate almost colourless, thoracic legs transparent.

=== Pupa ===
Shining dark brown.

== Biology ==
The larvae feed on Schizachyrium scoparium. They mine the leaves of their host plant. The mine starts as a narrow gallery near the midrib on the upperside of the leaf. The linear mine follows the midrib for quite a while, gradually widening until it occupies half the leaf from the midrib to the edge, before the top of the leaf the larva passes the midrib and starts feeding downwardly. So far the whole mine is filled with frass. The lower and final part of the mine is without frass and walls are lined with silk. Pupation takes place in this part with the pupa in upwards position and the cremaster firmly attached to the silk lining. When emerging the adult leaves the mine through a semi-circular slit. Adults have been collected in June and July in Michigan, in southern states of the United States from April to May and in August–September, in Brazil in March to May and in December. Larvae from Michigan collected in August hibernated inside the mines and emerged in May–June the following year. This gives the indication that the species is univoltine in the north, but bivoltine in the southern United States. In Brazil the species is probably multivoltine.
