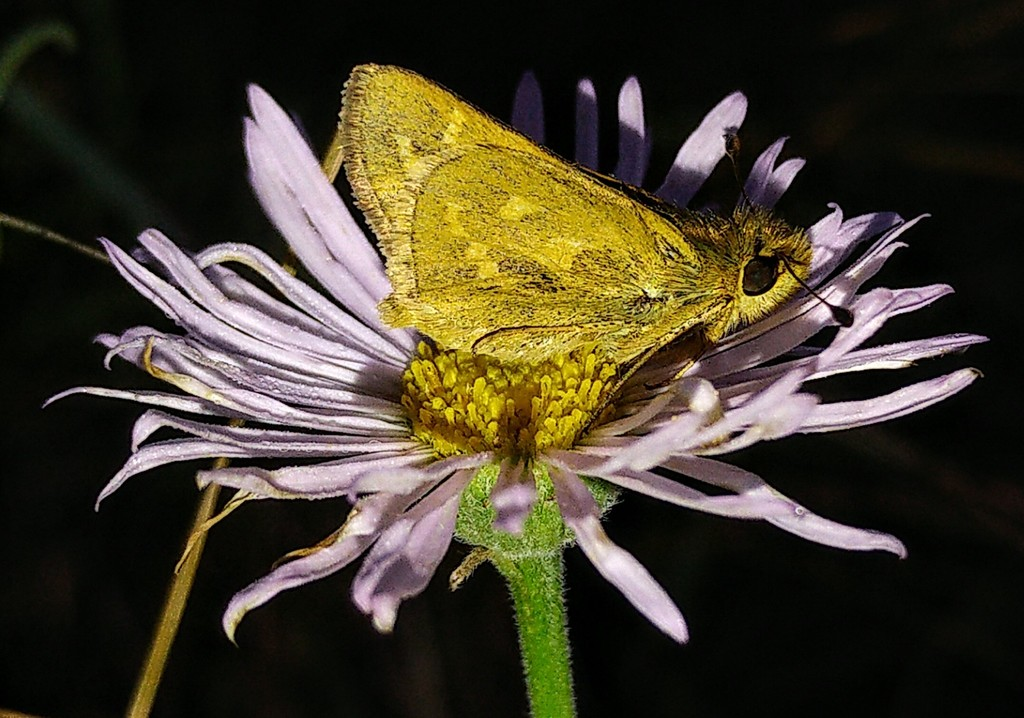

Scientific classification
- Kingdom: Animalia
- Phylum: Arthropoda
- Class: Insecta
- Order: Lepidoptera
- Family: Hesperiidae
- Genus: Hesperia
- Species: H. assiniboia

Binomial name
- Hesperia assiniboia (Lyman, 1892)

Synonyms
- Erynnis comma assiniboia Dyar, 1903; Hesperia comma assiniboia

= Hesperia assiniboia =

Plains skipper

Species of butterfly

Hesperia assiniboia, the plains skipper, is a butterfly of the family Hesperiidae.

It is found in the Canadian Prairie provinces and into the northern Great Plains states. Its habitats include northern shortgrass prairies and aspen parkland.

The wingspan is 21–30 mm. The flight period is from mid-July to early September.

The larvae feed on needlegrass (Stipa species), June grass (Koeleria cristata), and blue grama (Bouteloua gracilis). Adults feed on nectar from flowers such as asters, goldenrods, and blazingstar.
