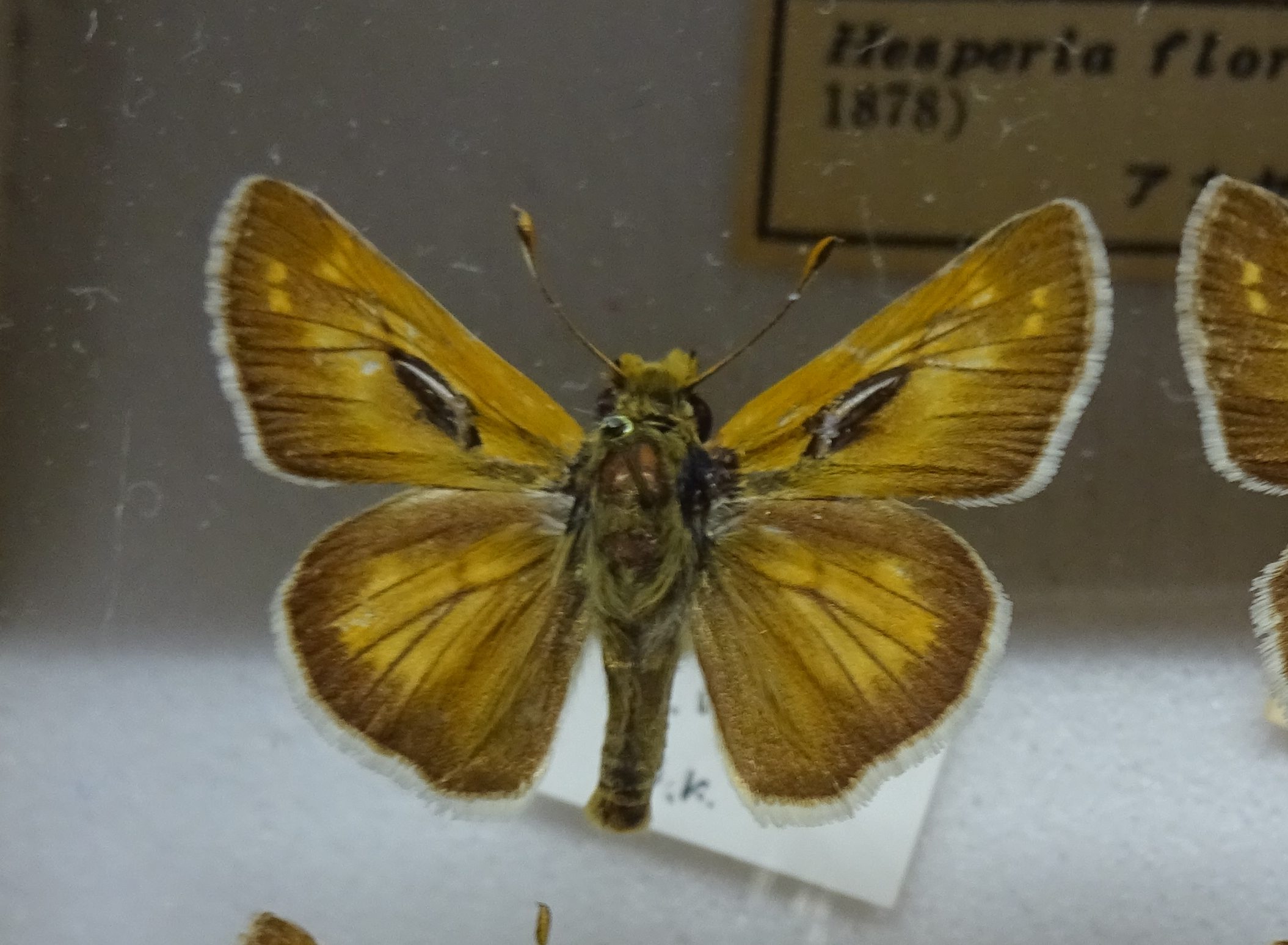

Scientific classification
- Kingdom: Animalia
- Phylum: Arthropoda
- Class: Insecta
- Order: Lepidoptera
- Family: Hesperiidae
- Genus: Hesperia
- Species: H. florinda

Binomial name
- Hesperia florinda (Butler, 1878)

Synonyms
- Pamphila florinda Butler, 1878; Pamphila mikado Leech, 1895; Pamphila repugnans Staudinger, 1892

= Hesperia florinda =

Species of butterfly

Hesperia florinda is a butterfly in the family Hesperiidae (Hesperiinae). It is found in the East Palearctic in Transbaikalia to Korea, Amur, Ussuri and Japan. The larva feeds on Carex. There is a single broods. The egg hibernates. Hesperia florinda was previously a subspecies of Hesperia comma.

== Subspecies ==
- Hesperia florinda florinda
- Hesperia florinda rozhkovi Kurentzov, 1970 (Transbaikalia)
