= Indian skipper =

Indian skipper may refer to:

- Spialia galba, a butterfly
- Euphlyctis cyanophlyctis, a frog
- Hesperia sassacus, a skipper butterfly
