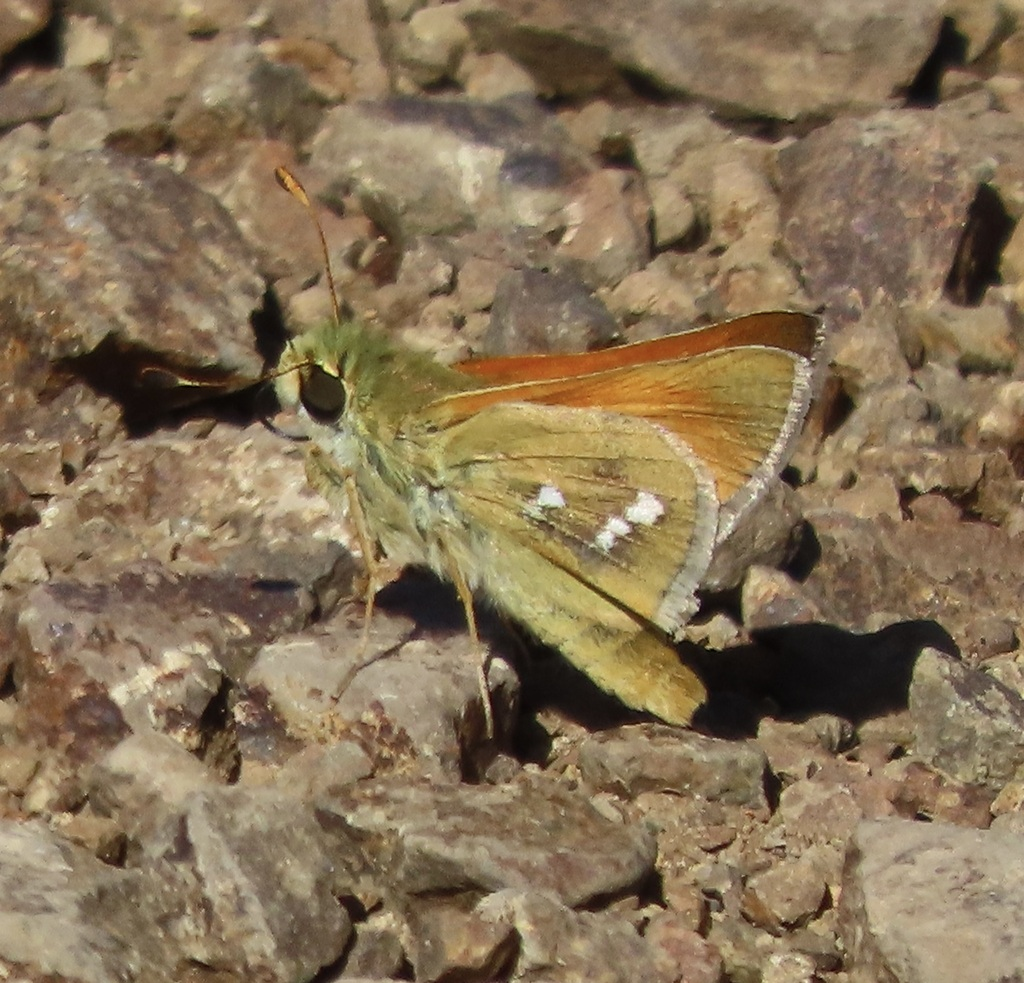

Conservation status
- Apparently Secure (NatureServe)

Scientific classification
- Kingdom: Animalia
- Phylum: Arthropoda
- Class: Insecta
- Order: Lepidoptera
- Family: Hesperiidae
- Genus: Hesperia
- Species: H. columbia

Binomial name
- Hesperia columbia (Scudder, 1872)

Synonyms
- Pamphila california W. G. Wright, 1905; Thymelicus erynnioides Dyar, 1907

= Hesperia columbia =

Species of butterfly

Hesperia columbia, the Columbian skipper, is a species of grass skipper in the butterfly family Hesperiidae. It is found in North America.

The MONA or Hodges number for Hesperia columbia is 4026.
