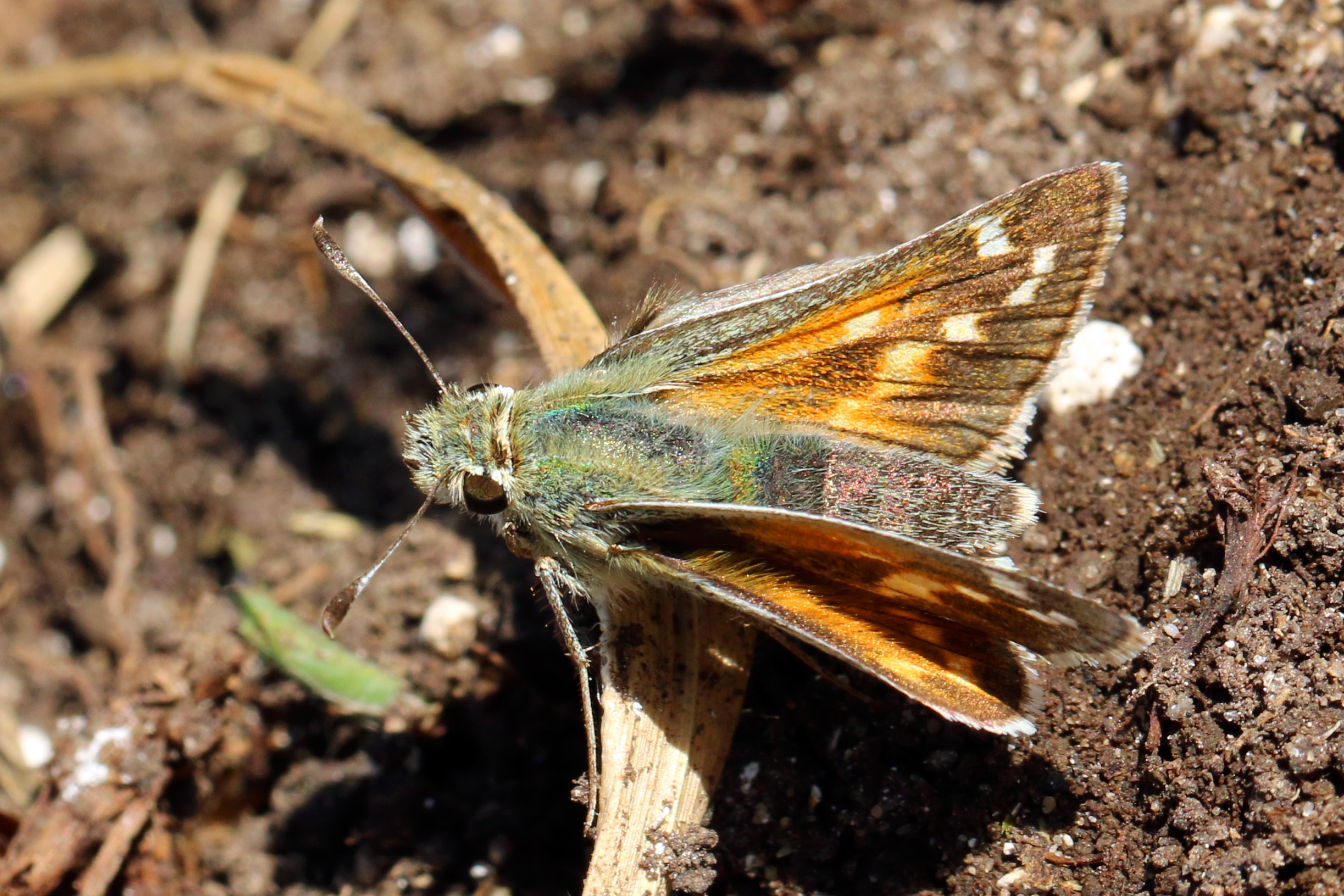
- Female
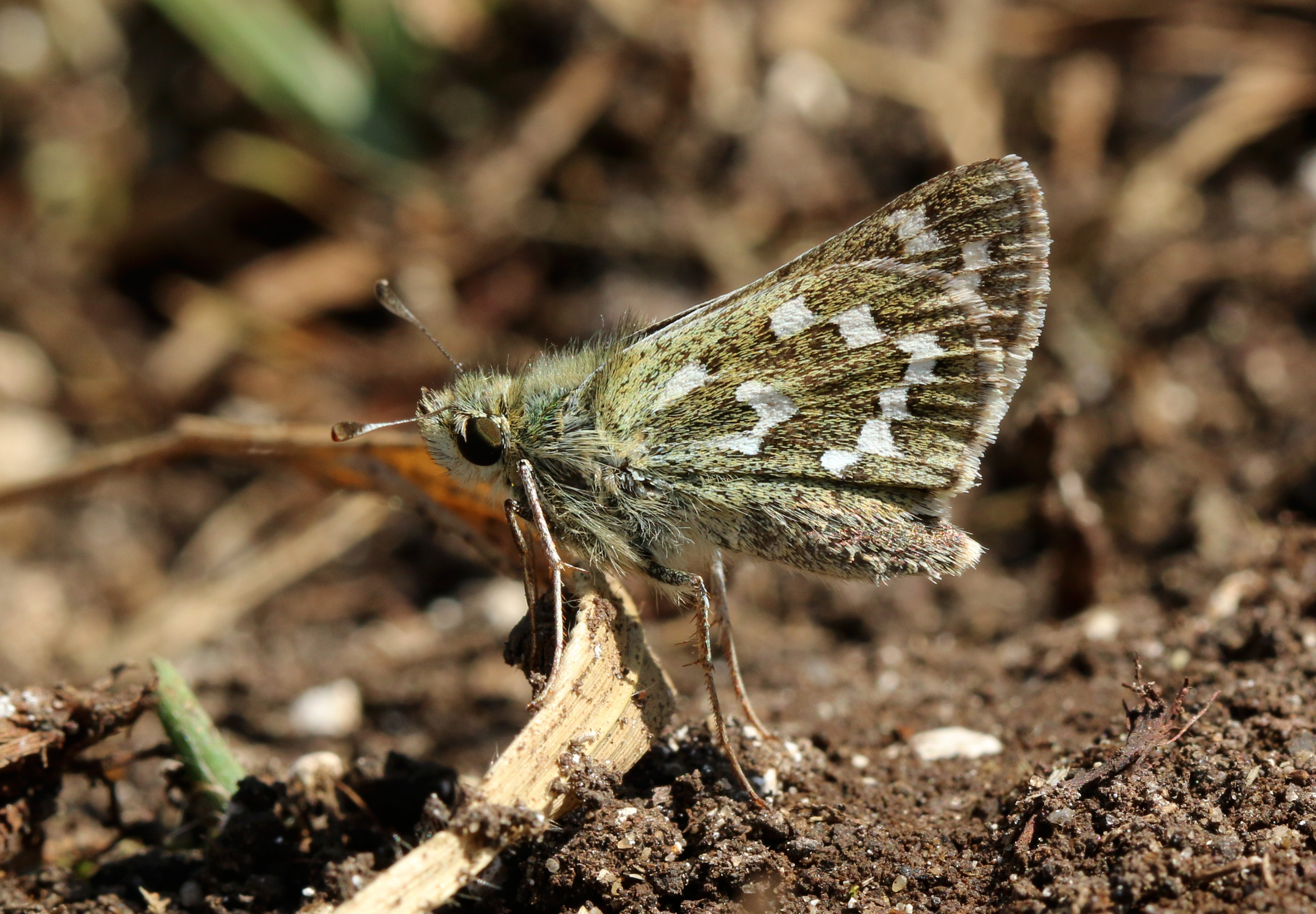
- Female underside, Aston Rowant, Oxfordshire

Conservation status
- Secure (NatureServe)

Scientific classification
- Kingdom: Animalia
- Phylum: Arthropoda
- Clade: Pancrustacea
- Class: Insecta
- Order: Lepidoptera
- Family: Hesperiidae
- Genus: Hesperia
- Species: H. comma

Binomial name
- Hesperia comma (Linnaeus, 1758)

Subspecies
- See text

Synonyms
- Papilio comma Linnaeus, 1758

= Hesperia comma =

Species of butterfly

Hesperia comma, the silver-spotted skipper or common branded skipper, is a butterfly of the family Hesperiidae. The species is known as silver-spotted skipper in Europe and common branded skipper in North America where the butterfly Epargyreus clarus, a spread-winged skipper, also has the common name of "Silver-Spotted Skipper". Originally the species was known as the Pearl Skipper but as time went on the name Silver-Spotted Skipper began being ascribed to it more frequently.

There are numerous subspecies spread throughout the world in Asia, Europe, and North America. The species has at least 15 subspecies in North America. In the UK they are rare, usually only found in the chalk hills of the Southern UK and are believed to have arrived in the UK either in the Late Glacial Period or the Holocene. As adults they have white tips with yellowish-white spots. They typically live for a year with most of their life spend overwintering as eggs for 7 months until temperatures warm in the spring. The larvae typically grow up in grazed areas with not too much overgrown vegetation and feed on host plants such as Sheep's Fescues (Festuca ovina). The larvae form tents made of silk and grass blades and as they pupate form cocoon-like structures out of the same materials near the ground. They emerge as adults in July through September. In the UK the species was facing decline, however due to restoration efforts and global warming their populations have begun to grow again.

== Appearance ==
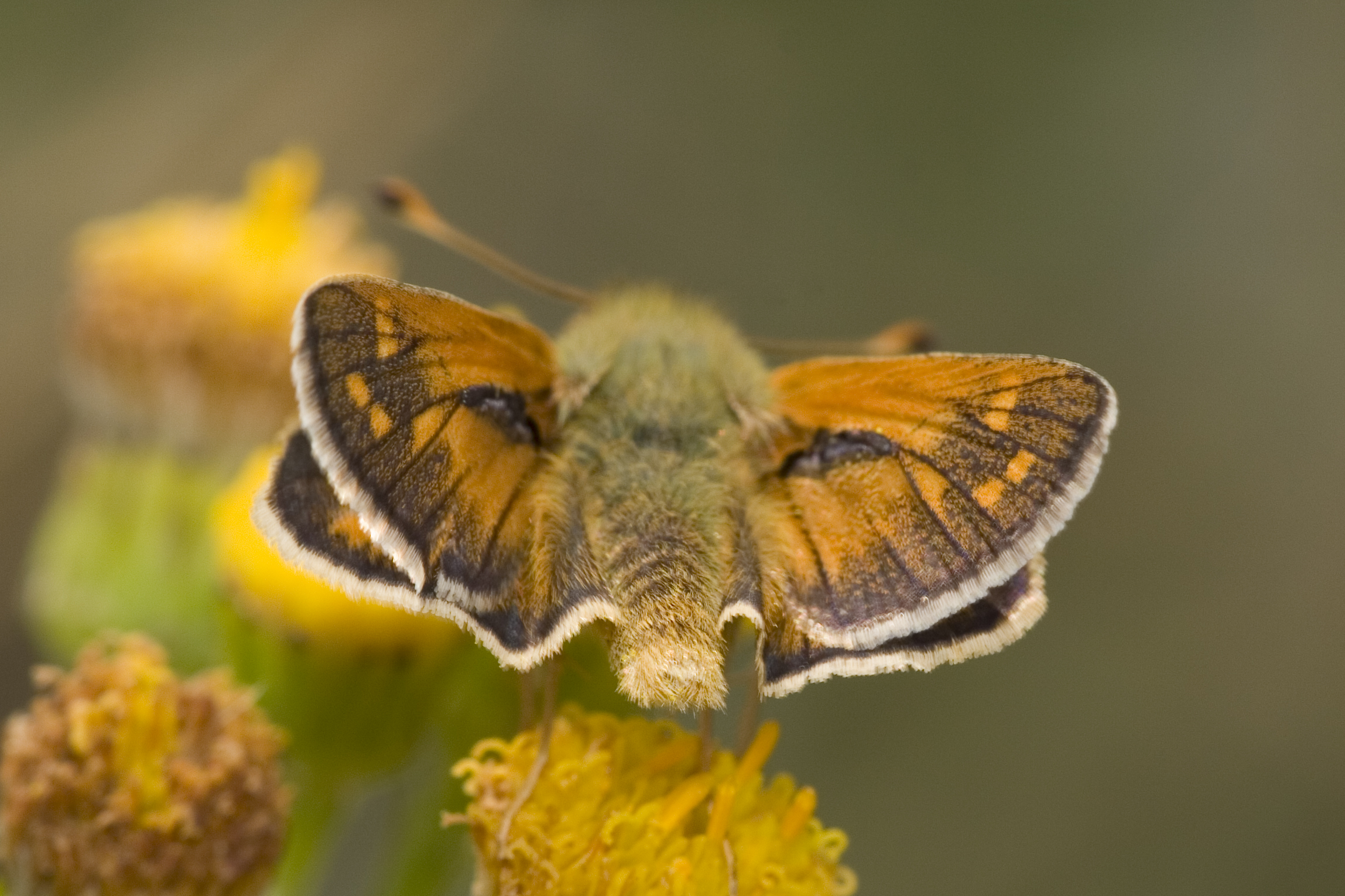
Male

Often confused with the Large skipper Ochlodes sylvanus, this species is easily distinguished by the numerous white spots on the underside hindwings, and the tips of the upper forewings tend to be darker than those of the Large Skipper. The upper side is very similar to the Large Skipper however its spots are often more yellow. The dorsal side of the wings typically are orange and dark brown on the edge of the wings. The ventral side is often a green or olive color. The white spots are slightly more pale on females. Females tend to be larger than the males. While its wings are the most notable feature, the thorax and abdomen actually make up 70% of the body mass of most specimens. The thorax mass allows the butterflies to have more flight muscles permitting them to fly between habitat patches separated by large distances.

== Distribution ==
The silver-spotted skipper prefers warm calcareous sites and has a wide distribution as far south as North Africa, northwards throughout Europe to the Arctic and eastwards across Asia to China and Japan. In the UK they are only found in chalk downlands and are difficult to find outside of certain regions in the South. In North America the species is mostly concentrated to the west coast as the Sierra Nevada and Transverse Ranges act as barriers making it difficult for populations to migrate east.

== Taxonomy ==
Silver-Spotted Skippers belong to the genus Hesperia of the family Hesperiidae. Hesperia colorado was once considered a subspecies of Hesperia comma. Later studies found that Hesperia colorado was its own unique species leading to many subspecies once under Hesperia comma to be moved to the new species Hesperia colorado.

== Genome and genetic diversity ==
Hesperia comma's genome sequence is 525.3 megabases. Gene annotation found that 18,725 genes code for proteins. The mitochondrial genome is 17.73 kilobases. North American populations have been found to have more genetic diversity than Eurasian populations.

=== Subspecies ===
- Hesperia comma assiniboia (Lyman 1892) – Occupies the prairies from Alberta to Manitoba and south into North Dakota.
- Hesperia comma benuncas (Oberthur 1912)
- Hesperia comma borealis (Lindsey 1942) – Labrador branded skipper. This species is only found in Labrador in Canada.
- Hesperia comma catena (Staudinger 1861)
- Hesperia comma dimila (Moore 1874)
- Hesperia comma greenhornensis (Scott 2021) – Found in southern Sierra Nevada in California.
- Hesperia comma hulbirti (Lindsey 1939) – Hulbirt's branded skipper. This species has so far only been observed in the Olympic National Park in Washington.
- Hesperia comma laurentina (Lyman 1892) – Laurentian branded skipper. Found in the northeastern U.S. and eastern Canada.
- Hesperia comma lena Korshunov & P. Gorbunov 1995
- Hesperia comma manitoba (Scudder 1874) – Manitoba branded skipper. Found primarily in the Pacific Northwest of America. Particularly Alaska south to Washington and east to the Great Slave Lake region in Canada, northwestern Wyoming and Colorado.
- Hesperia comma mixta (Alpheraky 1881)
- Hesperia comma pallida (Staudinger 1901)
- Hesperia comma planula (Korshunov 1995)
- Hesperia comma shandura (Evans 1949)
- Hesperia comma sushinki (Korshunov 1995)
- Hesperia comma tildeni (Freeman 1956) – Tilden's Skipper. Found in the inner coastal ranges of central California from Lake County to San Luis Obispo.
- Hesperia comma yosemite (Leussler 1933) – Occupies the western slopes of the Sierra Nevada in California.

== Life cycle ==
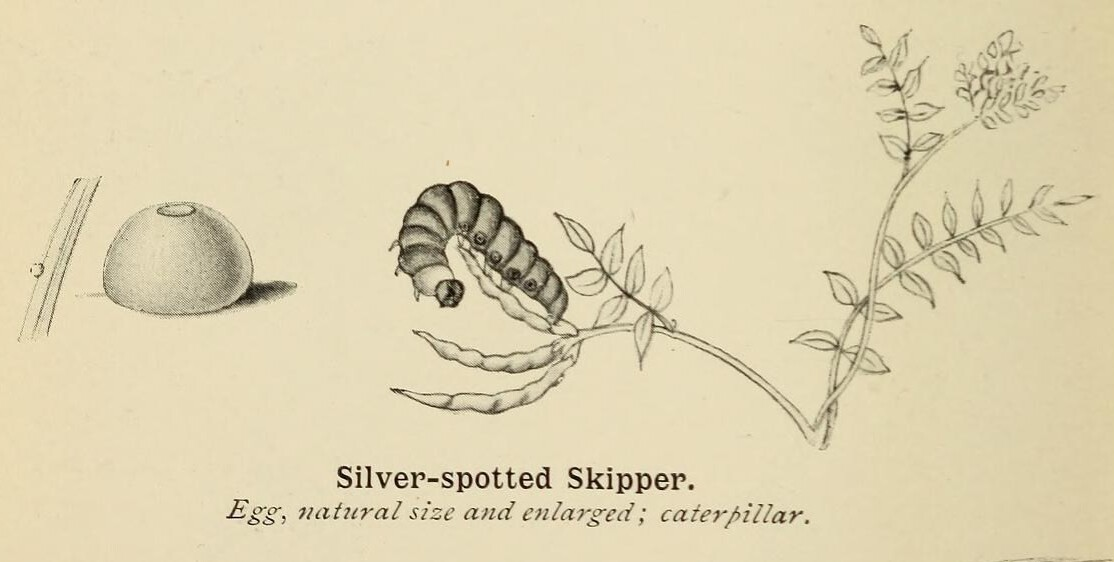
Early life stages

=== Egg ===
Females are univoltine, laying eggs only once a year. Females lay eggs during August and September in areas with short turf, up to 4 cm, usually around ant mounds, such as those of Lasius flavus. The ant hills provide a more open space with less dense vegetation, providing a favorable environment for the larvae. Often since the eggs are laid in heavily grazed areas many eggs are eaten by animals. Females also tend to choose areas with warm microclimates as larvae prefer warm temperatures. Typically eggs are laid on host plants such as Festuca ovina (Sheep's Fescues) in the UK. Outside the UK, females in places such as Oregon in the U.S. lay their eggs on Festuca roemeri (Roemer's Fescues) plants that are around 1-5 cm tall. A female will typically only lay one egg per leaf. Sometimes a great number of eggs can be found on one host plant. The eggs are a pale cream color or pearl white. This species overwinters as an egg for around 7 months and hatches in March through April.

=== Larvae ===
The larvae construct small tent-like structures from leaf blades, grass, and silk from where they feed. These structures are usually formed around the host plant. Unlike other larvae they will not eat their eggshells. At full size the larvae are 25 mm, have a black head, an olive body, and black warts with amber spines. The tent-like structure usually has one larvae each but multiple larvae have been found in one tent before. The larvae have an anal comb that lets the larvae discard feces far from the tent. The larvae can sense disturbances such as the hot breath of animals to help them detect predators and grazing animals. If a disturbance is detected the larvae will retreat and wiggle to attempt to get away from the source of the disturbance. Before pupation, the larvae will become more mobile and wander considerable distances. The larval stage typically lasts 100 days.

=== Pupae ===
Their pupation strategy is slightly different from other skippers. Their pupae are attached to their substrate by a girth, head-, and tail-hook (or cremaster) surrounded by a cocoon-like structure made out of silk and grass, that is often found low to or on the ground. The pupae are usually 15 mm long, an olive green color, with black marks and are slightly yellow towards the ventral side. Pupation takes 10 to 14 days.

=== Adult ===
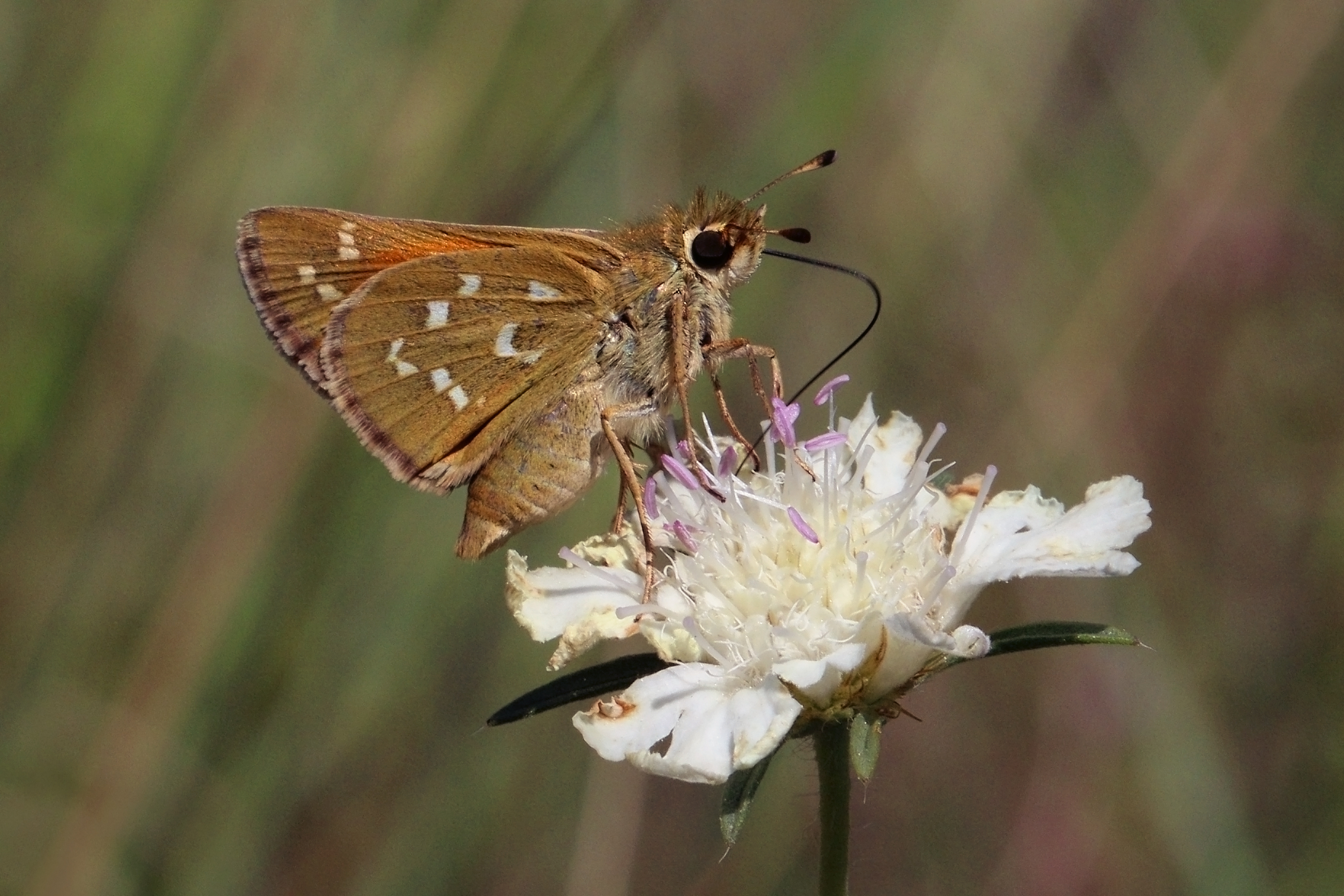
Silver Skipper Adult

Butterflies often emerge in a single generation from late July to mid September. Like any univoltine butterflies, the males take flight before the females. Males will search for females by perching on low vegetation and pursuing any flying insect. If a female is found and she is a virgin, the male will attempt to force the female into the vegetation to mate. If the female is not willing to mate, she will jerk her wings and crawl away from the male. If another male is found the two will fight for territory in an upward, spiraling flight. After mating, females will seek out oviposition sites and after laying each egg will feed before laying another.

== Host plants and food sources ==
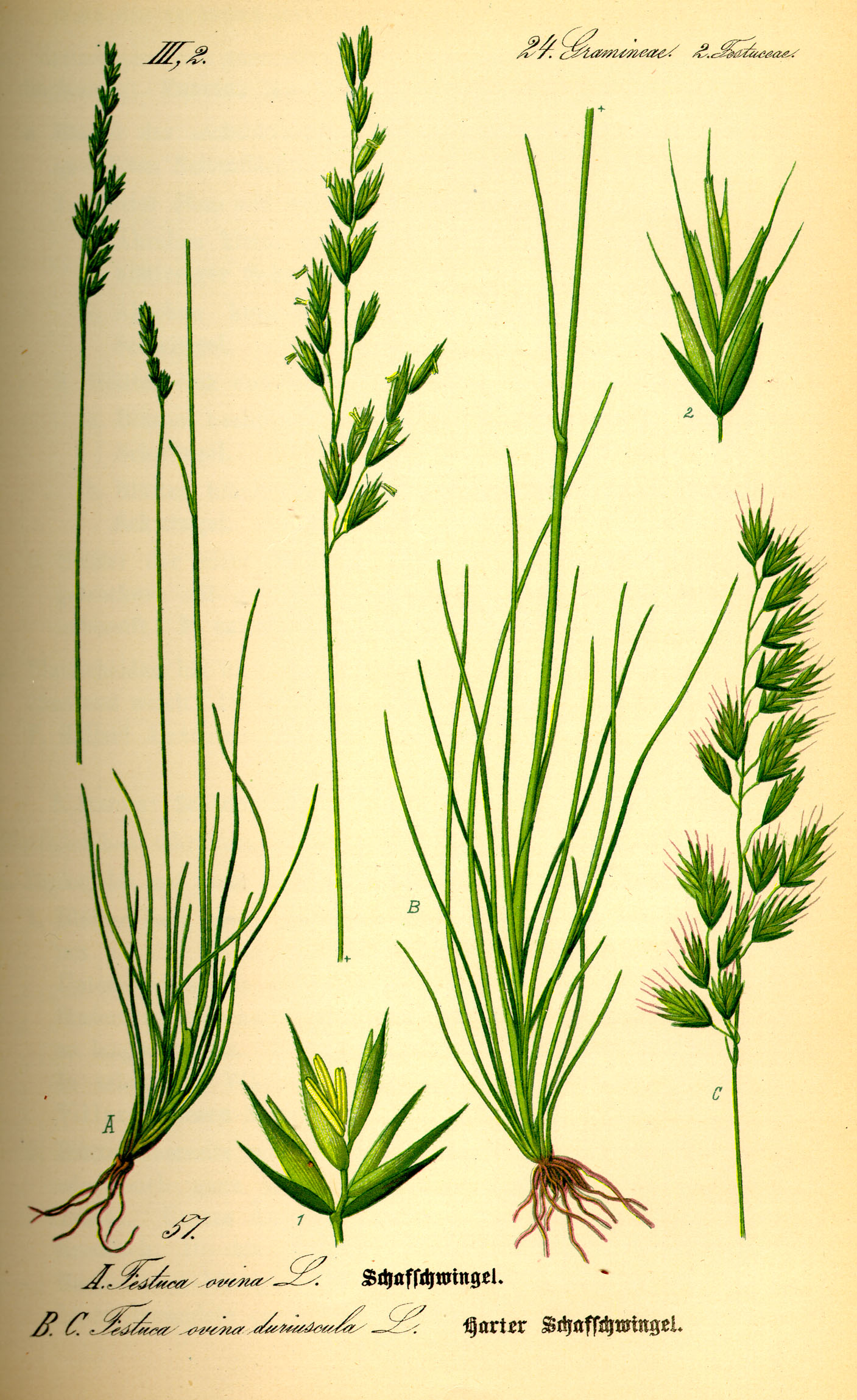
Sheep's Fescues (Festuca ovina)

Sheep's Fescues (Festicua ovina) and F. liviensis are used as a host plant for larvae, while adults get their nectar from different plants. In the UK the adults have been noticed to feed on Asteraceae, Dipsaceae, Cirsium acaualon (Stemless Thistle), Centaurea scabiosa (Greater Knapweed), Hypericum (St. John's Wart), Trifolium (Clover), Lotus corniculatus (Common bird's foot trefoil), Campanula rotundifolia (Bellflower), Gentianella amarella (Autumn Gentian), Euphrasia (Eyebright), Origanum vulgare (Oregano), Prunella vulgaris (Self-Heal), and Echium vulgare (Viper's-bugloss). However of all these plants, usually Compositae and Dipsaceae are the plants most commonly fed on by these butterflies. The species also nectars on thistles, Scabiosa, and hawkbit.

== Activity ==
The species flies rapidly, usually hovering low to the ground often making stops. They can change their direction mid-flight sharply. Their flight is one of the fastest of their group. Often adults are feeding or basking in the sunlight. They have been observed to be fond of perching on low-lying thistles. When they reach a temperature below 20 °C they become less active.

== Origin in the UK ==
It's theorized the species first began migrating to the UK either during the Late Glacial Zones I and II (The Late Glacial Period) or during the Holocene. It's believed the species arrived in the UK from France and Spain by crossing a land bridge. According to the Late Glacial Zone theory, even though the climate during the period often led to a decrease in available habitat there was a great range of host and foodplants within open habitats that allowed them and other butterfly species to begin colonizing the British Isles. During this time areas such as the western Scottish Isles likely did not have populations of the species due to sea barriers, created by isostatic depression, preventing migration to the area.

However in the Late Glacial Zone III period the climate began to become colder driving many species out of the British Isles possibly including Hesperia comma. There is however some evidence found in Late Glacial pollen spectra that suggests some colonies of Hesperia comma could have lived in the South-Eastern English woodland fringe and Channel Islands.

== Naming history ==
The butterfly was first described in the UK in 1666 by Merrett. At this time it had no scientific name. Then the scientific name comma was given by Linnaeus to a specimen that resembled both this species and the Large Skipper. The first common name given to a specimen now agreed to be this species was the Pearl Skipper. Later the name was changed to the August Skipper but in 1772 the name was changed back to the Pearl Skipper. The name Silver Spotted Skipper was ascribed in 1803 but many experts preferred the Pearl Skipper name. As time went on, the Silver Spotted Skipper name become more favored by authors and experts.

== Recent resurgence in the UK ==
The species population began going down in the UK due to decreasing habitat. A decrease in natural grazing and wild rabbit populations allowed more fields to become overgrown which are an unfavorable environment for oviposition. Additionally, agriculture destroys habitat butterflies use and equipment can destroy ant mounds which often are used as oviposition sites.

Concerted conservation efforts in the UK, backed by government agencies, have seen the population rising in certain areas. A reintroduction of domestic livestock and rabbits during the 1970s and 1980s have helped to restore suitable habitats for populations. The widespread growth of conservation management for species rich-calcareous grasslands have also helped Hesperia comma's populations in the UK as the species preferred habitat is preserved. Actions by the Department for Environment, Farming, and Rural Affairs to reduce harmful agricultural practices in the area such as use of pesticides and promoting traditional animal grazing has also benefited Hesperia comma. At least 144 habitat patches have increased in quality however colonization by new populations have been limited with most colonization being limited to East Sussex. Climate change has also had an unexpected effect on increasing populations in the UK. Warming climate has allowed the species to disperse into areas that were once too cold for them. The warming temperatures keep habitats warmer longer, giving females more time to find sites to lay eggs.

== Gallery ==
Crab spider (Misumena vatia) with prey

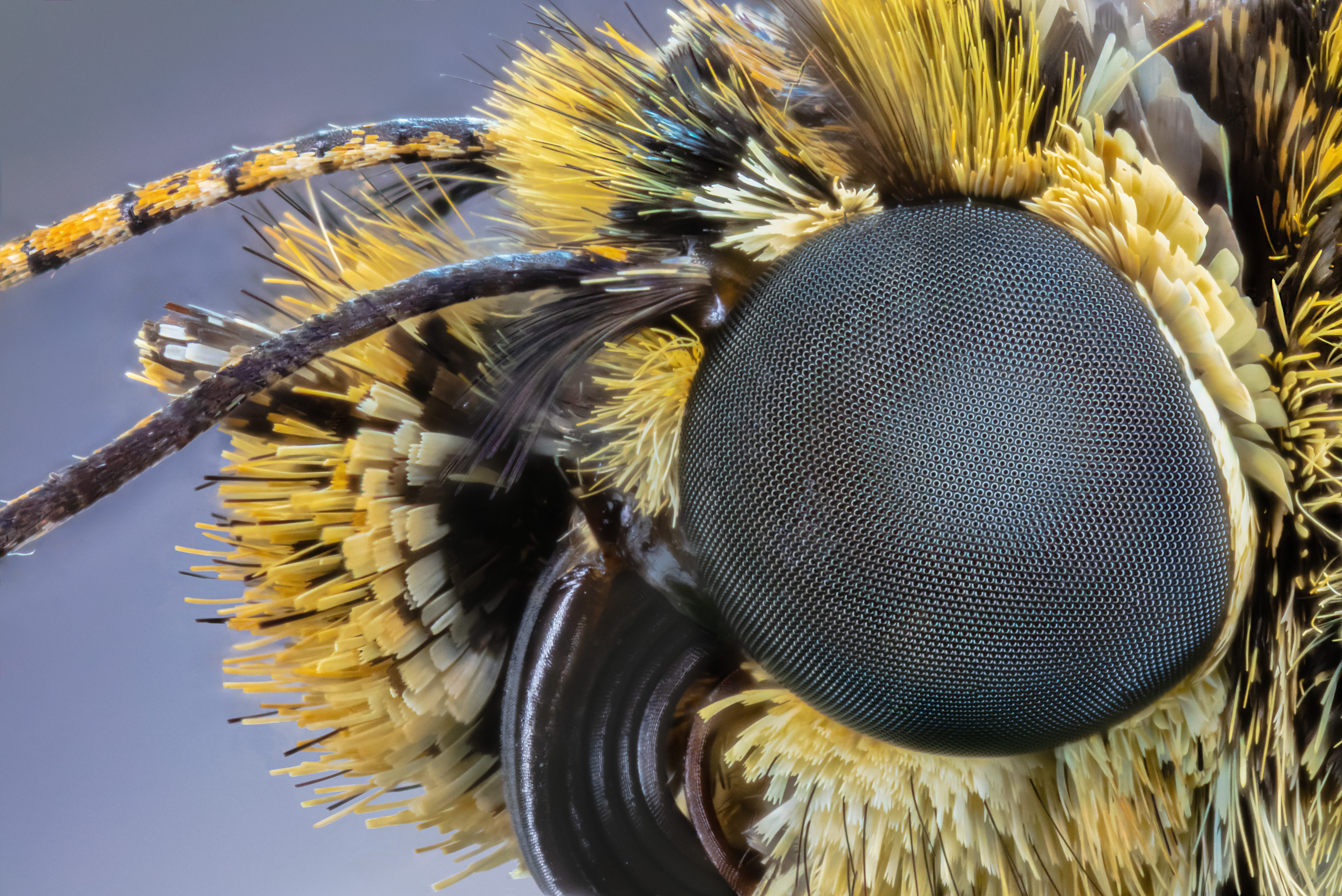
Extreme close-up of head of the Hesperia comma butterfly

== See also ==
- List of butterflies of Great Britain
- List of butterflies of Canada

== References and external links ==
- Barnett LK and Warren MS. Species action plan. Silver-spotted Skipper Hesperia comma. Butterfly conservation October 1995.
- Captain's European Butterfly guide
- Hesperia comma page The Butterflies of Norway site]
- Cirrus Digital Imaging Silver-spotted skipper aka Epargyreus clarus: reference photographs - North America
- Jim Asher et al. The Millennium Atlas of Butterflies of Britain and Ireland Oxford University Press
- Article from The Times, 15 May 2006
- The Butterfly Monitoring Scheme
- Butterfly Conservation Armenia
