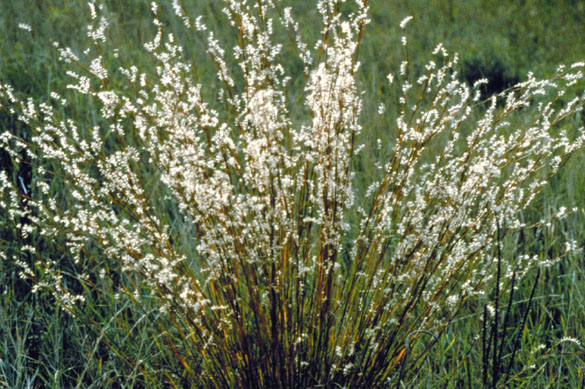
- Mature seedheads

Scientific classification
- Kingdom: Plantae
- Clade: Tracheophytes
- Clade: Angiosperms
- Clade: Monocots
- Clade: Commelinids
- Order: Poales
- Family: Poaceae
- Subfamily: Panicoideae
- Genus: Schizachyrium
- Species: S. scoparium

Binomial name
- Schizachyrium scoparium (Michx.) Nash

Synonyms
- Andropogon scoparius Michx.

= Schizachyrium scoparium =

Species of grass

Schizachyrium scoparium, commonly known as little bluestem or beard grass, is a species of North American prairie grass native to most of the contiguous United States (except California, Nevada, and Oregon) as well as a small area north of the Canada–US border and northern Mexico. It is most common in the Midwestern prairies and is one of the most abundant native plants in Texas grasslands.

Little bluestem is a perennial bunchgrass and is prominent in tallgrass prairies, along with big bluestem (Andropogon gerardi), indiangrass (Sorghastrum nutans) and switchgrass (Panicum virgatum). It is a warm-season species, meaning it employs the C_{4} photosynthetic pathway.

== Description ==
Little bluestem grows to become an upright, roundish mound of soft, bluish-green or grayish-green blades in May and June that is about two to three feet high. In July, it initiates flowering stalks, which reach four to five feet in height. In fall, it displays a coppery or mostly orange color with tints of red or purple. Sometimes it displays in some places, as in sandy soils, a redder fall color. It becomes a more orangish-bronze in winter until early spring, when it becomes more tan.

Little bluestem stems tiller within individual plants. Each tiller hierarchy is separated by age, starting from the youngest in the middle pushing the oldest tillers out to the periphery.

== Subdivisions ==
One variety, var. littorale, is native to the eastern and southern coastal strip of the United States, as well as the shores of the Great Lakes. It is adapted to sand dune habitat, and is sometimes considered a separate species, S. littorale.

== Ecology ==
Little bluestem is drought tolerant, and is a larval host to the cobweb skipper, common wood nymph, crossline skipper, Dakota skipper, dusted skipper, Indian skipper, Leonard's skipper, Ottoe skipper, and swarthy skipper.

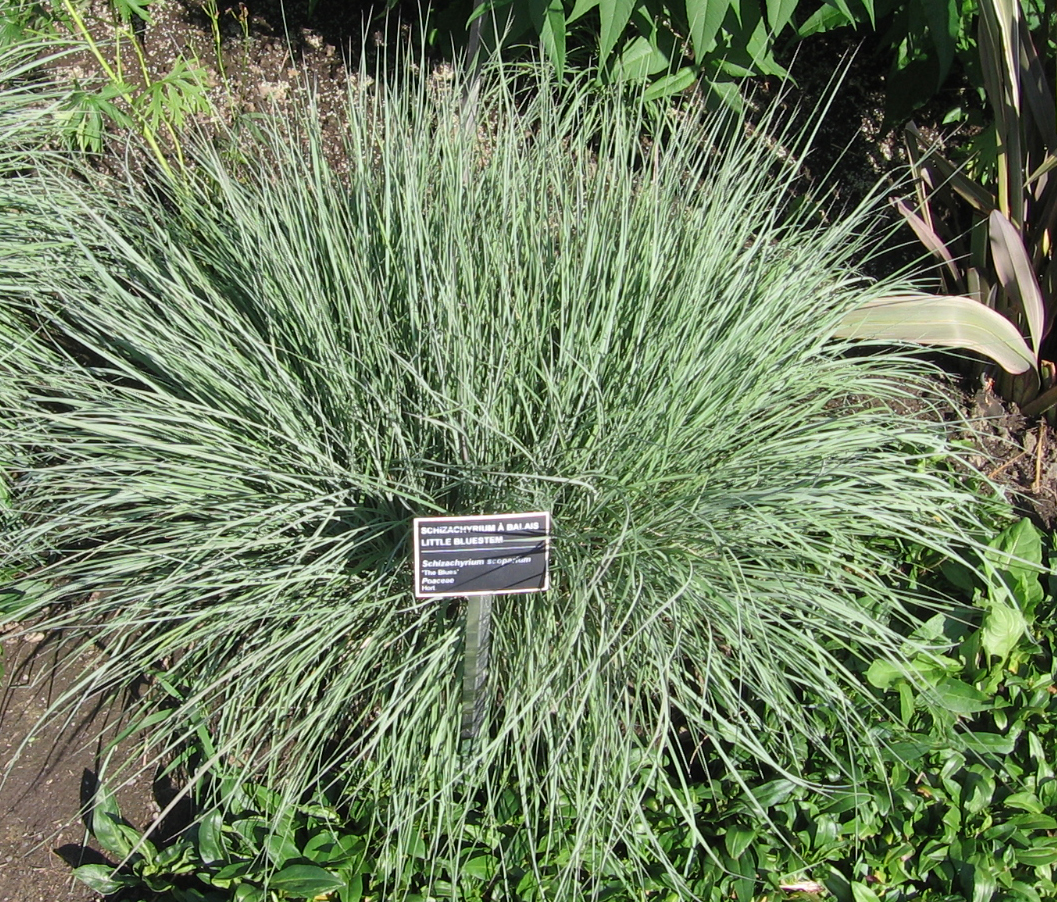

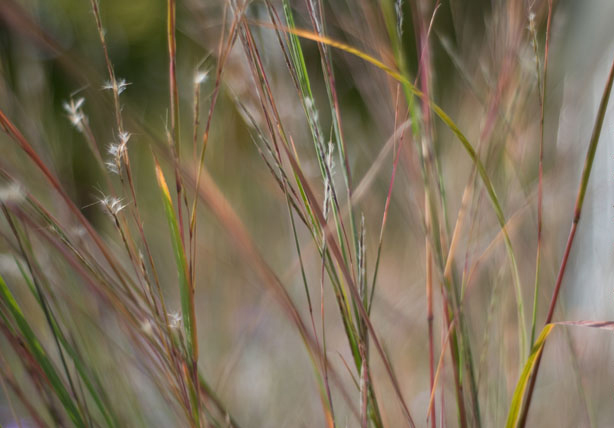

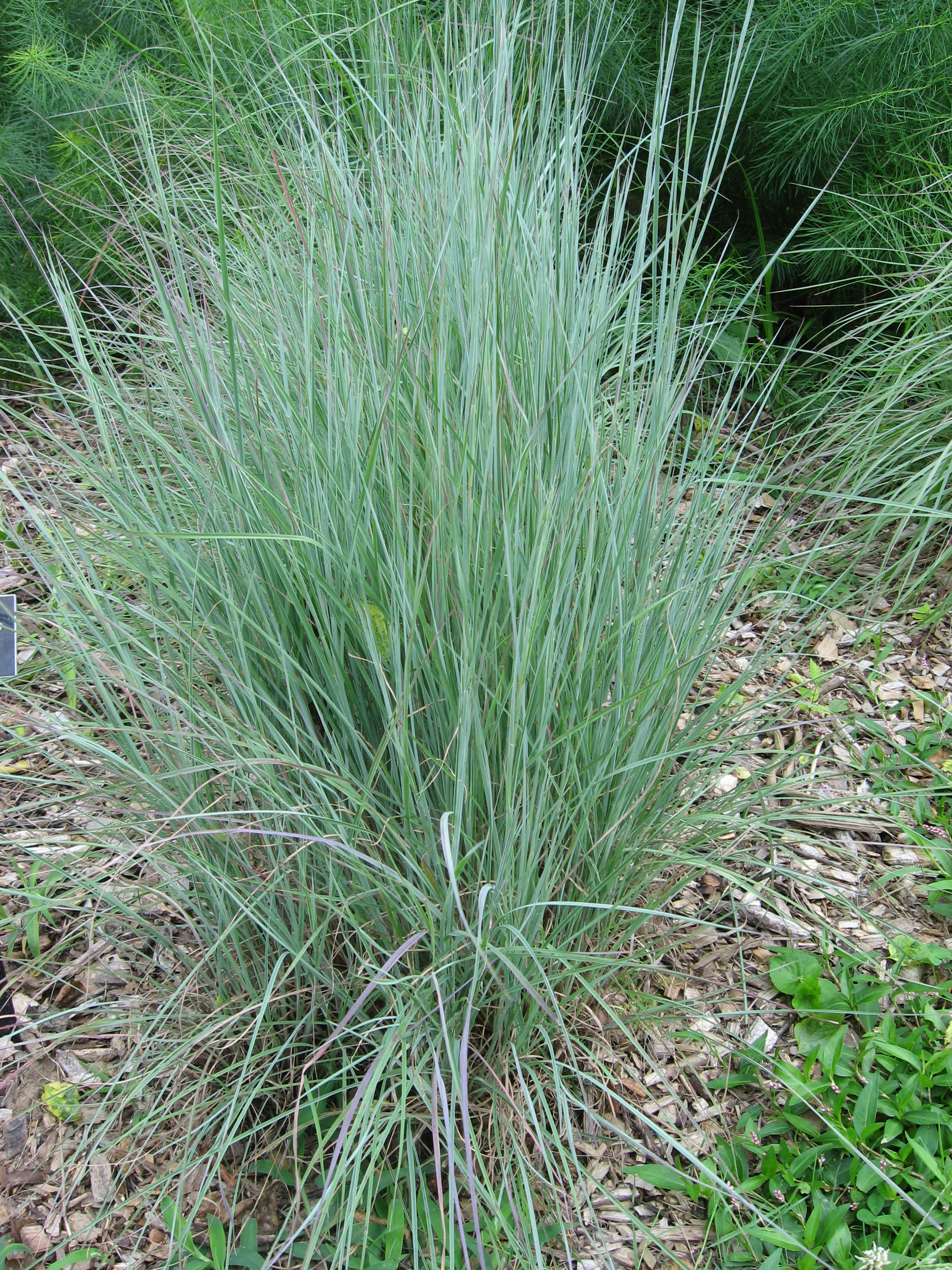

== Cultivation ==
It is recommended for USDA hardiness zones 3 to 10.

The plant grows best in full sun and on well-drained soils. It can be dug up and divided in spring, as many other perennials, for propagation or to reduce the size of an old, big plant. It can be burned in late winter or early spring in a prairie or meadow before new growth, like many American prairie grasses (big bluestem, Indian-grass, and switchgrass), which burn quickly and cleanly.

=== Cultivars ===
A number of cultivars have been developed. 'Carousel' is a compact form with especially good fall color developed by Chicagoland Grows. 'The Blues' is a selection that has bluer foliage. 'Standing Ovation' is a tight, upright form with bluer and thicker blades and sturdier stems.

== In culture ==
Little bluestem is the official state grass of Nebraska and Kansas.
