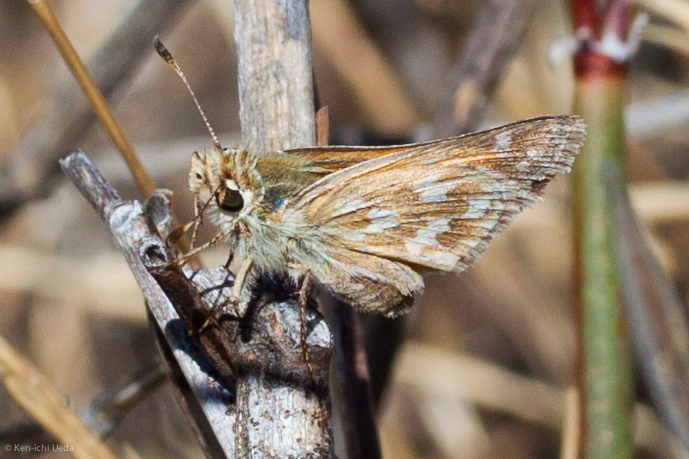

Conservation status
- Vulnerable (NatureServe)

Scientific classification
- Kingdom: Animalia
- Phylum: Arthropoda
- Clade: Pancrustacea
- Class: Insecta
- Order: Lepidoptera
- Family: Hesperiidae
- Genus: Hesperia
- Species: H. lindseyi

Binomial name
- Hesperia lindseyi (W. Holland, 1930)

= Hesperia lindseyi =

Species of butterfly

Hesperia lindseyi, commonly known as Lindsey's skipper, is a species of grass skipper in the butterfly family Hesperiidae. Other common names include the Lindsey's branded skipper and lost-egg skipper. It is found in North America.

== Subspecies ==
These five subspecies belong to the species Hesperia lindseyi:

- Hesperia lindseyi eldorado J. Emmel, T. Emmel & Mattoon in T. Emmel, 1998
- Hesperia lindseyi lindseyi (W. Holland, 1930)
- Hesperia lindseyi macneilli J. Emmel, T. Emmel & Mattoon in T. Emmel, 1998
- Hesperia lindseyi mccorklei P. Severns & D. Severns, 2005
- Hesperia lindseyi septentrionalis J. Emmel, T. Emmel & Mattoon in T. Emmel, 1998
