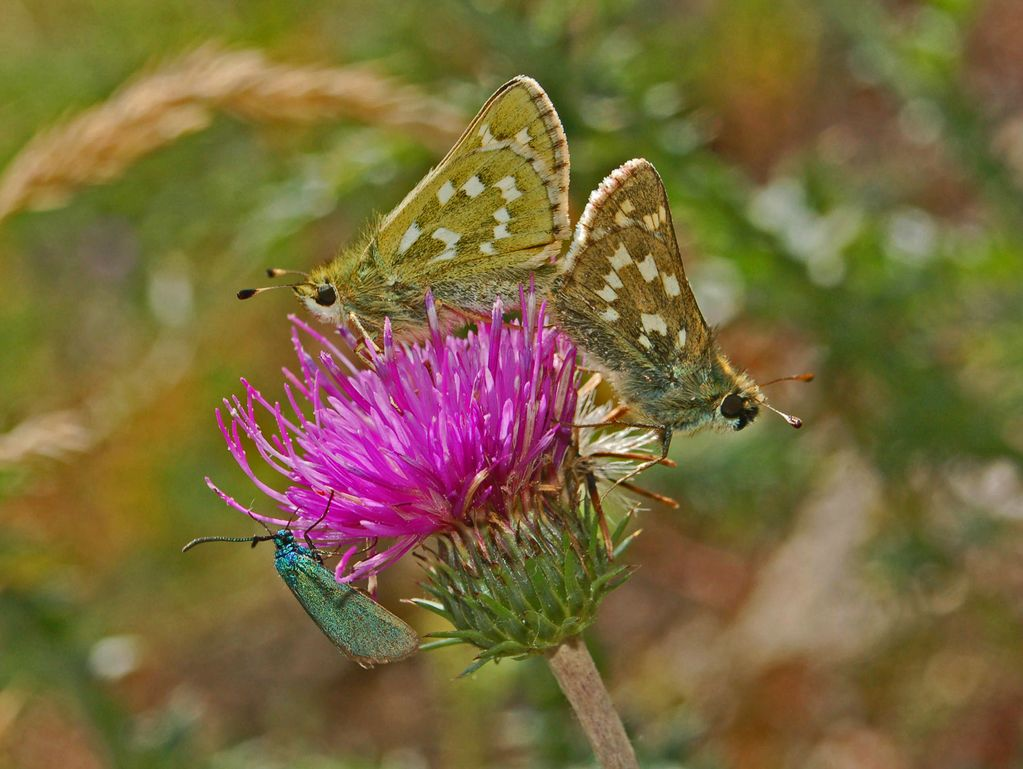
- Hesperia comma

Scientific classification
- Kingdom: Animalia
- Phylum: Arthropoda
- Class: Insecta
- Order: Lepidoptera
- Family: Hesperiidae
- Tribe: Hesperiini
- Genus: Hesperia; Fabricius, 1793

Species
- About 20 - see text

Synonyms
- Pamphila Fabricius, 1807; Diorthosus Rafinesque, 1815; Steropes Rafinesque, 1815; Phidias Rafinesque, 1815; Symmachia Sodoffsky, 1837; Ocytes Scudder, 1872; Anthomaster Scudder, 1872; Urbicola Tutt, 1905; Pamphilus Ihering, 1908

= Hesperia (butterfly) =

Genus of butterflies

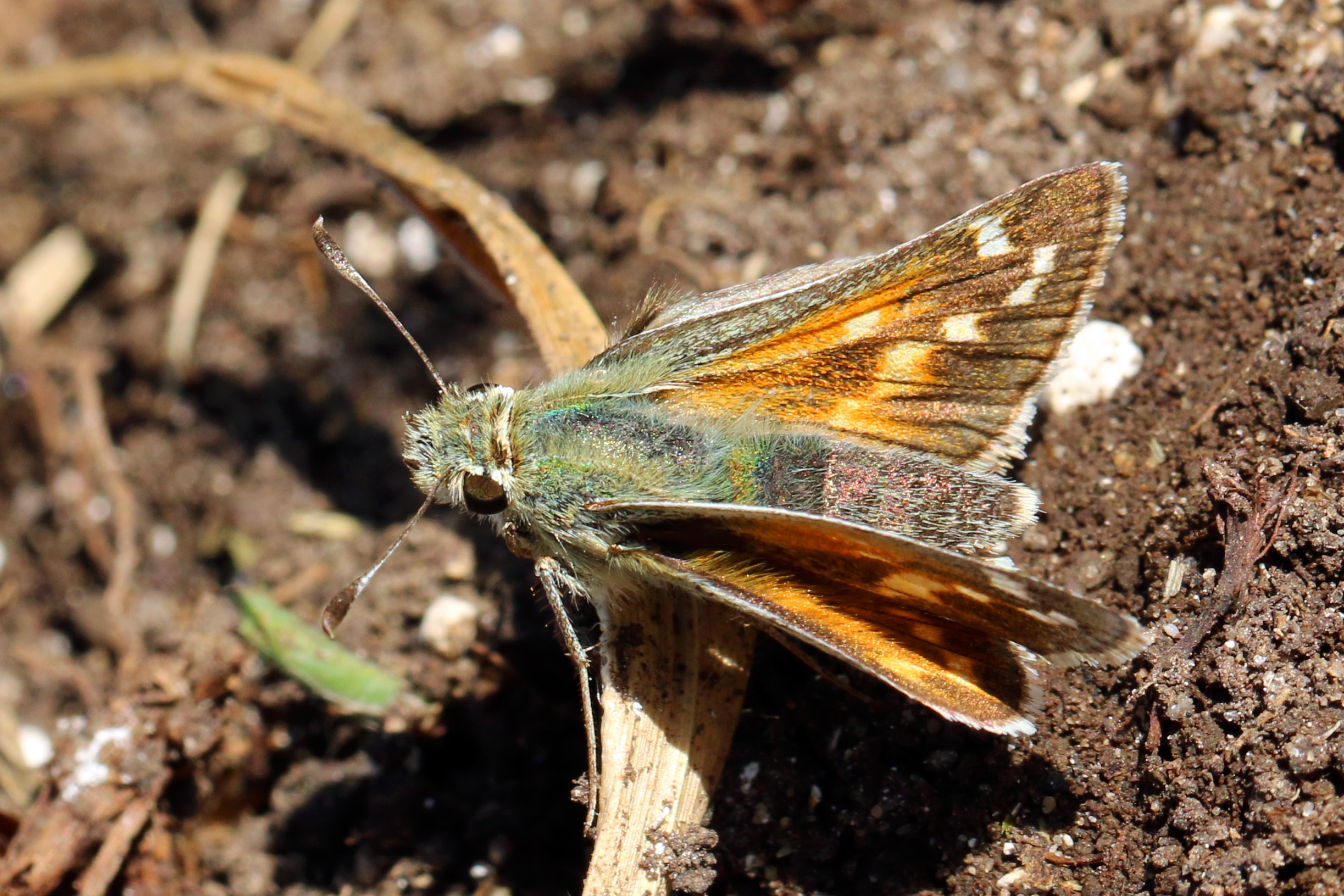
Hesperia comma female

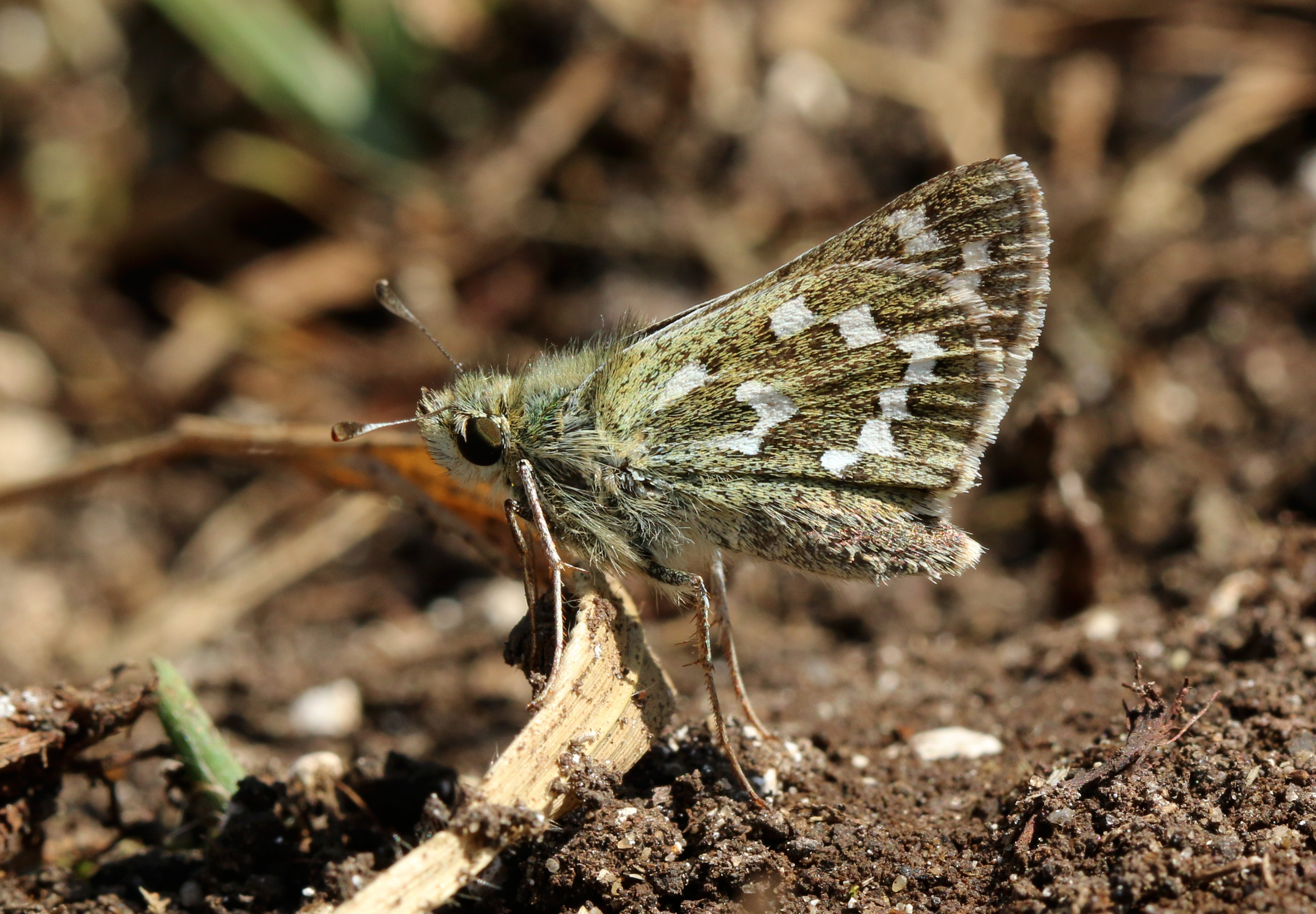
Hesperia comma female

Hesperia, the branded skippers, is a Holarctic genus in the skippers (Hesperiidae) butterfly family. Most species are endemic to North America, Hesperia comma is widespread throughout the region. H. florinda is endemic to temperate eastern Asia. H. nabokovi is endemic to Hispaniola.

Presumably, Johan Christian Fabricius named the genus for Hesperia, one of the Hesperides.

== Species ==
The following species are recognised in the genus Hesperia:

- Hesperia assiniboia (Lyman, 1892) – Plains skipper
- Hesperia attalus (W. H. Edwards, 1871) – dotted skipper – south United States
- Hesperia caucasica Riabov, 1926 Caucasus
- Hesperia colorado (Scudder, 1874) – western branded skipper
- Hesperia columbia (Scudder, 1872) – Columbian skipper – California to Southwest Oregon
- Hesperia comma (Linnaeus, 1758) – silver-spotted skipper or common branded skipper
- Hesperia dacotae (Skinner, 1911) – Dakota skipper
- Hesperia florinda (Butler, 1878)
- Hesperia juba (Scudder, 1872) – Juba skipper
- Hesperia leonardus (Harris, 1862) – Leonard's skipper
- Hesperia lindseyi (Holland, 1930) – Lindsey's skipper – Southwest Oregon, California, Southwest Arizona
- Hesperia meskei W. H. Edwards, 1877 – Meke's skipper, Dixie skipper – Texas to Florida
- Hesperia metea Scudder, 1863 – cobweb skipper
- Hesperia miriamae MacNeill, 1959 – Sierra skipper – Inyo County, California
- Hesperia nabokovi (Bell & Comstock, 1948) Hispaniola
- Hesperia nevada (Scudder, 1874) – Nevada skipper
- Hesperia ottoe W. H. Edwards, 1866 – Ottoe skipper
- Hesperia pahaska Luessler, 1938 – Pahaska skipper
- Hesperia sassacus Harris, 1862 – Indian skipper
- Hesperia uncas W. H. Edwards, 1863 – Uncas skipper
- Hesperia viridis (W. H. Edwards, 1883) – green skipper – Mexico, New Mexico
- Hesperia woodgatei (R. C. Williams, 1914) – Apache skipper – Arizona, New Mexico, South Texas, North Mexico

=== Former species ===
Many species originally described in the genus Hesperia have now been reclassified. For a list of selected former species see List of former species in the genus Hesperia.
