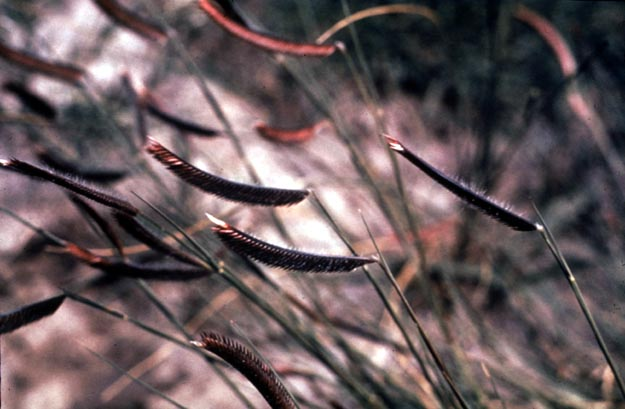

Conservation status
- Least Concern (IUCN 3.1)

- Secure (NatureServe)

Scientific classification
- Kingdom: Plantae
- Clade: Tracheophytes
- Clade: Angiosperms
- Clade: Monocots
- Clade: Commelinids
- Order: Poales
- Family: Poaceae
- Subfamily: Chloridoideae
- Genus: Bouteloua
- Species: B. gracilis

Binomial name
- Bouteloua gracilis (Willd. ex Kunth) Lag. ex Griffiths

= Bouteloua gracilis =

Blue grama

Species of grass

Bouteloua gracilis, the blue grama, is a long-lived, warm-season (C4) perennial grass, native to North America.

It is most commonly found from Alberta, Canada, east to Manitoba and south across the Rocky Mountains, Great Plains, and U.S. Midwest states, onto the northern Mexican Plateau in Mexico.

Blue grama accounts for most of the net primary productivity in the shortgrass prairie of the central and southern Great Plains. It is a green or greyish, low-growing, drought-tolerant grass with limited maintenance.

== Description ==
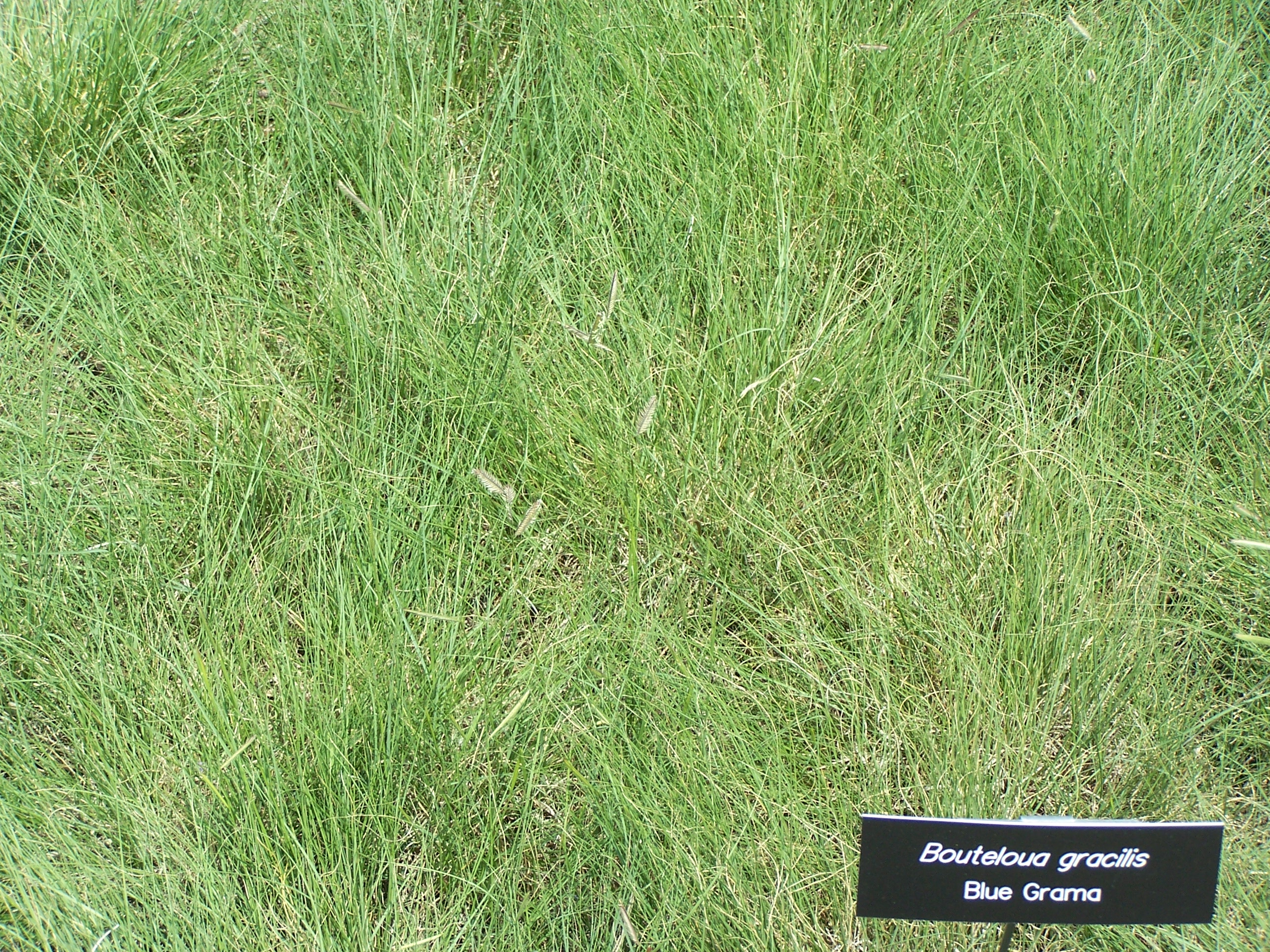
Blue grama grass in early summer

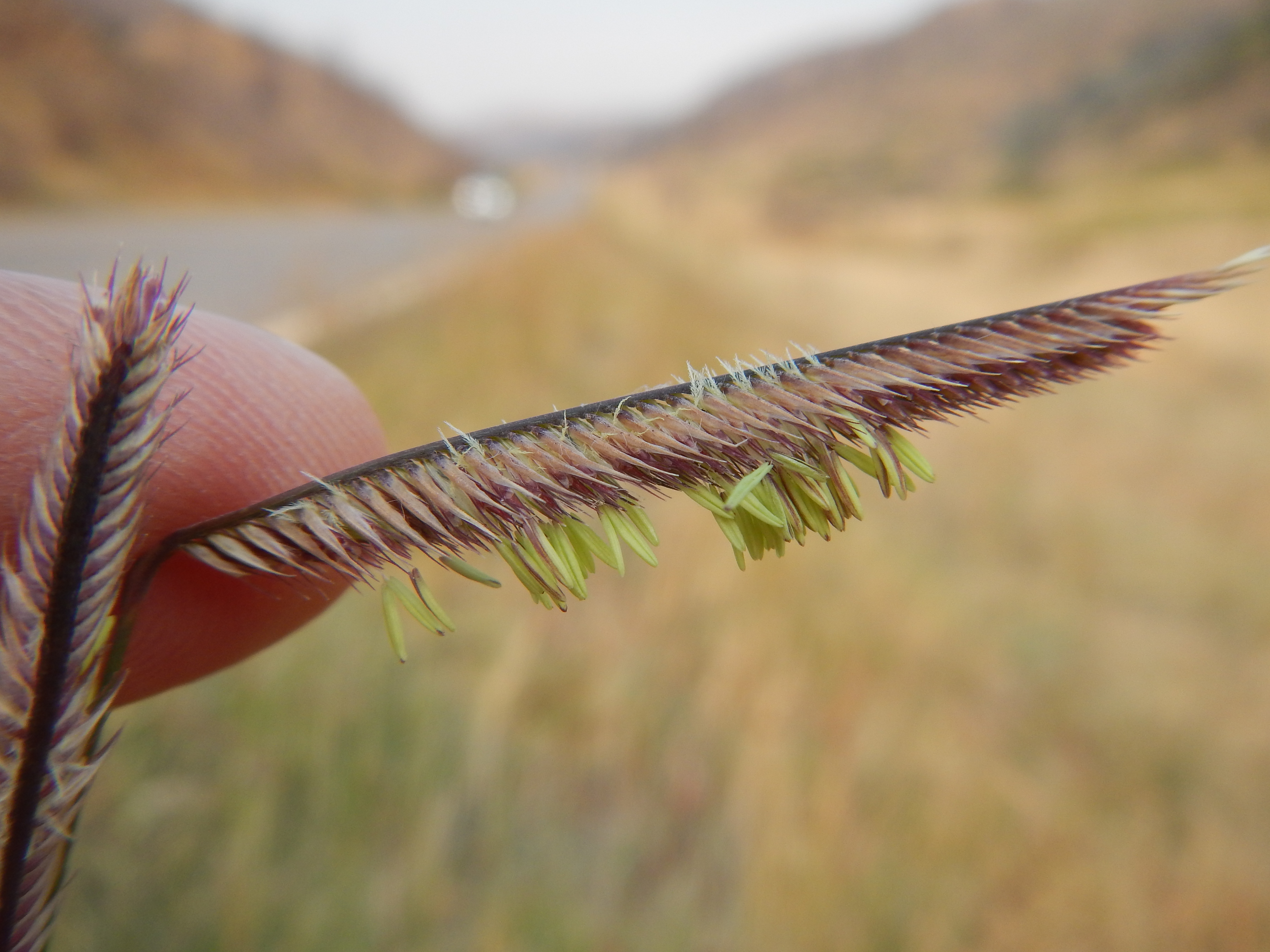
The comb-like spike in bloom in August, with white stigmas sticking out of the top and yellow anthers hanging below

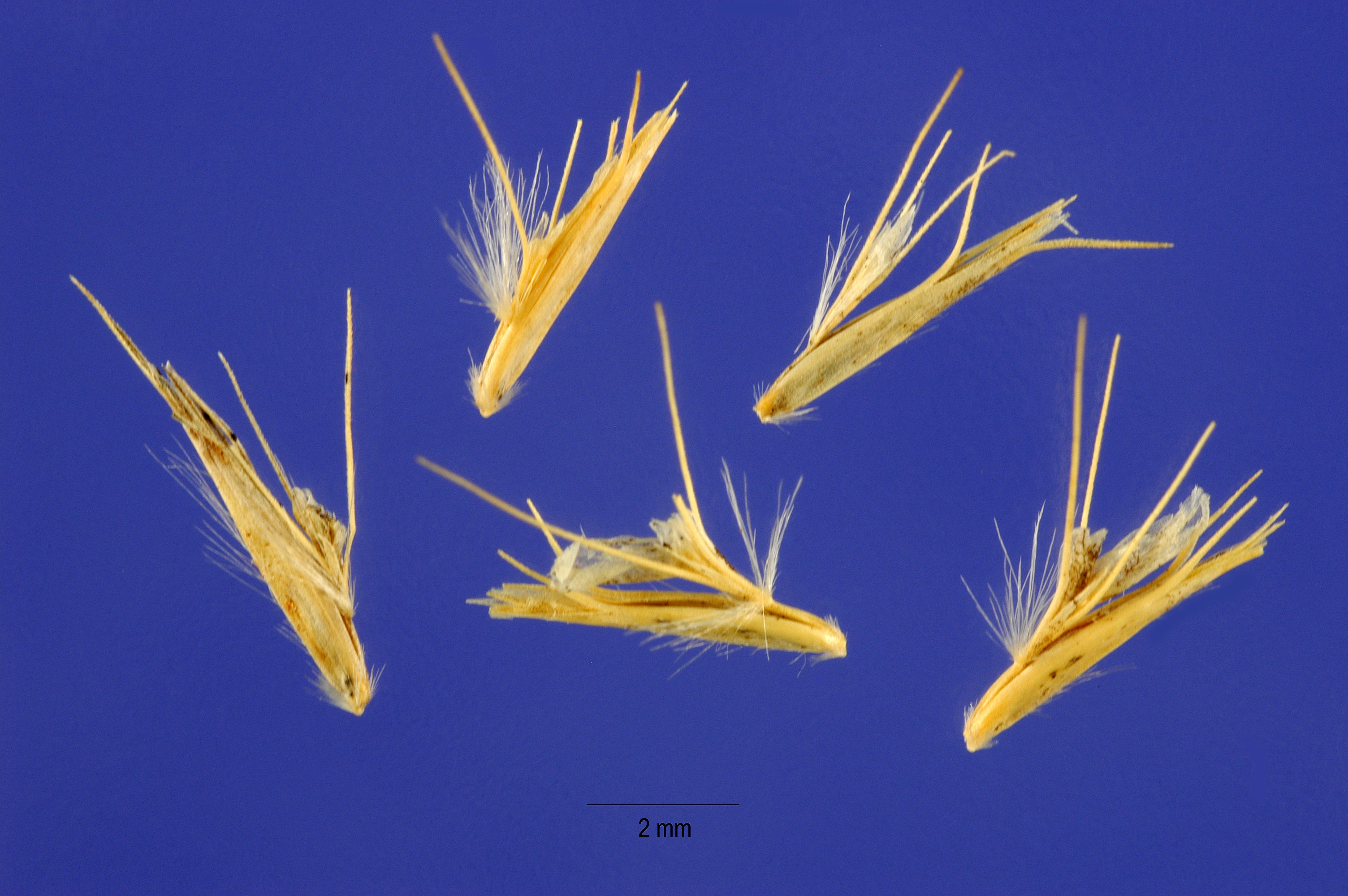
Mature spikelets that have detached from the spike. Each may contain a seed.

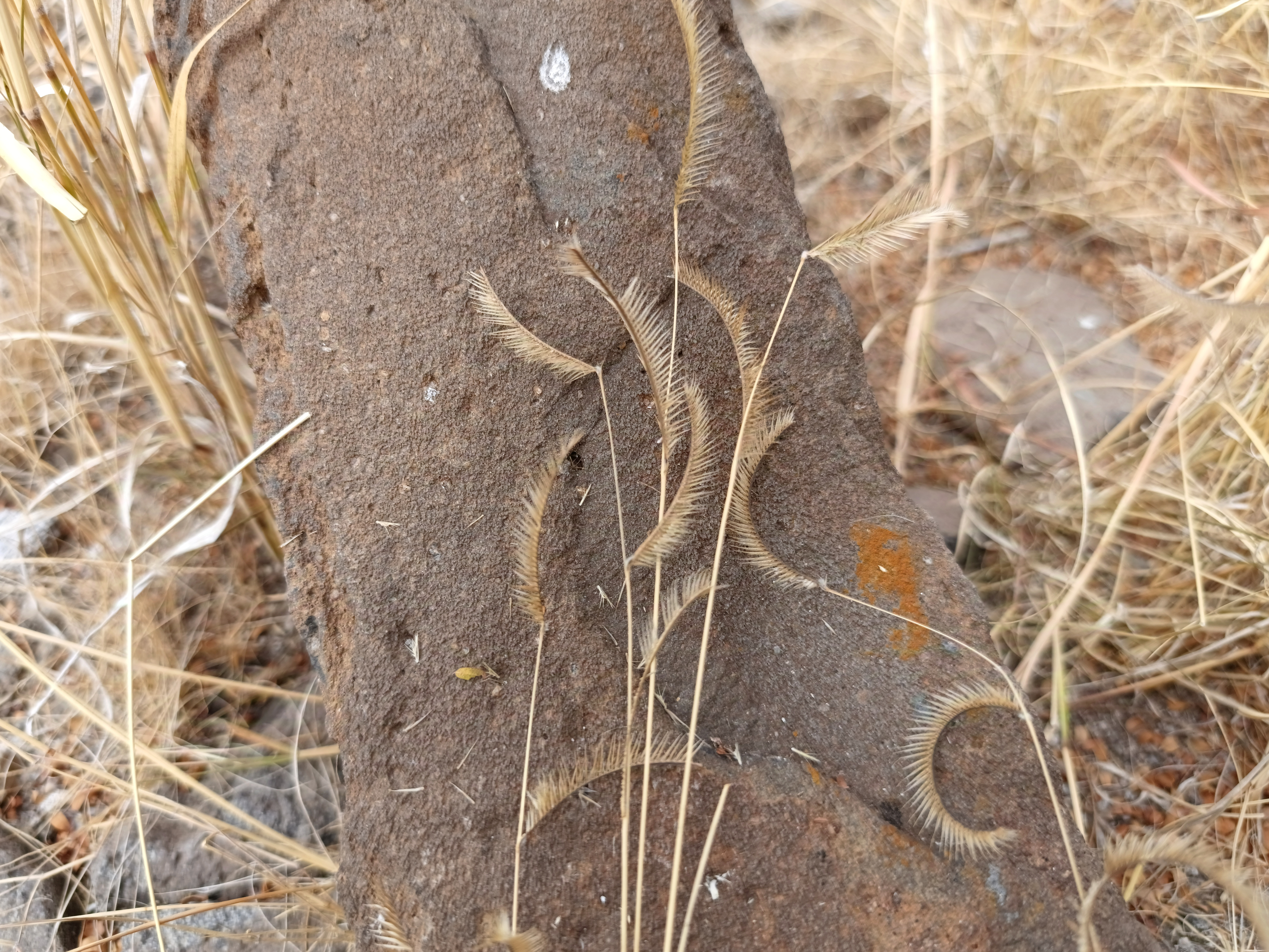
Blue grama grass in dry season

Blue grama has green to greyish leaves less than 3 mm (0.1 in) wide and 1 to 10 in (25 to 250 mm) long. The overall height of the plant is 6 to 12 in (15 to 30 cm) at maturity.

The flowering stems (culms) are 7 to 18 in (18 to 46 cm) long. At the top are one to four, usually two, comb-like spikes, which extend out at a sharp angle from the flowering stem. Each spike has 20 to 90 spikelets. Each spikelet is 5 to 6 mm (0.20 to 0.24 in) long, and has one fertile floret and one or two reduced sterile ones. Below the florets are two glumes, one 1.5 to 3 mm (0.06 to 0.12 in) long and the other 3.5 to 6 mm (0.14 to 0.24 in) long. The fertile floret has a lemma (bract) 5 to 5.5 mm (0.20 to 0.22 in) long, with three short awns (bristles) at the tip, and the sterile floret has a lemma about 2 mm (0.08 in) long with three awns about 5 mm (0.2 in) long. If pollinated, the fertile floret produces an oblong-elliptic brown seed 2.5 to 3 mm (0.10 to 0.12 in) long. When the seed is mature, the whole spikelet detaches, but the two glumes remain.

The roots generally grow 12 to 18 in (30 to 46 cm) outwards, and 3 to 6.5 ft (0.9 to 2.0 m) deep.

Blue grama is readily established from seed, but depends more on vegetative reproduction via tillers. Seed production is slow, and depends on soil moisture and temperature. Seeds dispersed by wind only reach a few meters (6 ft); further distances are reached with insects, birds, and mammals as dispersal agents. Seedling establishment, survival, and growth are greatest when isolated from neighboring adult plants, which effectively exploit water in the seedling's root zone. Successful establishment requires a modest amount of soil moisture during the extension and development of adventitious roots.

Established plants are grazing-, cold-, and drought-tolerant, though prolonged drought leads to a reduction in root number and extent. They employ an opportunistic water-use strategy, rapidly using water when available, and becoming dormant during less-favorable conditions. In terms of successional status, blue grama is a late seral to climax species. Recovery following disturbance is slow and depends on the type and extent of the disturbance.

== Distribution ==
Blue grama has the widest distribution of all grama grasses. It will grow on most soil types, and readily adapts to local conditions. It can be found as far north as Alberta, and as far south as Mexico. It is present in most of the Midwestern United States, extending east to Missouri and Texas, and as far west as Southern California. It has been introduced to some eastern states, as well as South America.

== Horticulture and agriculture ==
Blue grama is valued as forage, and is the most valuable grama. It is an ideal range grass in the southwest. It will survive heavy grazing and extreme drought, and is quite palatable to livestock. Grazing of blue grama rangelands might also prevent invasion of undesirable weedy plants.

Blue grama is grown by the horticulture industry, and used in perennial gardens, naturalistic and native plant landscaping, habitat restoration projects, and residential, civic, and highway erosion control. Blue grama flowers are also used in dried flower arrangements. Blue grama is the state grass of Colorado and New Mexico. It is listed as an endangered species in Illinois.

Blue grama has a large genome relative to other grama grasses. It can be diploid or tetraploid.

Among the Zuni people, the grass bunches are tied together and the severed end is used as a hairbrush, the other as a broom. Bunches are also used to strain goat's milk. The Costanoan, or Ohlone, use(d) the hollow stems as straws. The Navajo use(d) it as sheep and horse feed.

== Ecology ==
Blue grama is the dominant species of the US shortgrass steppe ecoregion. Populations of blue grama across the great plains are genetically differentiated (even at small spatial scales) and show functional trait variance connected to climate. Blue grama from more arid grasslands are also characterized by greater phenotypic plasticity.

It is a larval host to the Garita skipperling, green skipper, Pahaska skipper, Rhesus skipper, Simius roadside skipper, and the Uncas skipper.
