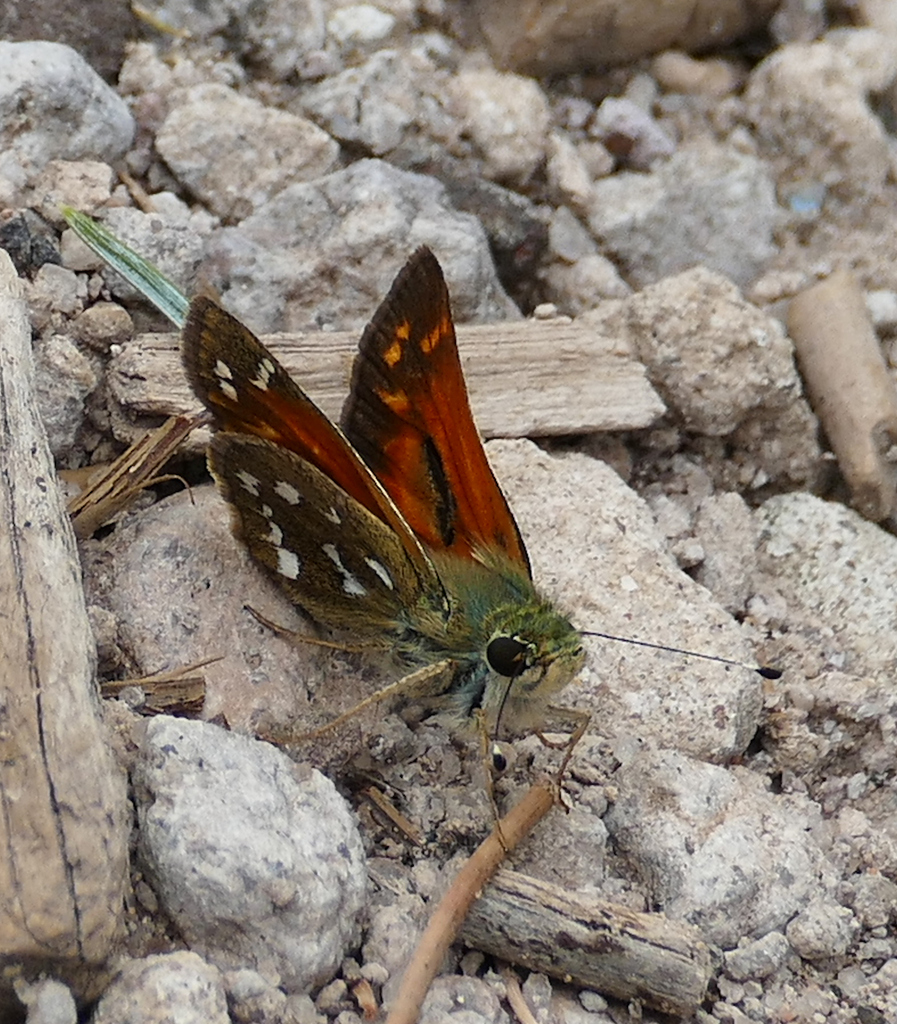

Conservation status
- Vulnerable (NatureServe)

Scientific classification
- Kingdom: Animalia
- Phylum: Arthropoda
- Clade: Pancrustacea
- Class: Insecta
- Order: Lepidoptera
- Family: Hesperiidae
- Genus: Hesperia
- Species: H. woodgatei

Binomial name
- Hesperia woodgatei (R. Williams, 1914)

= Hesperia woodgatei =

Species of butterfly

Hesperia woodgatei, the Apache skipper, is a species of grass skipper in the butterfly family Hesperiidae. It is found in North America.
