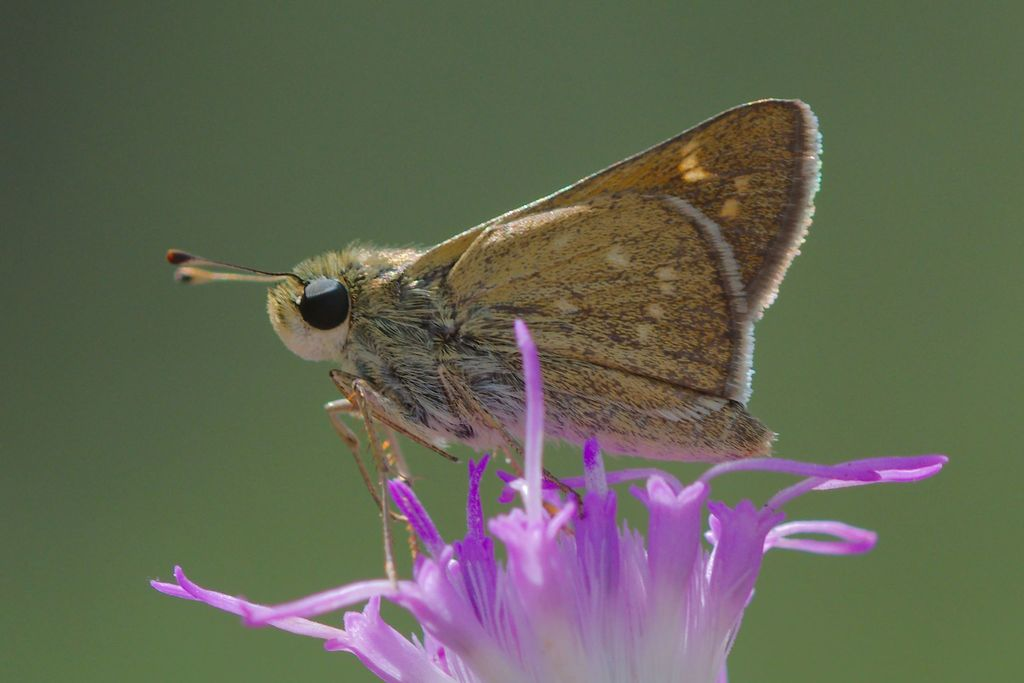

Conservation status
- Vulnerable (NatureServe)

Scientific classification
- Kingdom: Animalia
- Phylum: Arthropoda
- Class: Insecta
- Order: Lepidoptera
- Family: Hesperiidae
- Genus: Hesperia
- Species: H. attalus

Binomial name
- Hesperia attalus (W. H. Edwards, 1871)

= Hesperia attalus =

Species of butterfly

Hesperia attalus, the dotted skipper, is a butterfly in the family Hesperiidae (skippers). It was described by William Henry Edwards in 1871 and is found in North America.

== Subspecies ==
The following subspecies are recognised:

- Hesperia attalus attalus (W. H. Edwards, 1871)
- Hesperia attalus nigrescens Gatrelle, 1999 – dark dotted skipper
- Hesperia attalus slossonae (Skinner, 1871) – Slosson's dotted skipper
