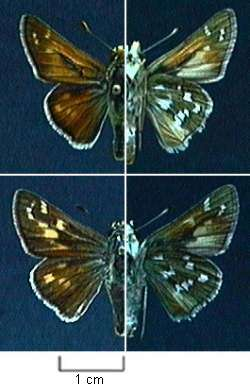

Conservation status
- Secure (NatureServe)

Scientific classification
- Kingdom: Animalia
- Phylum: Arthropoda
- Class: Insecta
- Order: Lepidoptera
- Family: Hesperiidae
- Genus: Hesperia
- Species: H. pahaska

Binomial name
- Hesperia pahaska Leussler, 1938

Subspecies
- 3 subsp., see text

Synonyms
- Erynnis comma colorado Dyar, 1903; Hesperia comma colorado

= Hesperia pahaska =

Species of butterfly

Hesperia pahaska, the Pahaska skipper, is a butterfly of the family Hesperiidae.

It is found from North America in a narrow belt of states extending from Texas to North Dakota, just reaching Canada in southern Saskatchewan and Manitoba.

The wingspan is 28–33 mm. The flight period is from June to early July in the northern U.S. Its habitats include desert grassland, chaparral, open woodland and prairie hills.

The larvae feed on blue grama (Bouteloua gracilis), fluff grass (Erioneuron pulchellum), Poaceae species, and Tridens pulchella.

== Subspecies ==
Listed alphabetically.

- Hesperia pahaska martini MacNeill, 1964
- Hesperia pahaska pahaska
- Hesperia pahaska williamsi Lindsey, 1940
