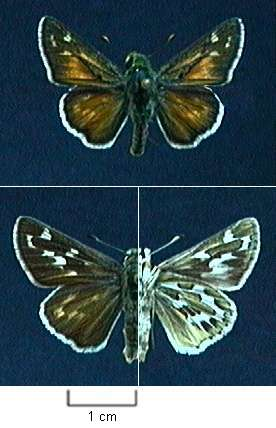

Conservation status
- Apparently Secure (NatureServe)

Scientific classification
- Kingdom: Animalia
- Phylum: Arthropoda
- Class: Insecta
- Order: Lepidoptera
- Family: Hesperiidae
- Genus: Hesperia
- Species: H. uncas

Binomial name
- Hesperia uncas W.H. Edwards, 1863

Subspecies
- 4 subspecies, see text

Synonyms
- Hesperia unkas Mabille, (misspelled); Hesperia uncus F. M. Brown, Eff & Rotger, 1956, (misspelled); Erynnis uncas Dyar, 1903

= Hesperia uncas =

Species of butterfly

Hesperia uncas, the Uncas skipper or white-vein skipper, is a butterfly of the family Hesperiidae. It is found from US Midwest to southern portions of the three Canadian Prairie provinces, north as far as Edmonton, Alberta.

The wingspan is 32–42 mm. There are two generations per year with adults on wing from May to June and again from August to September, in Canada from mid-June to late July. It is found in sandy areas, open woodlands, and sagebrush.

The larvae feed on Deschampsia elongata, Stipa, Bromus rubens, and Poa pratensis. Adults feed on flower nectar from various flowers, including rabbitbrush, needlegrass (Stipa nevadensis), and blue grama (Bouteloua gracilis).

== Subspecies ==
Listed alphabetically:

- Hesperia uncas fulvapalla Austin & McGuire, 1998
- Hesperia uncas gilberti MacNeill, 1964
- Hesperia uncas giuliani Austin & McGuire, 1998
- Hesperia uncas grandiosa Austin & McGuire, 1998
- Hesperia uncas lasus (Edwards, 1884)
- Hesperia uncas macswaini MacNeill, 1964
- Hesperia uncas reeseorum Austin & McGuire, 1998
- Hesperia uncas terraclivosa Austin & McGuire, 1998
- Hesperia uncas uncas Edwards, 1863
