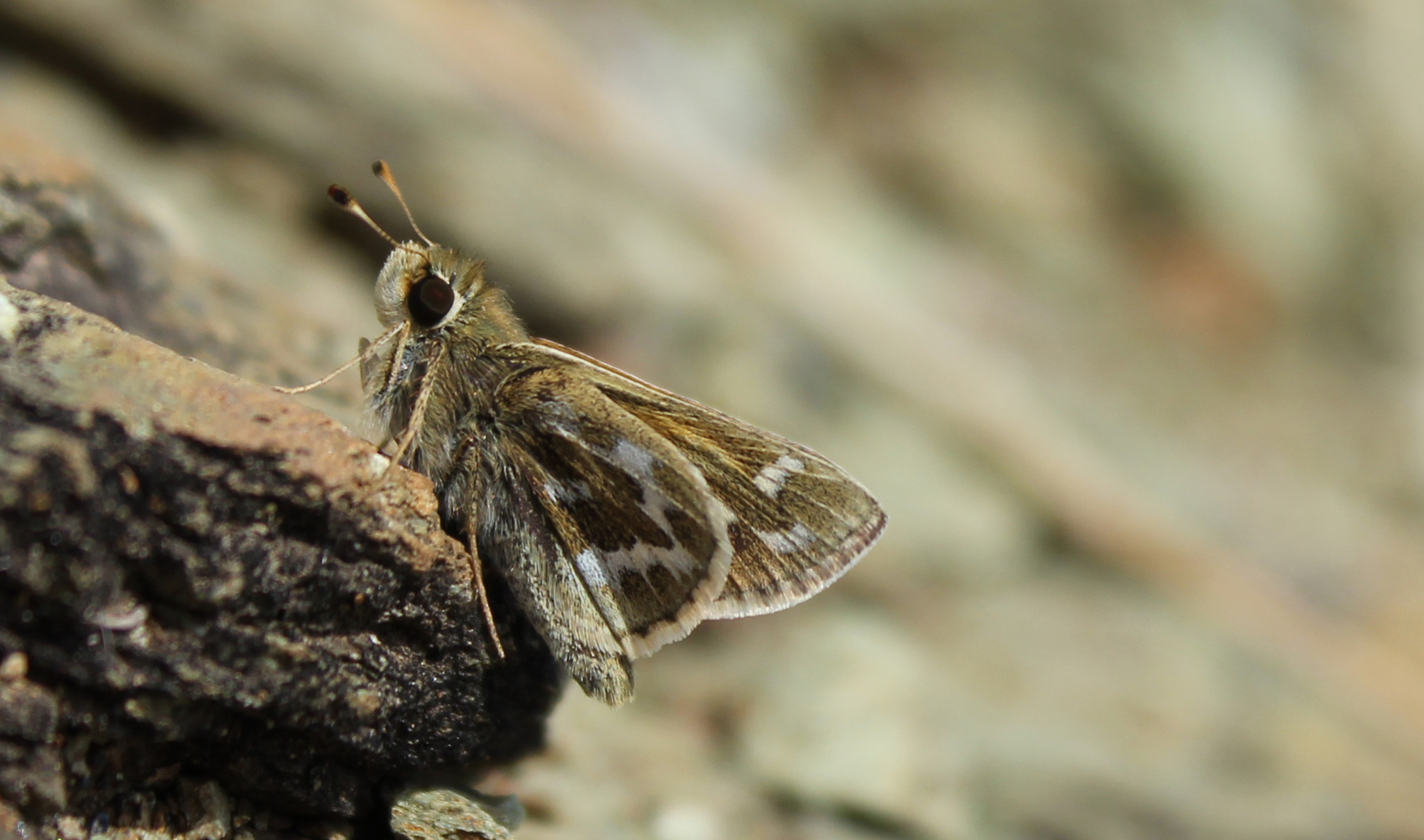

Conservation status
- Apparently Secure (NatureServe)

Scientific classification
- Kingdom: Animalia
- Phylum: Arthropoda
- Class: Insecta
- Order: Lepidoptera
- Family: Hesperiidae
- Genus: Hesperia
- Species: H. metea

Binomial name
- Hesperia metea Scudder, 1863

Synonyms
- Erynnis metea; Hesperia horus Edwards, 1871; Erynnis licinus; Lerema horus

= Hesperia metea =

Species of butterfly

Hesperia metea, the cobweb skipper, is a butterfly of the family Hesperiidae. It has a scattered distribution in the United States from southern Maine west to Wisconsin, south to central Georgia, the Gulf States and central Texas.

The wingspan is 29–35 mm. There is one generation with adults on wing from late March to early June.

The larvae feed on various grasses, including Schizachyrium scoparium and Andropogon gerardi. Adults feed on flower nectar from various low-growing plants, including Labrador tea, wild strawberry, blackberry, bird's-foot violet, winter cress, red clover, lilac, vervain, Carolina larkspur and wild hyacinth.

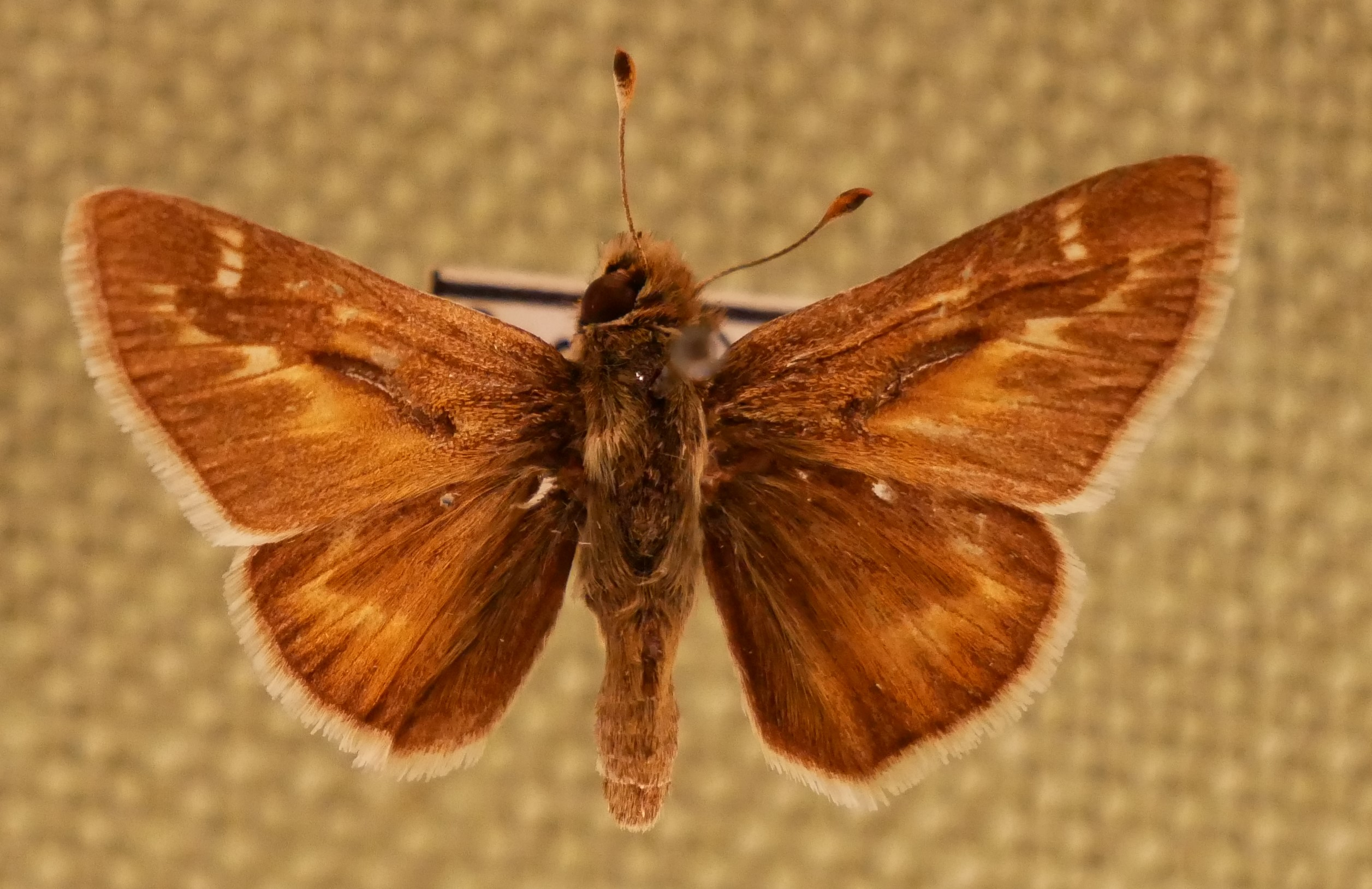
Hesperia metea museum specimen

== Subspecies ==
- Hesperia metea metea (Scudder, 1864)
- Hesperia metea intermedia (Gatrelle) - southern cobweb skipper
- Hesperia metea licinus (Edwards, 1871) - Licinus cobweb skipper
