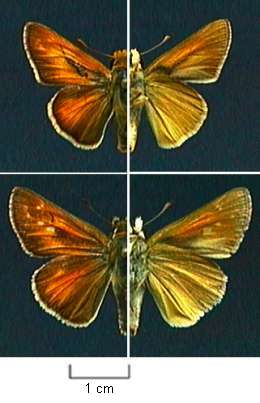

Conservation status
- Endangered (IUCN 3.1)

Scientific classification
- Kingdom: Animalia
- Phylum: Arthropoda
- Clade: Pancrustacea
- Class: Insecta
- Order: Lepidoptera
- Family: Hesperiidae
- Genus: Hesperia
- Species: H. ottoe

Binomial name
- Hesperia ottoe Edwards, 1866

= Hesperia ottoe =

Ottoe skipper

Species of butterfly

Hesperia ottoe, the Ottoe skipper, is a butterfly of the family Hesperiidae. It is found in the central U.S. but has been recorded in Canada only in a small area of southern Manitoba. It has been assessed as an endangered species. The Ottoe Skipper is native to mixed-grass prairies. The wingspan is 29–35 mm (1.1–1.4 in). The flight period is from mid-June to early August.

== Diet ==
The larvae feed on Poaceae species, Leptoloma cognatum, little bluestem (Andropogon scoparius), and, in Minnesota, on the flowers of purple coneflower (Echinacea angustifolia). Another main larval food for the Ottoe Skipper is Big Bluestem (Andropogon geradi). Eggs are oviposited by females and can be produced 200 at a time. After hatching, the larvae will crawl in the direction of their hostplant and they build leaf-tied nests at the base of their plant as they are feeding. There is one generation per year and they are not classified as migrants. Adults can feed on a variety of plants including Burgamot (Monarda fistulosa) and Milk Thistle (Carduus nutans). The Ottoe Skipper is unable to survive in altered habitats such as developed or agricultural land.

== Development ==
Hesperia ottoe can be an egg for 12–13 days. Instars 1-3 take place from 27 to 58 days. Instars 4th and 5th can be 14 to 36 days. Larvae will overwinter within grass litter as a 5th instar for six months. The 6th and 7th instars can be 25–38 days long before pupation occurs from 12–19 days.

== Reproduction ==
Males will rest and wait for females often on flowers. This is called “perching.” There are also “searching” behaviors males sometimes exhibit when trying to mate. When the female descends on a plant mating immediately occurs. This species has a polygynous mating system in which a female usually only mates once while males mate as much as possible. Their mating season starts once adults emerge in late June to mid-July. Females can produce 180 to 250 eggs per mating season. Females provide provisions for their eggs and oviposit them on suitable host plants that larvae will be able to feed on once they hatch.

== Predation ==
Common predators include crab spiders, ambush bugs, robber flies, birds, wasps, and ants.

== Conservation ==
The Ottoe skipper is negatively impacted by habitat destruction and loss due to human impact. Their primary habitats are not protected and are at risk of development, agricultural use, and aggregate mining. Grazing in grasslands can also degrade the environment to the point of it not being able to sustain Ottoe skipper populations. Light grazing can create an optimal environment, but without proper management can cause issues. Fire management of prairies is a method that risks the extirpation of small populations in an area.
