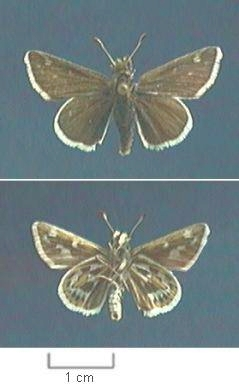

Conservation status
- Vulnerable (NatureServe)

Scientific classification
- Kingdom: Animalia
- Phylum: Arthropoda
- Class: Insecta
- Order: Lepidoptera
- Family: Hesperiidae
- Genus: Polites
- Species: P. rhesus

Binomial name
- Polites rhesus (W.H. Edwards, 1876)

Synonyms
- Pamphila rhesus Edwards, 1878; Hesperia axius Plötz, 1883; Chaerephon rhesus Godman & Salvin, [1900]; Erynnis rhesus Dyar, 1903, Bull. U.S. natn. Mus., 52: 50; Yvretta rhesus

= Polites rhesus =

Species of butterfly

Polites rhesus, the Rhesus skipper or plains gray skipper, is a butterfly in the family Hesperiidae. It is found in North America from Texas to North Dakota, as far north, but infrequently, as Saskatchewan and Alberta.

The wingspan is 25–30 mm.

There is one generation in May and June. Its habitats include short-grass and mixed grass prairie.

The larvae feed on grasses, including blue grama (Bouteloua gracilis). Adults feed on nectar from flowers including Drummond's milkvetch (Astragalus drummondii).
