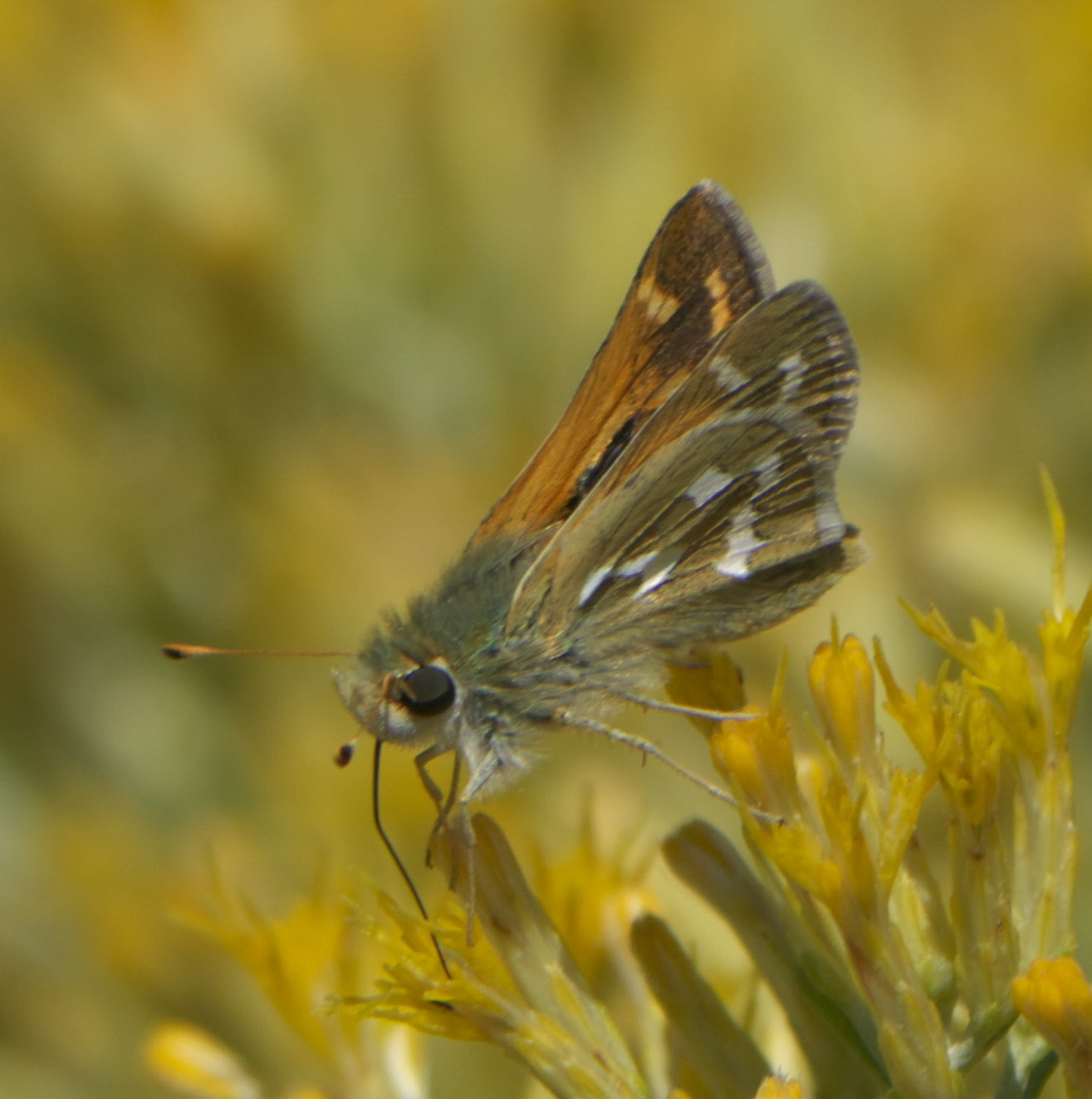

Scientific classification
- Kingdom: Animalia
- Phylum: Arthropoda
- Class: Insecta
- Order: Lepidoptera
- Family: Hesperiidae
- Genus: Hesperia
- Species: H. colorado

Binomial name
- Hesperia colorado (Scudder, 1874)

Subspecies
- See text

Synonyms
- Erynnis comma colorado Dyar, 1903; Hesperia comma colorado

= Hesperia colorado =

American branded skipper

Species of butterfly

Hesperia colorado, the American branded skipper, is a butterfly of the family Hesperiidae.

It is found from in Eurasia and north-western Africa, coast to coast in North America in boreal and subalpine areas south as far as Colorado, hence the Latin name.

The wingspan is 22–30 mm. The flight period is from late June to mid-August in western North America and from late July to early September in eastern North America.

The larvae feed on species of Muhlenbergia, Stipa, Andropogon, and Lolium.

== Subspecies ==
Listed alphabetically:

- H. c. colorado (Scudder, 1874) – western branded skipper
- H. c. dodgei (Bell, 1927) – Dodge's branded skipper
- H. c. harpalus (Edwards, 1881) – Idaho branded skipper, Yosemite branded skipper
- H. c. idaho (Edwards, 1883)
- H. c. leussleri Lindsey, 1940 – Leussler's branded skipper
- H. c. mattoonorum McGuire, 1998
- H. c. mojavensis Austin & McGuire, 1998 – Mojave branded skipper
- H. c. ochracea Lindsey, 1941 – ochre branded skipper
- H. c. oregonia (Edwards, 1883) – Oregon branded skipper
- H. c. oroplata Scott, 1981
- H. c. susanae Miller, 1962 – Susan's branded skipper
- H. c. tildeni Freeman, 1956 – Tilden's branded skipper
