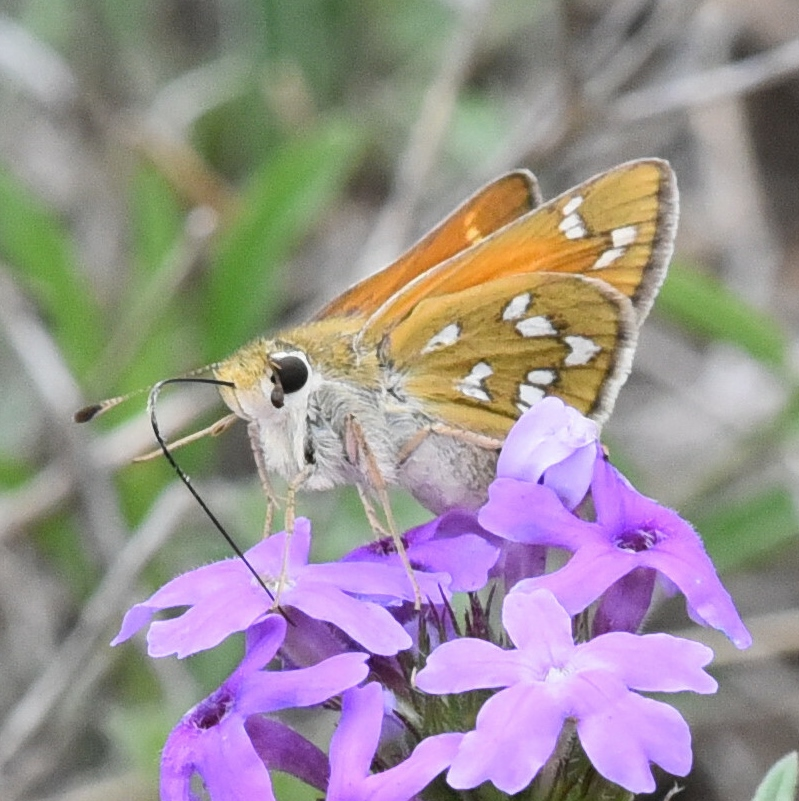

Conservation status
- Secure (NatureServe)

Scientific classification
- Kingdom: Animalia
- Phylum: Arthropoda
- Class: Insecta
- Order: Lepidoptera
- Family: Hesperiidae
- Genus: Hesperia
- Species: H. viridis

Binomial name
- Hesperia viridis (W. H. Edwards, 1883)

= Hesperia viridis =

Species of butterfly

Hesperia viridis, the green skipper, is a species of grass skipper in the butterfly family Hesperiidae. It is found in North America.

The MONA or Hodges number for Hesperia viridis is 4028.
