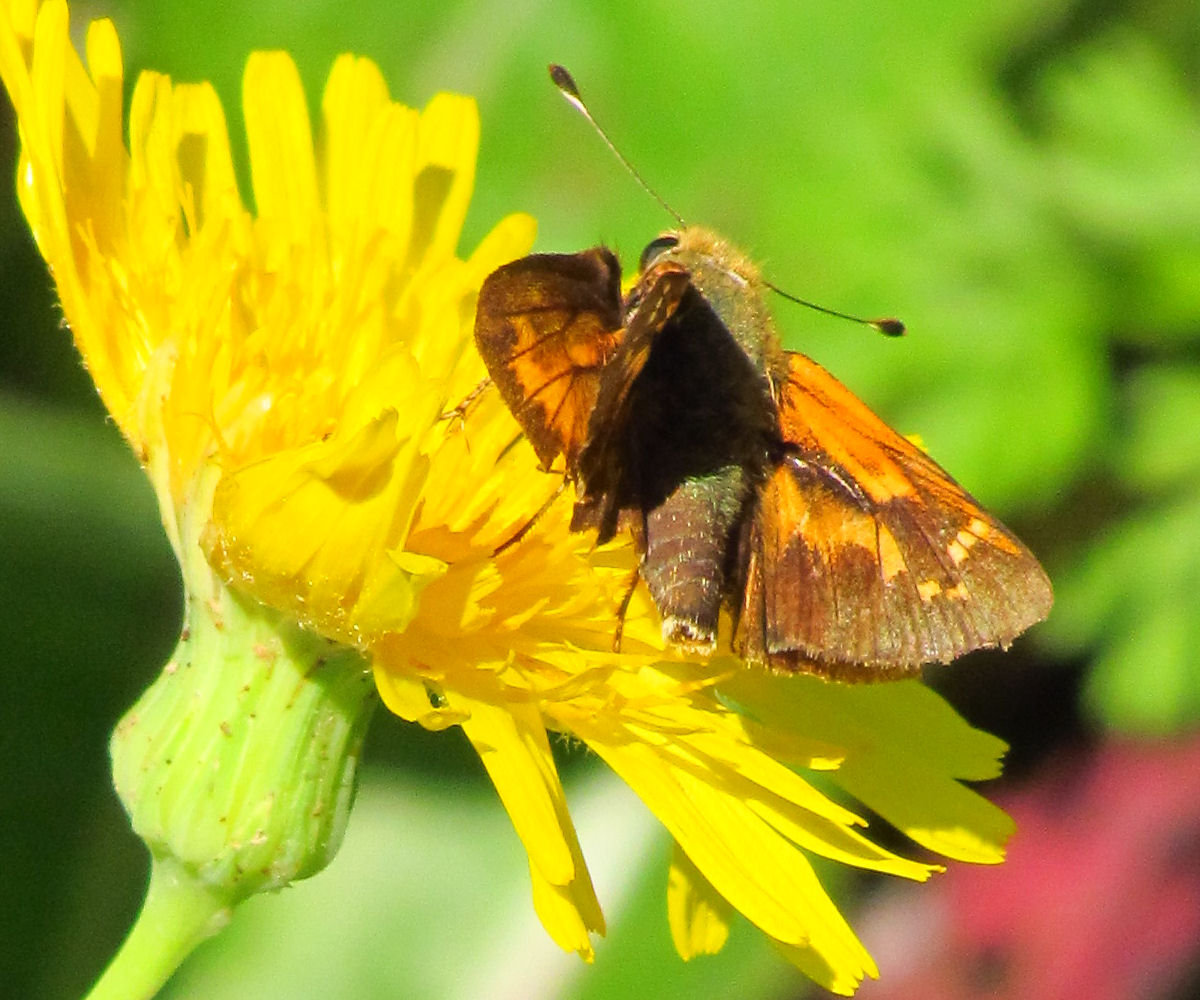
- On Canada hawkweed

Conservation status
- Secure (NatureServe)

Scientific classification
- Kingdom: Animalia
- Phylum: Arthropoda
- Class: Insecta
- Order: Lepidoptera
- Family: Hesperiidae
- Genus: Hesperia
- Species: H. sassacus

Binomial name
- Hesperia sassacus Harris, 1862

= Hesperia sassacus =

Indian skipper

Species of butterfly

Hesperia sassacus, the Indian skipper, is a butterfly of the family Hesperiidae.

== Taxonomy ==
The following subspecies are recognised:

- Hesperia sassacus sassacus Harris, 1862
- Hesperia sassacus manitoboides (Fletcher, 1889)
- Hesperia sassacus nantahala Gatrelle & Grkovich, 2003

== Description ==
The wingspan is 25–30 mm. The flight period is late May to early July.

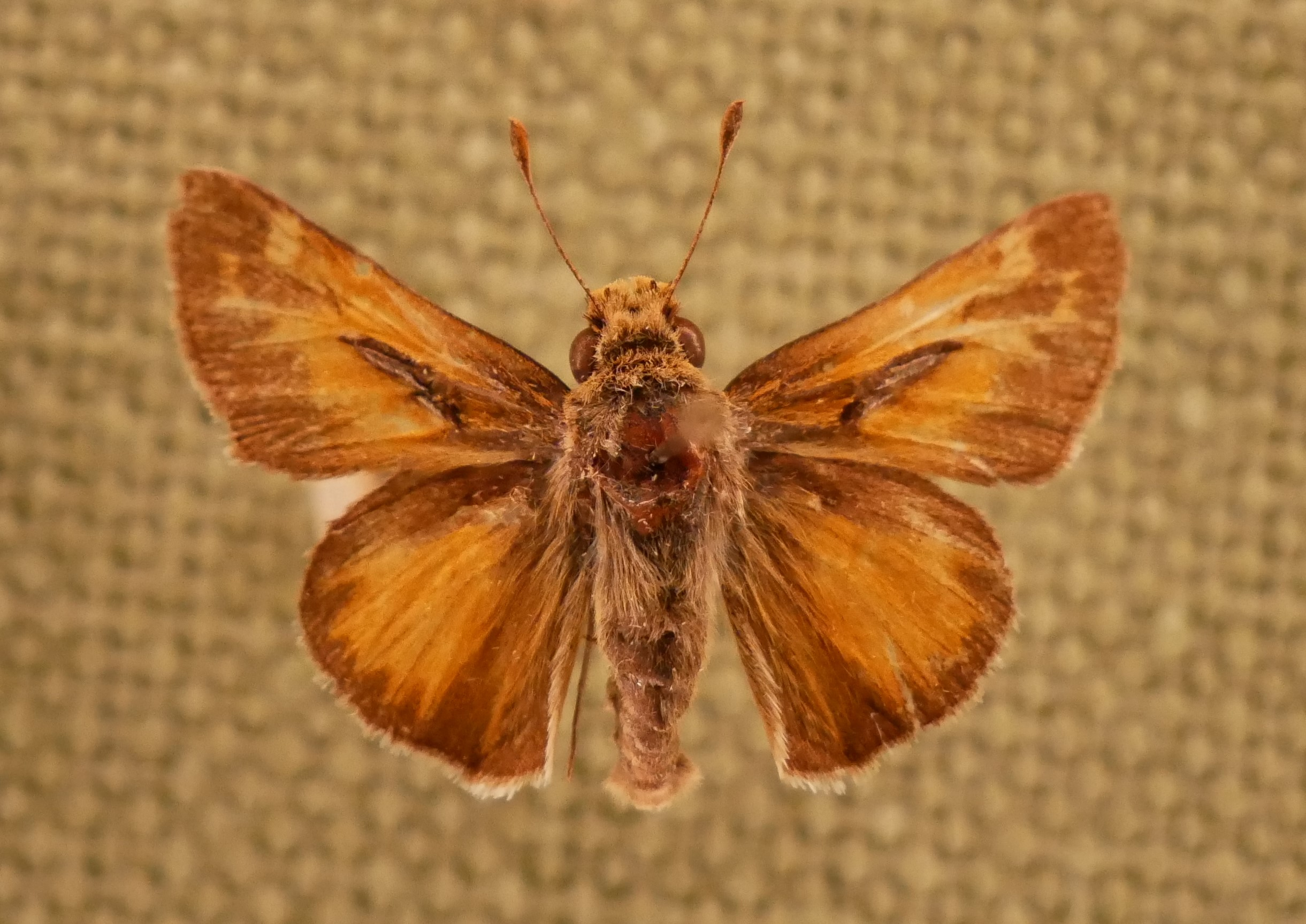
Museum specimen

== Distribution and habitat ==
It is found from northeastern U.S., and in Canada in southwestern New Brunswick and in a broad band from the Eastern Townships of Quebec through to southern Manitoba.

== Ecology and behaviour ==
The larvae feed on nodding fescue (Festuca obtusa), poverty grass (Danthonia spicata), and panic grass (Panicum), Bouteloua, Andropogon, Aristida, and Poaceae species.
