= List of Lepidoptera of Utah =

This is a list of Lepidoptera (butterflies and moths) observed in the U.S. state of Utah.

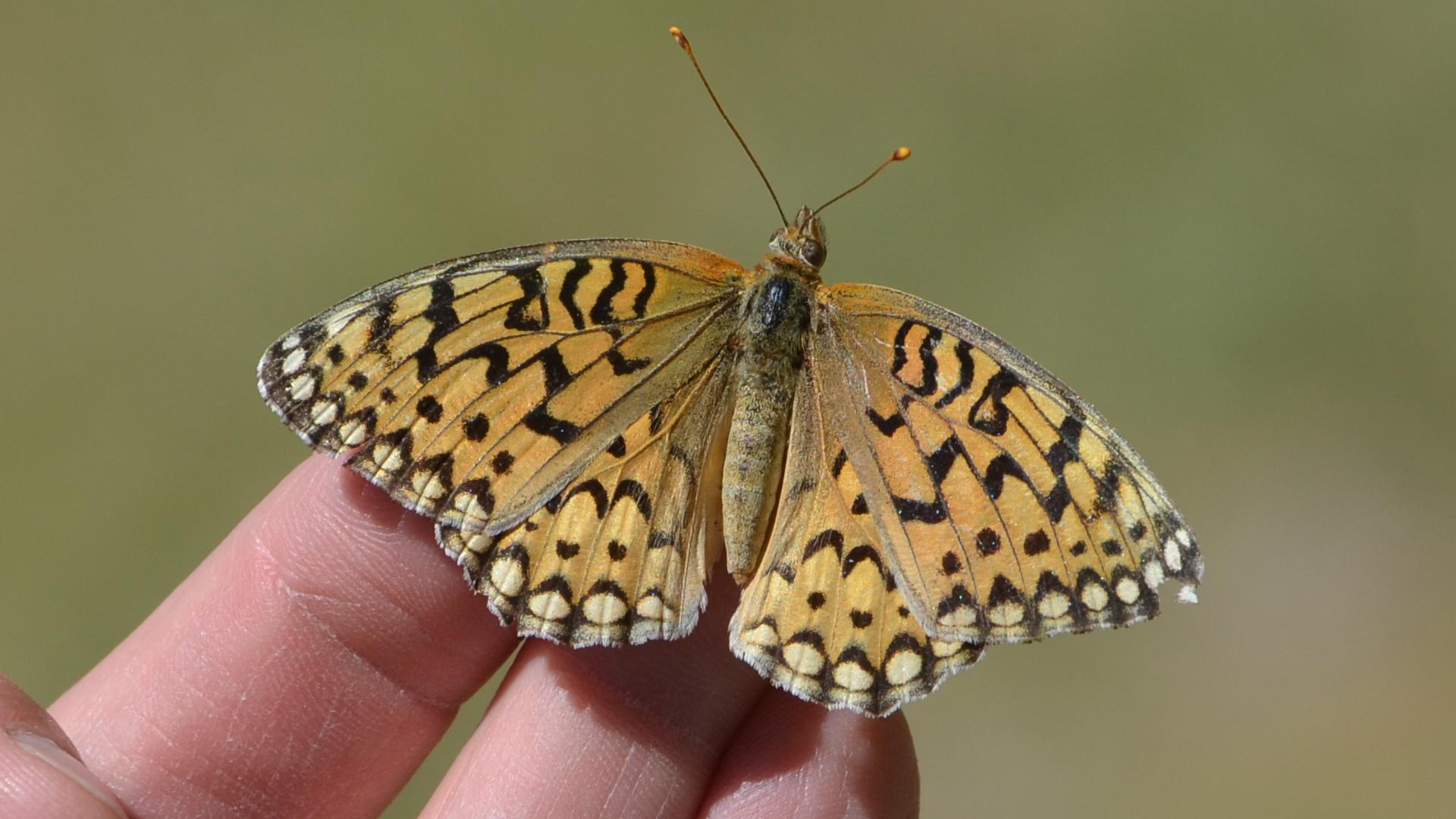
Callippe fritillary butterfly

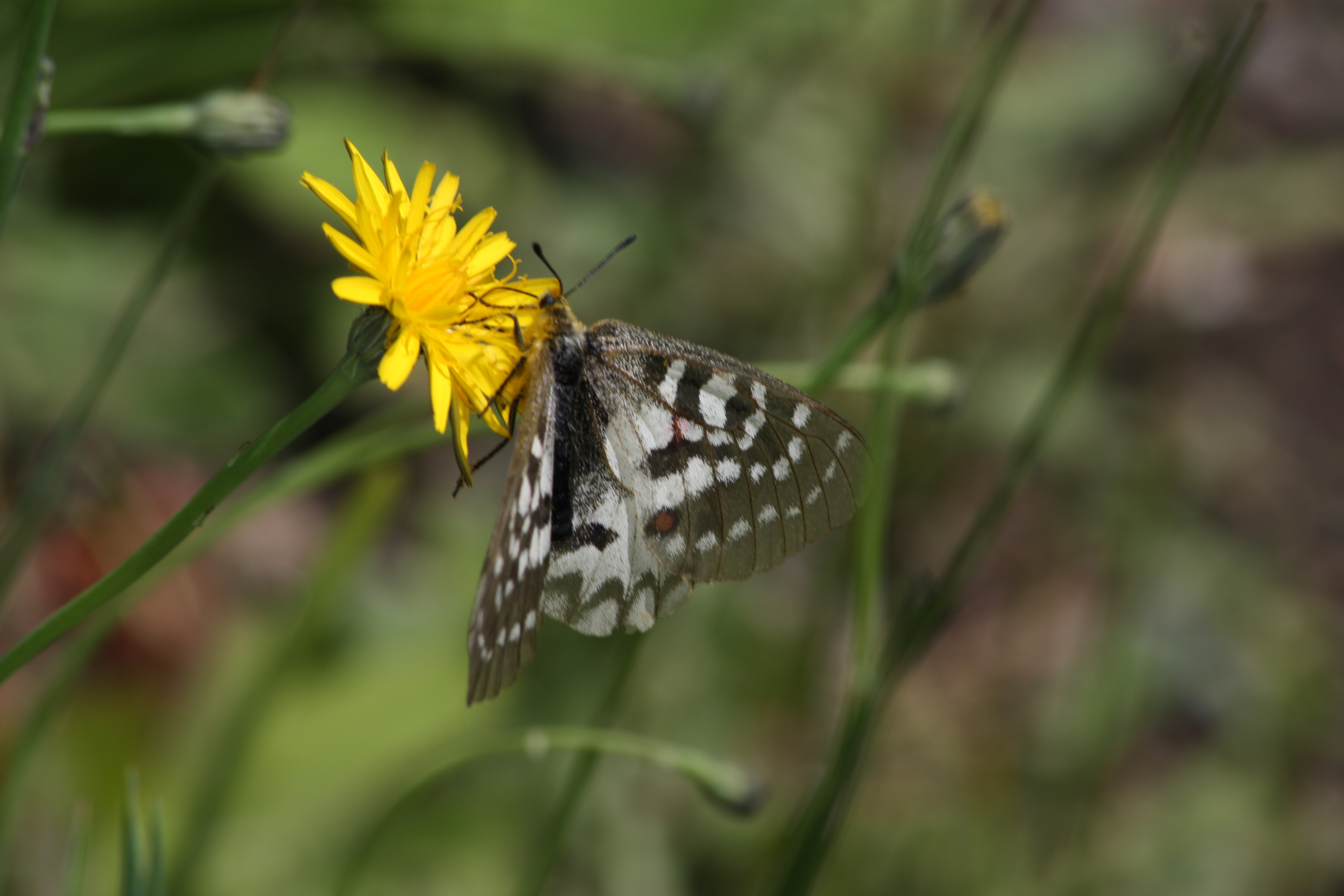
Clodius parnassian butterfly

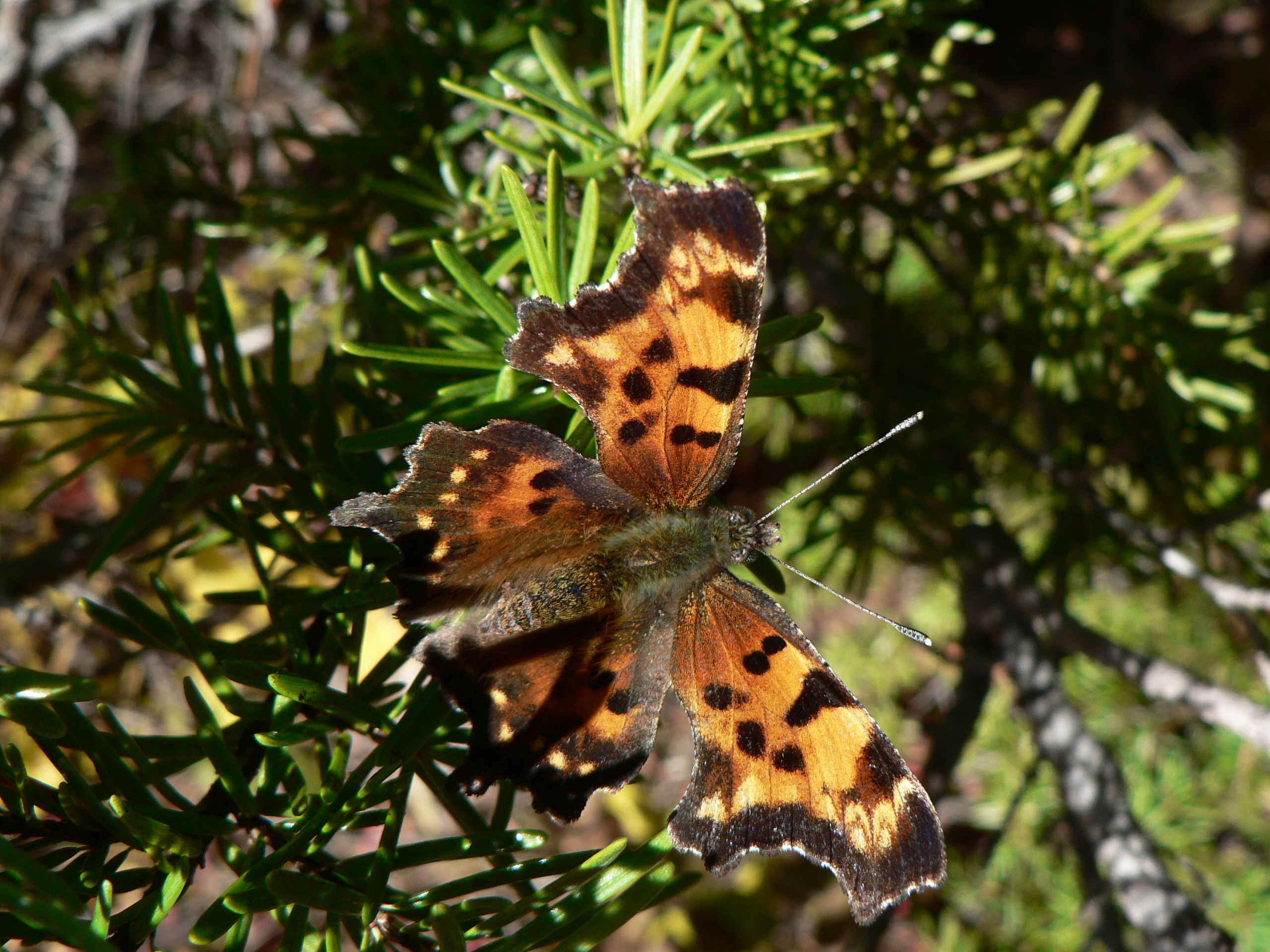
Green comma butterfly

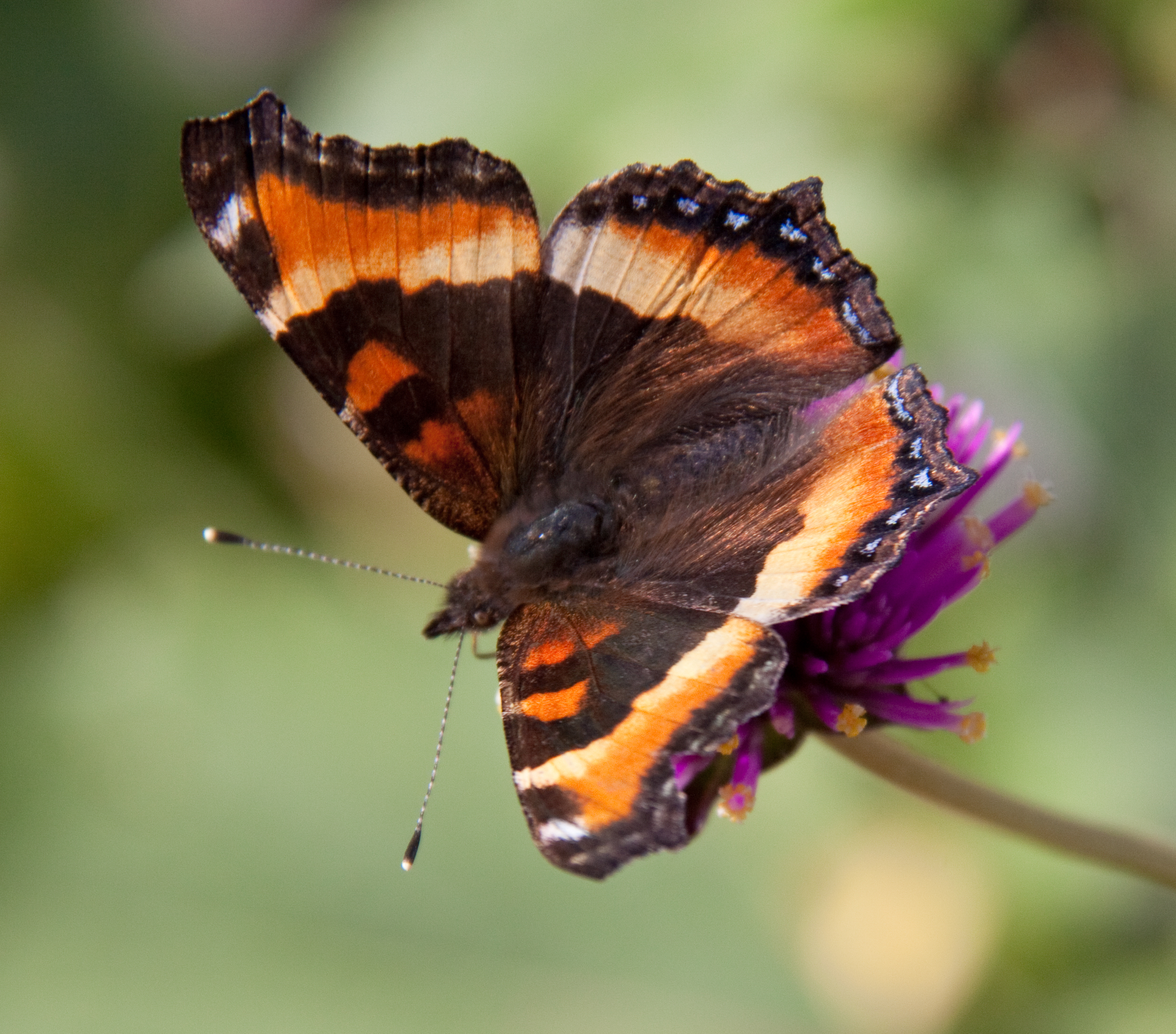
Milbert's tortoiseshell butterfly

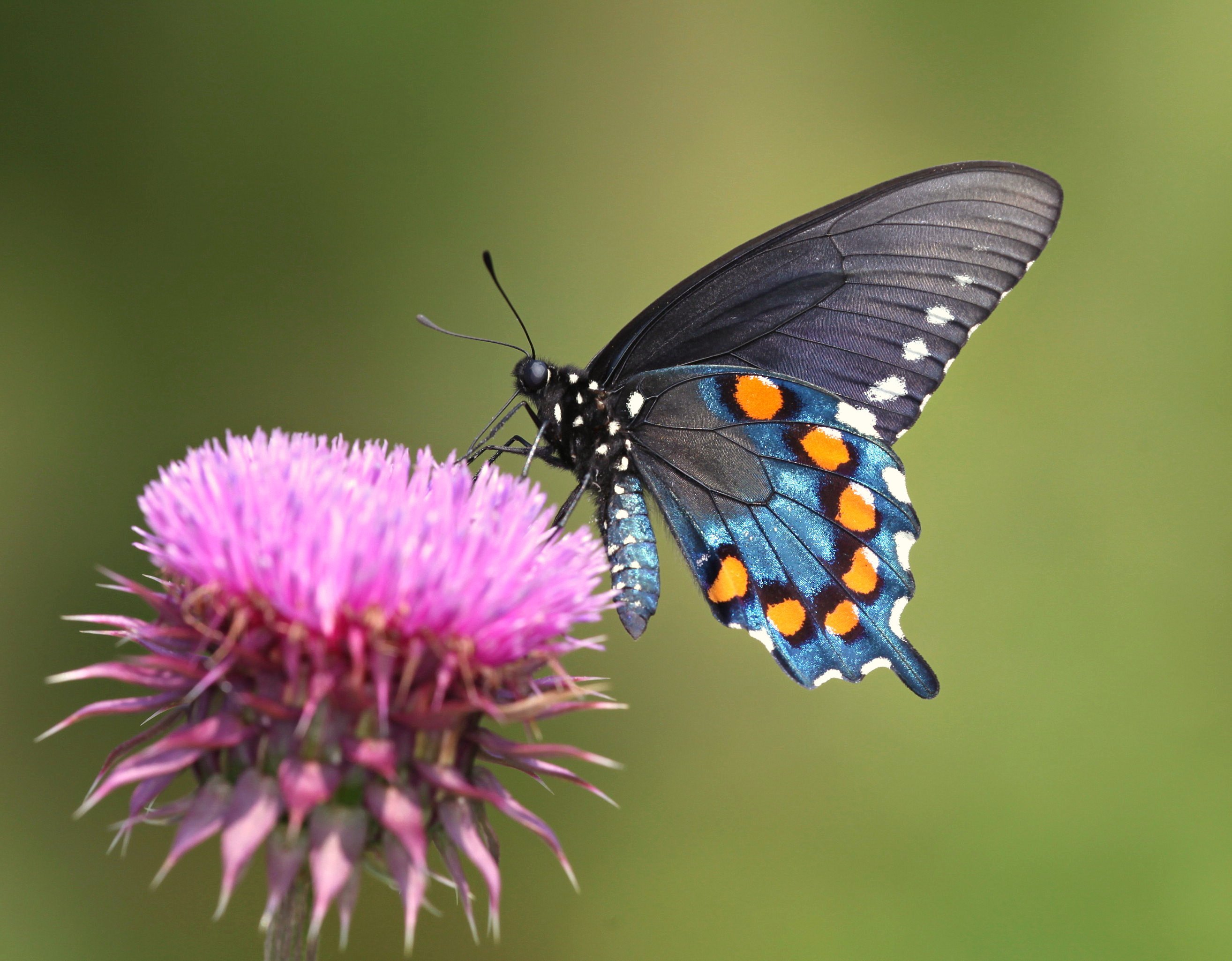
Pipevine swallowtail

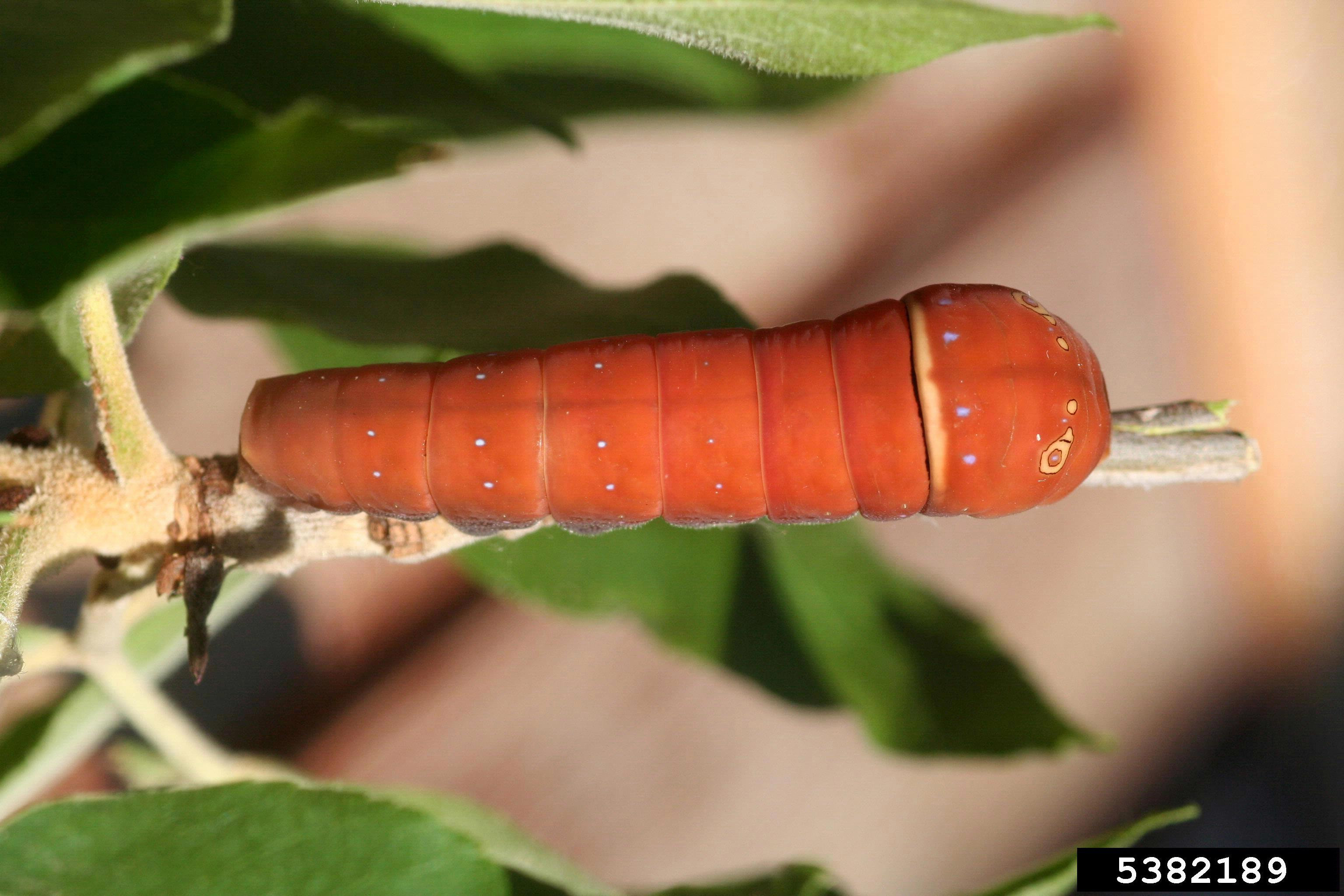
Caterpillar of two-tailed swallowtail

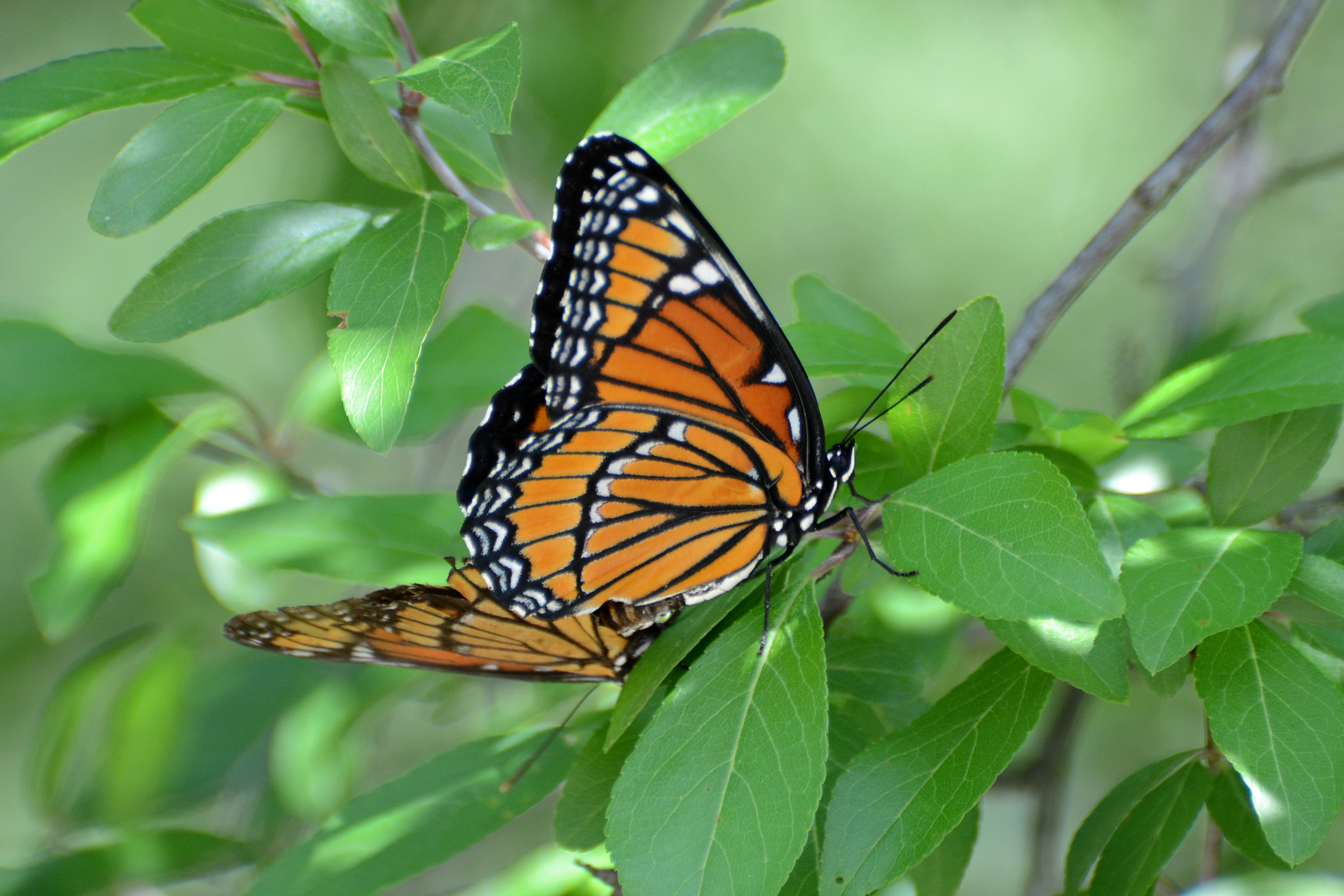
Viceroy butterfly mating pair

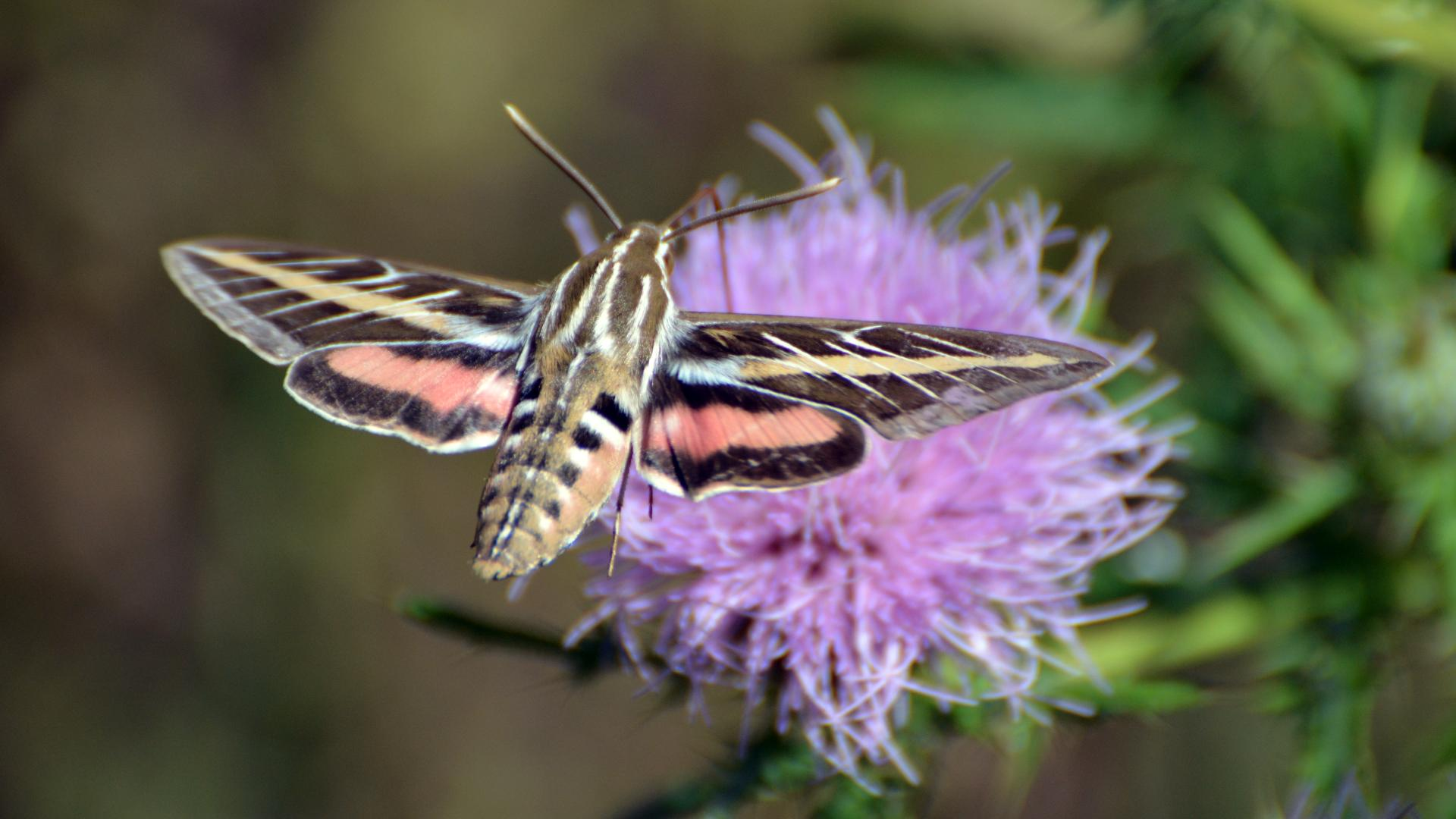
White-lined sphinx moth

- Achemon sphinx moth (Eumorpha achemon)
- American painted lady butterfly (Vanessa virginiensis)
- American snout butterfly (Libytheana carinenta)
- Anise swallowtail butterfly (Papilio zelicaon)
- Aphrodite fritillary butterfly (Speyeria aphrodite)
- Arctic fritillary butterfly (Boloria chariclea)
- Army cutworm (Euxoa auxiliaris)
- Black cutworm (Agrotis ipsilon)
- Black swallowtail butterfly (Papilio polyxenes)
- Bordered patch butterfly (Chlosyne lacinia)
- Cabbage looper (Trichoplusia ni)
- California patch butterfly (Chlosyne californica)
- California sister butterfly (Adelpha californica)
- California tortoiseshell butterfly (Nymphalis californica)
- Callippe fritillary butterfly (Speyeria callippe)
- Clodius parnassian butterfly (Parnassius clodius)
- Common buckeye butterfly (Junonia coenia)
- Compton tortoiseshell butterfly (Nymphalis vaualbum)
- Corn earworm (Helicoverpa zea) - also called the tomato fruitworm
- Coronis fritillary butterfly (Speyeria coronis)
- Diamondback moth (Plutella xylostella)
- Dotted checkerspot butterfly (Poladryas minuta)
- Edith's checkerspot butterfly (Euphydryas editha)
- Edward's fritillary butterfly (Speyeria edwardsii)
- Empress Leilia butterfly (Asterocampa leilia)
- Fall armyworm (Spodoptera frugiperda)
- Field crescent butterfly (Phyciodes pulchella)
- Five-spotted hawkmoth (Manduca quinquemaculata)
- Freija fritillary butterfly (Boloria freija)
- Fulvia checkerspot butterfly (Thessalia fulvia)
- Glassy cutworm (Crymodes devastator)
- Gorgone checkerspot butterfly (Chlosyne gorgone)
- Gray comma butterfly (Polygonia progne)
- Great Basin fritillary butterfly (Speyeria egleis)
- Great spangled fritillary butterfly (Speyeria cybele)
- Green comma butterfly (Polygonia faunus)
- Gulf fritillary butterfly (Agraulis vanillae)
- Hackberry emperor butterfly (Asterocampa celtis)
- Hoary comma butterfly (Polygonia gracilis)
- Hydaspe fritillary butterfly (Speyeria hydaspe)
- Indra swallowtail butterfly (Papilio indra)
- Leanira checkerspot butterfly (Chlosyne leanira)
- Lorquin's admiral butterfly (Limenitis lorquini)
- Milbert's tortoiseshell butterfly (Aglais milberti)
- Monarch butterfly (Danaus plexippus)
- Mormon fritillary butterfly (Speyeria mormonia)
- Mourning cloak butterfly (Nymphalis antiopa)
- Mylitta crescent butterfly (Phyciodes mylitta)
- Nokomis fritillary butterfly (Speyeria nokomis)
- Northern checkerspot butterfly (Chlosyne palla)
- Northern crescent butterfly (Phyciodes cocyta)
- Northwestern fritillary butterfly (Speyeria hesperis)
- Old World swallowtail butterfly (Papilio machaon)
- Painted lady butterfly (Vanessa cardui)
- Pale crescent butterfly (Phyciodes pallida)
- Pale swallowtail butterfly (Papilio eurymedon)
- Pale Western cutworm (Agrotis orthogonia)
- Pallid crescentspot butterfly (Phyciodes picta)
- Pearl crescent butterfly (Phyciodes tharos)
- Pipevine swallowtail butterfly (Battus philenor)
- Queen butterfly (Danaus gilippus)
- Red admiral butterfly (Vanessa atalanta)
- Red-spotted purple butterfly (Limenitis arthemis astyanax)
- Relict fritillary butterfly (Boloria kriemhild)
- Rockslide checkerspot butterfly (Chlosyne whitneyi)
- Rocky Mountain parnassian butterfly (Parnassius smintheus)
- Silver-bordered fritillary butterfly (Boloria selene)
- Small white butterfly (Pieris rapae)
- Soldier butterfly (Danaus eresimus)
- Tropical buckeye butterfly (Junonia genoveva)
- Two-tailed swallowtail butterfly (Papilio multicaudata)
- Variable checkerspot butterfly (Euphydryas chalcedona)
- Variegated cutworm (Peridroma saucia)
- Variegated fritillary butterfly (Euptoieta claudia)
- Viceroy butterfly (Limenitis archippus)
- Weidemeyer's admiral butterfly (Limenitis weidemeyerii)
- West Coast lady butterfly (Vanessa annabella)
- Western bean cutworm (Striacosta albicosta)
- Western tiger swallowtail butterfly (Papilio rutulus)
- White admiral butterfly (Limenitis arthemis)
- White peacock butterfly (Anartia jatrophae)
- White-lined sphinx moth (Hyles lineata)
- Zerene fritillary butterfly (Speyeria zerene)
