= Phyciodes pulchella =

Field crescent
- P. p. owimba Yoho National Park, BC, Canada

Scientific classification
- Kingdom: Animalia
- Phylum: Arthropoda
- Clade: Pancrustacea
- Class: Insecta
- Order: Lepidoptera
- Family: Nymphalidae
- Genus: Phyciodes
- Species: P. pulchella

Binomial name
- Phyciodes pulchella (Boisduval, 1852)

Synonyms
- Melitaea pratensis Behr, 1863; Melitaea campestris Behr, 1863; Phyciodes campestris Gunder, 1928; Eresia campestris Reakirt, 1866; Phyciodes pratensis Röber, 1913

Species of butterfly

Phyciodes pulchella, the field crescent, is a butterfly of the family Nymphalidae. It is found in the Nearctic realm.

The wingspan is 24–36 mm. The butterfly flies from May to August in Canada.

The larvae feed on Asteraceae species.

== Subspecies ==
Listed alphabetically:

- P. p. camillus Edwards, 1871
- P. p. deltarufa Scott, 1998
- P. p. inornatus Austin, 1998
- P. p. montana (Behr, 1863)
- P. p. owimba Scott, 1998
- P. p. pulchella
- P. p. tutchone Scott, 1994
- P. p. shoshoni Scott, 1994
- P. p. vallis Austin, 1998
P. p. camillus, male

P. p. camillus, female

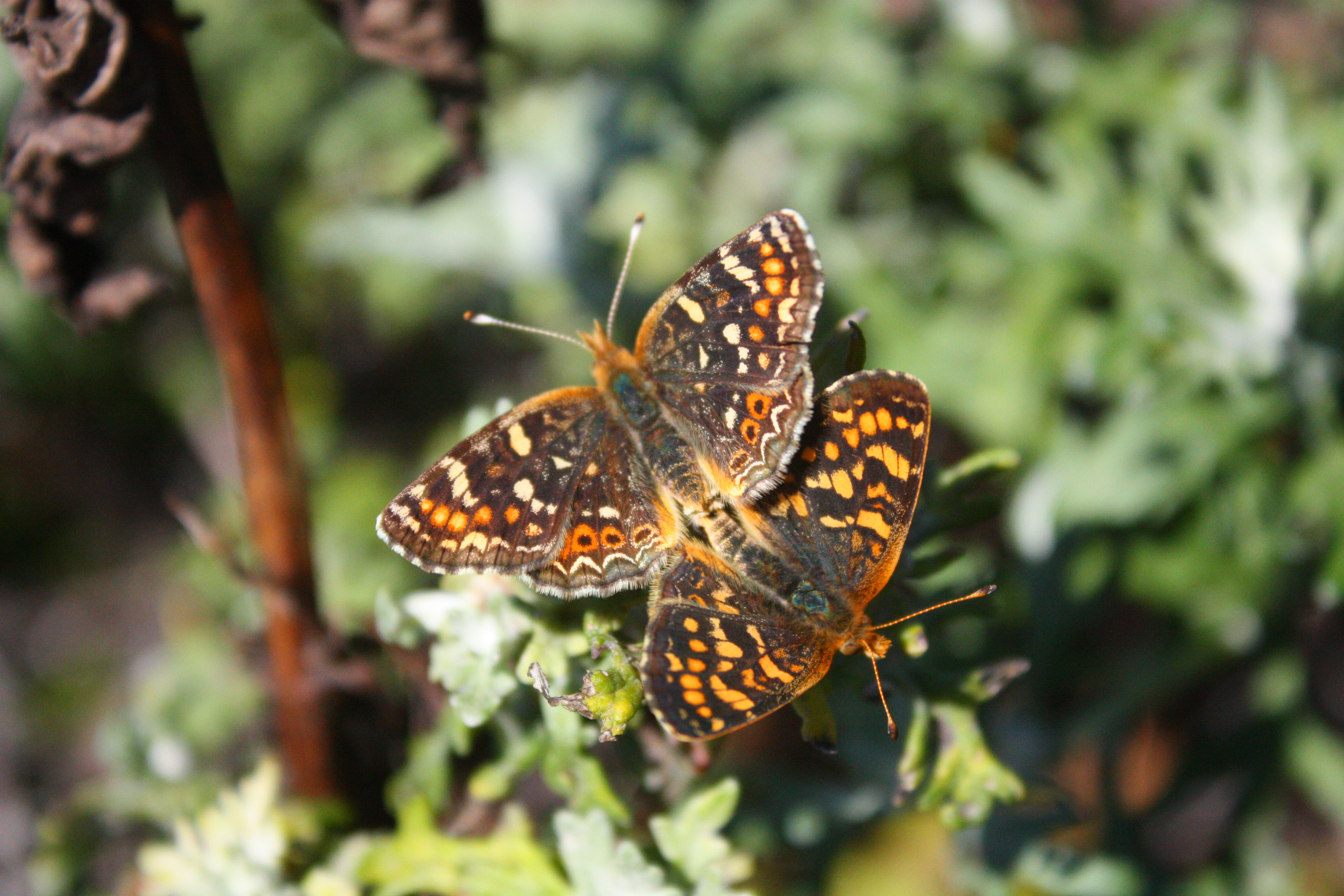
mating

== Similar species ==
- Phyciodes cocyta – northern crescent
- Phyciodes batesii – tawny crescent
- Phyciodes mylitta – Mylitta crescent
- Phyciodes pallida – pale crescent
- Phyciodes tharos – pearl crescent
