= Bear River Migratory Bird Refuge =

United States National Wildlife Refuge in Utah

- IUCN category IV (habitat/species management area)

- Location within Utah Location within the United States
- Location: Box Elder County, Utah, United States
- Nearest city: Brigham City, Utah
- Coordinates: 41°30′35″N 112°04′10″W
- Area: 99,413 acres (402.31 km^{2})
- Established: 1928
- Visitors: 224,369 (in 2026)
- Governing body: U.S. Fish and Wildlife Service
- Website: Bear River Migratory Bird Refuge

Bear River Migratory Bird Refuge is a National Wildlife Refuge in Utah, established in 1928. The Bear River Migratory Bird Refuge (BRMBR) is on the northeastern portion of the Great Salt Lake in Utah near the town of Brigham City. Located where the Bear River enters the Great Salt Lake, the refuge uses a system of dikes and canals to control the flow of water to maintain critical wetland habitat for thousands of migratory birds. Birds migrating along both the Central and Pacific Flyways depend on the refuge as a place to rest and refuel on long journeys. Currently, the refuge is 77,102 acres with an additional 22,311 acres acquired from the state of Utah in 2026 for a total of nearly 100,000 acres.

== Refuge Purpose ==
Bear River Migratory Bird Refuge was established to preserve "a suitable refuge and feeding and breeding grounds for migratory wild fowl".

The goals of the BRMBR are to “provide necessary habitats for the provision of food and cover needed to fulfill lifecycle events such as migration, staging, feeding, and breeding of migratory bird species using the Refuge, with an emphasis on focal species and native wildlife. The Refuge conserves and enhances the wetland and upland areas to accomplish these goals. To that end, management actions strive to maximize available habitat for multiple species of migratory birds, while providing for the highest quality of recreational experiences deemed compatible such as hunting, fishing, wildlife observation/photography, and environmental education and interpretation. Water, as the critical element in a wetland habitat, comes in short supply to the arid west and must be carefully managed.”

== History ==
=== Geologic History ===
As part of the Great Salt Lake, the BRMBR is a remnant of prehistoric Lake Bonneville. Lake Bonneville dates back to the Pleistocene epoch (about 70,000 years ago) and occupied 20,000 square miles. The Great Salt Lake averages about 1,700 square miles, with the refuge consisting of about 155 square miles.

The BRMBR is located in northern Utah between the Wasatch mountain range on the east and the Promontory mountains on the west. The wetlands are formed where the Bear River flows into the Great Salt Lake and are surrounded primarily by arid land. The marshes are the largest freshwater component of the Great Salt Lake ecosystem.

=== Early Human History ===
Archaeological evidence of human habitation appears in the areas surrounding the refuge almost as soon as Lake Bonneville receded. Paleolithic, Archaic, Great Salt Lake Fremont were among the earliest inhabitants of the area. The fluctuating nature of the lake dictated only migratory habitation by the early inhabitants due to flooding and drought.

Later, several Native groups including Shoshone, Paiute, Bannock, and Ute people used the area. They called themselves Newe or Neme (the People.) The Newe formed small extended-family groups and were semi-nomadic hunter-gathers. The wetlands of the Bear River area provided abundant plant and animal life for subsistence.

=== Exploration ===
John C. Frémont was one of the first explorers to leave a written record of the Bear River area. In his report of an expedition to the wetlands, he described the vast numbers of birds in the area. “The whole morass was animated with multitudes of water fowl, which appeared to be very wild–rising for the space of a mile round about at the sound of a gun, with a noise like distant thunder.”

=== Settlement ===
By the mid-1800’s many Europeans settled in the area. The communities and farms required water to subsist. Several canal, irrigation, and even power projects diverted great quantities of water from the Bear River severely restricting the residual amount of water to the wetlands. The marshes began to dry. By 1920, only two or three thousand acres of the original forty-five thousand acres of wetland were left. The reduction of these critical habitat areas became a serious problem affecting the survival of migrating birds.

=== Avian Botulism ===
Low water levels due to upstream overconsumption contributed to outbreaks of Avian botulism. Avian botulism is often fatal for birds and is caused when a bird ingests a toxin produced by a bacterial spore. The spores can remain dormant for years waiting until the right conditions emerge, warm and stagnant water. Between 1910 and 1920, over 3.5 million birds died in the BRMBR due to the disease. The devastating loss of so many birds contributed to the creation of the refuge. The disease continued to impact the area as recently as 2023 with the deaths of an estimated 30,000 ducks due to avian botulism.

=== Modern Timeline ===
1928: Bear River Migratory Bird Refuge was officially created by Congress. The Civilian Conservation Corps (CCC) built dikes and canals to keep fresh water from mixing with the saline water of the Great Salt Lake.

1936: The CCC constructed an administration building, hospital for treating sick and injured birds, a research laboratory, three lookout towers, vehicle and foot bridges, a power plant, and a filtration plant. In addition to creating these structures, the CCC camp also built and resurfaced 35 miles of roads, 30 miles of fencing around the BRMBR boundaries, wooden spillways and water control structures for habitat management, and nine nesting islands for migratory birds.

1943: An improvement to the modern airboat was invented to assist researchers at Bear River Migratory Bird Refuge. Cecil Williams, Leo Young, and G. Hortin Jensen added a 40 hp continental aircraft engine to a flat-bottomed aluminum boat. The boat was named the Alligator I and was the first to use an air rudder.

1983: Abnormally high amounts of precipitation several seasons in a row caused the Great Salt Lake to flood. Saline water from the lake breached the refuge dikes and contaminated the fresh water habitats. The visitor center that had only recently been completed was surrounded by water. All roads into the refuge flooded and the entire area was inaccessible.

1990: 7 years after flooding, the roads, canals, and dikes reemerged. Refuge employees, volunteers, and community members started the work of cleaning up and rebuilding the area.

1992: Terry Tempest Williams published her book Refuge: An Unnatural History of Family and Place about the flooding of the refuge.

1993: A grassland area was acquired and added to the acreage of the refuge. The area added critical breeding and nesting habitat.

1997: Over 1.5 million cubic yards of dirt was moved to restore and improve the old dikes.

2000: After a decade of sustained efforts, the Great Salt Lake ecosystem recovered and millions of birds began using the refuge again.

2003: The National Wildlife Refuge System celebrated 100 years of conservation. The Bear River Migratory Bird Refuge celebrated 75 years of conservation.

2006: The new James V. Hansen Wildlife Education Visitor Center opened to the public. The building was designed by CA Chamberlin Architects. The exhibits were designed by Dixon Studios.

2021: An updated Habitat Management Plan was approved with updated goals for the refuge including continued restoration and partnerships in conservation efforts.

2025: The impoundment dikes in Unit 2A were removed to allow water to sheet flow to the rest of Unit 2 in order to inhibit Phragmites growth and allow more native species to repopulate the area for migratory birds and wildlife.

2026: The refuge acquired and additional 22,311 acres of land from the state of Utah, bringing the total area of the refuge to nearly 100,000 acres.

2026: Andrew H. Hedges published A Reed Shaken with the Wind: A Human and Natural History of the Bear River Marsh which gave a comprehensive description of the BRMBR.

== Climate ==
The climate of the Bear River Migratory Bird Refuge is similar to that of the Great Salt Lake and surrounding areas. Brigham City is the closest city to the refuge and has hot, dry summers with cold, freezing winters. The area receives around 15 inches of precipitation per year.

The refuge is part of the Great Salt Lake Hydrologic Cycle, a complex water cycle with evaporation and precipitation each influenced by the other.

Climate data for Brigham City, Utah (Brigham City Waste Plant), 1991–2020 normals, extremes 1974–present
Month	Jan	Feb	Mar	Apr	May	Jun	Jul	Aug	Sep	Oct	Nov	Dec	Year
Record high °F (°C)	60 (16)	66 (19)	76 (24)	85 (29)	94 (34)	101 (38)	106 (41)	102 (39)	96 (36)	92 (33)	73 (23)	66 (19)	106 (41)
Mean maximum °F (°C)	48.0 (8.9)	54.9 (12.7)	68. (20)	76.9 (24.9)	85.1 (29.5)	93.2 (34.0)	98.2 (36.8)	96.1 (35.6)	90.4 (32.4)	79.4 (26.3)	64.0 (17.8)	52.1 (11.2)	98.6 (37.0)
Mean daily maximum °F (°C)	36.4 (2.4)	42.5 (5.8)	54.0 (12.2)	61.5 (16.4)	71.3 (21.8)	81.9 (27.7)	91.0 (32.8)	89.2 (31.8)	79.2 (26.2)	64.8 (18.2)	49.6 (9.8)	37.6 (3.1)	63.3 (17.3)
Daily mean °F (°C)	27.2 (−2.7)	32.4 (0.2)	42.3 (5.7)	48.8 (9.3)	57.5 (14.2)	66.2 (19.0)	74.3 (23.5)	72.4 (22.4)	62.8 (17.1)	50.3 (10.2)	38.3 (3.5)	28.7 (−1.8)	50.1 (10.0)
Mean daily minimum °F (°C)	18.1 (−7.7)	22.4 (−5.3)	30.7 (−0.7)	36.0 (2.2)	43.8 (6.6)	50.4 (10.2)	57.5 (14.2)	55.7 (13.2)	46.4 (8.0)	35.9 (2.2)	26.9 (−2.8)	19.8 (−6.8)	37.0 (2.8)
Mean minimum °F (°C)	1.1 (−17.2)	5.4 (−14.8)	17.4 (−8.1)	24.6 (−4.1)	30.2 (−1.0)	37.8 (3.2)	46.9 (8.3)	43.6 (6.4)	33.3 (0.7)	22.7 (−5.2)	12.3 (−10.9)	3.7 (−15.7)	−3.4 (−19.7)
Record low °F (°C)	−22 (−30)	−23 (−31)	3 (−16)	15 (−9)	23 (−5)	30 (−1)	35 (2)	34 (1)	15 (−9)	6 (−14)	−3 (−19)	−25 (−32)	−25 (−32)
Average precipitation inches (mm)	1.53 (39)	1.23 (31)	1.54 (39)	1.69 (43)	2.04 (52)	1.13 (29)	0.39 (9.9)	0.61 (15)	1.27 (32)	1.60 (41)	1.07 (27)	1.39 (35)	15.49 (392.9)
Average snowfall inches (cm)	12.2 (31)	7.5 (19)	4.2 (11)	1.2 (3.0)	0.0 (0.0)	0.0 (0.0)	0.0 (0.0)	0.0 (0.0)	0.0 (0.0)	0.5 (1.3)	4.1 (10)	8.6 (22)	38.3 (97.3)
Average precipitation days (≥ 0.01 in)	8.6	7.7	7.6	8.3	8.6	4.0	2.3	3.2	5.0	6.1	6.5	7.9	75.8
Average snowy days (≥ 0.1 in)	5.3	3.4	1.7	0.6	0.0	0.0	0.0	0.0	0.0	0.3	1.3	4.2	16.8
Source 1: NOAAall-time extreme temperature
Source 2: National Weather Service

== Ecology ==
The BRMBR provides a critical habitat for a variety of wildlife including birds, plants, mammals, insects, and invertebrates.

Red-winged Blackbird along the Bear River

=== Birds ===
Every year, an estimated 277 million birds migrate along the Pacific and Central Flyways of North America. Many travel vast distances of thousands of miles. The BRMBR is an important feeding and resting location along the migration route. The area contains abundant food for birds, including insects and brine shrimp, and plants like sago pondweed. Several species stay to breed, nest and raise their young in the wetlands, and other species live at the refuge year-round.

During migration, the GSL ecosystem provides habitat for an estimated 217 million waterfowl use-days in the fall and 60 million waterfowl use-days in spring. Refuge habitats alone may support up to 500,000 waterfowl and 200,000 shorebirds annually during migration.

More than 250 different species of birds visit the refuge and 67 of those stay to nest. Depending on the season, species often seen at the refuge include:

- American avocet
- American coot
- American goldfinch
- American kestrel
- American white pelican
- Bald eagle
- Black tern
- Black-billed magpie
- Black-necked stilt
- California gull
- Cinnamon teal
- Common raven
- Cormorant
- Egret
- Common starling
- Franklin's gull
- Great blue heron
- Killdeer
- Long-billed curlew
- Long-billed dowitcher
- Mallard
- Marbled godwit
- Marsh wren
- Northern harrier
- Red-winged blackbird
- Redhead
- Ruddy duck
- Rough-legged hawk
- Snowy plover
- Song sparrow
- Swallow
- Tundra swan
- Western kingbird
- White-faced ibis
- Wilson's phalarope
- Yellow-headed blackbird

=== Plants ===
Plants are important in providing both habitat and food at the refuge. There are many species of native and non-native plants. Native varieties include sago pondweed, hardstem bulrush, and saltgrass. Non-native plants include sweet clover, wild sunflowers, wheatgrass, asters, thistles, milkweed, and russian olive trees.

=== Other Wildlife ===
Although the refuge was created primarily as a sanctuary habitat for birds, many other species of wildlife depend on the area and are part of the ecosystem. The variety of wildlife includes Mule deer, long-tailed weasel, vole, skunk, muskrat, feral cats, butterflies, moths, midges, mosquitoes, and Western chorus frogs.

=== Invasive Species ===
Many invasive species have been unwittingly introduced into the BRMBR ecosystem including carp, American bullfrog, Phragmites, tamarisk, and dyer’s woad. Often these invasive species threaten existing habitat and conservation efforts are targeted at ridding the area of the invading intruder. For example, ‘to combat the undesirables, managers had sprayed the marsh with hundreds of thousands of gallons of herbicide…this was on top of over eight thousand pounds of rotenone they had used to kill carp.” At one point, even California gulls were considered invasive and extensive efforts to eradicate them included dousing thousands of eggs with diesel fuel. Efforts to contain the 18’ tall, aggressively growing phragmites include controlled burning of large areas of land, mowing, and even allowing cattle grazing. Despite ongoing efforts, the battle against invasive species continues with sometimes deleterious unintended consequences such as chemical contamination due to eradication efforts.

== Conservation ==
Conservation has always been a primary purpose of the refuge. Beginning in the 1920’s the community around the Bear River Bay recognized an important habitat was being lost as a direct consequence of human actions. Since that time the perception of the interconnectedness of human and ecological systems continues to grow. Much of that awareness results from education through conservational rhetoric. An exhibit in the James V. Hansen Wildlife Education Center quotes American ecologist Aldo Leopold, “When we see land as a community to which we belong, we may begin to use it with love and respect.” Conservation rhetoric such as this, used in the exhibits, helps visitors begin to understand the refuge as part of the greater community.

Image of the Wall of Birds exhibit at the James V. Hansen Wildlife Education Center

The BRMRB is part of the National Wildlife Refuge System. The primary mission of the NWRS is conservation, “It drives everything on United States Fish and Wildlife Service lands and waters, managed within the Refuge System, from the purposes for which a National Wildlife Refuge is established to the recreational activities offered to the resource management tools used. Using conservation best practices, the Refuge System manages Service lands and waters to help ensure the survival of native wildlife species.

Refuge staff use a variety of habitat management techniques to maintain, recover or enhance plant and wildlife values. Management techniques are carefully considered and employed in varying degrees according to needs.”

=== Conservation through the Arts ===
The BRMBR participates in the Junior Duck Stamp Art Contest. The annual Junior Duck Stamp Art Contest is a program created to encourage students to learn about the birds living near them. Students choose a bird to learn about, then create an art piece to submit. The art contest is open to K-12 public, private, and home school students. The BRMBR and U.S. Fish and Wildlife Service select winning entries to feature on the official Federal Duck Stamp each year. The art contest is open to K-12 public, private, and home school students.

As part of the U.S. Fish and Wildlife Service, the BRMBR participates in The America’s Wild Read program. Every three months a book is selected to “inspire a deeper connection with nature through conservation literature.” Then, the U.S. Fish and Wildlife Service Library hosts a quarterly online book discussion to foster environmental stewardship. Books from timeless classics to modern publications examine ecological topics, wildlife preservation, and our role in protecting natural habitats. Participation in the program encourages readers to engage in the rhetorical discussions around conservation, species challenges, and how to be better stewards of the natural world. Protecting nature, land, waters, plants and wildlife is a shared responsibility.

=== Conservation through Education ===
Education is an important piece of the conservation efforts at the refuge. Teaching the history and stories of the BRMBR can inspire future generations of conservationists. A Weber State University newspaper article by Bonnie Nelson about BRMBR shared that "The idea behind the education is to promote caring. A person must understand what is happening to care about what is happening." Kathi Stopher, an instructional system specialist at the BRMBR, regarding education stated, "At its essence is conservation of habitat to sustain life...there is nothing like energy and passion to beget energy and passion."

Teachers and educators have many options for students and classes at Bear River Migratory Bird Refuge. ‘Lessons in a Trunk’ are premade, self-guided lessons available for 2 week check-out. Field trips to the refuge help students focus on ecology, the importance of wetlands, and the diversity of plant and animal life at the refuge.

== Amenities ==
The James V. Hansen Wildlife Education Center is located ¼ mile from Interstate 15, exit 363. The center features interactive exhibits, classrooms, a movie theater, an auditorium, restrooms, a gift shop, outdoor exploration areas, and walking trails. The Visitor Center is open Tuesday through Saturday, 10:00 am to 4:00 pm. The Auto Tour Route, Wetland Wonders, Bulrush Bridge, and Marsh Meander trails are open sunrise to sunset Monday through Sunday.

== Activities on the Refuge ==
James V. Hansen Wildlife Education Center at the Bear River Migratory Bird Refuge

The BRMBR offers a wide variety of activities in addition to the visitor's center and auto tour. Photography, wildlife viewing, birding, hiking, cycling, running, hunting, fishing, painting, and volunteering are options for visitors.

== See also ==
- National Wildlife Refuge
- List of National Wildlife Refuges
