= Phaon (disambiguation) =

Phaon is a boatman from Greek mythology, lover of Sappho.

Phaon may also refer to:

- Phaon (freedman) (fl. 1st century), a confidant of Roman emperor Nero
- Phaon (fiction), a character in The Faerie Queene
- Phaon (damselfly), a genus of damselfly
- Phyciodes phaon, or phaon crescent, a species of butterfly
- USS Phaon (ARB-3)
- Phaon, a play by the 4th–5th century poet Plato that survives in fragments

== See also ==
- Phaonia, very large genus from the fly family Muscidae
