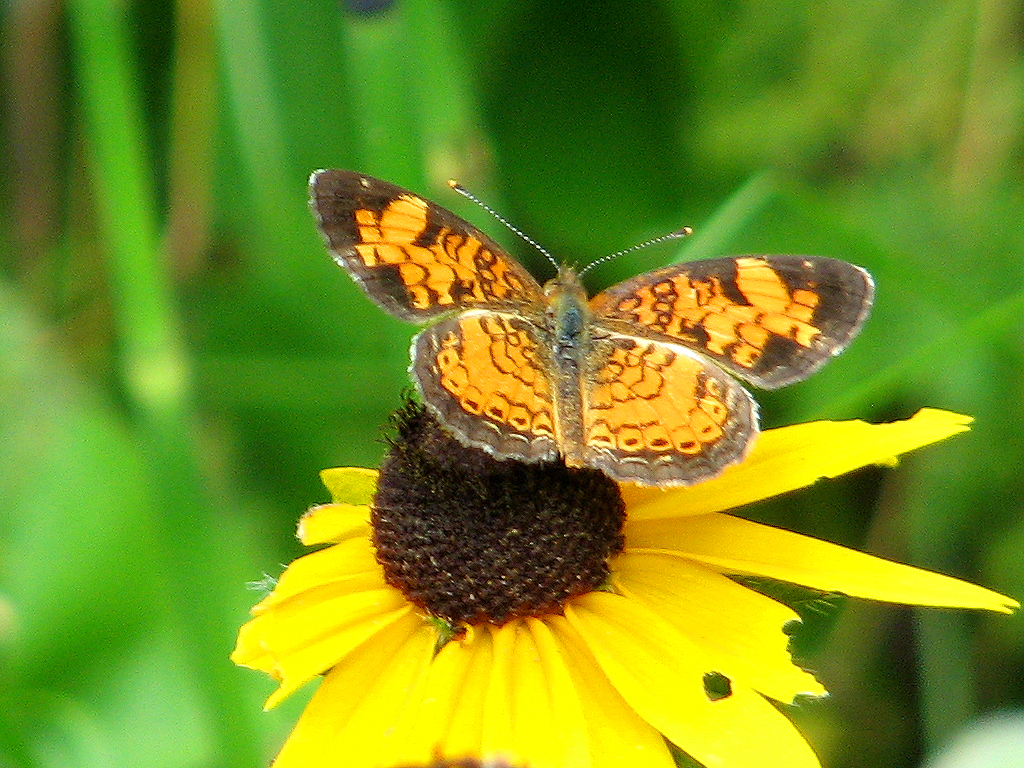
- Northern crescent, Ottawa, Ontario, Canada

Scientific classification
- Kingdom: Animalia
- Phylum: Arthropoda
- Clade: Pancrustacea
- Class: Insecta
- Order: Lepidoptera
- Family: Nymphalidae
- Subfamily: Nymphalinae
- Tribe: Melitaeini
- Subtribe: Phyciodina
- Genus: Phyciodes; Hübner, [1819]

Species
- See text

Synonyms
- Phiciodes

= Phyciodes =

Genus of butterflies

Phyciodes, the crescents or crescent spots (like some related genera) is a genus of butterflies of the subfamily Nymphalinae in the family Nymphalidae.

Crescent butterfly nectaring on yellow ironweed.

== Species ==
In alphabetical order:

- Phyciodes batesii (Reakirt, 1865) – tawny crescent
- Phyciodes campestris Behr, 1863
- Phyciodes cocyta (Cramer, [1777]) – northern crescent
- Phyciodes diminutor Scott, 1998
- Phyciodes eucrasia Zikán, 1937
- Phyciodes graphica (R. Felder, 1869) – Vesta crescent
- Phyciodes herlani Bauer, 1975
- Phyciodes melini Bryk, 1953
- Phyciodes metharmeoides (Fassl, 1922)
- Phyciodes mirabilis Hayward, 1967
- Phyciodes montana Behr, 1863
- Phyciodes mylitta (W. H. Edwards, 1861) – Mylitta crescent
- Phyciodes orseis W. H. Edwards, 1871 – Orseis crescent
- Phyciodes pallescens (R. Felder, 1869) – Mexican crescent
- Phyciodes pallida or Phyciodes pallidus (W. H. Edwards, 1864) – pale crescent or pallid crescentspot
- Phyciodes phaon (W. H. Edwards, 1864) – Phaon crescent
- Phyciodes picta (W. H. Edwards, 1865) – painted crescent
- Phyciodes pulchella (Boisduval, 1852) – field crescent
- Phyciodes texana (W. H. Edwards, 1863) – Texan crescent
- Phyciodes tharos (Drury, [1773]) – pearl crescent
- Phyciodes vesta (Edwards, 1869)
