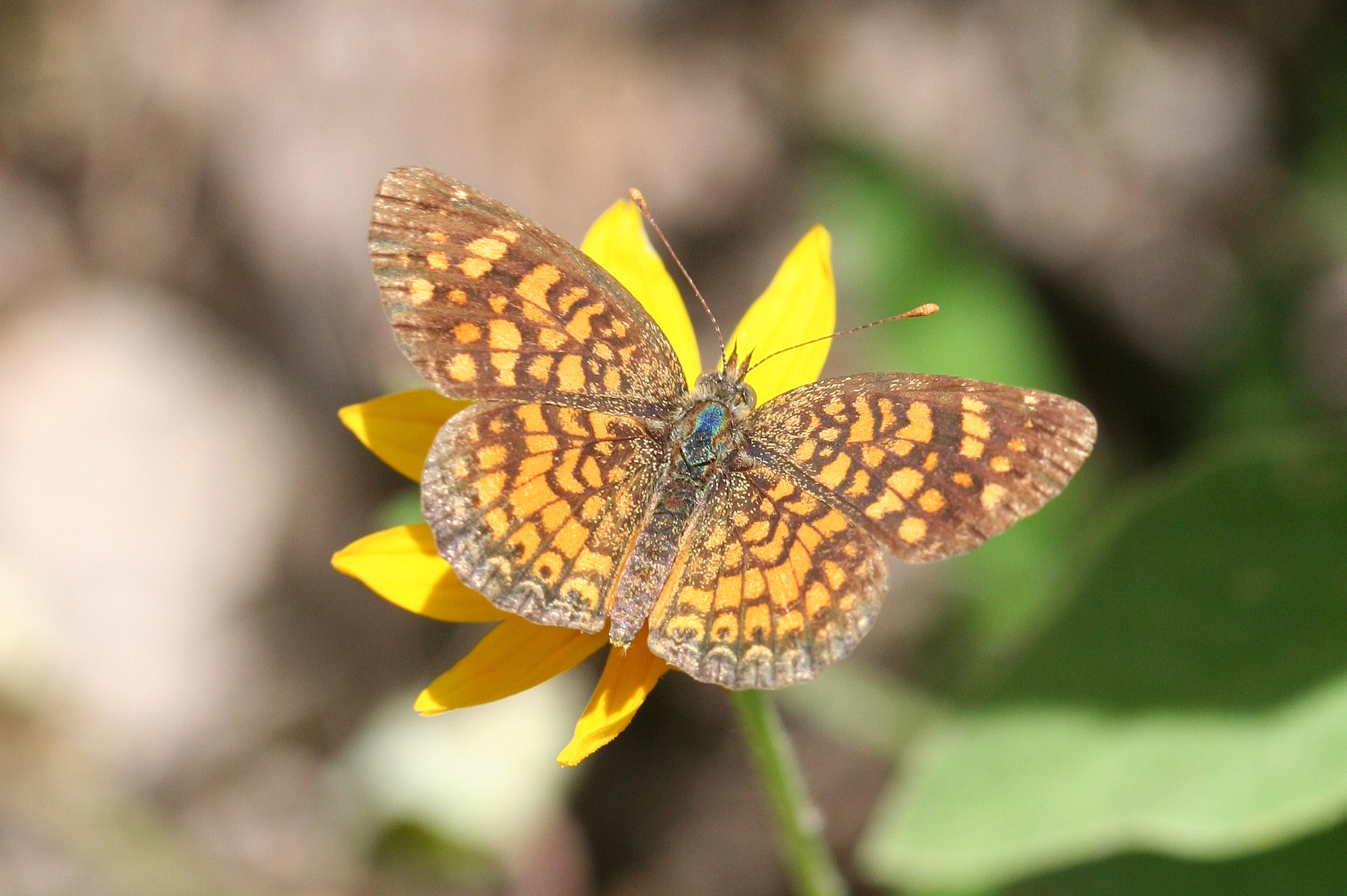

Scientific classification
- Domain: Eukaryota
- Kingdom: Animalia
- Phylum: Arthropoda
- Class: Insecta
- Order: Lepidoptera
- Family: Nymphalidae
- Genus: Phyciodes
- Species: P. graphica

Binomial name
- Phyciodes graphica (R. Felder, 1869)

= Phyciodes graphica =

Species of butterfly

Phyciodes graphica, the vesta crescent, is a species of crescents, checkerspots, anglewings, etc. in the butterfly family Nymphalidae.

The MONA or Hodges number for Phyciodes graphica is 4479.1.
