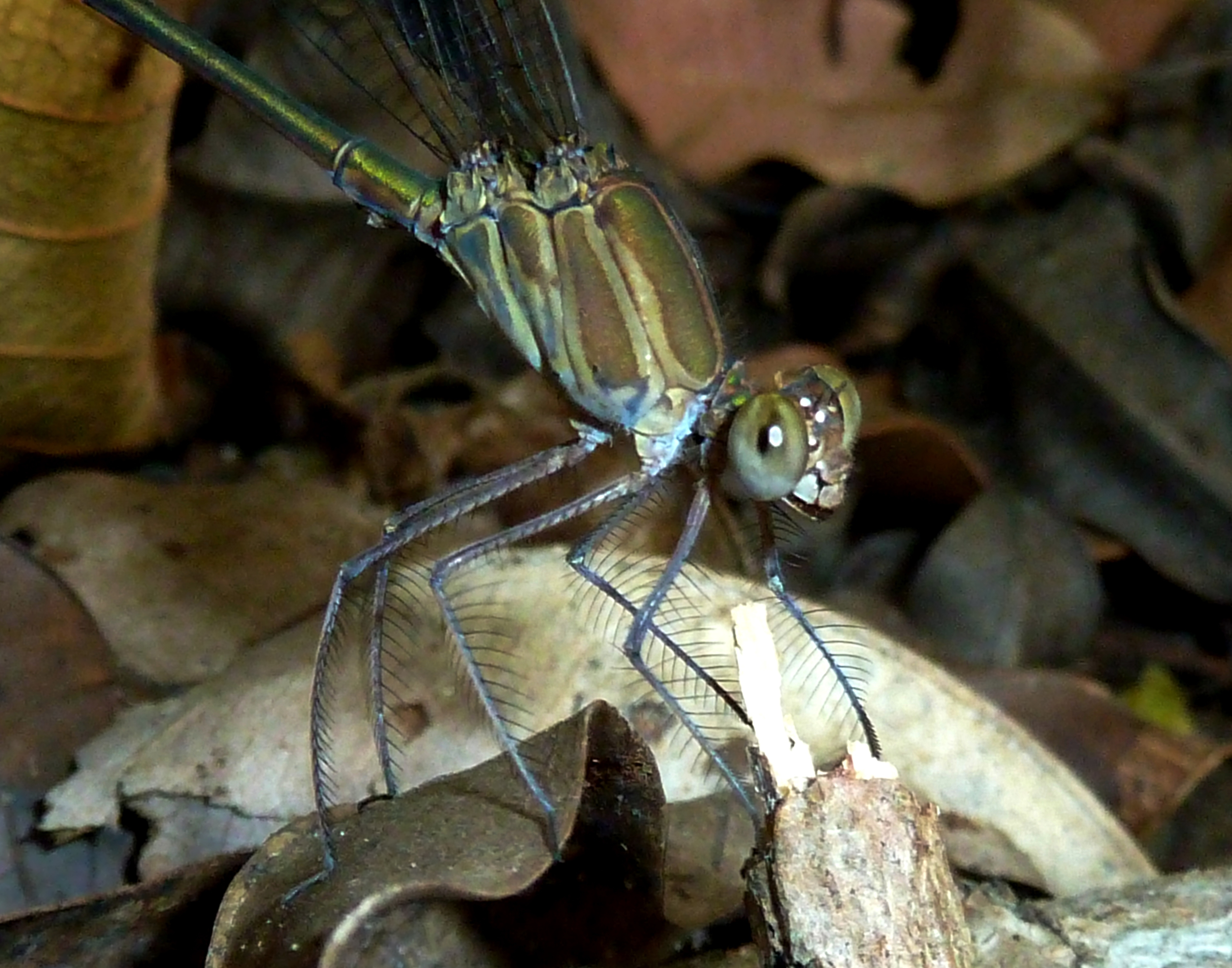
- male
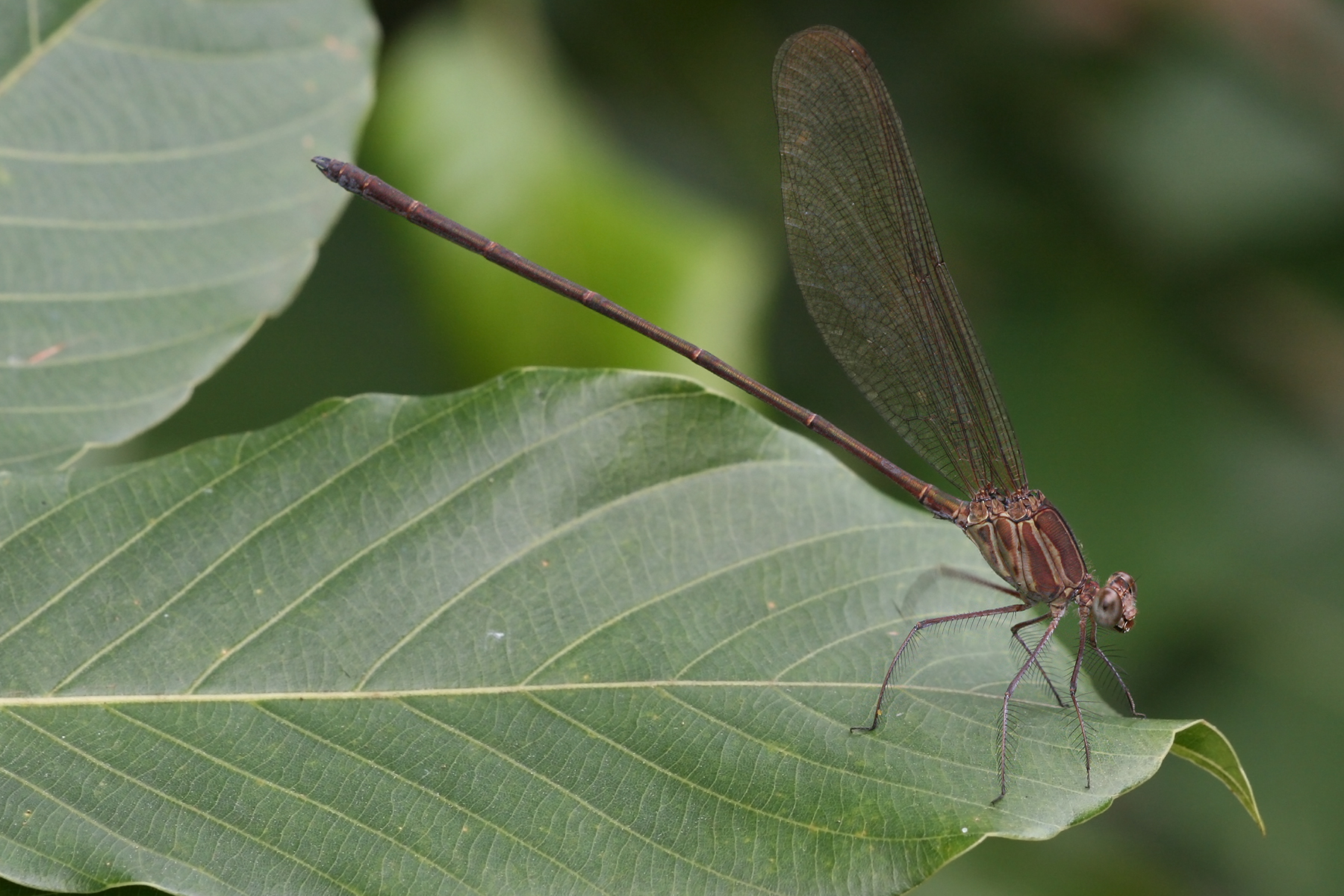
- female

Conservation status
- Least Concern (IUCN 3.1)

Scientific classification
- Kingdom: Animalia
- Phylum: Arthropoda
- Class: Insecta
- Order: Odonata
- Suborder: Zygoptera
- Family: Calopterygidae
- Genus: Phaon
- Species: P. iridipennis

Binomial name
- Phaon iridipennis (Burmeister, 1839)

Synonyms
- Calopteryx iridipennis (Burmeister, 1839); Phaon fuliginosus (Hagen, 1879); Phaon occidentalis (Foerster, 1906)

= Phaon iridipennis =

Glistening demoiselle

Species of damselfly

Phaon iridipennis, commonly known as the glistening demoiselle or glinsterjuffertjie, is a species of damselfly in the family Calopterygidae.

== Description ==
This is a large (length: up to 75 mm (3.0 in), wingspan: up to 87 mm (3.4 in)) damselfly with long legs. The common name comes from its iridescent wings, which sparkle with purple-blue flecks in the sunlight. The wings become more smoky with age. pterostigmata may or may not be present, although it is unclear what drives this difference. When present, they start off as light brown in colour and become darker with age. The thorax and abdomen are a coppery green in both sexes, although females are duller and browner than the males.

== Distribution and habitat ==
This species is common and widespread. It is found in most countries in sub-Saharan Africa; from South Africa to Ethiopia and Senegal, particularly in more tropical areas. It also occurs on Madagascar.

It is most common along rivers and streams with gallery forest, but also occurs in coastal, dune and swamp forests, as well as the forested edges of pans and marshes. It is highly dependent on shade, and is rarely seen out in open sunlight. It does, however, sometimes occur in more open areas within forests.

== Ecology ==
It has been recorded all year round in the warmer regions, but is most active from October to March with a peak during late November. When at rest, the wings are held at a 45° angle and the abdomen is slightly raised. It is very cryptic when perched, but conspicuous in flight due to its iridescent wings and large size. When around water it perches low down on rocks and overhanging sticks. It is, however, frequently found far from water in forest undergrowth, particularly late in the season. They are normally found perched in dense, shady undergrowth, where they frequently perch on sticks and logs among the leaf litter. They usually occur within 2 metres (6.6 ft) of the ground.

== Conservation ==
This species is listed as being of least concern by the IUCN. It is fairly resilient to habitat change, including changing water turbidity. It can also tolerate at least some alien vegetation.
