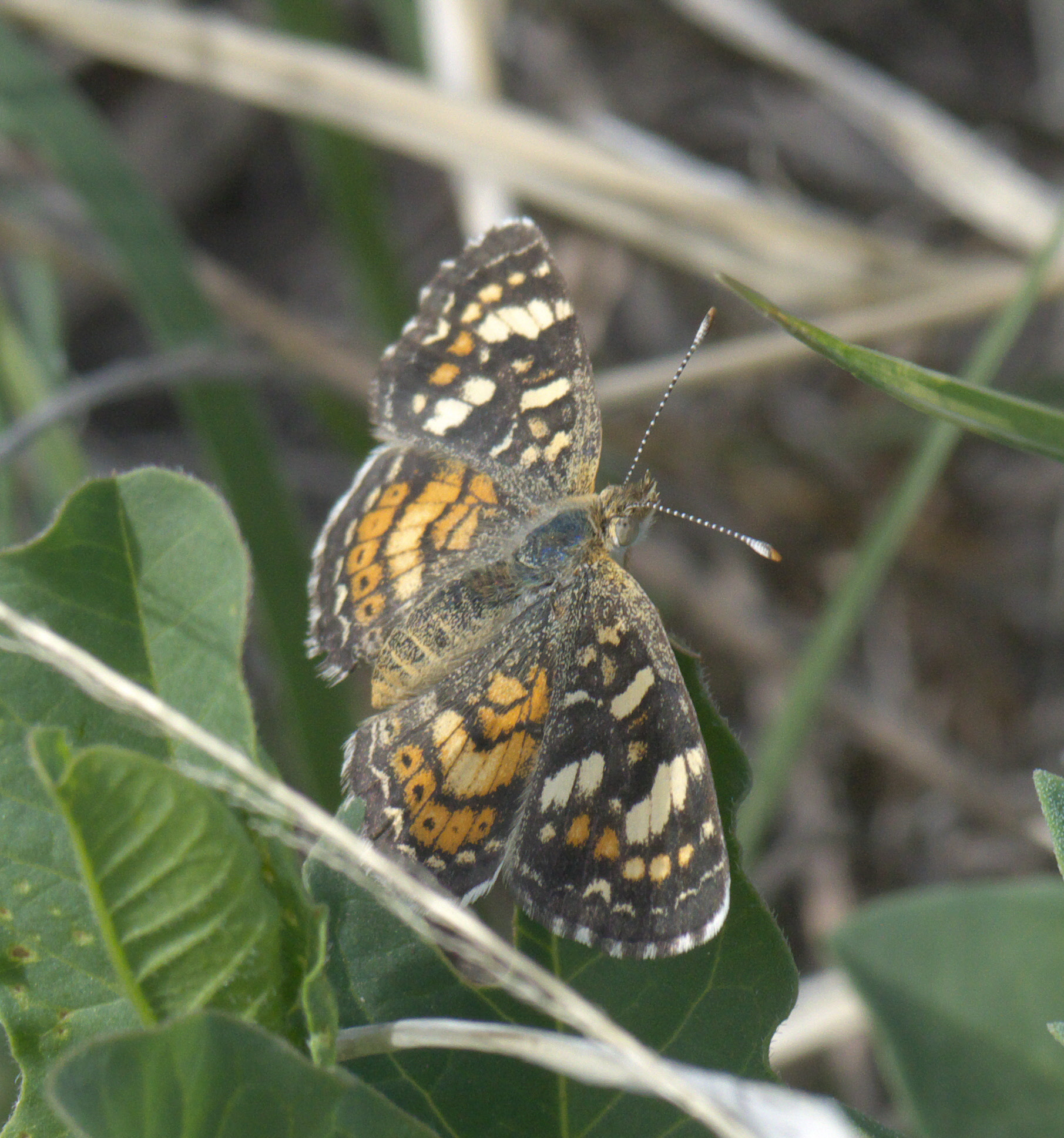

Scientific classification
- Kingdom: Animalia
- Phylum: Arthropoda
- Class: Insecta
- Order: Lepidoptera
- Family: Nymphalidae
- Subtribe: Phyciodina
- Genus: Phyciodes
- Species: P. picta

Binomial name
- Phyciodes picta (W. H. Edwards, 1865)

= Phyciodes picta =

Species of butterfly

Phyciodes picta, the painted crescent, is a species of crescents, checkerspots, anglewings, etc. in the butterfly family Nymphalidae. It is found in North America.

The MONA or Hodges number for Phyciodes picta is 4484.

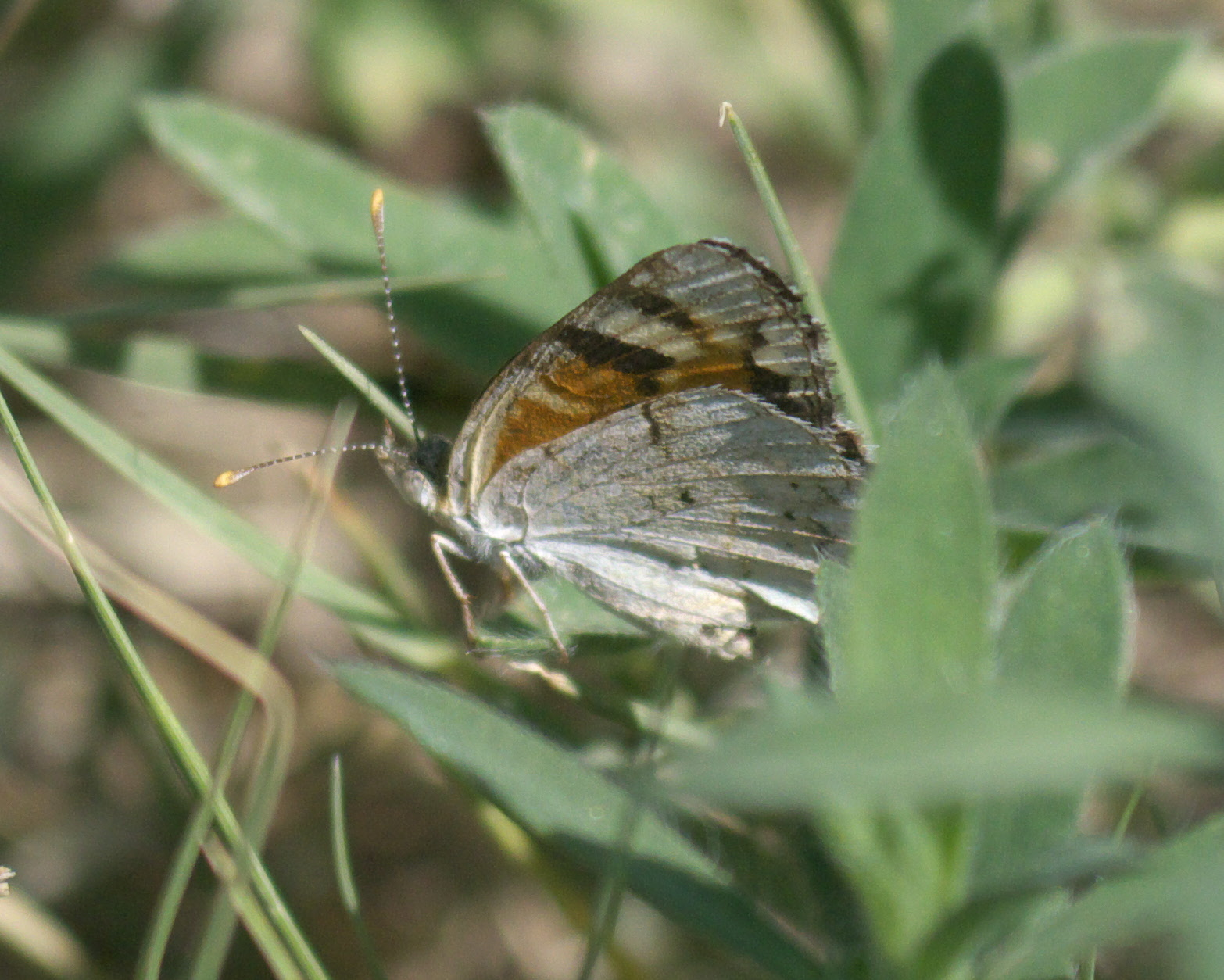
Painted crescent, Phyciodes picta

== Subspecies ==
These three subspecies belong to the species Phyciodes picta:

- Phyciodes picta canace W. H. Edwards, 1871
- Phyciodes picta pallescens Felder, 1869
- Phyciodes picta picta (W. H. Edwards, 1865)
