= Junior duck stamp =

Federal Junior Duck Stamp Art Contest
- Description: Art competition for students to promote conservation through wildlife art
- Country: United States
- Presented by: United States Fish and Wildlife Service
- Website: Official Website

The Federal Junior Duck Stamp is an American art competition sponsored by the United States government for students to draw, or paint a duck realistically. The national winner's design is used to create a (non-postal) stamp which is sold to raise funds for environmental education.

== Background ==
The program began in 1989 with a grant from the National Fish and Wildlife Foundation (NFWF) and was first recognized by the United States Congress in 1994 when the Junior Duck Stamp Conservation and Design Program Act was enacted.

Entries in the contest may be paintings or drawings. The program is designed to be "a dynamic arts curriculum that teaches wetlands and waterfowl conservation to students from kindergarten through high school". The best of show winner from each state participates in a national tour of entries and is forwarded to the national competition.

There is also a Conservation Message contest, where contestants are encouraged to write their own conservation messages about wildlife.

Each year, Junior Duck Stamp State Coordinators in all 50 U.S. states, American Samoa and the U.S. Virgin Islands help bring the Junior Duck Stamp Conservation and Design Program to more than 28,000 students. The Junior Duck Stamp Program established the Green Ribbon Award for State Coordinator of the Year to recognize coordinators for their contributions to the program. In 2011, the award went to Marilyn Gamette of California. Gamette had been involved with the JDS program since its inception in 1989, working to expand it in California. In 2011, the state received 3,126 pieces of artwork, setting state and national records. Throughout her career and into her retirement from the Sacramento National Wildlife Refuge Complex, Gamette contributed to the program through educational activities and outreach to children and adults.

There was controversy in 2013 when the competition's youngest ever national winner, a six-year-old girl, was stripped of her win because of accusations of plagiarism. A few days later she was reinstated as the winner, after the US Fish & Wildlife Service decided the competition had been fair, despite the child using a tracing technique. Her design was used for the $5 stamp and she received a $5,000 scholarship.

== Winners ==
Year	Artist	Species	State	Age
1993-1994	Jason Parsons	Redhead	Illinois	16
1994-1995	Clark Weaver	Hooded merganser	Pennsylvania	17
1995-1996	Jie Huang	Northern pintail	Montana	16
1996-1997	Clark Weaver	Canvasback	Pennsylvania	18
1997-1998	Scott Russell	Canada goose	California	17
1998-1999	Erik Peterson	American black duck	Michigan	18
1999-2000	Ryan Kirby	Wood duck	Illinois	16
2000-2001	Bonnie Latham	Northern pintail	Minnesota	16
2001-2002	Aremy McCann	Trumpeter swan	Minnesota	18
2002-2003	Nathan Closson	Mallard	Montana	16
2003-2004	Nathan Bauman	Green-winged teal	Pennsylvania	17
2004-2005	Adam Nisbett	Fulvous whistling-duck	Missouri	17
2005-2006	Kerissa Nelson	Ring-necked duck	Wisconsin	16
2006-2007	Rebekah Nastav,	Redhead	Missouri	15
2007-2008	Paul Willey	American wigeon	Arkansas	16
2008-2009	Seokkyun Hong	Nene	Texas	18
2009-2010	Lily Spang	Wood duck	Ohio	16
2010-2011	Rui Huang	Hooded merganser	Ohio	18
2011-2012	Abraham Hunter	Ring-necked duck	Illinois	17
2012-2013	Christine Clayton	Northern pintail	Ohio	17
2013-2014	Madison Grimm	Canvasback	South Dakota	6
2014-2015	Si youn Kim	King eider	New Jersey	16
2015-2016	Andrew Kneeland	Wood duck	Wyoming	17
2016-2017	Stacy Shen	Roos's goose	California	16
2017-2018	Isaac Schreiber	Trumpeter swan	Virginia	12
2018-2019	Rayen Kang	Emperor goose	Georgia	17
2019-2020	Nicole Jeon	Harlequin duck	New York	16
2020-2021	Madison Grimm	Wood duck	South Dakota	13
2021-2022	Margaret McMullen	Hooded merganser	Kansas	18
2022-2023	Madison Grimm	Green-winged teal	South Dakota	15
2023-2024	Mila Linyue Tong,	Hooded merganser	Virginia	15
2024-2025	Emily Lian	King eider	Oregon	17
2025-2026	Catheryn Liang	Northern shoveler	Texas	18
2026-2027	Nina Liang	Blue-winged teal	Texas	17
