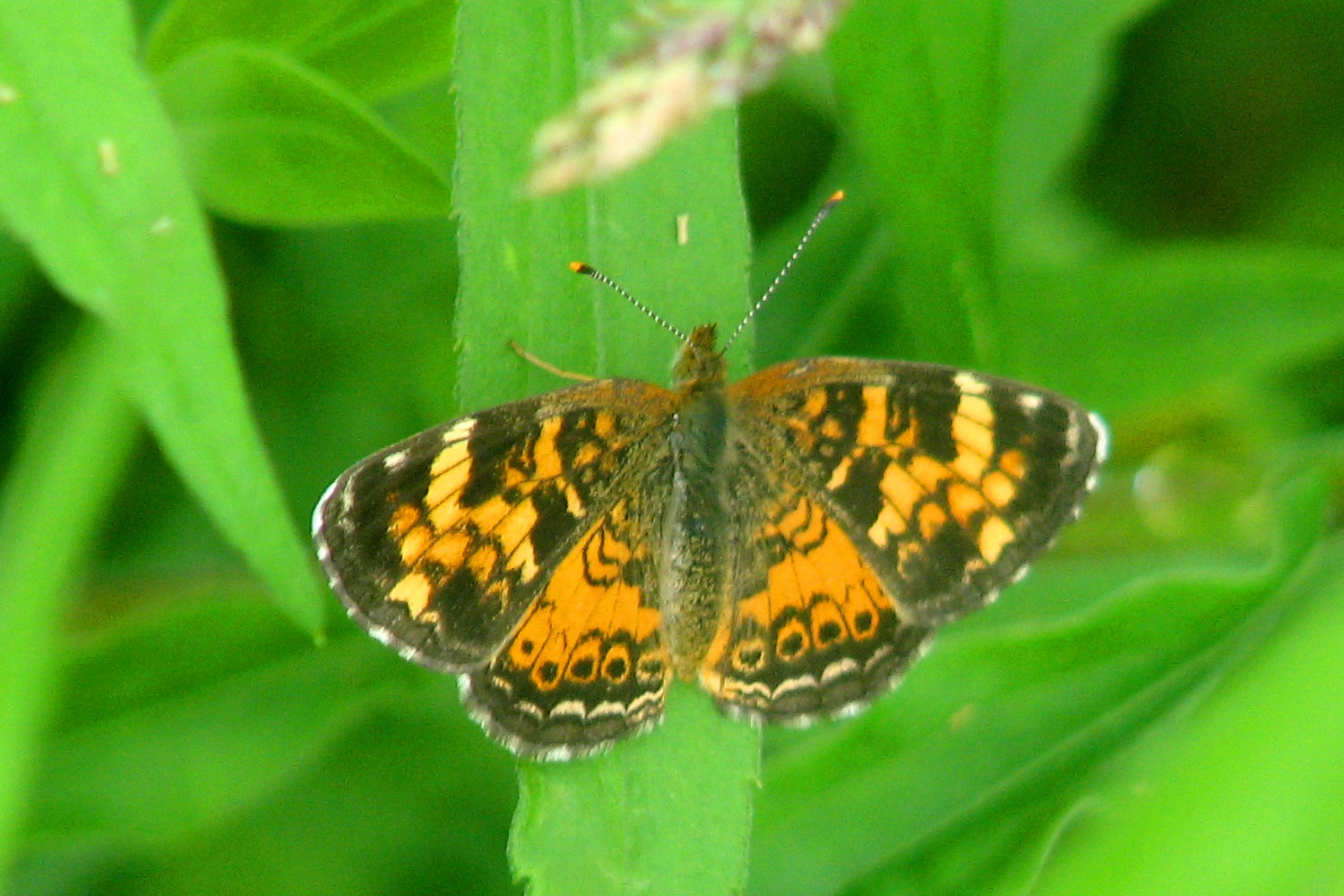
- Ottawa, Ontario, Canada

Conservation status
- Vulnerable (NatureServe)

Scientific classification
- Kingdom: Animalia
- Phylum: Arthropoda
- Class: Insecta
- Order: Lepidoptera
- Family: Nymphalidae
- Genus: Phyciodes
- Species: P. batesii

Binomial name
- Phyciodes batesii (Reakirt, 1865)

Subspecies
- P. b. batesii; P. b. lakota (Scott, 1994); P. b. anasazi (Scott, 1994); P. b. apsaalooke (Scott, 1994); P. b. maconensis (Gatrelle, 1998)

= Phyciodes batesii =

Species of butterfly

Phyciodes batesii, the tawny crescent, is a butterfly of the family Nymphalidae that occurs in North America.

== Description ==
The upperside is dark brown with orange and the forewing has a pale postmedian band with submarginal bands. The female's black submarginal band has dots. Both sexes have black and white antenna knobs. The wingspan is from 25 to 38 mm.

== Life cycle ==
Adults fly once a year between May and July. There is sometimes a partial second brood in Michigan. During this time the females lay their eggs in groups on the host plants. The fourth-instar caterpillars hibernate.

=== Larval foods ===
- Symphyotrichum undulatum

=== Adult foods ===
- Flower nectar

== Similar species ==
- Phyciodes cocyta – northern crescent
- Phyciodes tharos – pearl crescent
