= Avian botulism =

Paralytic disease caused by the Botulinum neurotoxin

Avian botulism is a strain of botulism that affects wild and captive bird populations, most notably waterfowl. This is a paralytic disease brought on by the Botulinum neurotoxin (BoNt) of the bacterium Clostridium botulinum. C. botulinum can fall into one of 7 different types which are strains A through G. Type C BoNt is most frequently associated with waterfowl mortality. The Type E strain is also commonly associated with avian outbreaks and is frequently found in fish species which is why most outbreaks occur in piscivorous birds.

Avian Botulism occurs all over the world and its understanding is important for wildlife managers, hunters, bird watchers, and anyone who owns wetland property as this disease can account for over 1,000,000 waterbird deaths in a year.

== Prevalence and distribution ==
Avian botulism occurs all over the world and is especially predominant in North American wetlands. The degree of avian botulism outbreaks in populations is largely determined by how favorable conditions are for C. botulinum. Ideal conditions for the presence of the BoNt carrying bacterium consist of low-oxygen, high-protein available substrate. This is common of shallow and stagnant waterways. Other factors such as pH and temperature, as well as a likely number of unknown factors contribute to the prevalence of outbreaks. Geographic locations with great amounts of this habitat can be assumed to have a greater number of outbreaks. Notable locations include the Great Lakes, North Dakota, Japan, South Korea, and Saskatchewan. While this is frequently the trend there is also evidence of BoNt outbreaks in well-oxygenated lakes with low temperatures. Furthermore, ideal habitats like those described do not all feature avian botulism in their waterfowl populations which supports there are still unknown factors at play. In recent time, nearly 18000 migratory birds had fallen victim to this disease in India. The mass mortality has been reported in 2019 from Sambhar Lake, Rajasthan, which is also a Ramsar site.

== Transmission ==
Avian botulism is not contagious in that it is not spread from bird to bird. Instead it is spread to birds through their consumptions of maggots infected with the toxin. Maggots become infected by feeding on substrates and organic material that host the Type C BoNt. Huge die offs caused by BoNt are the result of this maggot cycle. When an infected bird dies the maggots that feed off of it become infected themselves. These maggots are in turn consumed by additional birds. Thus with every infected carcass brings several infected maggots which increases the number of birds that can contract the disease. In this way massive outbreaks can occur.

== Clinical signs ==
The botulinum neurotoxin is lethal because it causes paralysis. Field identification involves locating birds showing flaccidity in the legs, wings and neck, as well as the presence of protuberant nictitating membrane. The presence of several dozen, or even hundreds, of fresh waterbird carcasses is the stereotypical sign an outbreak has occurred. In this case the specimens need to be taken to disease laboratory to determine the cause of mortality. Most commonly, detection of C. botulinum in carcasses during lab work is accomplished through analysis of polymerase chain reactions (PCR) and is often the most successful method.

== Prevention and control ==
The presence of avian botulism is extremely hard to detect before an outbreak. Frequent surveillance of sites at risk is needed for early detection of the disease in order to take action and remove carcasses. Vaccines are also developed, but they are expected to have limited effectiveness in stemming outbreaks in wild waterbird populations. However may be effective in reducing mortality for endangered island waterfowl and small non-migratory wild populations. Field tests are needed.
