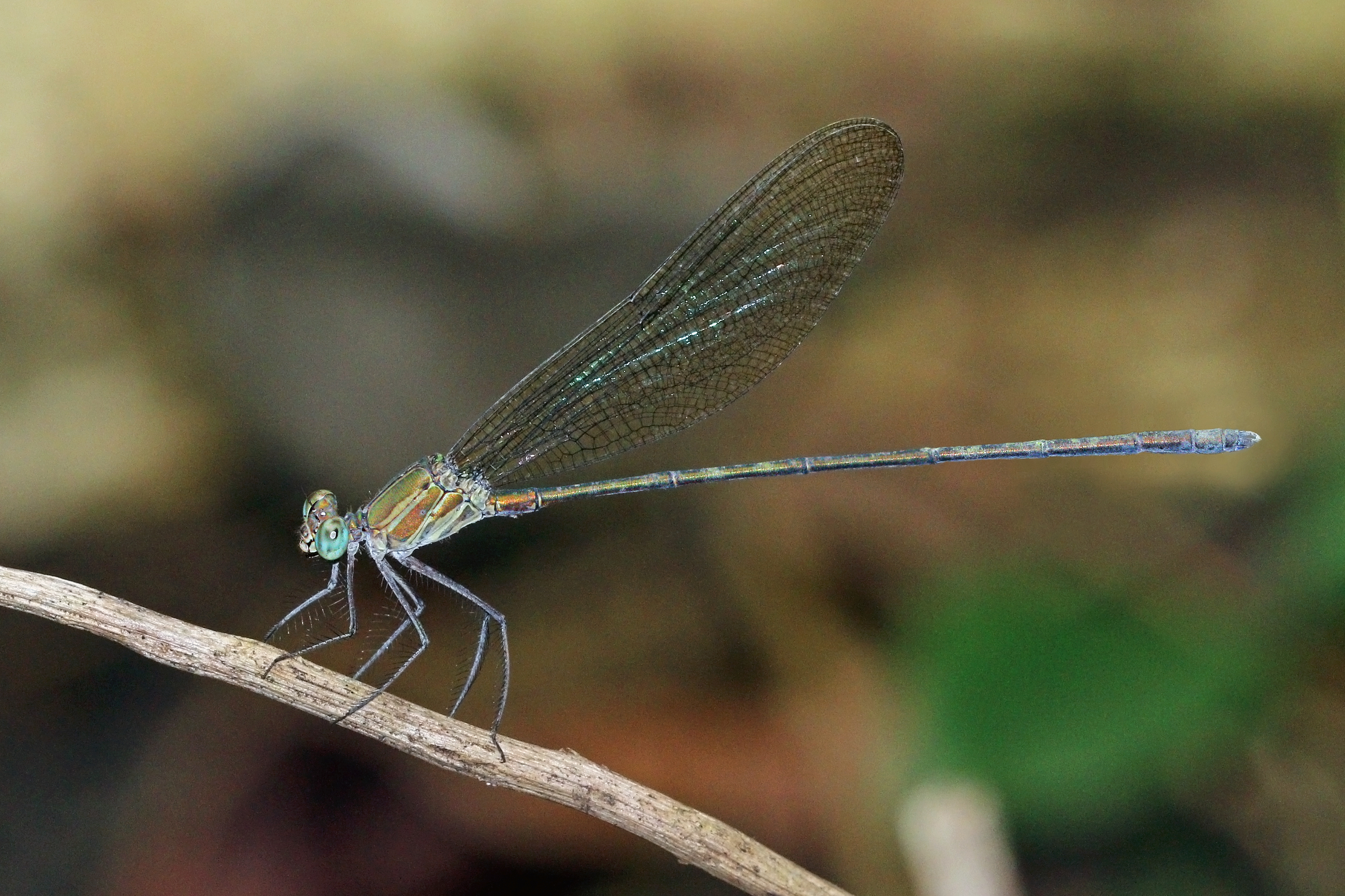
- Male Phaon iridipennis, Ghana

Scientific classification
- Kingdom: Animalia
- Phylum: Arthropoda
- Clade: Pancrustacea
- Class: Insecta
- Order: Odonata
- Suborder: Zygoptera
- Family: Calopterygidae
- Subfamily: Calopteryginae
- Tribe: Saphoini
- Genus: Phaon; Selys, 1853

= Phaon (damselfly) =

Genus of damselflies

Phaon is a small genus of damselflies belonging to the family Calopterygidae. They occur in central and southern Africa and Madagascar.

The genus contains three species:

Male	Female	Name	Distribution
		Phaon camerunensis Sjöstedt, 1900 – Forest Flashwing	Bonge, Cameroon
		Phaon iridipennis (Burmeister, 1839) – Glistening Demoiselle	Tanzania, South Africa
		Phaon rasoherinae	Madagascar
