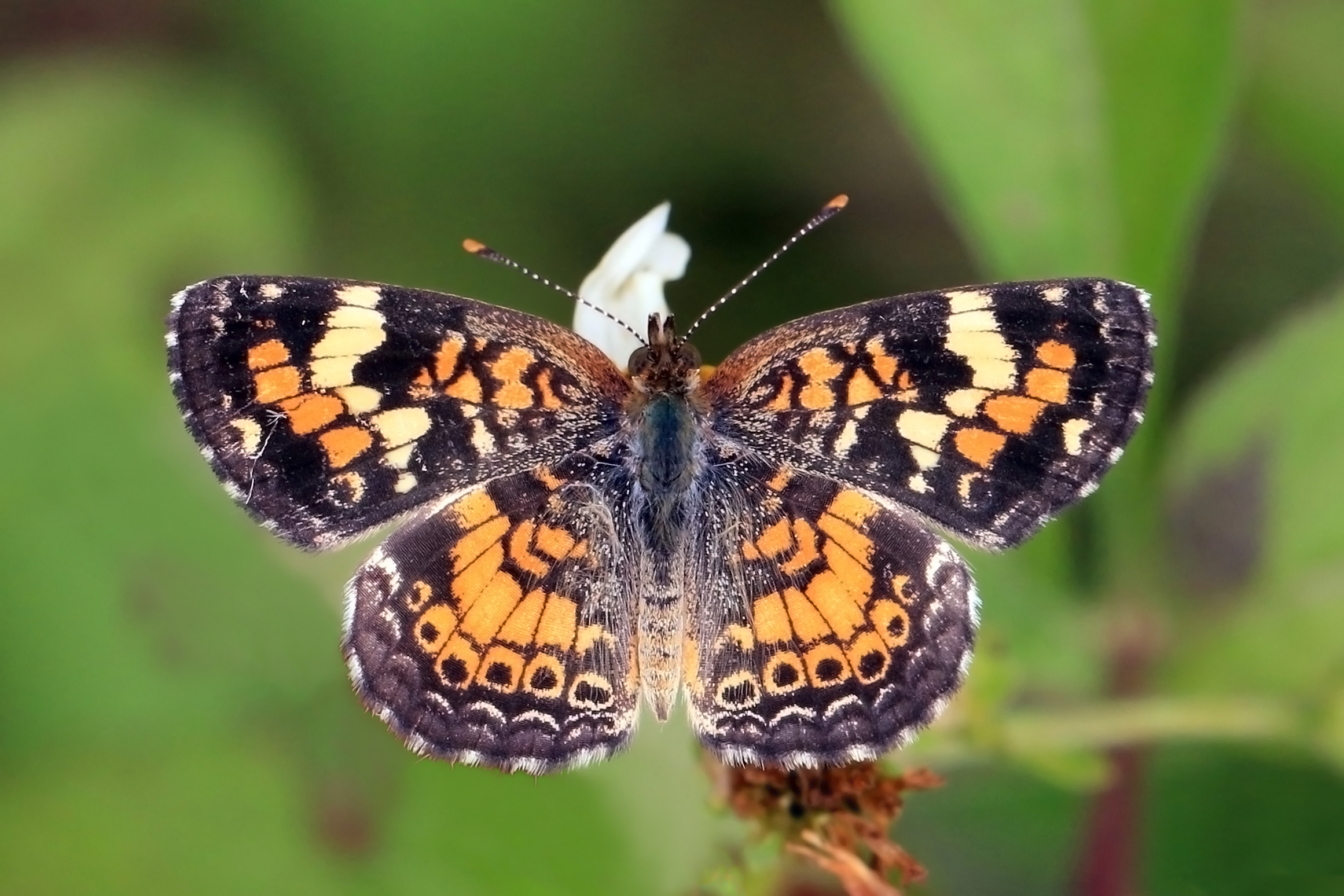

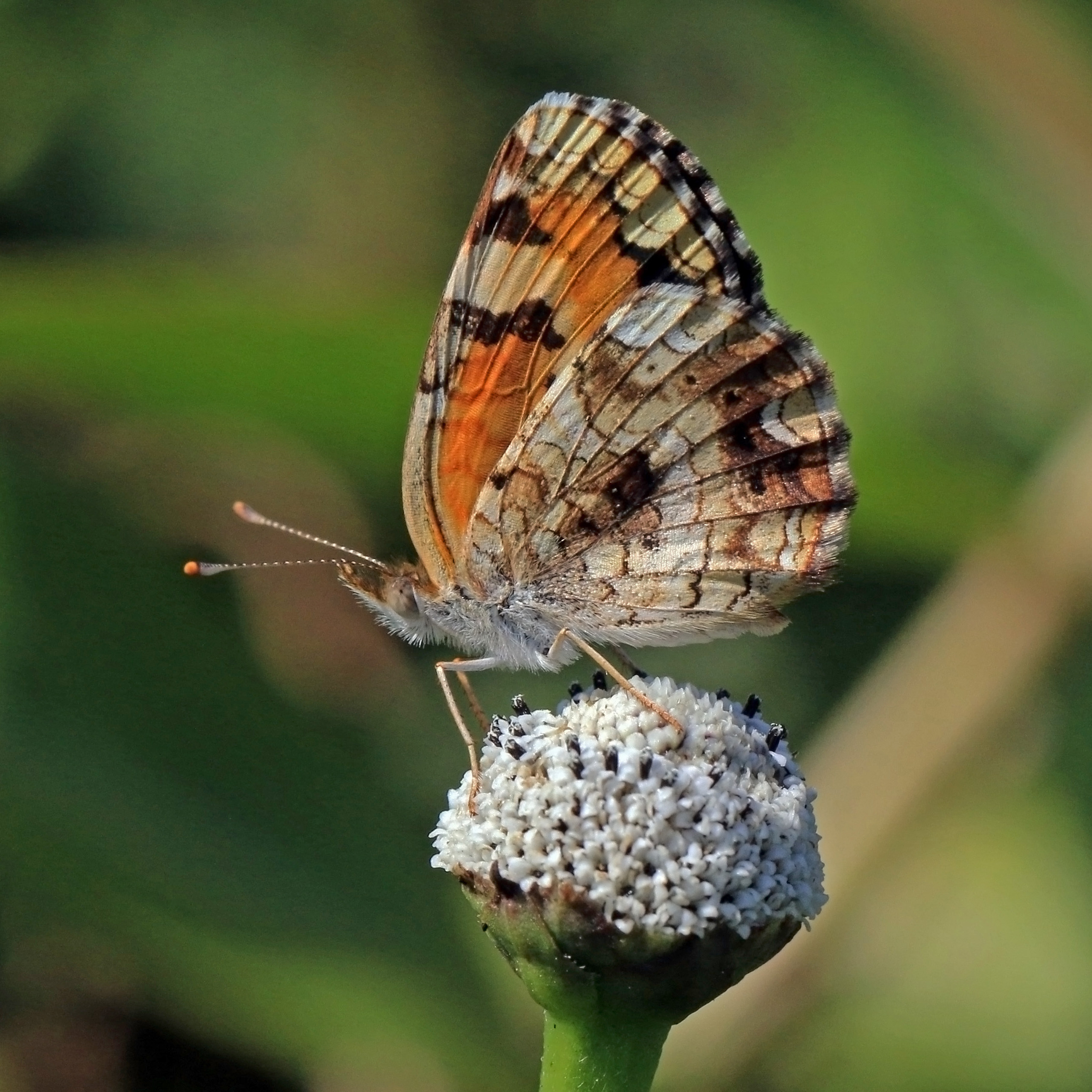
- Both on Grand Cayman

Conservation status
- Secure (NatureServe)

Scientific classification
- Kingdom: Animalia
- Phylum: Arthropoda
- Clade: Pancrustacea
- Class: Insecta
- Order: Lepidoptera
- Family: Nymphalidae
- Genus: Phyciodes
- Species: P. phaon

Binomial name
- Phyciodes phaon (W.H. Edwards, 1864 )

= Phyciodes phaon =

Species of butterfly

Phyciodes phaon, the Phaon crescent or mat plant crescent, is a species of butterfly found in Florida, neighboring states, west to New Mexico and south to Cuba (since the 1930s) and the Cayman Islands where it is known as the crescent spot.

== Mating behavior ==
There are several flights (early spring to late fall) in the northern part of the range and nearly year round in peninsular Florida. Males patrol open areas near host plants for females. Mating occurs primarily during mid-day. Eggs are laid in clusters on the undersides of leaves of the fogfruit host plants. The common host throughout much of Florida is turkey tangle fogfruit (Phyla nodiflora).
