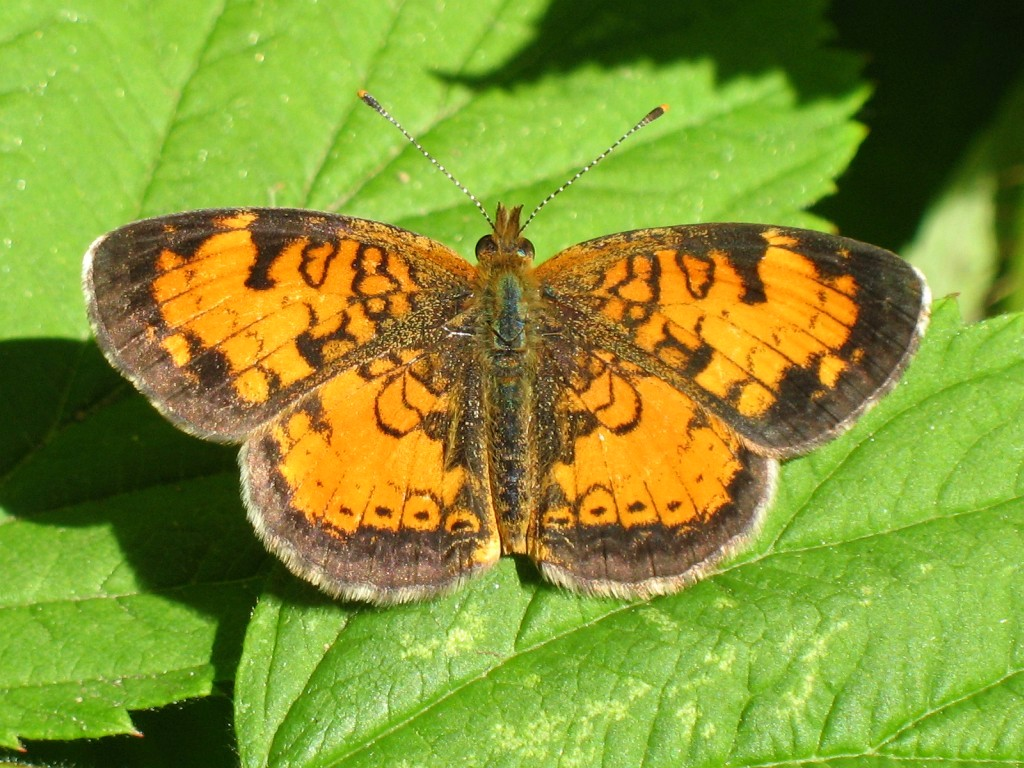

Scientific classification
- Domain: Eukaryota
- Kingdom: Animalia
- Phylum: Arthropoda
- Class: Insecta
- Order: Lepidoptera
- Family: Nymphalidae
- Genus: Phyciodes
- Species: P. cocyta

Binomial name
- Phyciodes cocyta (Cramer, [1777])

Synonyms
- Phyciodes selenis

= Phyciodes cocyta =

Northern crescent

Species of butterfly

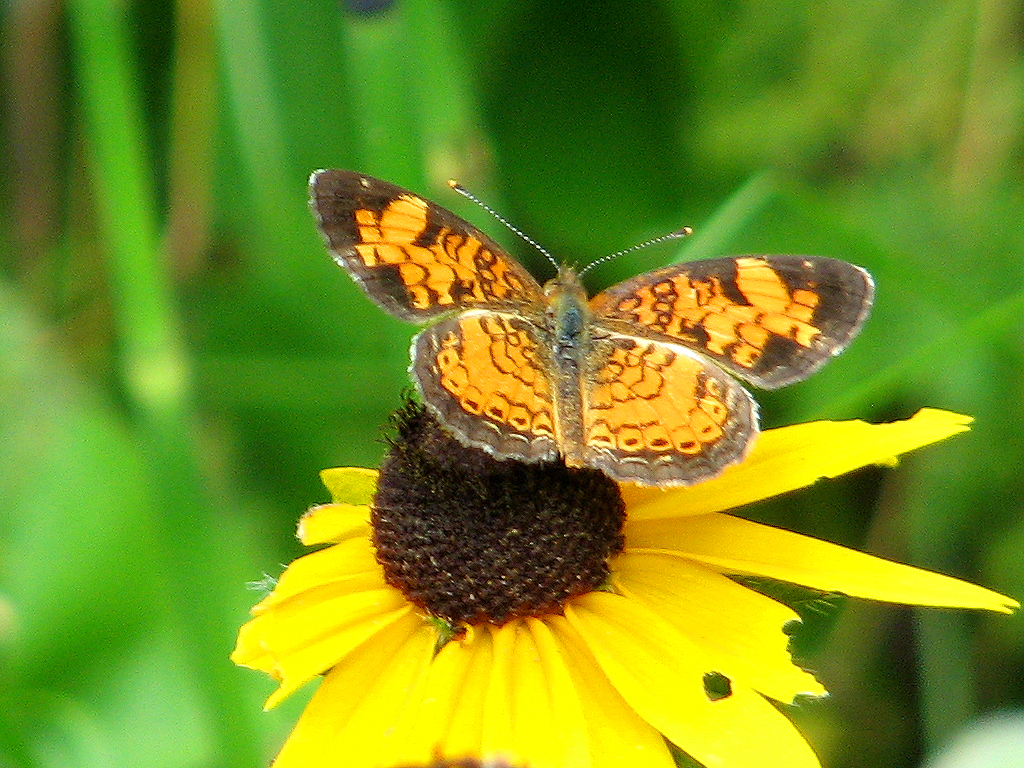
On black-eyed Susan, Ottawa, Ontario, Canada

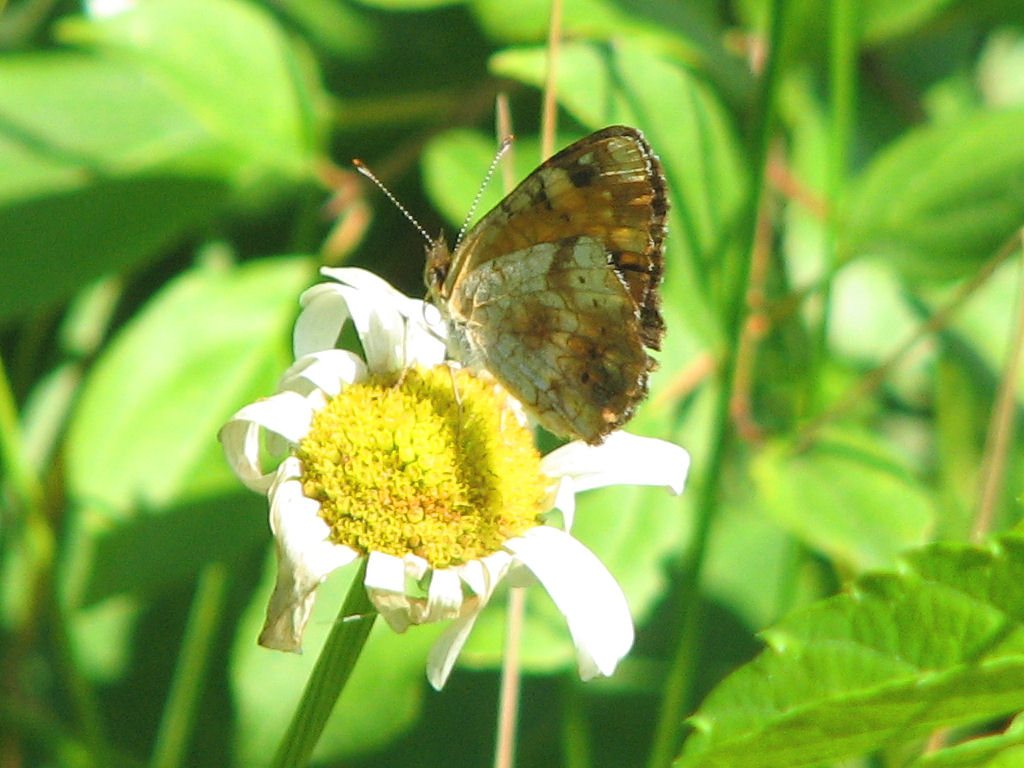
Ventral view

Phyciodes cocyta, the northern crescent, is a butterfly of the family Nymphalidae. It is found in the Nearctic realm.

The wingspan is 32–38 mm. The butterfly flies from June to July depending on the location. Its habitats include fields, meadows, glades, and openings in woodlands.

The larvae feed on Asteraceae species. Adults feed on nectar from dogbane, fleabane, and white clover.

== Similar species ==
- Phyciodes batesii – tawny crescent
- Phyciodes tharos – pearl crescent
