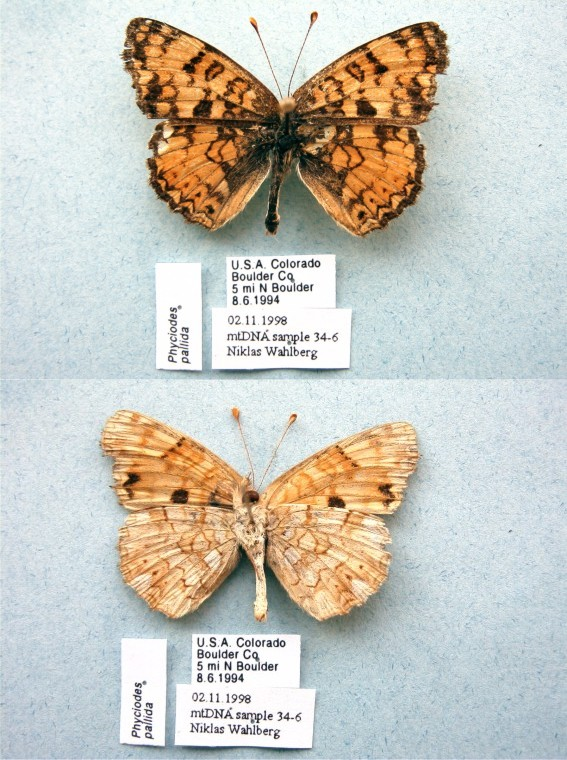

Scientific classification
- Kingdom: Animalia
- Phylum: Arthropoda
- Class: Insecta
- Order: Lepidoptera
- Family: Nymphalidae
- Genus: Phyciodes
- Species: P. pallida

Binomial name
- Phyciodes pallida (W.H. Edwards, 1864)

Synonyms
- Melitaea pallida Edwards, 1864; Eresia mata Reakirt, 1866; Phyciodes pratensis Röber, 1913; Phyciodes pallidus

= Phyciodes pallida =

Pale crescent

Species of butterfly

Phyciodes pallida, the pale crescent or pallid crescentspot, is a species of butterfly in the family Nymphalidae. It is found in western North America.

The wingspan is 33–44 mm. The butterfly flies in June in Canada.

The larvae feed on Cirsium species.

== Subspecies ==
Listed alphabetically:

- P. p. barnesi Skinner, 1897
- P. p. pallida

== Similar species ==
- Phyciodes mylitta – Mylitta crescent
