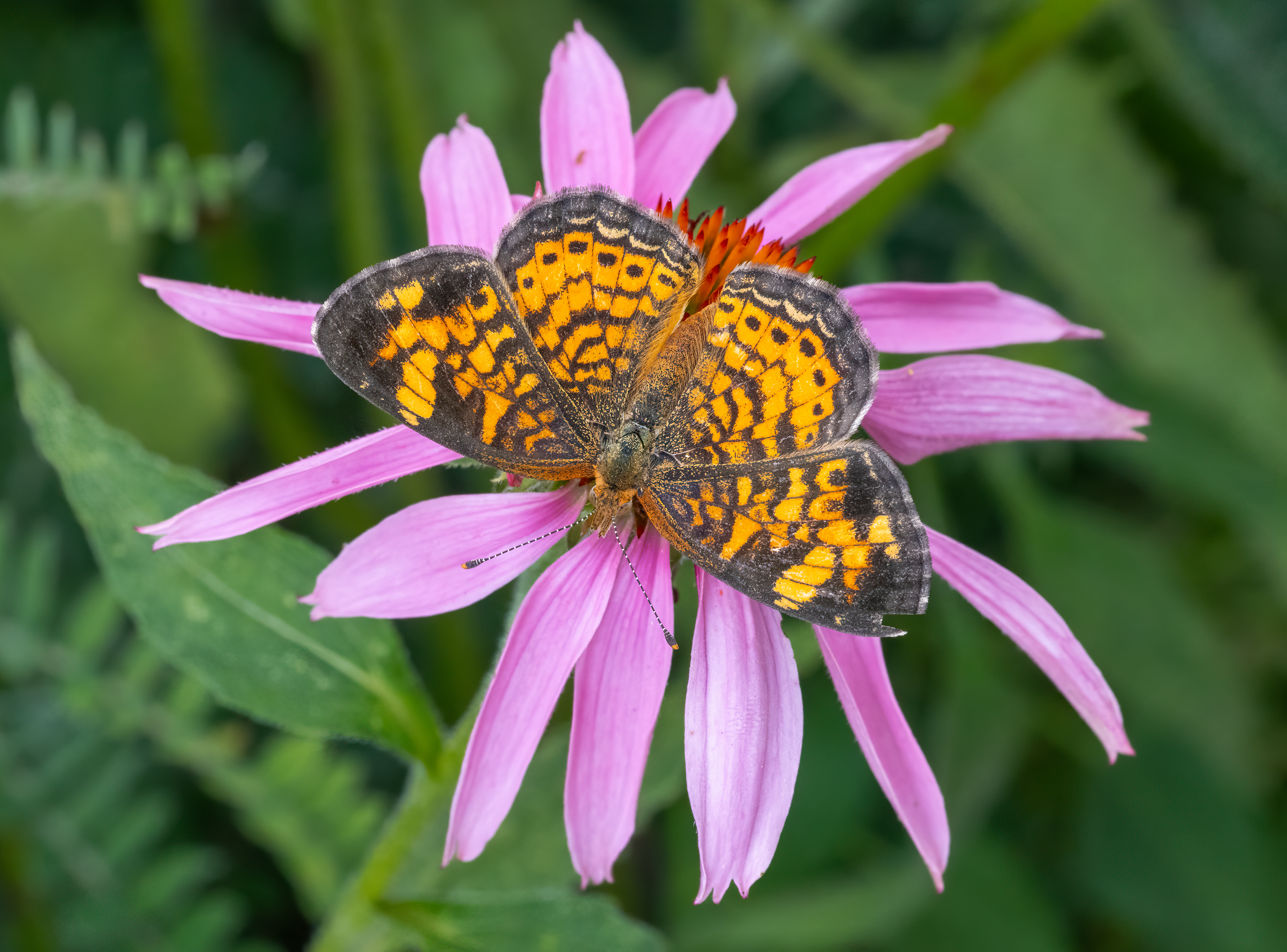
- Female

Conservation status
- Secure (NatureServe)

Scientific classification
- Kingdom: Animalia
- Phylum: Arthropoda
- Clade: Pancrustacea
- Class: Insecta
- Order: Lepidoptera
- Family: Nymphalidae
- Genus: Phyciodes
- Species: P. tharos

Binomial name
- Phyciodes tharos (Drury, [1773])

= Pearl crescent =

Species of butterfly

The pearl crescent (Phyciodes tharos) is a species of butterfly from North America. It is found in all parts of the United States except the west coast, and throughout Mexico and parts of southern Canada, in particular Ontario. Its habitat is open areas such as pastures, road edges, vacant lots, fields, open pine woods. Its pattern is quite variable. Males usually have black antenna knobs. Its upper side is orange with black borders; postmedian and submarginal areas are crossed by fine black marks. The underside of the hindwing has a dark marginal patch containing a light-colored crescent.

The wingspan is from 21 to 34 mm. The species has several broods throughout the year, from April–November in the north, and throughout the year in the deep south and Mexico.

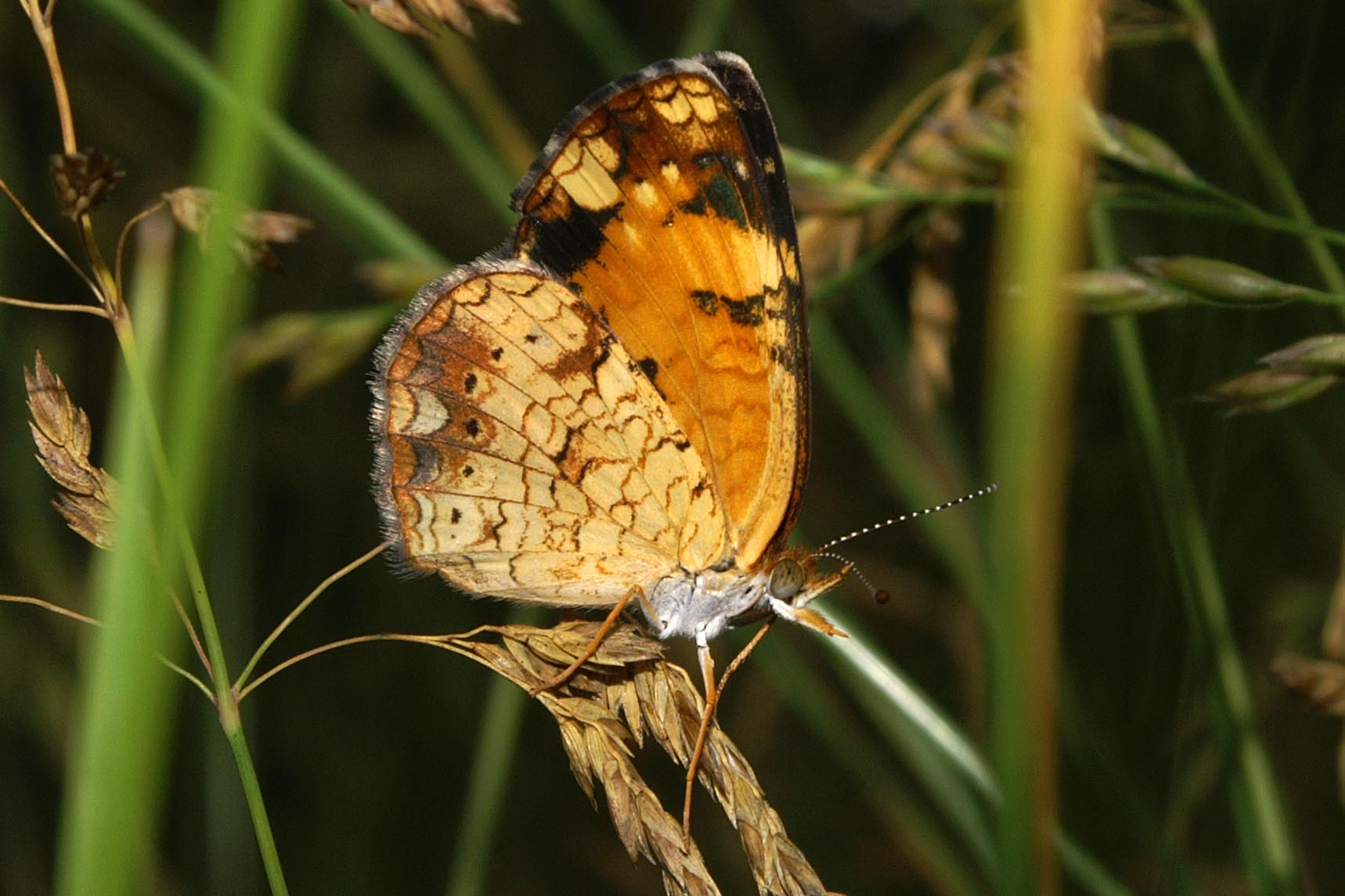
ventral view

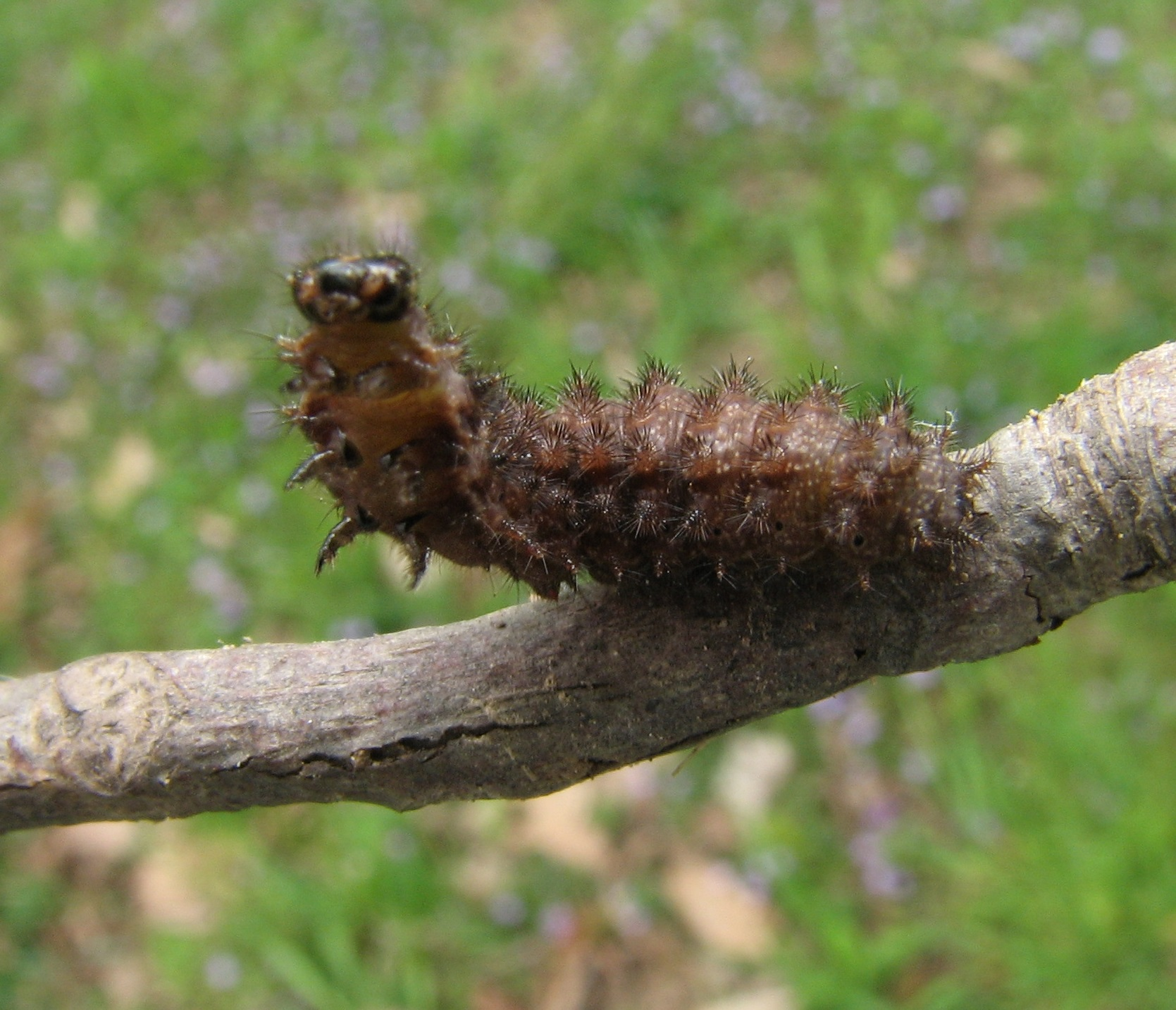
Caterpillar

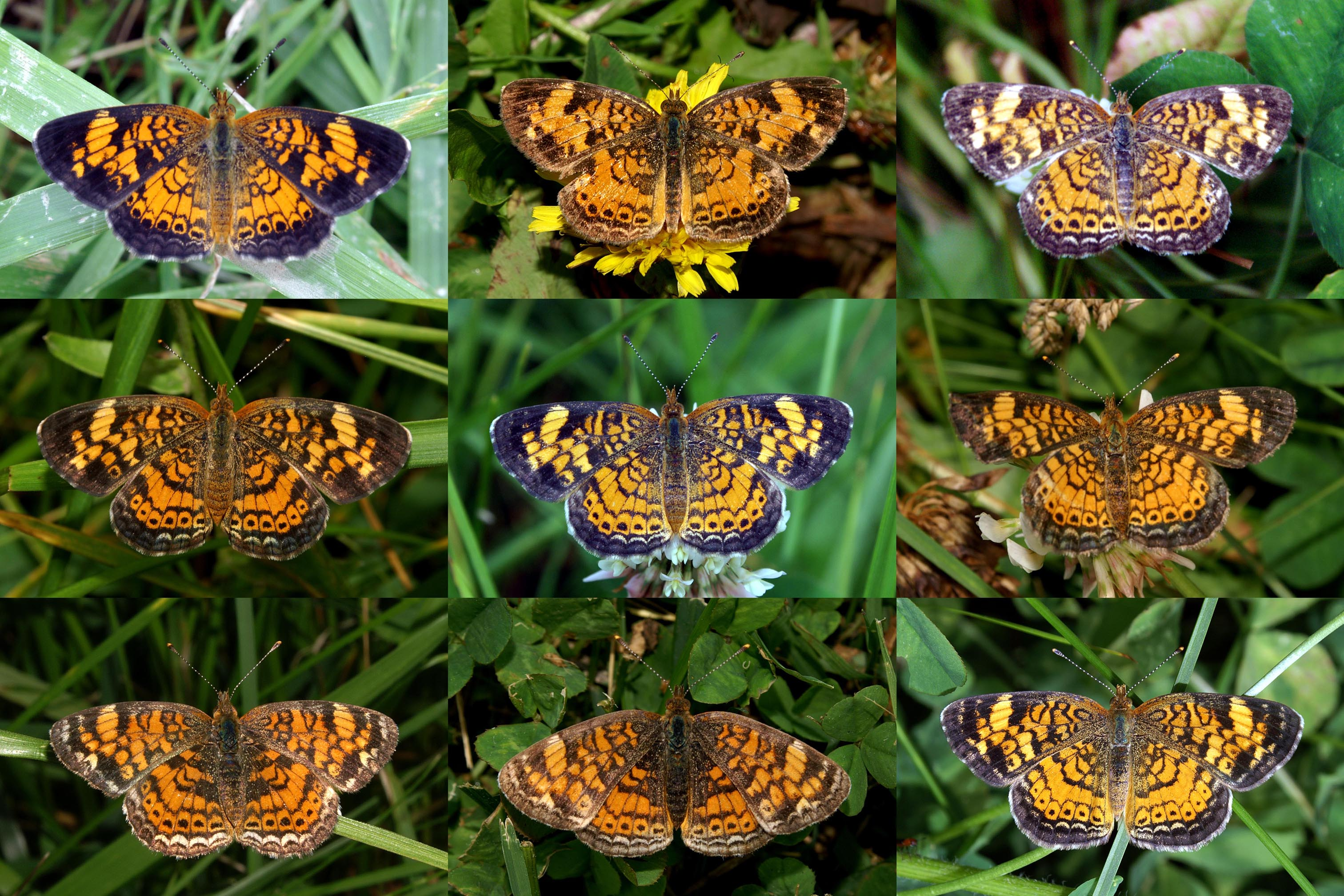
Composite showing the variation in this species

Adults find nectar from a great variety of flowers including dogbane, swamp milkweed, shepherd's needle, asters, and winter cress. Males patrol open areas for females. The eggs are laid in small batches on the underside of host plant leaves of aster species (family Asteraceae). Caterpillars eat the leaves and are gregarious when young. Hibernation is by third-stage caterpillars.

== Hybridization ==
Hybridization between Phyciodes tharos and other species of the genus, P. phaon and P. campestris montana, have been studied in the past. These studies were done to address the question as to whether or not variation through hybridization could arise and create a new species of Lepidoptera as a result. Furthermore, these specific butterflies were chosen because in the case of P. campestris montana and P. tharos, they share common larval food plants and habitat. In the case of P. phaon and P. tharos, these species are sympatric along roadsides and sandy areas in northern Florida. The reason for these studies is to investigate the effects of incompatible genomes and how they affect offspring viability and variation between species. As P. tharos span across the Americas and Canada, hybridization and interspecies breeding is a phenomenon that could lead to variety among species or infertility within offspring.

To study this, laboratory studies have been done to inspect the compatibility of Phyciodes tharos with other species. In Oliver's experimental hybridization of Phyciodes tharos with P. campestris montana, he states that "it is to be expected that the most sensitive test for genetic incompatibility between populations and species would be an assay of viability and fertility by laboratory hybridization". Even though the cross species were incompatible, it contributes to research on whether existing species of butterflies could cross breed and bring back variety within Lepidoptera.

== Relation to other species ==
Phyciodes tharos' large distribution spans from Mexico up to Canada. Specifically around the US' and Canada's border, other Phyciodes species can also be found aside Phyciodes tharos. This includes P. batesii, P. cocyta, and P. pulchella. This has raised the question whether these different Phyciodes species interbreed and how that has affected the genetic and phenotypic variation of the different Phyciodes species.

While all of these Lepidoptera share the same genus, their genomes have proven to be distinct, causing the variation in phenotype. For example, when comparing the antenna of the northern and pearl crescent, the northern crescent has orange antenna tips, while the pearl crescent's are black and white. In Wingert et al.'s study on the differentiation between the Phyciodes butterflies, they found that the genome sequence of all of these Lepidoptera was different because of the low levels of gene flow and hybridization. Even though these species are capable of hybridization, it shows how these butterflies have been able to maintain their separate genomes and not overly hybridize.

== Similar species ==
- Phyciodes batesii – tawny crescent
- Phyciodes cocyta – northern crescent
