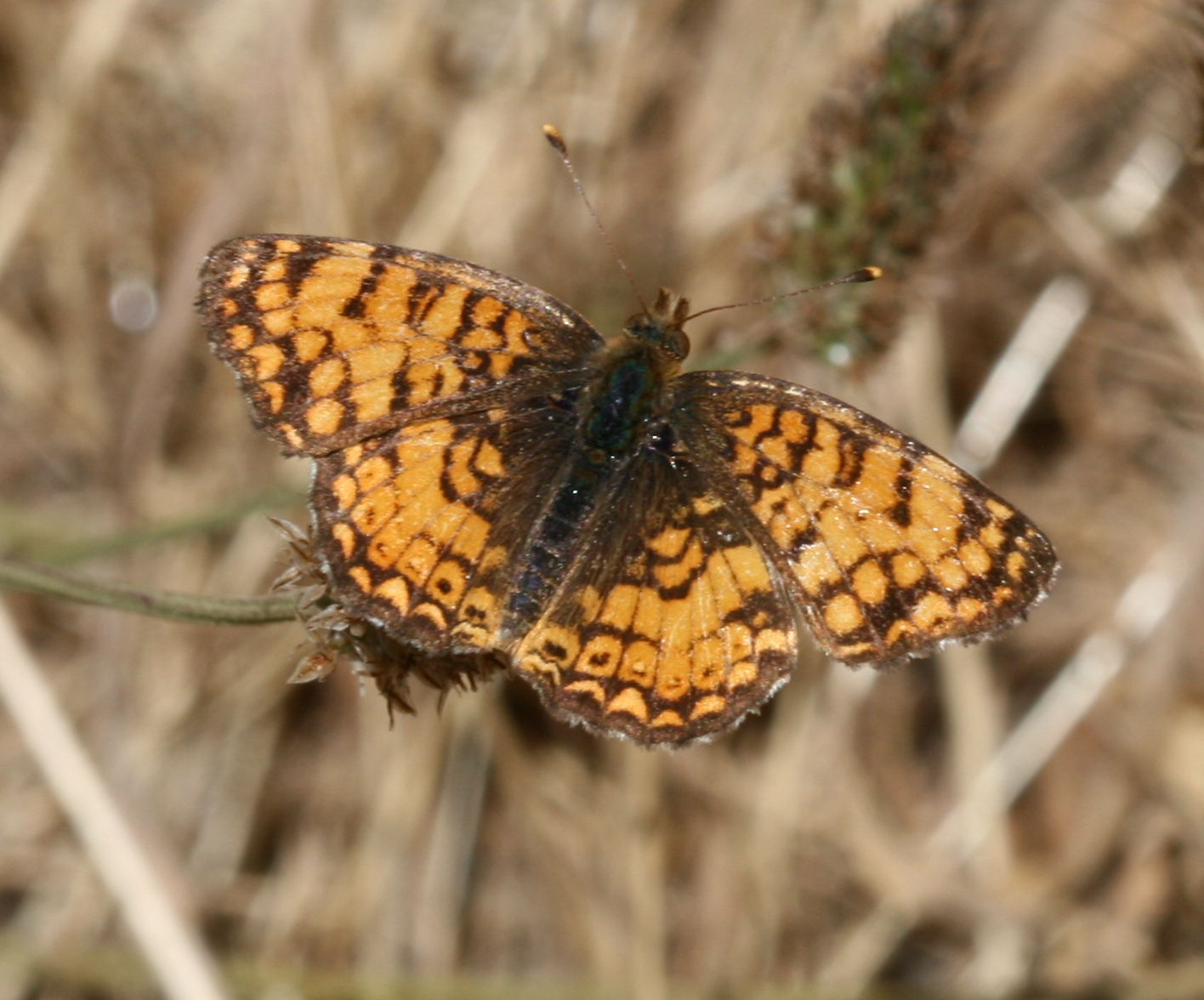

Scientific classification
- Domain: Eukaryota
- Kingdom: Animalia
- Phylum: Arthropoda
- Class: Insecta
- Order: Lepidoptera
- Family: Nymphalidae
- Genus: Phyciodes
- Species: P. mylitta

Binomial name
- Phyciodes mylitta (W.H. Edwards, 1861)

Synonyms
- Melitaea mylitta Edwards, 1861; Eresia mata Reakirt, 1866; Phyciodes mylittus Higgins, 1981; Phyciodes pallidus

= Phyciodes mylitta =

Mylitta crescent

Species of butterfly

Phyciodes mylitta, the Mylitta crescent or Mylitta crescentspot, is a butterfly of the family Nymphalidae. It is found in western North America.

The wingspan is 26–37 mm. Wings are orange with black markings and white fringe on the edges. The females are darker than the males. The butterfly flies from June until late July in Canada and until fall in California. It is found in a variety of habitats, and usually inhabits meadows and stream banks in forested areas.

The larvae are black with spines and white markings. They feed on Cirsium and Carduus species. Adults feed on flower nectar.

== Subspecies ==
Listed alphabetically:

- P. m. arizonensis Bauer, 1975
- P. m. arida (Skinner, 1917)
- P. m. mexicana Hall, 1928
- P. m. mylitta
- P. m. thebais Godman & Salvin, 1878

== Similar species ==
- Phyciodes pallida – pale crescent
