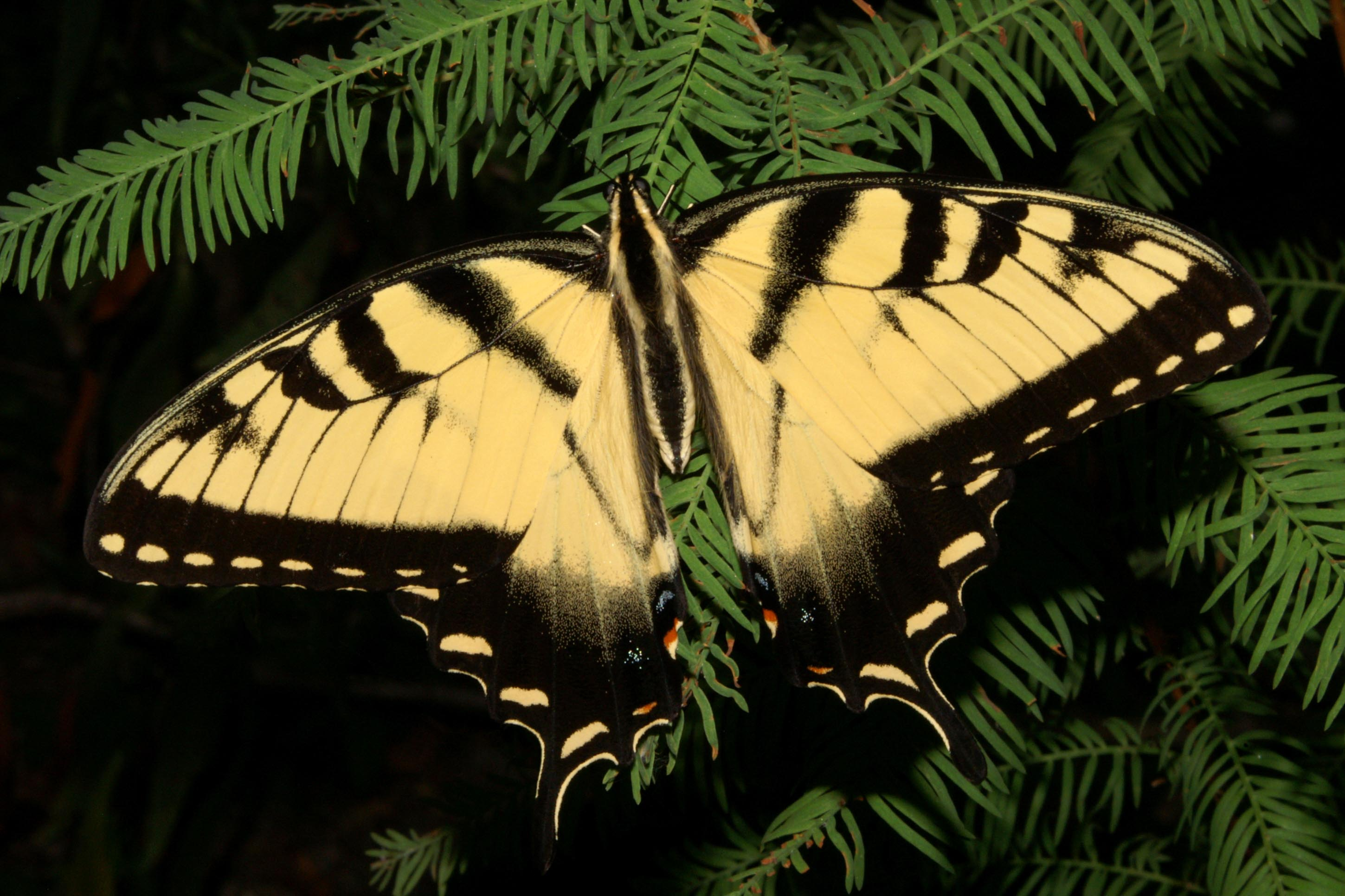
- Male
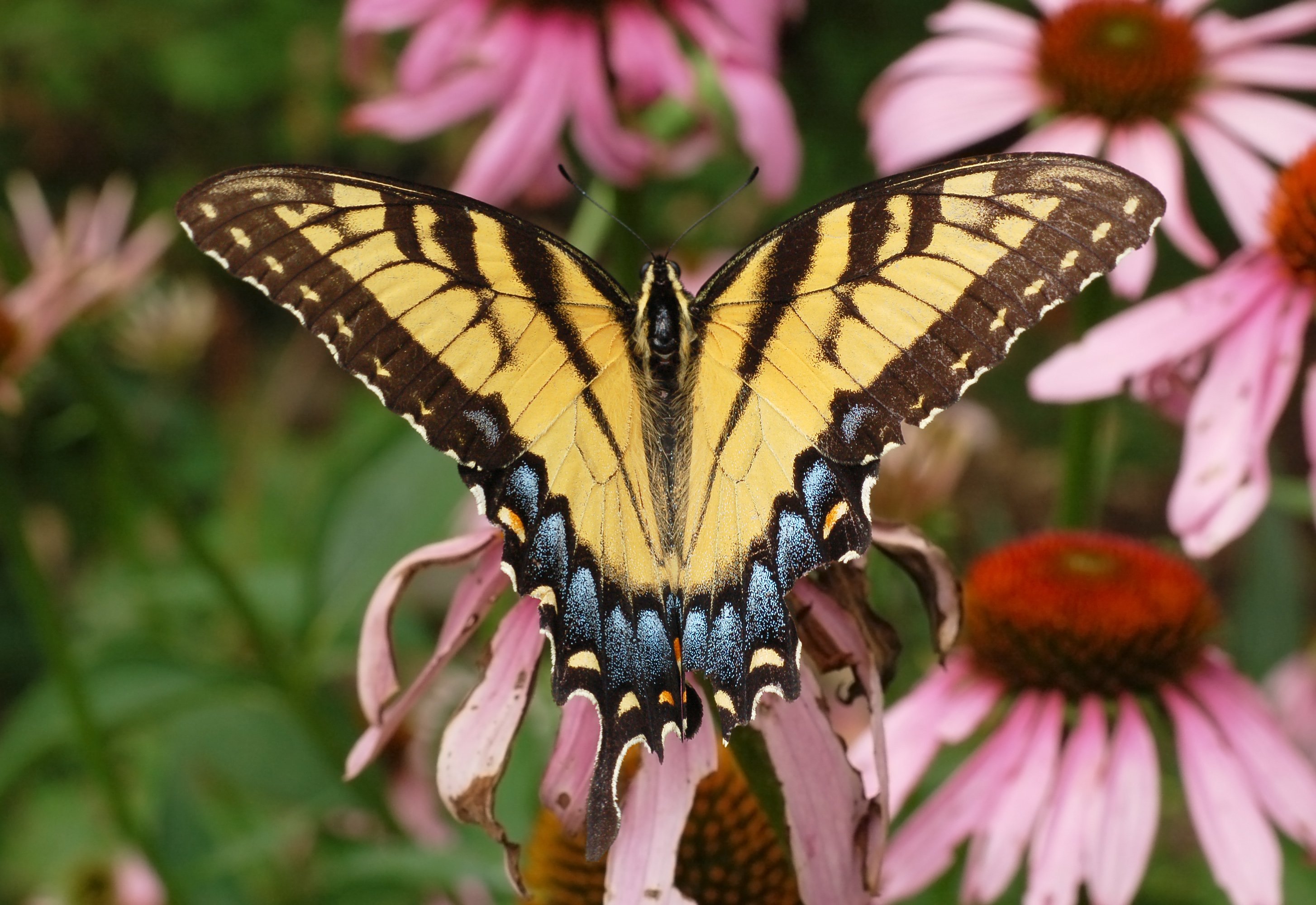
- Female

Conservation status
- Secure (NatureServe)

Scientific classification
- Kingdom: Animalia
- Phylum: Arthropoda
- Class: Insecta
- Order: Lepidoptera
- Family: Papilionidae
- Genus: Papilio
- Species: P. glaucus

Binomial name
- Papilio glaucus Linnaeus, 1758
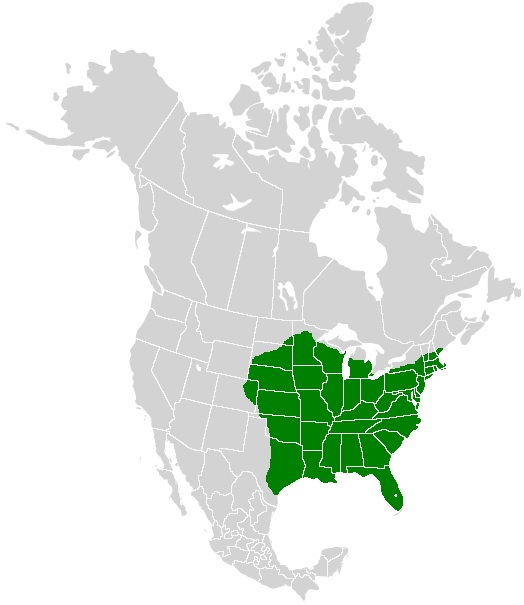

Synonyms
- Pterourus glaucus; Papilio turnus Linnaeus

= Papilio glaucus =

Eastern tiger swallowtail

Species of insect

Papilio glaucus, the eastern tiger swallowtail, is a species of butterfly native to eastern North America. It is one of the most familiar butterflies in the eastern United States, ranging north to southern Ontario, Canada, and is common in many different habitats. It flies from spring until fall, during which it produces two to three broods. Adults feed on the nectar of many species of flowers, mostly from those of the families Apocynaceae, Asteraceae, and Fabaceae. P. glaucus has a wingspan measuring 7.9 to 14 cm (3.1 to 5.5 in). The male is yellow with four black "tiger stripes" on each forewing. Females may be either yellow or black, making the females dimorphic. The yellow morph has similar coloring to the male, but with a conspicuous band of blue spots along the hindwing; the dark morph is almost completely black.

The green eggs are laid singly on plants of the families Magnoliaceae and Rosaceae. Young caterpillars are brown and white; older ones are green with two black, yellow, and blue eyespots on the thorax. The caterpillar will turn brown prior to pupating. It will reach a length of 5.5 centimetres (2.2 in). The chrysalis varies from a whitish color to dark brown. Hibernation occurs in this stage in locations with cold winter months.

The eastern tiger swallowtail is the state butterfly of Alabama (as well as state mascot), Delaware, Georgia, North Carolina and South Carolina, and is the state insect of Virginia.

== Description ==
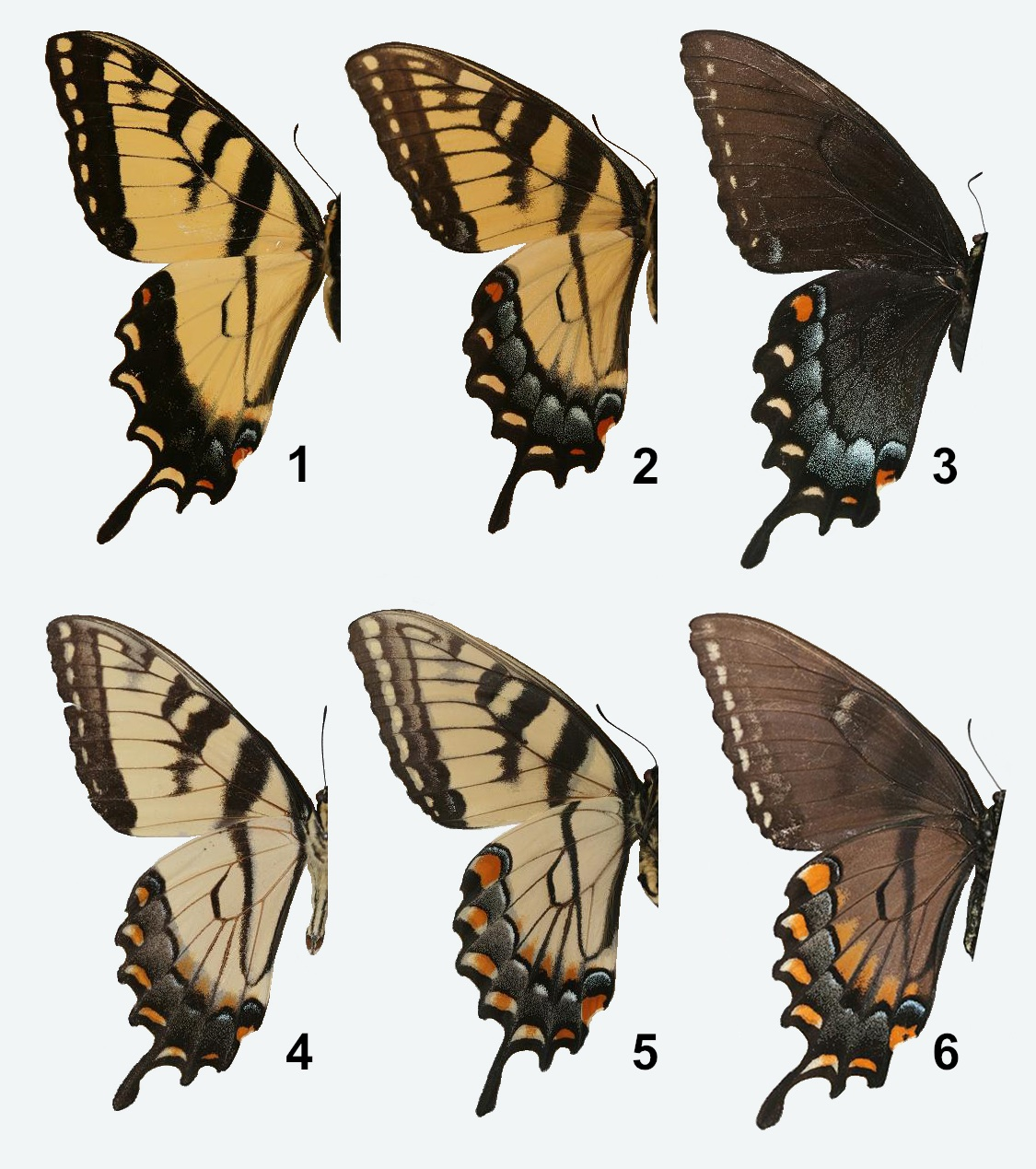
Dorsal and ventral sides. 1. dorsal male; 2. dorsal female; 3. dorsal female (dark morph); 4. ventral male; 5. ventral female; 6. ventral female (dark morph)

The wingspan ranges from 7.9 to 14 cm (3.1 to 5.5 in) with females being the larger sex. Southern individuals are larger than northern ones. Males are yellow with four black "tiger stripes" on each forewing. The outer edge of the forewing is black with a row of yellow spots. The veins are marked with black. The postmedian area of the hindwing is black with yellow spots along the margin. The inner margin of the hindwing has small red and blue spots. The ventral forewing margin has a yellow bar that is broken into spots. This broken bar is present in both sexes, and is used to distinguish P. glaucus from its close relatives.

Females are dimorphic. The yellow morph differs from the male in having a blue postmedian area on the dorsal hindwing. In the dark morph, the areas that are normally yellow are replaced with dark gray or black. The bluish postmedian area on the ventral hindwing has one row of orange spots. A shadow of the "tiger stripes" can be seen on the underside of some dark females.

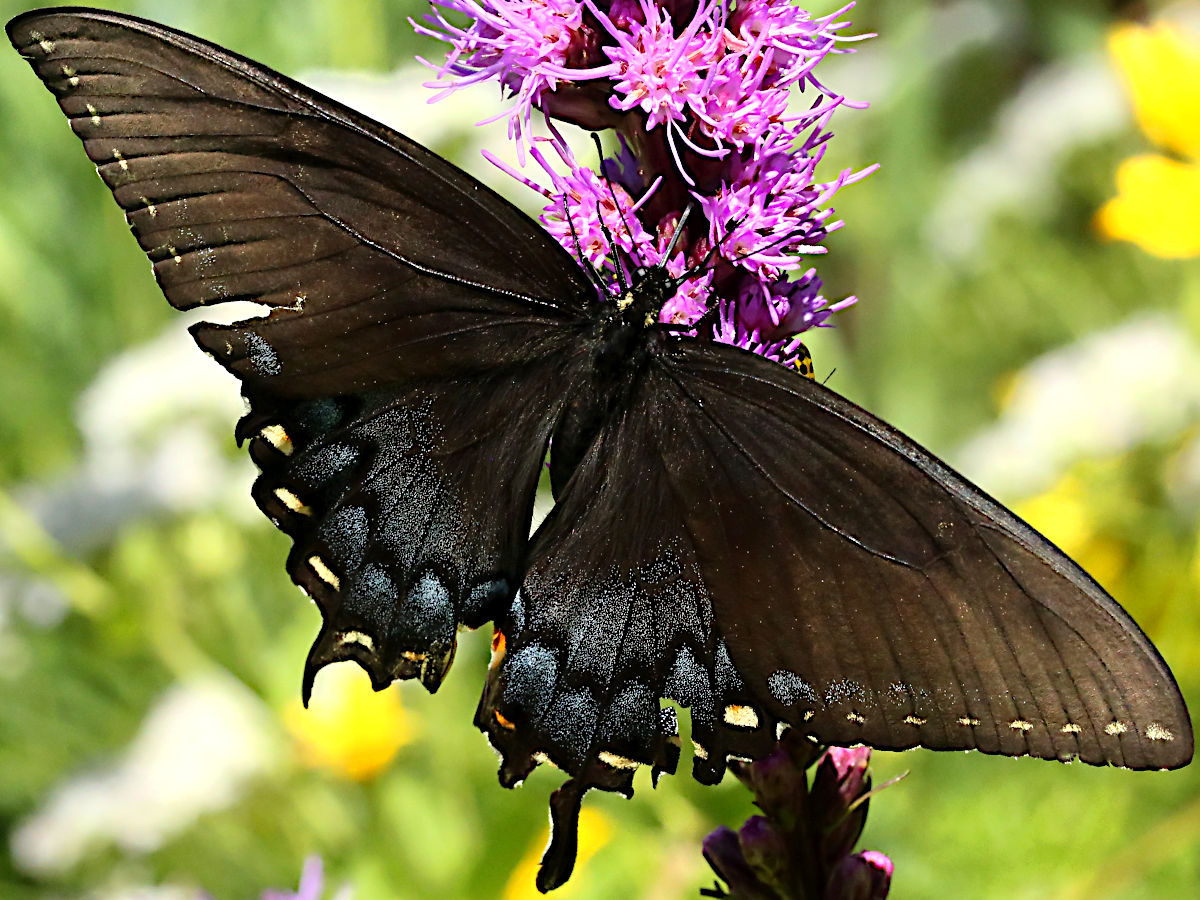
Female dark morph upperside

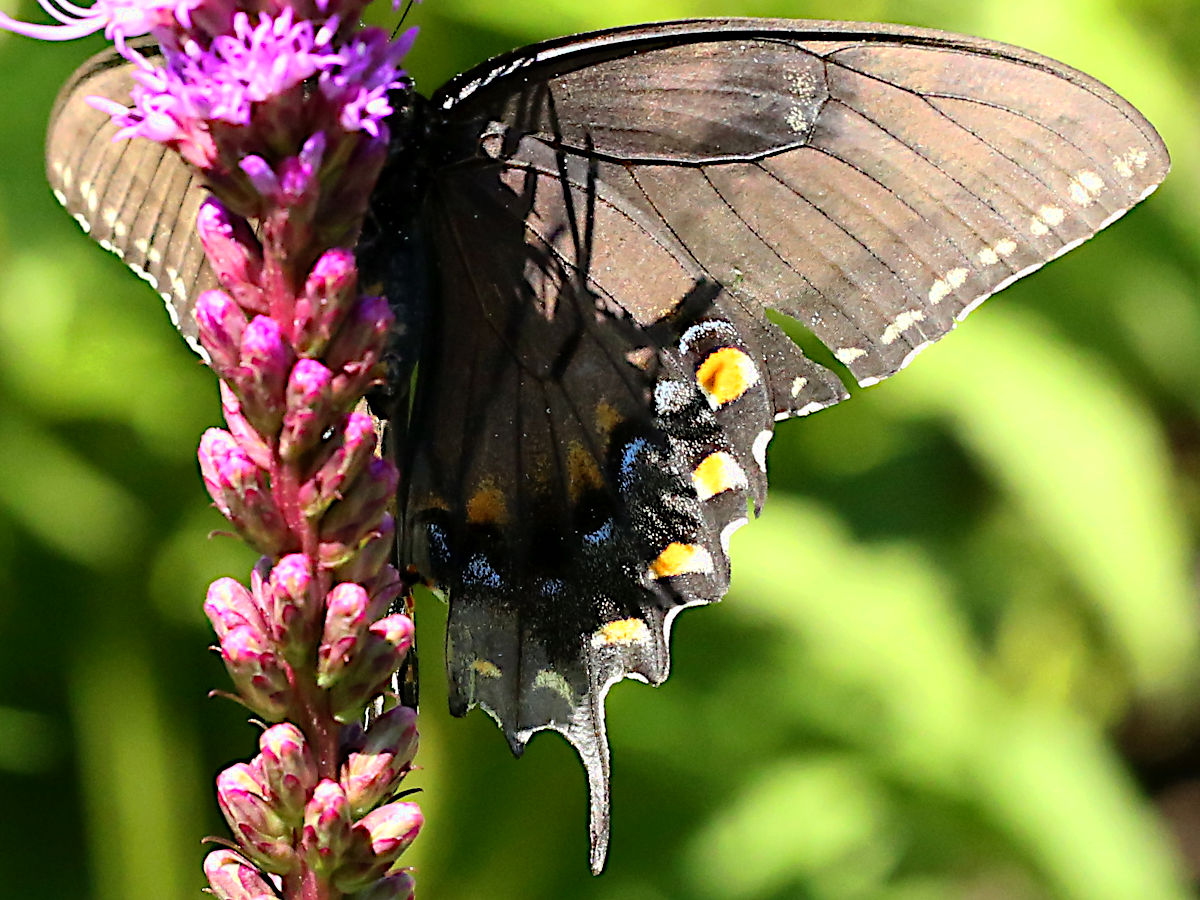
Female dark morph underside

P. glaucus is one of a few species of papilionids known to produce gynandromorphs. Most bilateral gynandromorphs are hybrids of P. glaucus and P. canadensis that are found along hybrid zones. Color mosaics are found in the central part of the species range.

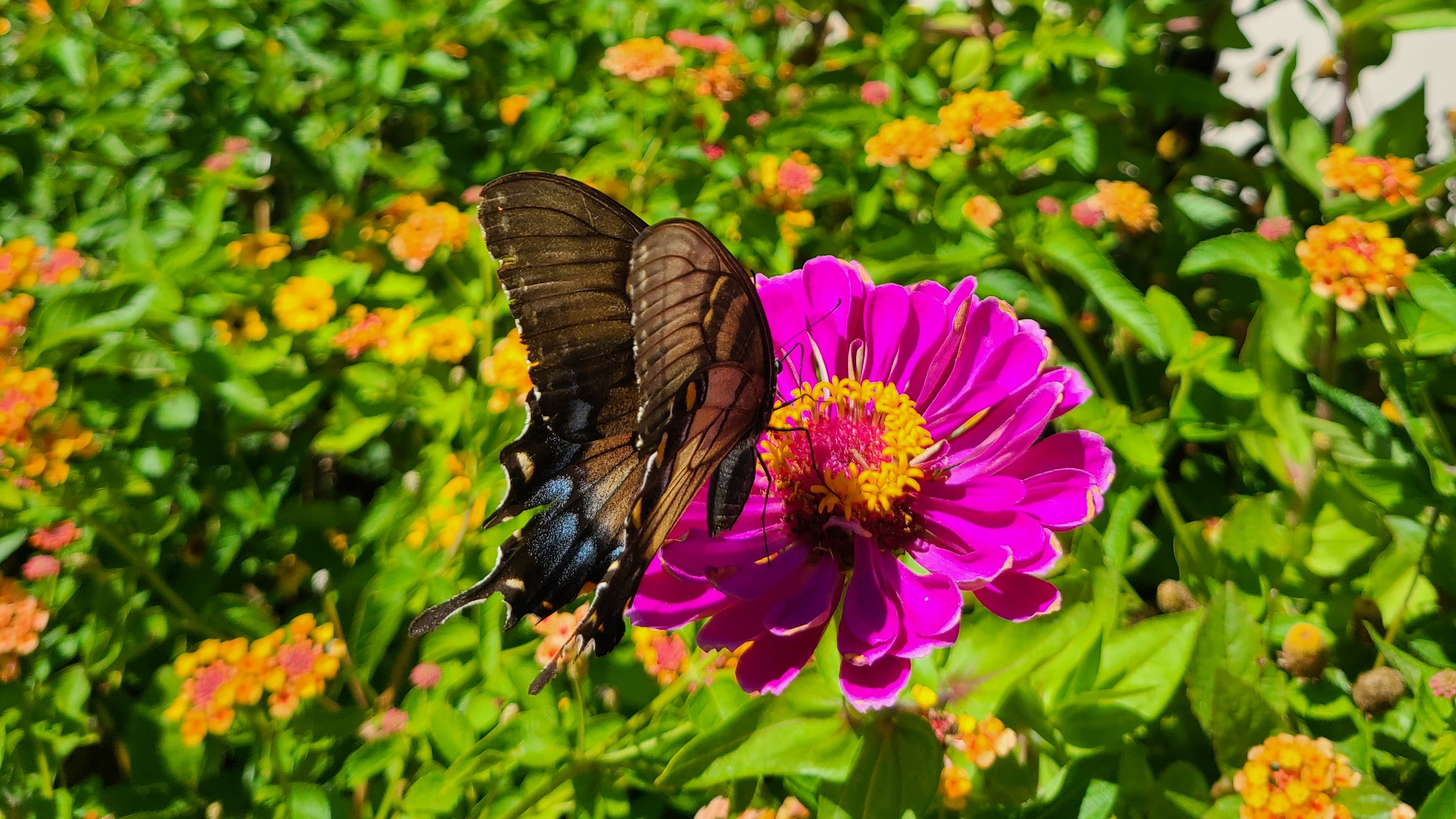
Eastern Tiger Swallowtail at the State Botanical Garden of Georgia

== Taxonomy ==
The first known drawing of a North American butterfly was of an eastern tiger swallowtail. It was drawn by John White in 1587, during Sir Walter Raleigh's third expedition to Virginia. White named his drawing "Mamankanois" which is believed to be a Carolina Algonquian word for "butterfly". This species was later described by Carl Linnaeus in his 10th edition of Systema Naturae in 1758. Some taxonomists place P. glaucus, along with the other tiger swallowtails, in the genus Pterourus.

The eastern tiger swallowtail was formerly considered a single species with a vast range into northern Canada and the eastern United States. In 1991, the subspecies Papilio glaucus canadensis was elevated to species level, thus reducing the range of P. glaucus to south of Canada. In 2002, another closely related species, P. appalachiensis, was described by H. Pavulaan and D. M. Wright from the southern Appalachian Mountains. These two species can be separated from P. glaucus by size; P. canadensis is smaller and P. appalachiensis is larger. These two also have a solid yellow bar along the margin of the ventral forewing. P. canadensis females are not dimorphic, and P. appalachiensis females are rarely black.

Similar species for the dark P. glaucus female include the pipevine swallowtail (Battus philenor), the spicebush swallowtail (Papilio troilus), and the female black swallowtail (Papilio polyxenes). B. philenor differs from the dark morph P. glaucus by the row of light-colored spots on each wing margin. P. troilus is more greenish, and has two rows of orange spots on the ventral hindwing. P. polyxenes is smaller, and the ventral hindwing has two rows of yellow-orange spots.

== Distribution and habitat ==
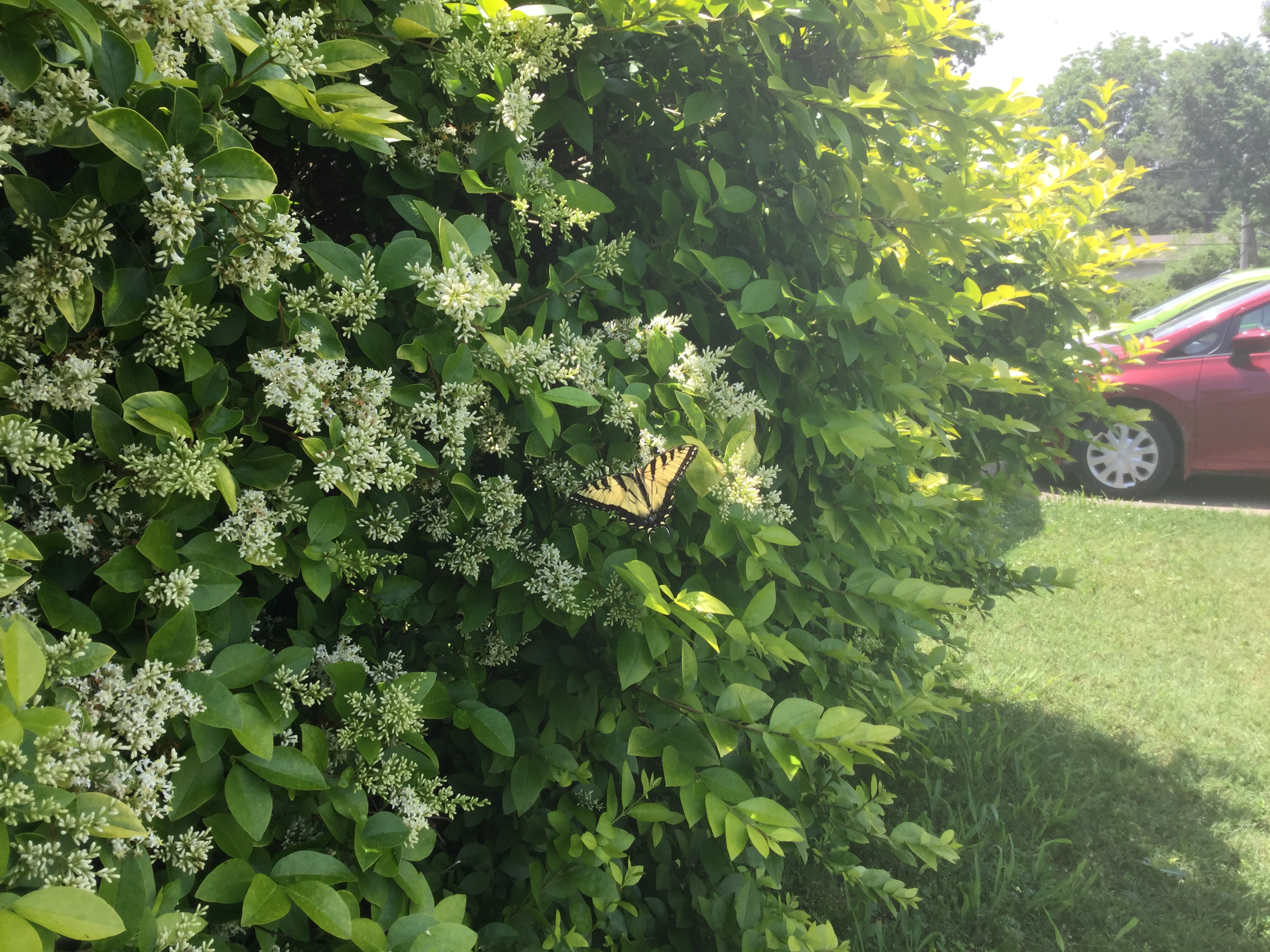
Specimen on a flowering bush in Eastern Oklahoma

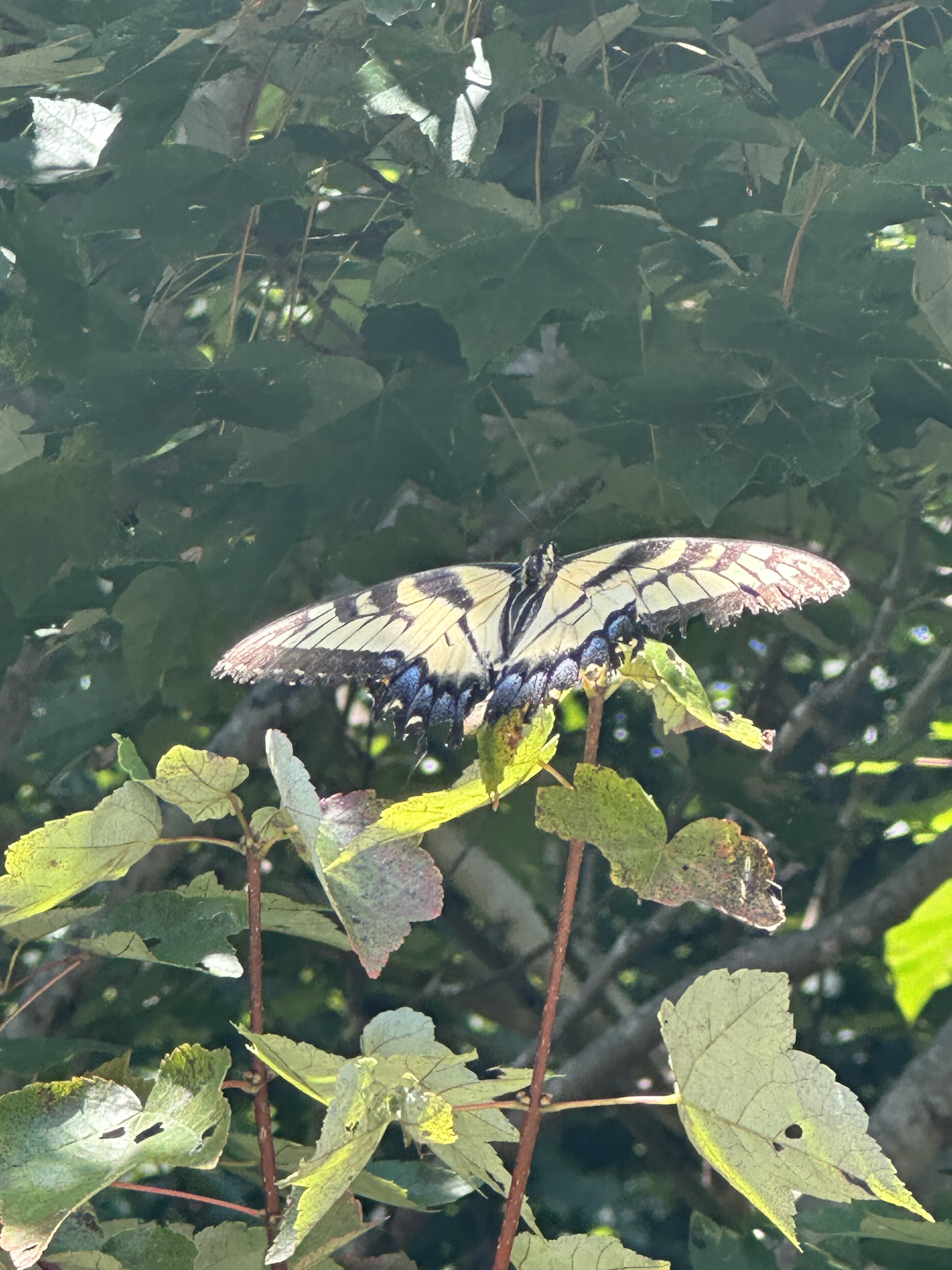
An eastern tiger swallowtail butterfly in the leaves of a tree.

P. glaucus is found in the eastern United States from southern Vermont to Florida west to eastern Texas and the Great Plains. It is common throughout its range, although is rarer in southern Florida and absent from the Florida Keys. In 1932, a single specimen was collected in County Wicklow, Ireland. It is believed to have been an accidental introduction from North America.

P. glaucus can be found almost anywhere deciduous forests occur. Common habitats include woodlands, fields, rivers, creeks, roadsides, and gardens. It will stray into urban parks and city yards. Because it has adapted to many different habitats and host plants, P. glaucus is a generalist, and is not considered threatened. Papilio glaucus is considered to be one of the most polyphagous of all swallowtail species. This is likely due to genetic traits and differential detoxification abilities. However, as compared to Papilio canadensis, at the northern overlap between the two species, P. glaucus survive very poorly through their first larval instar when settling on a quaking aspen (Populus tremeloides) tree and their survival rate under those conditions are approximately 15%, whereas P. canadensis thrives on this food plant.

Adults are seen from spring to fall, although the exact date varies depending on the location. In the south, they are seen from February to November; in the north, they are seen from May to September. P. glaucus produces two broods in the north and three in the south. The first broods yield the smallest adults.

== Behavior ==
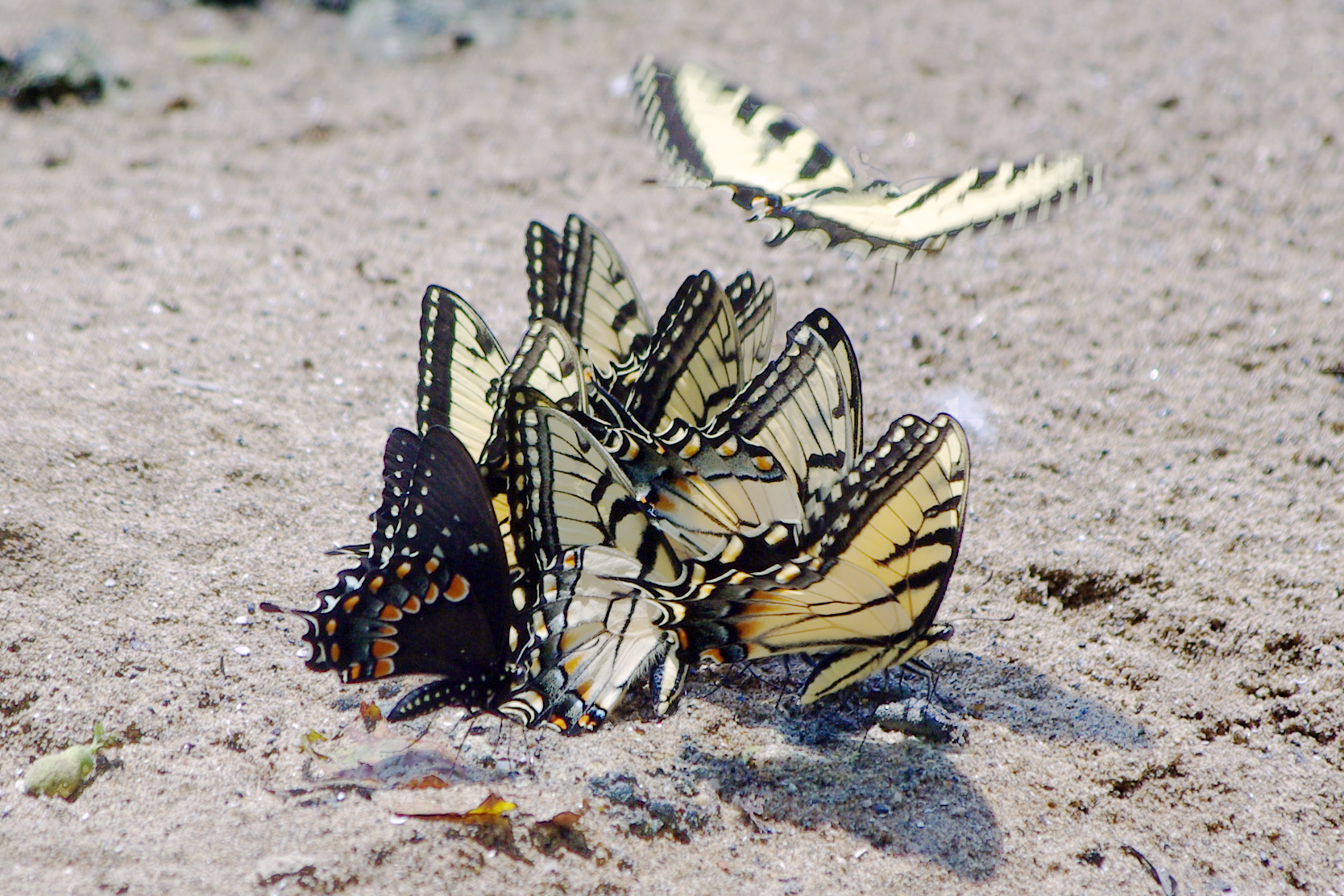
Group of male eastern tiger swallowtails puddling, including a male eastern black swallowtail

Eastern tiger swallowtails are diurnal, and are usually solitary. Adults are known to fly high above the ground, usually seen above the tree canopy. Males seek females by patrolling habitats containing the larval host plants. During courtship, the male and female fly about each other prior to landing and mating. The male releases perfume-like pheromones during courtship to entice the female into mating.

Adults use a wide range of food sources, most preferring to nectar on sturdy plants with red or pink flowers. Many members of the families Apocynaceae, Asteraceae and Fabaceae are used as common nectar sources. Males participate in a behavior called puddling, in which they congregate on mud, damp gravel or puddles. They extract sodium ions and amino acids from these sources which aid in reproduction. Males that puddle are typically fresh, and puddle only for their first couple of days. Females will occasionally puddle, but do not form congregations. Adults have also been seen feeding on dung, carrion, and urine.

The eastern tiger swallowtail, Papilio glaucus, is probably the most polyphagous of all 560+ species of swallowtail butterflies in the world.

== Life cycle ==
The butterfly may have one or two generations in the north, while southern areas may have three. Time duration for various stages is as follows:

- Egg - It takes three to five days for eggs to hatch.
- Larva - The caterpillar has five instars.
- Pupa - The chrysalis stage lasts nine to eleven days, or over winter hibernation.

=== Egg ===
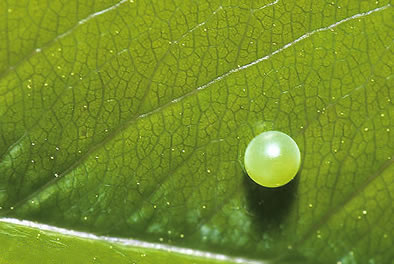
Egg

Females lay their eggs singly on the host plant leaves, preferring to oviposit on host plants near nectar sources. The egg is round and green, later turning yellowish green with reddish dots. The size of the egg is large for a butterfly, being 0.8 millimeters (0.03 in) in height and 1.2 millimeters (0.05 in) in width. It takes between 4 and 10 days to hatch.

=== Caterpillar ===
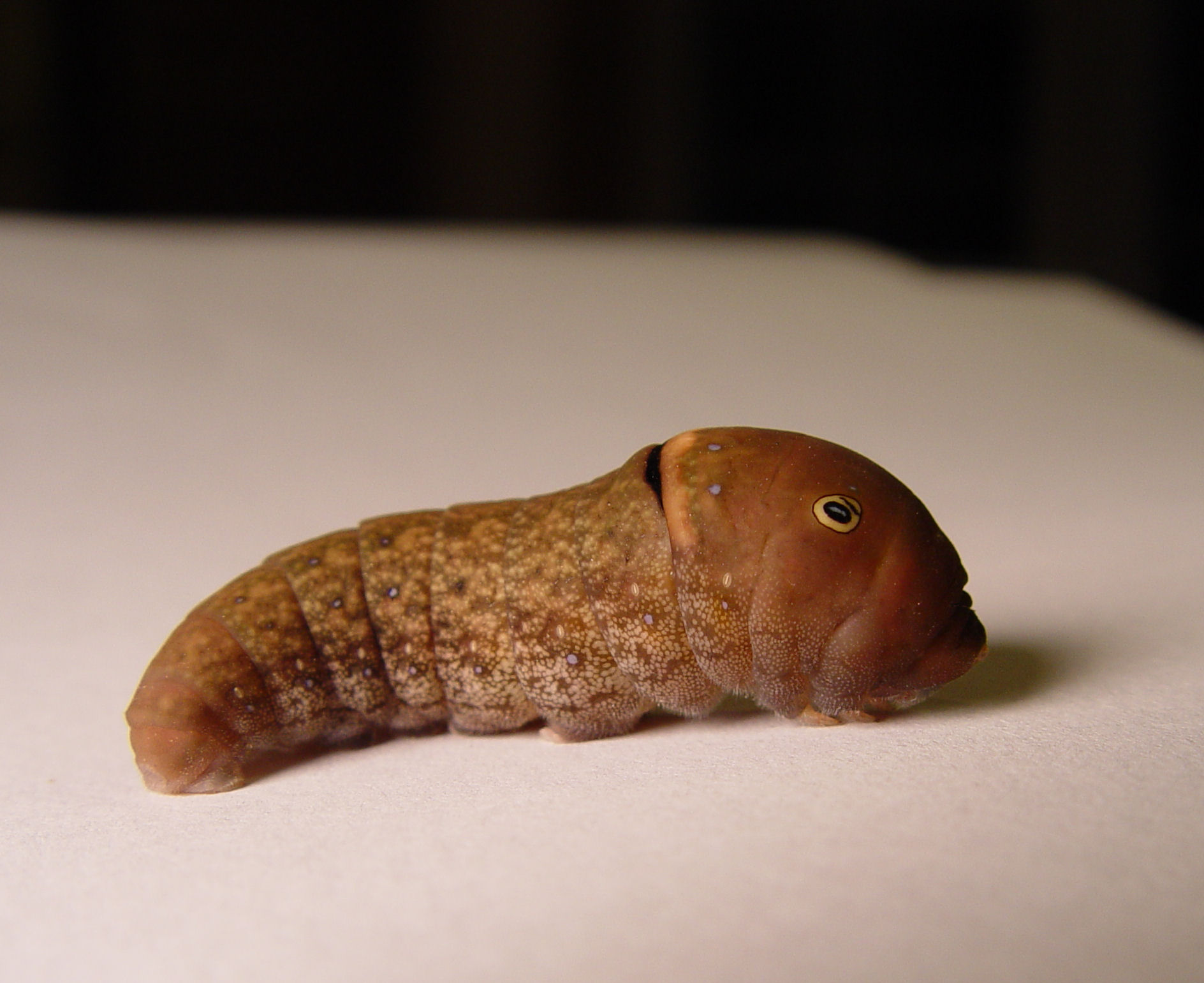
Fifth instar caterpillar, shortly before pupating

The caterpillar eats the leaves of the host plant. It will rest on a silk pad on a leaf, with the edges of the leaf folded over itself and held together with silk. The first three instars are brown. A large white spot, known as a saddle, is found on the abdomen. After molting to the fourth instar, the caterpillar becomes green. The swollen thorax has two black, yellow, and blue eyespots. These eyespots are much smaller than those of the similar-looking spicebush swallowtail caterpillar. A yellow and black transverse stripe is present between the first and second abdominal segments. It is concealed between the folds of the segments when the caterpillar is at rest. The abdomen is spotted transversely with light blue. Before pupating, the caterpillar will turn dark brown. It will reach a length of 5.5 centimetres (2.2 in). The caterpillar of P. glaucus is impossible to distinguish from the caterpillars of P. canadensis and P. appalachiensis.

=== Chrysalis ===
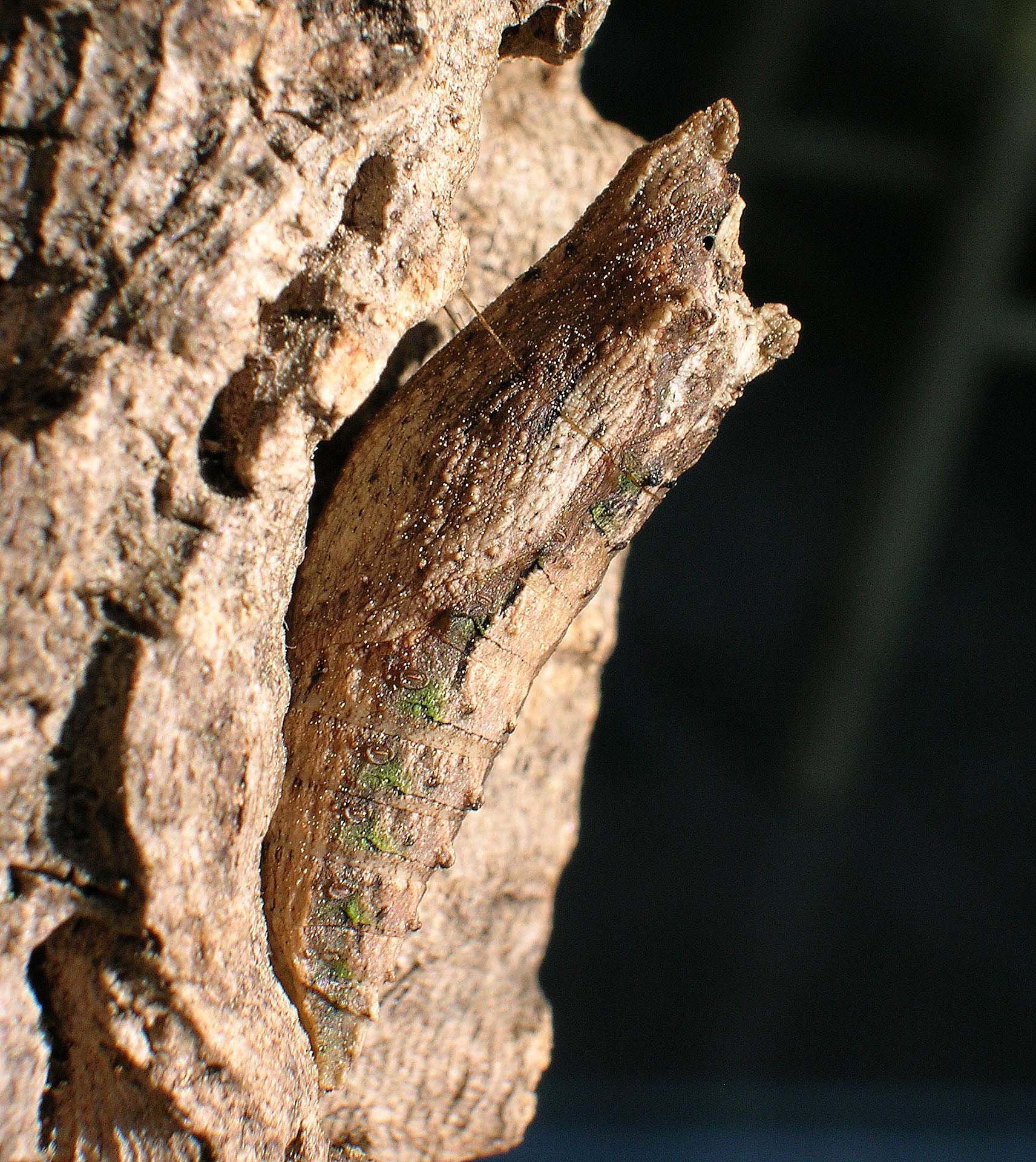
A light colored chrysalis

The chrysalis measures 3.2 centimetres (1.3 in). It hangs from a surface by a silk girdle around the thorax and a silk pad at the base. The chrysalis varies in color, ranging from off white to dark brown. It is often spotted with green and dark brown. Lighter-colored chrysalids often have a dark lateral stripe along each side of the body. Two horn-like projections are present on the head; one is found on the thorax. P. glaucus chrysalids can be found in a variety of places, but are commonly found on tree trunks, fence posts, and in ground litter. It hibernates in locations with cold winters.

=== Host plants ===
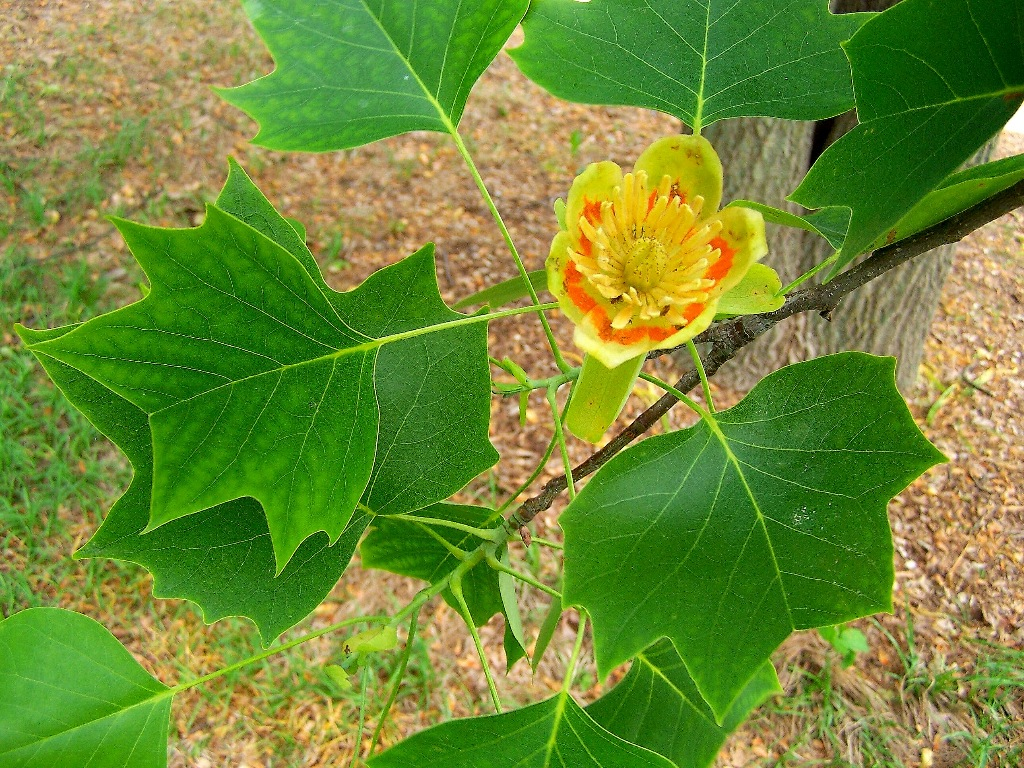
Leaves of Liriodendron tulipifera, one of many host plants for P. glaucus

The caterpillar feeds on host plants of many different families. Common host plants used are those of the families Magnoliaceae and Rosaceae, with species including tulip tree (Liriodendron tulipifera), sweet bay magnolia (Magnolia virginiana) and wild black cherry (Prunus serotina). It also feeds on other members of the family Rosaceae, as well as members from the families Lauraceae, Oleaceae, Rutaceae, and Tilioideae. Aspens (Populus sect. Populus), birches (Betula), and willows (Salix) have been recorded in older literature as host plants, but these are used by P. canadensis. Host plants of P. glaucus include:

- Wild black cherry (Prunus serotina)
- Ash (Fraxinus species)
- Cottonwood (Populus species)
- Wafer ash or hoptree (Ptelea trifoliata)
- Common lilac (Syringa vulgaris)
- Sweet bay magnolia (Magnolia virginiana)
- Tulip poplar or tulip tree (Liriodendron tulipifera)
- Willow (Salix species)

== Defense against predators ==
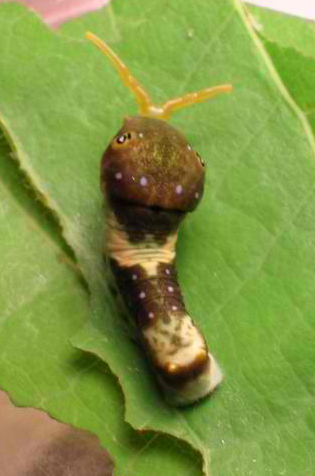
Caterpillar with an everted osmeterium

The first three instars of the caterpillar are bird dropping mimics, coloration that helps protect it from predators. In later instars, the eyespots on the thorax serve to deter birds. Like all members of the family Papilionidae, the caterpillar of P. glaucus possesses an osmeterium, an orange, fleshy organ that emits foul-smelling terpenes to repel predators. Normally hidden, the osmeterium is located on the first segment of the thorax, and can be everted when the caterpillar feels threatened. The combination of eyespots and osmeterium makes the caterpillar resemble a snake.

Since adults are palatable, dark morph females use Batesian mimicry to protect themselves from vertebrate predators by mimicking the poisonous pipevine swallowtail. Dark morph females are more prevalent in the south, where B. philenor is more common.

== See also ==
- Two-tailed swallowtail
- Western tiger swallowtail
- Canadian tiger swallowtail
