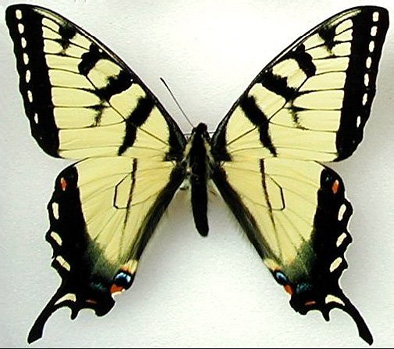
- Male holotype

Conservation status
- Apparently Secure (NatureServe)

Scientific classification
- Kingdom: Animalia
- Phylum: Arthropoda
- Class: Insecta
- Order: Lepidoptera
- Family: Papilionidae
- Genus: Papilio
- Species: P. appalachiensis

Binomial name
- Papilio appalachiensis (Pavulaan & D. Wright, 2002)

Synonyms
- Pterourus appalachiensis Pavulaan & Wright, 2002

= Papilio appalachiensis =

Species of butterfly

Papilio appalachiensis, the Appalachian tiger swallowtail, is a species of swallowtail butterfly found in eastern North America, particularly in the Appalachian Mountains. It is a hybrid of another two Papilio species, Papilio canadensis and Papilio glaucus, with which it shares many characteristics. The butterflies are normally yellow and contain black patterns in their wings. Their wingspans range from 86 to 115 mm. The caterpillars range in color from green and yellow to orange and are ornamented with black specks that give them the appearance of a bird dropping, which is useful for camouflage, or a large eye, a form of mimicry that is also efficient for protection. This species is univoltine. Females lay their eggs in May.

== Taxonomy ==
Papilio appalachiensis is a member of the genus Papilio in the order Lepidoptera. It is closely related to Papilio canadensis and Papilio glaucus.

== Distribution ==
The butterfly is found in the eastern United States, specifically in the Appalachian Mountains, ranging from Pennsylvania to Georgia. It is notably larger than both the eastern tiger swallowtail and the Canadian tiger swallowtail.

== Evolution ==
P. appalachiensis is thought to have evolved as a hybrid species of two other Papilio butterflies: P. canadensis and P. glaucus. Originally, researchers believed that P. canadensis and P. glaucus were distributed in distinct regions separated by a hybrid zone stretching east from Minnesota to southern New England and south along the Appalachian Mountains. In 2005, researchers suggested these two species interacted at some point and produced the new hybrid P. appalachiensis in the hybrid zone.

Although each species of tiger swallowtail butterflies is usually confined to a specific "thermal landscape", based on specific X-linked markers and various behavioral traits, laboratory and observational studies have shown the hybrid Appalachian tiger swallowtail butterflies have emerged. Data collected about oviposition preferences and larval mortality rates further suggest hybridization between P. canadensis and P. glaucus. Due to shifting thermal landscapes, the ranges of both P. glaucus and P. canadensis have moved dramatically enough to overlay, leading to crossbreeding that has resulted in P. appalachiensis.

Although hybrid speciation is often difficult to achieve, given the difficulty of finding a habitat separate from either parental species (competitive exclusion) and remaining genetically distinct from the parental species (reproductive isolation), P. appalachiensis accomplishes this by living in a separate habitat: a higher elevation in the Appalachian Mountains.

== Appearance ==
P. appalachiensis and its hybrid parents

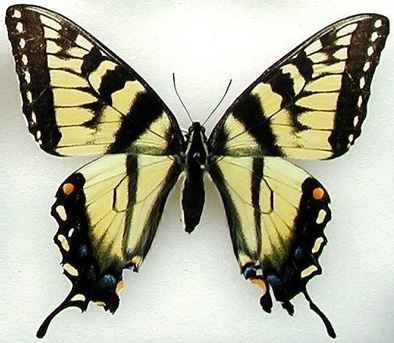
P. appalachiensis

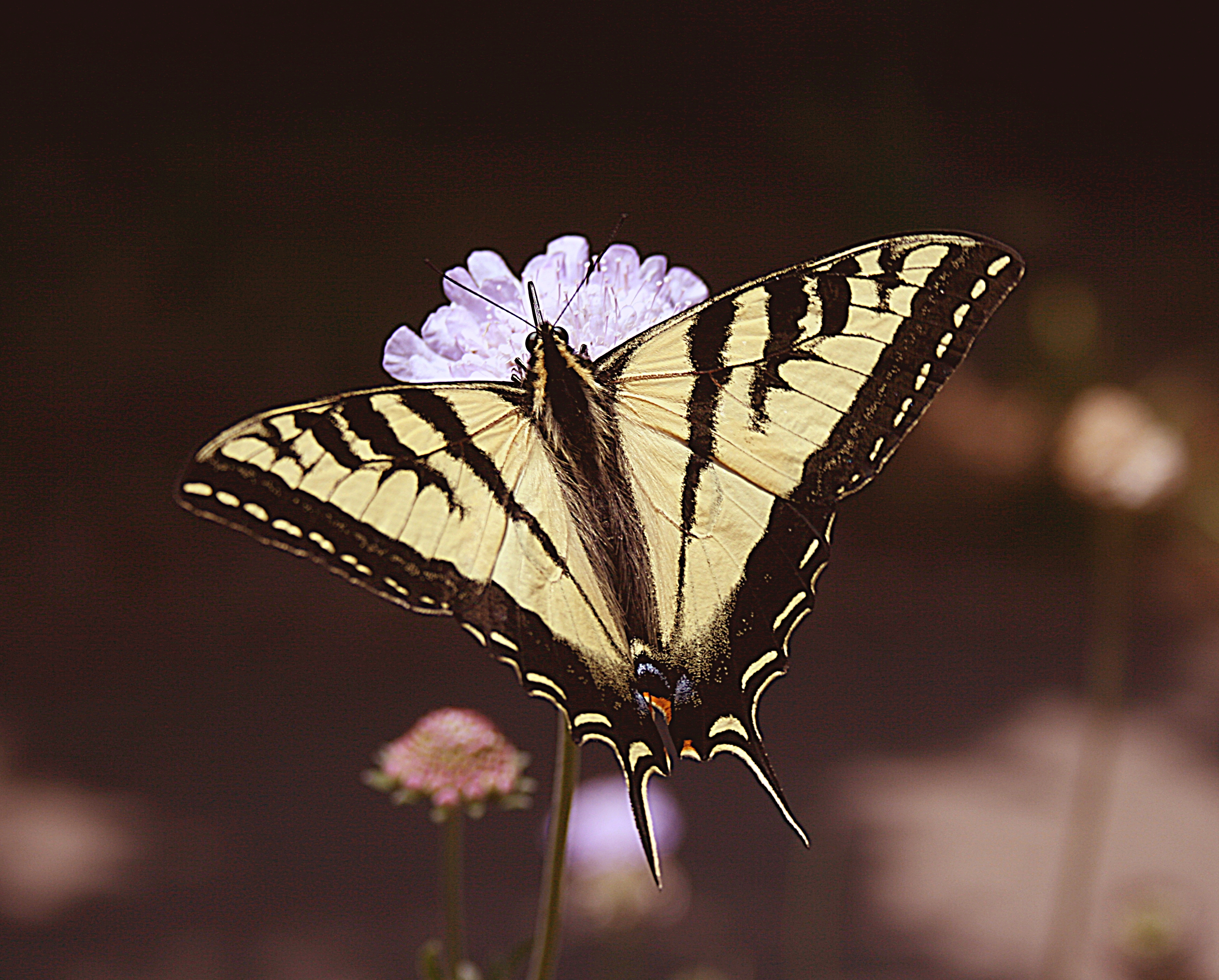
P. canadensis

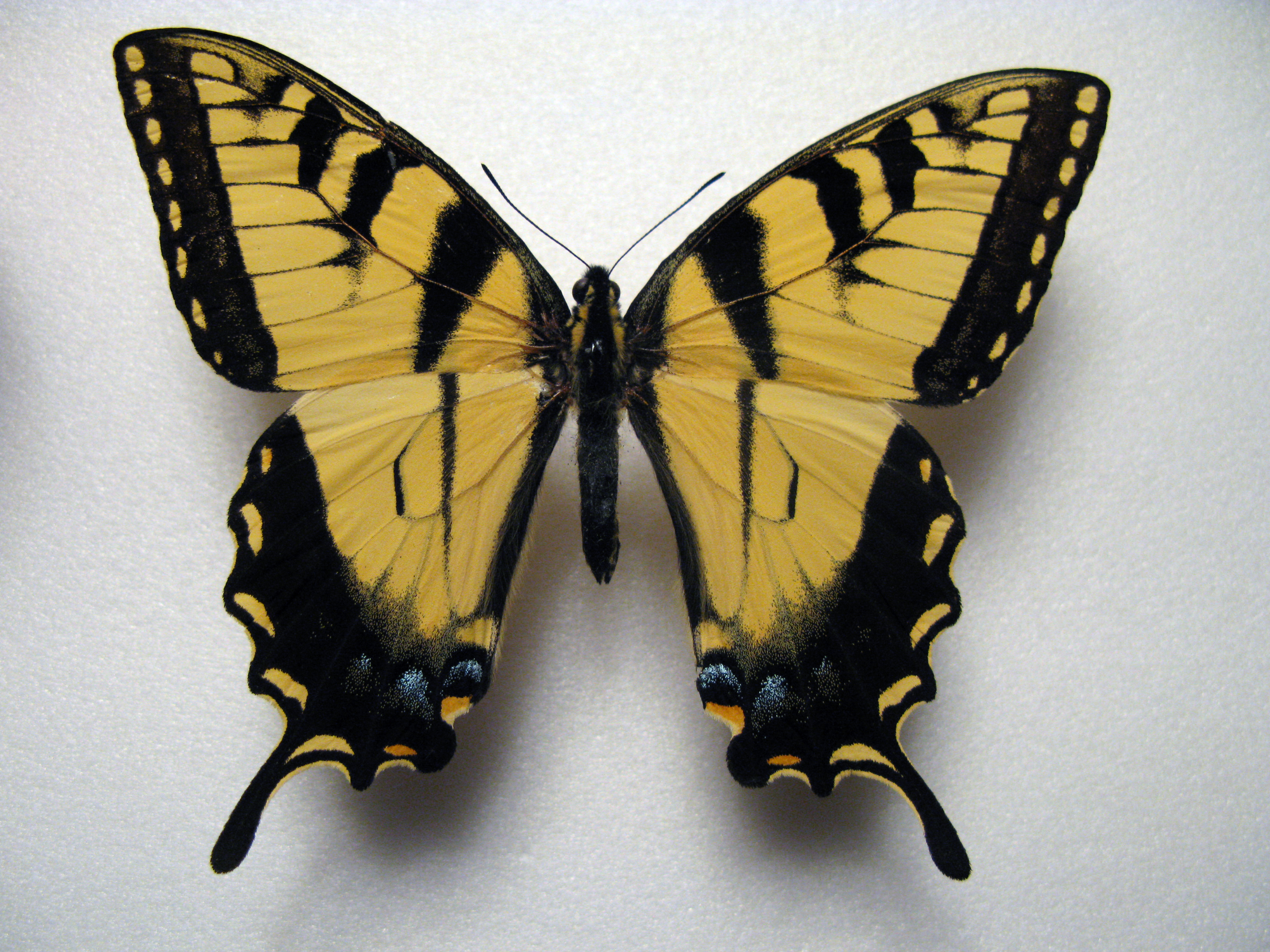
P. glaucus

The Appalachian tiger swallowtail has similarities to both parent species; it resembles P. canadensis as it is adapted to a cooler temperature and has only one brood per year (univoltine), but also resembles P. glaucus as it displays sex-limited polymorphism with the dark female morph displaying mimicry. However, research has shown that P. appalachiensis may be more closely related genetically to P. canadensis than to P. glaucus.

Females of P. appalachiensis are generally larger than those of P. glaucus. Their wings are slightly angular and have vertical black stripes that are narrower than those on P. glaucus. The hindwing scallops are also less curved and more angular than those of P. glaucus. Additionally, the spots on their hindwings are also less crescent shaped and rectangular compared to those of P. glaucus. Males' hindwings tend to be more triangular.

The female has two forms: yellow and black. Both the yellow and black forms have a slight blue tint on the topside of the hindwings that is significantly reduced from the stronger blue tint on those of the tiger swallowtails. On the topside of the hindwing, there is a large orange spot. Their wingspan is 86–115 mm (3.4–4.5 in). Initially, no black forms of P. appalachiensis were thought to exist, but researchers found two black females on the summit of Spruce Knob in West Virginia.

=== Caterpillar ===
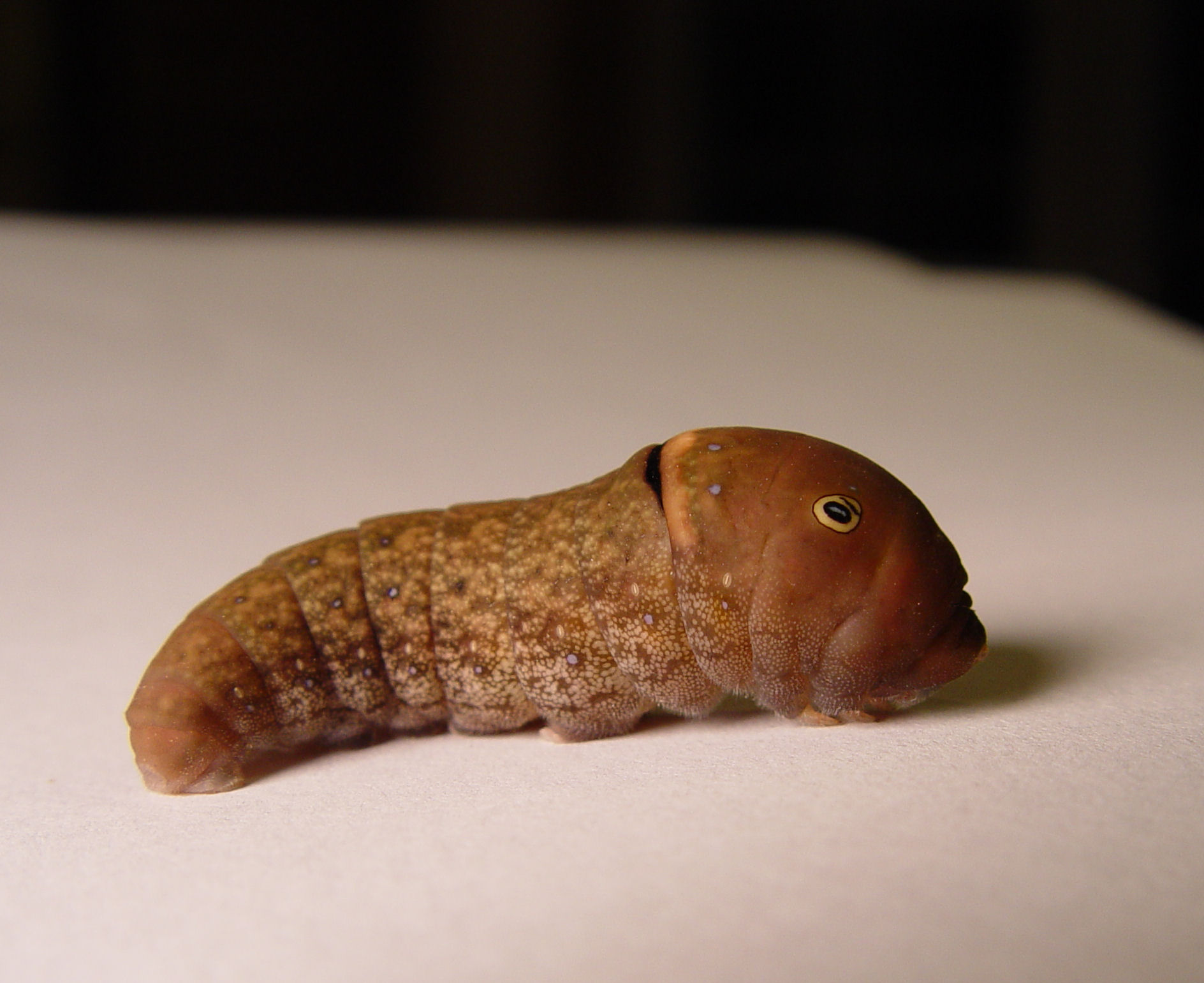
Caterpillar of the closely related species P. glaucus

The caterpillars of Papilio species are usually smooth and vary in color from green to yellow orange. In addition, they have black markings to mimic the appearance of bird droppings or the head of another bug with large "eyes". The eyespot consists of areas of yellow ringed with black with a smaller, light purple spot (also ringed in black) inside.

Additionally, a small black spot on top of the "eye" gives it the appearance of a true eye. This form of mimicry provides a natural defense mechanism against potential predators. In addition to their appearance, every caterpillar of the swallowtail family has an osmeterium, a special scent gland behind the head that, when disturbed, is everted from its pouch and releases a foul odor. The gland is orange red, fleshy, forked and generally intimidating to potential predators. The mimicry induced by the eyespots and forked gland give the caterpillar the appearance of a snake, adding to its defense mechanisms against potential predators. The caterpillar lives in a nest that it creates in the trees by folding a leaf over itself and pulling together the two halves with silk. By the time it is ready to undergo metamorphosis, the caterpillar can grow to be up to 5 cm (2 in) long. About a month is needed for the egg to develop into an adult. Fully-grown caterpillars tend to be green. After hatching, the caterpillar usually eats the egg shell.

The caterpillars have been known to eat from the black cherry.

== Ecology ==
=== Life cycle ===
The Appalachian tiger swallowtail is univoltine. Female butterflies usually lay their singular brood from May to June. During the mating season, the males fly through the treetops, scouting for females. Females, though, tend to be difficult to find because they prefer to hide in the forest canopy.

After mating, females lay their eggs singularly on host plant leaves. The caterpillars, after hatching, then eat the host plants' leaves and undergo chrysalis throughout the winter. Pupation occurs around late June to July and pupae diapause until spring. Adults hatch in May.

=== Habitat ===
Appalachian tiger swallowtail butterflies tend to congregate in the woodlands and woodland openings. They prefer to remain in mid-level to high elevations in the southern Appalachian Mountains, and the species' range stretches from Pennsylvania to Georgia and Alabama. This species is extremely prevalent at higher elevations, but can also be found at lower elevations or valleys within mountainous terrain. The adult butterflies tend to remain in the canopy of the Appalachian hardwood forest and mainly only leave when visiting flowers. Their habitats often parallel those of P. glaucus.

=== Nectar plants ===
Adults drink nectar from many plants, including the mountain laurel (Kalmia latifolia), the pink azalea (Rhododendron nudiflorum), the blackberry (Rubus), the cockspur thorn (Crataegus crus-galli), the multiflora rose (Rosa multiflora), and the bush honeysuckle (Diervilla). Near the summit, they also tend to drink from the autumn olive (Elaeagnus commutata), but at lower elevation, they drink from the daisy fleabane (Erigeron ramosus).

=== Host plants ===
The larvae eat the leaves of a wide variety of trees, including cottonwood, tulip tree, lemon and cherry.

=== Flight patterns ===
The Appalachian tiger swallowtail shares a delayed flight pattern and many other hybrid-like traits with P. glaucus and P. canadensis despite its genetic isolation. Its flight period is in May. Some individuals take flight during late June, while others fly from May to early June. Populations of this species make annual migrations of over 200 km (120 mi). Papilio appalachiensis usually has a singular flight period from spring to early summer and emerges later than P. glaucus. The Appalachian tiger swallowtail tends to fly directly up the western side of Spruce Knob towards the summit against strong westerly winds. The summit contains substantial vegetation within protected nooks where the adult butterflies rest and obtain nectar from various plants.
