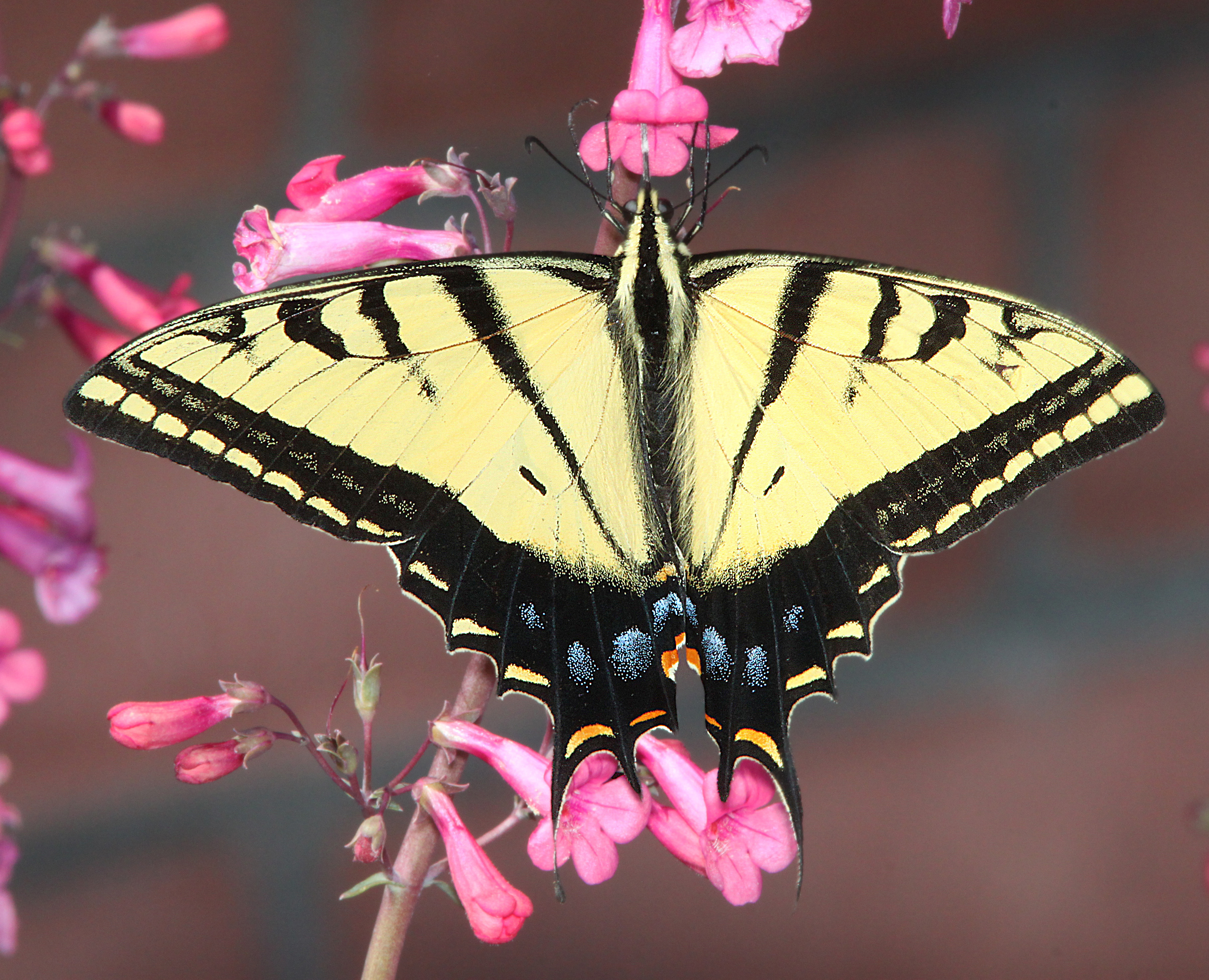

Conservation status
- Least Concern (IUCN 3.1)

- Secure (NatureServe)

Scientific classification
- Kingdom: Animalia
- Phylum: Arthropoda
- Class: Insecta
- Order: Lepidoptera
- Family: Papilionidae
- Genus: Papilio
- Species: P. multicaudata

Binomial name
- Papilio multicaudata W.F. Kirby, 1884

Subspecies
- Three, see text

Synonyms
- Papilio multicaudatus

= Papilio multicaudata =

Two-tailed swallowtail

Species of butterfly

Papilio multicaudata, the two-tailed swallowtail, is a species of the family Papilionidae found in western North America from British Columbia to Central America.

== Description ==
The two-tailed swallowtail is a large swallowtail of western North America, one of several species that have yellow wings with black tiger striping. Each hindwing has several blue markings (top and bottom). Like other striped swallowtails, it has a small orange eyespot near the lower angle of each hindwing; the eyespots can fool predators into attacking the rear of the butterfly instead of the head, giving the butterfly a chance to escape. Its appearance is similar to the western, and eastern tiger swallowtails, but has narrower black stripes and usually two tails on each hindwing (rather than only one). Most two-tails have a black "slit pupil" in the orange eyespot on each hindwing, never present in western tiger. It is also usually larger than similar swallowtails within its range, although some eastern tiger swallowtails are as big as any two-tailed. The wingspan ranges from 3 to 6.5 inches (7.6 to 16.5 cm), making it the largest swallowtail in western North America. As is the case with most swallowtails, females are larger and more brightly colored than males, having more blue in a submarginal band around orange spots on the hindwing upperside, and a deeper yellow background color that can shade to orange. Females also have wider black stripes on the forewings than males. Males may engage in mud-puddling, and have claspers that can be seen as a yellow segment at the end of the abdomen, beyond the black abdominal stripes.

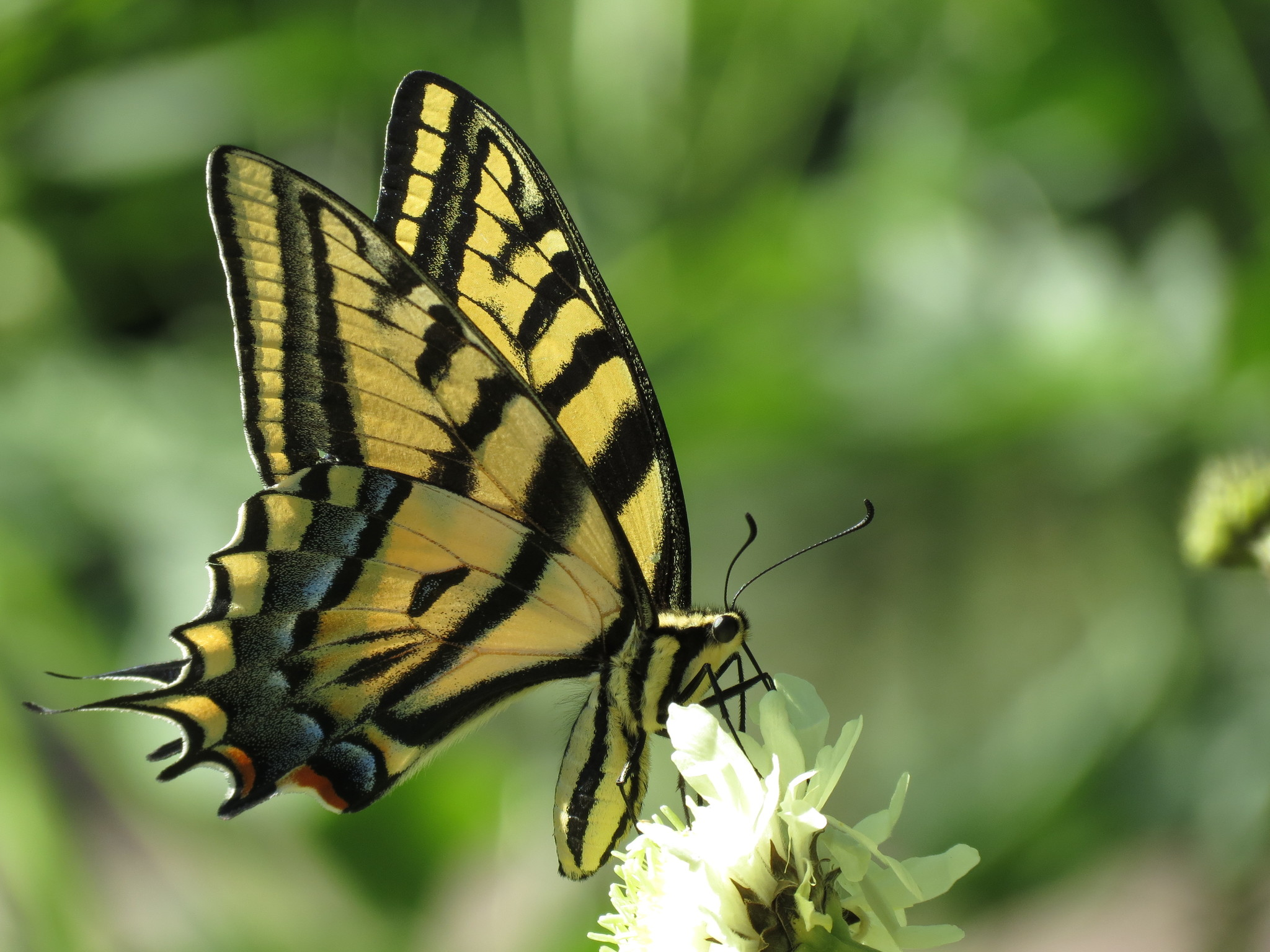
Female nectaring, with wide black stripes on her forewings

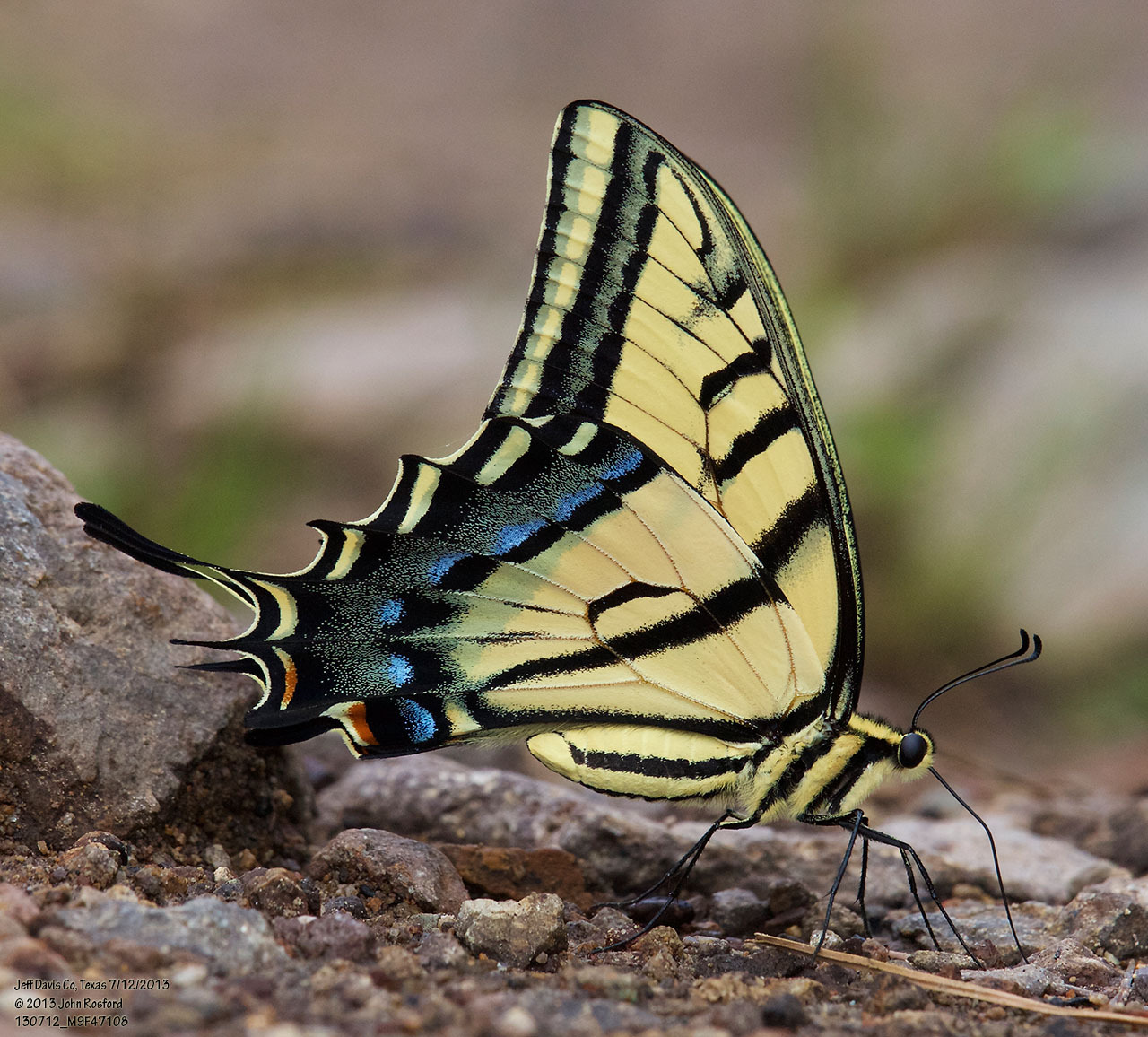
Male mud-puddling, with narrow stripes and claspers

It does not tend to hybridize with related species as do the western, eastern, and Canadian tiger swallowtails.

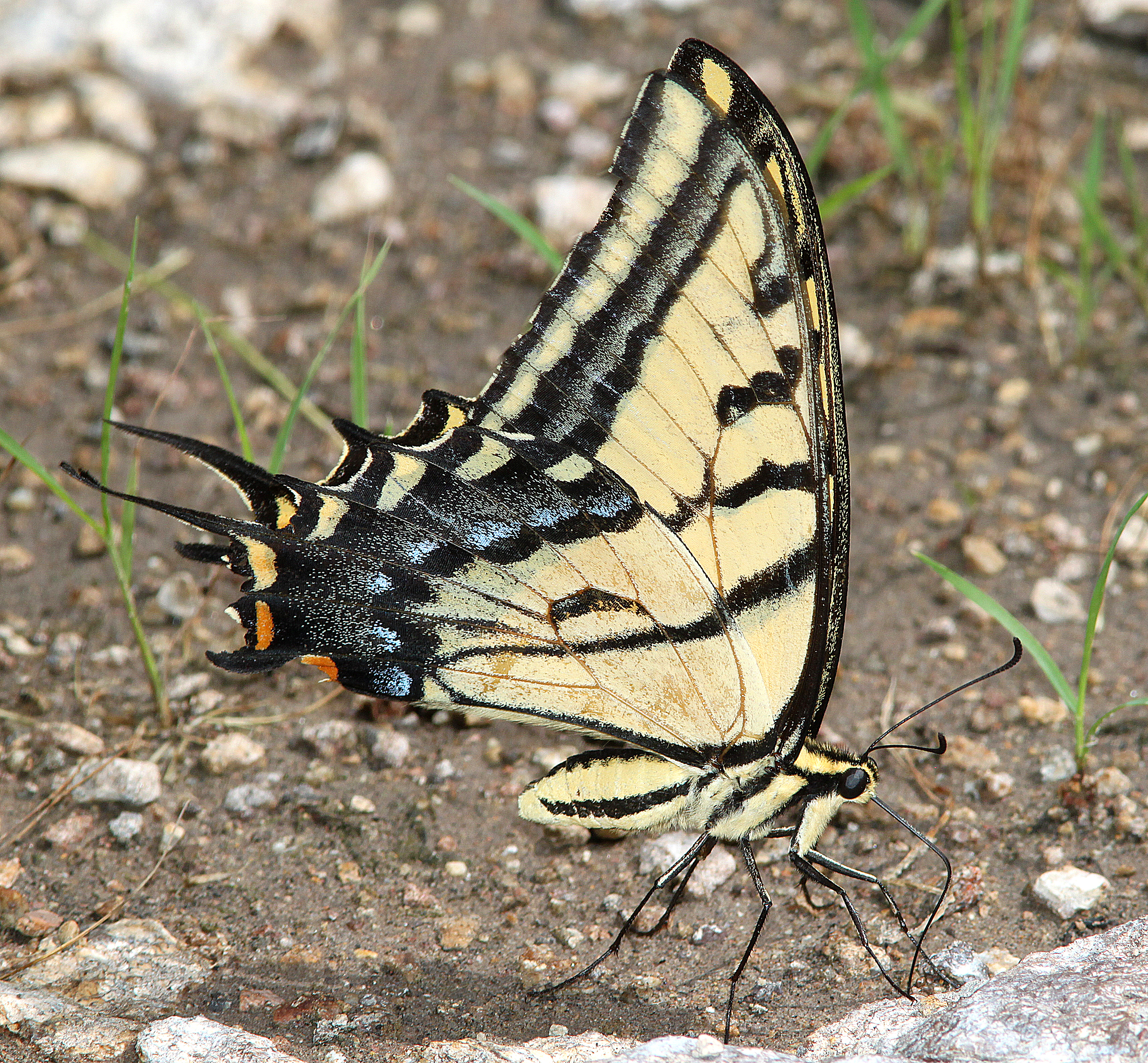
Mud-puddling in Arizona, United States

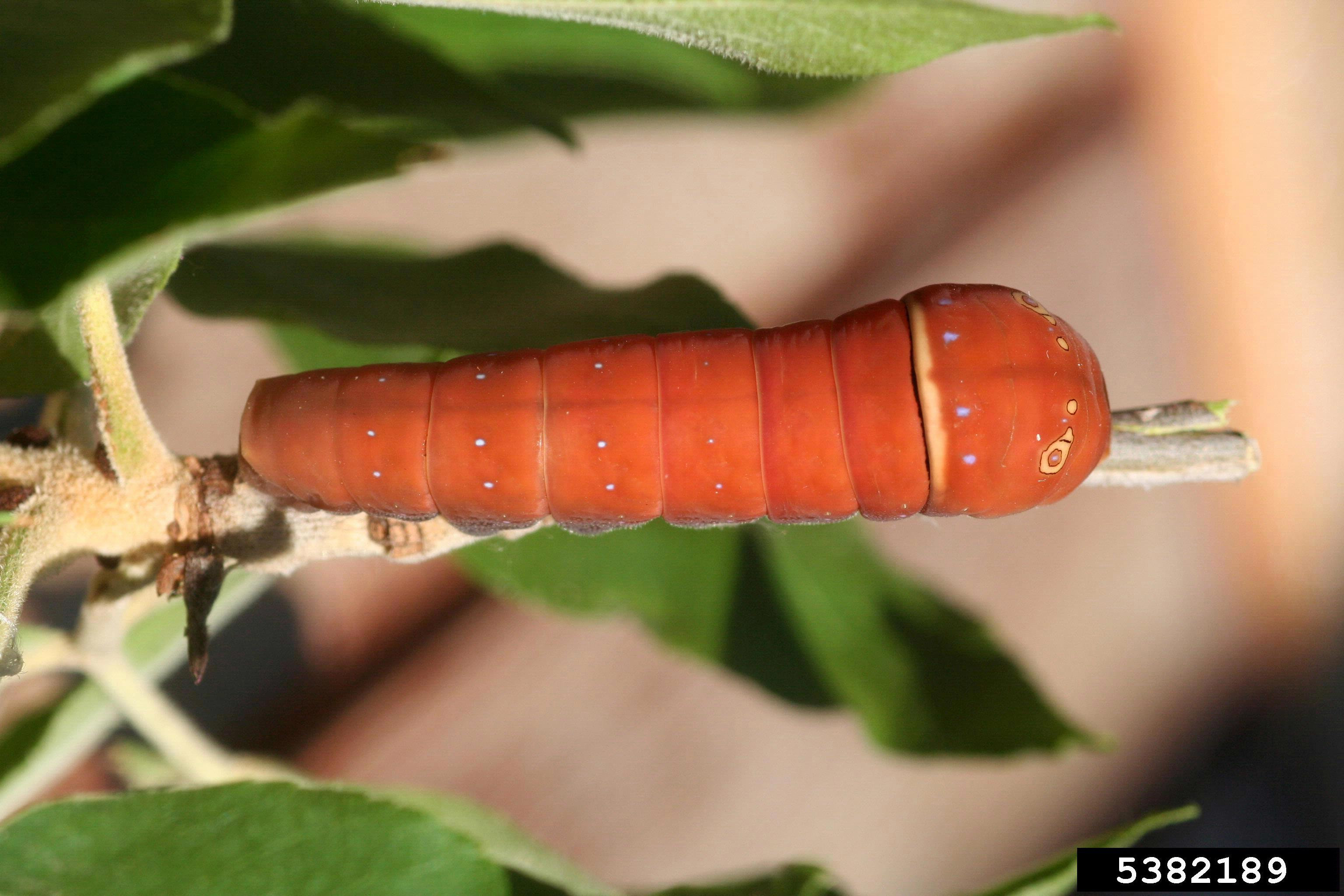
Caterpillar

The butterfly can be seen from Guatemala, through Mexico, the western United States to southern Canada in southern British Columbia, Alberta and southwestern Saskatchewan. It typically lives near streams and in moist valleys but also in canyons and cities at lower elevations.

Host plants include: chokecherry, bitter cherry, Arizona rosewood, single-leaf ash, hoptree, and Arizona sycamore. In California it mostly uses California hoptree. Elsewhere in the West, it often uses green ash planted along city roads (in California, city habitats are usually occupied by western tiger swallowtails rather than two-tailed).

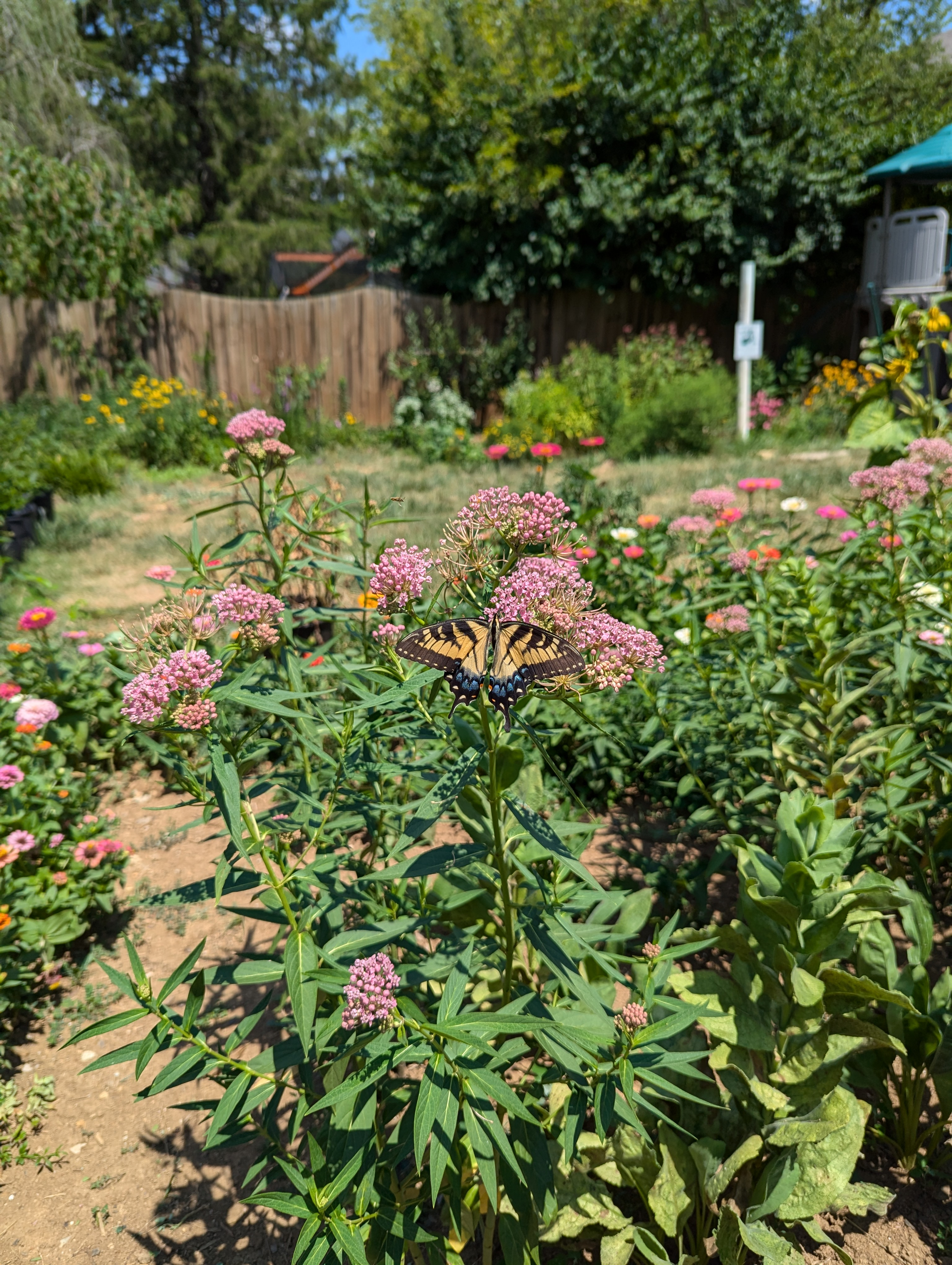
Papilio multicaudata, the two-tailed swallowtail, on Swamp Milkweed

The two-tailed swallowtail is the state butterfly of Arizona.

== Life cycle ==
Adults fly during spring and summer and there is one brood. Females lay eggs singly on the host plant. The caterpillar will fold the host plant's leaves and tie them together with silk they will then eat from this structure. The pupae will overwinter then emerge in May.

== Subspecies ==
Listed alphabetically:

- P. m. grandiosus Austin & Emmel, 1998 – Mexican mountains.
- P. m. multicaudata Kirby, 1884 – widespread subspecies from southern Colorado, northern New Mexico, south through Arizona, New Mexico, Texas and much of Mexico.
- P. m. pusillus Austin & Emmel, 1998 – widespread northern subspecies, in Rockies from southern Colorado north to Canada, throughout Washington and Oregon, and south along Pacific Coast at least to Ventura County, California, as well as in Sierras and Great Basin.
