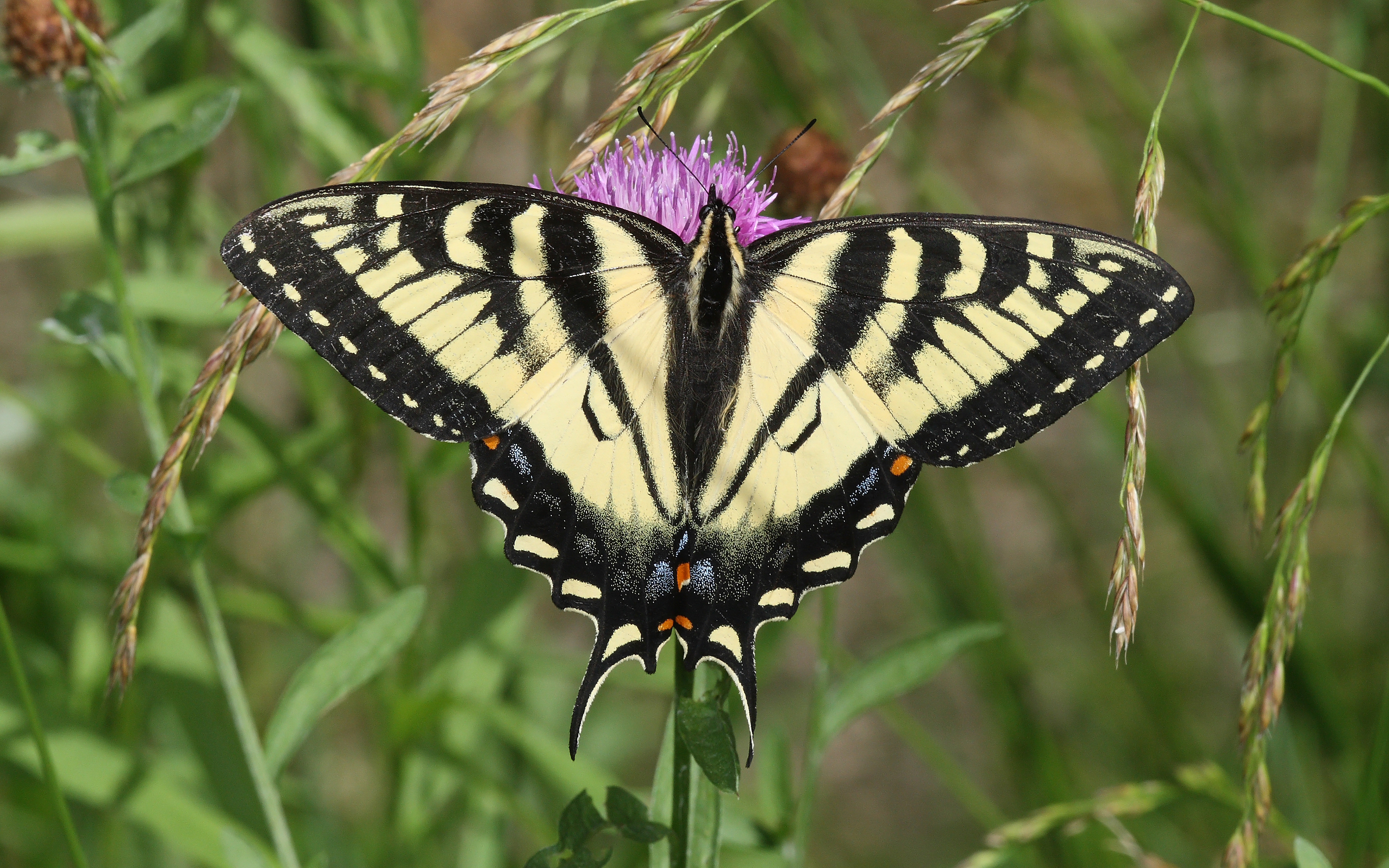

Conservation status
- Secure (NatureServe)

Scientific classification
- Kingdom: Animalia
- Phylum: Arthropoda
- Clade: Pancrustacea
- Class: Insecta
- Order: Lepidoptera
- Family: Papilionidae
- Genus: Papilio
- Species: P. canadensis

Binomial name
- Papilio canadensis (Rothschild & Jordan, 1906)
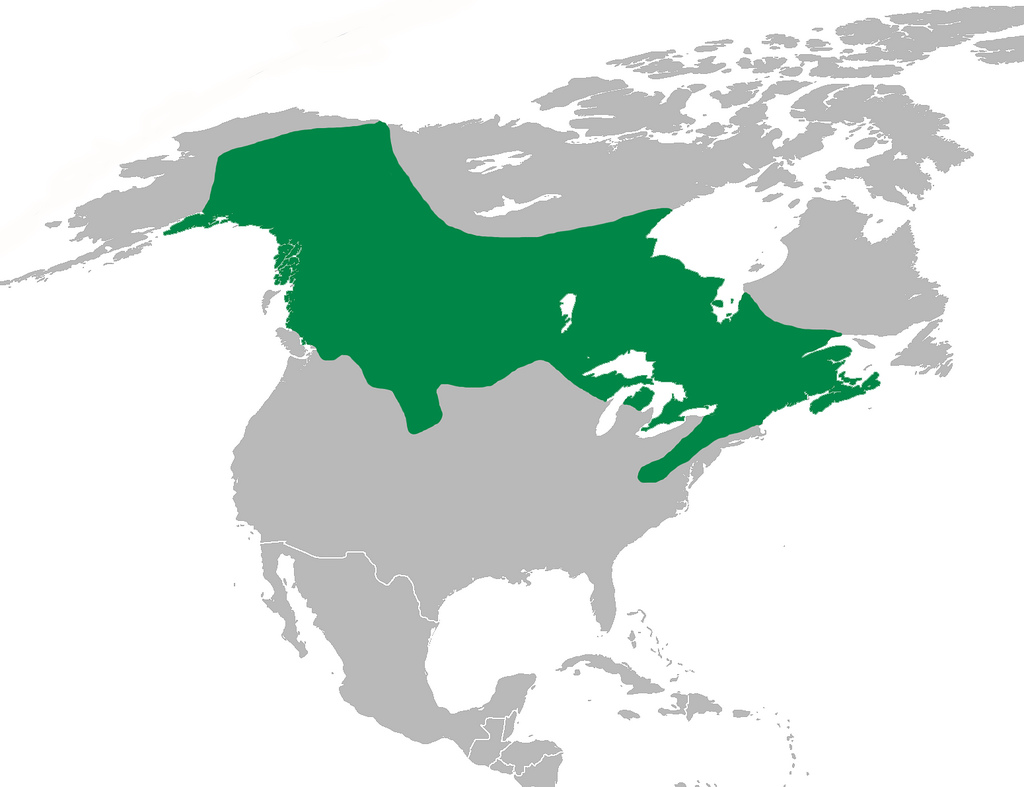

Synonyms
- Pterourus canadensis

= Papilio canadensis =

Canadian tiger swallowtail

Species of butterfly

Papilio canadensis, the Canadian tiger swallowtail, is a species of butterfly in the family Papilionidae. It was once classified as a subspecies of Papilio glaucus.

== Description ==
=== Adult ===
The wingspan of this species is 67 to 80 mm. It is very similar to the eastern tiger swallowtail, but has a noticeably smaller wingspan. Unlike it, the forewing underside, yellow marginal band is continuous. The hindwing has many orange scales on both morphs. This species has also been known to hybridize with both the eastern and western tiger swallowtail, though extremely rarely.

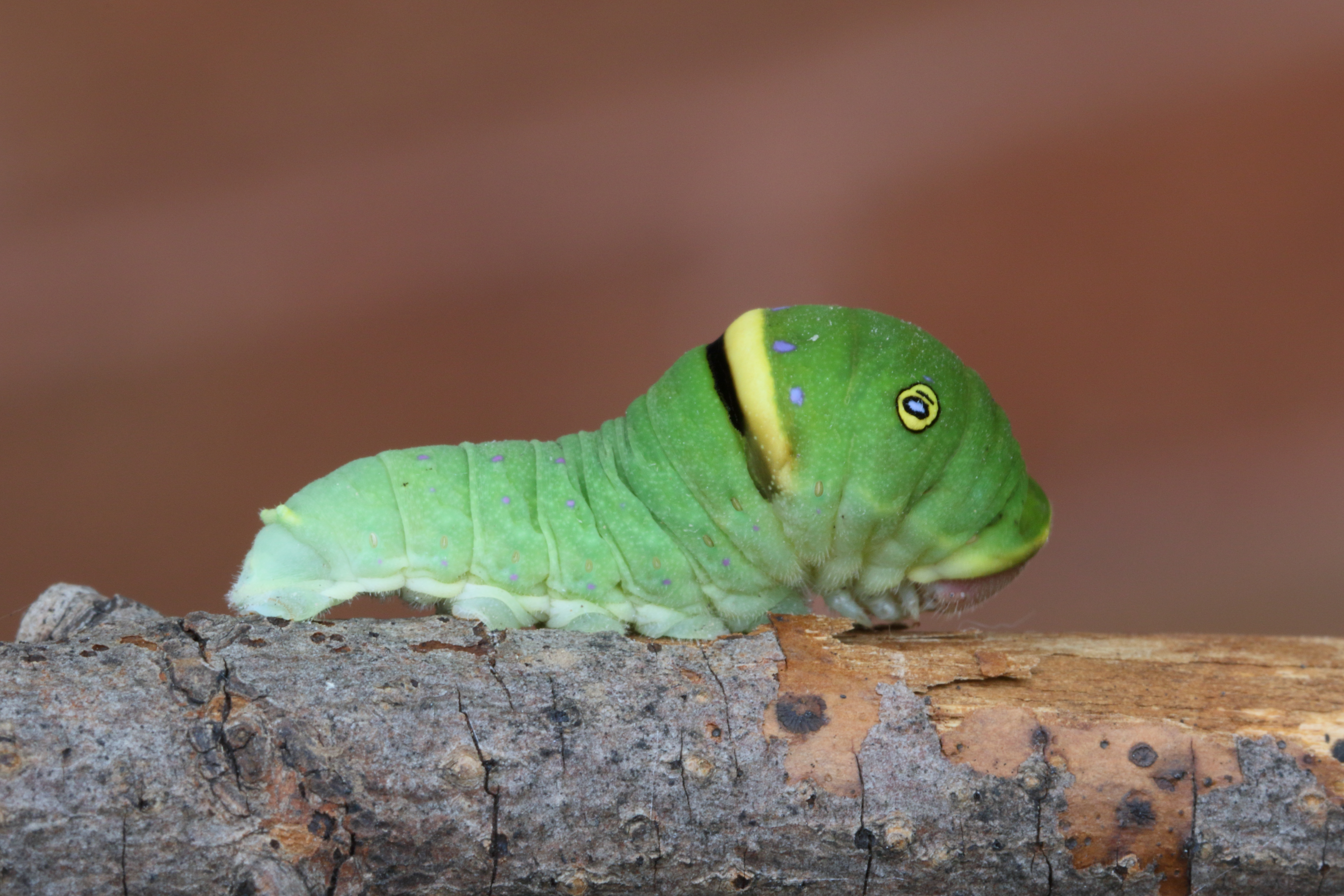
caterpillar

underside

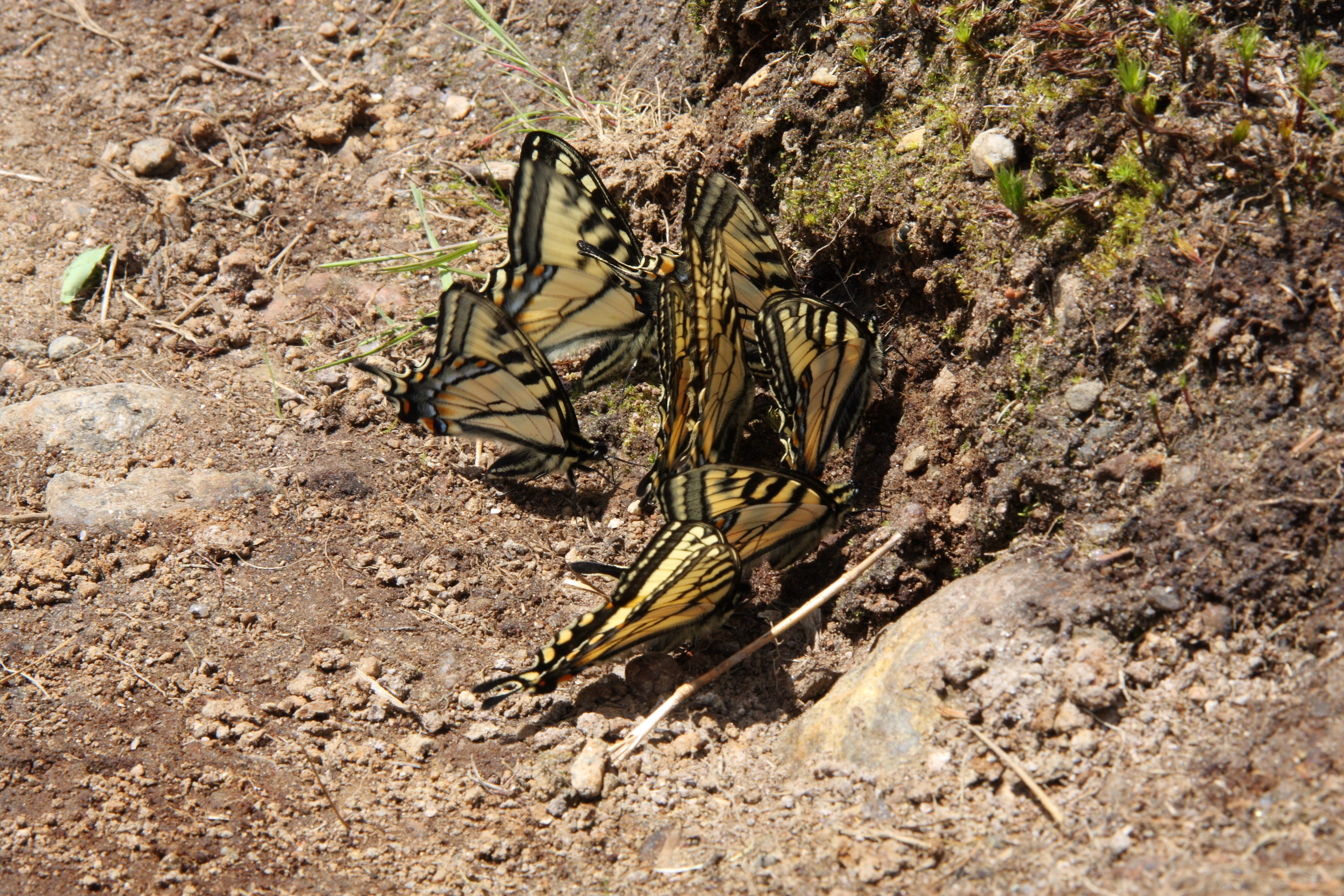
mud puddling, Jacques-Cartier National Park

=== Caterpillar ===
The caterpillar is large and green with an enlarged head. It has four yellow dots and two false eyes with bluish centers. In profile, this caterpillar appears snake-like. The immature larvae are brown and white to mimic bird droppings, making them unappealing to predators.

== Distribution ==
This butterfly is found in most provinces and territories in Canada, as its name implies. Its range extends north of the Arctic Circle in the Yukon, and to Churchill in Manitoba, Little Shagamu River in Ontario, and to Schefferville in Quebec. It does not occur in southern British Columbia, being replaced there by the western tiger swallowtail, Papilio rutulus, or in some areas of southwestern Ontario, approximately west of Toronto, where it is replaced by the eastern tiger swallowtail. It has not been reported from Labrador, but has been seen in western and central Newfoundland. It is seen in the northern third of the United States. Within this range, it is a very common and well-known butterfly, even more so around woodland edges. It is one of the most popular puddling species and often hundreds will gather at a single puddle.

== Life cycle ==
Adults fly during spring and summer and one brood occurs. Females lay eggs singly on the host plant. The caterpillar folds the host plant's leaves and ties them together with silk; they then eat from this structure. The pupae overwinter, then emerge in May.

=== Adult food ===
- Nectar

=== Larval food ===
- Betula – birches
- Populus – poplars, aspens, and cottonwoods
- Malus – apple trees
- Prunus serotina – black cherry
