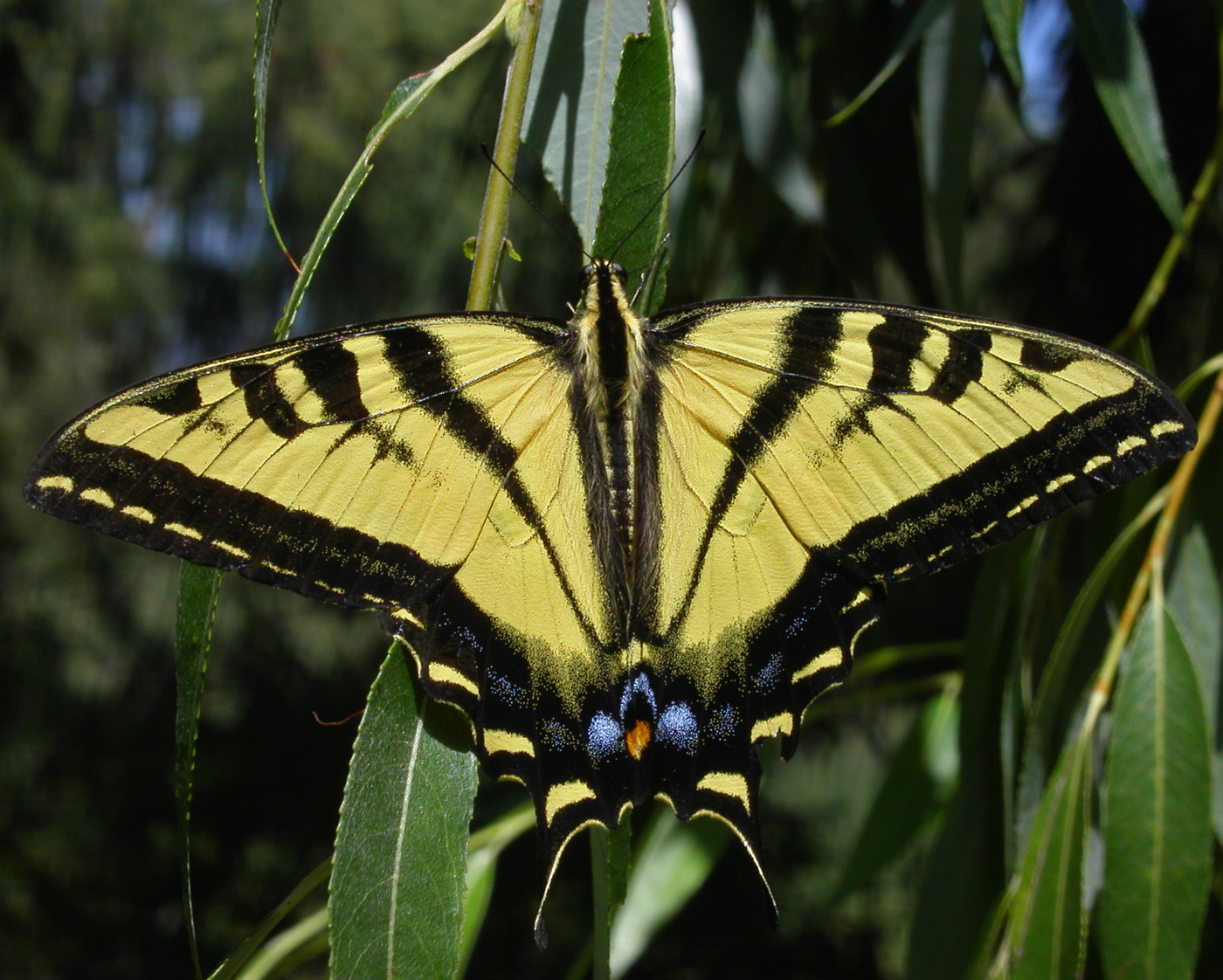
- Papilio rutulus. Dorsal view

Conservation status
- Secure (NatureServe)

Scientific classification
- Kingdom: Animalia
- Phylum: Arthropoda
- Clade: Pancrustacea
- Class: Insecta
- Order: Lepidoptera
- Family: Papilionidae
- Genus: Papilio
- Species: P. rutulus

Binomial name
- Papilio rutulus H. Lucas, 1852
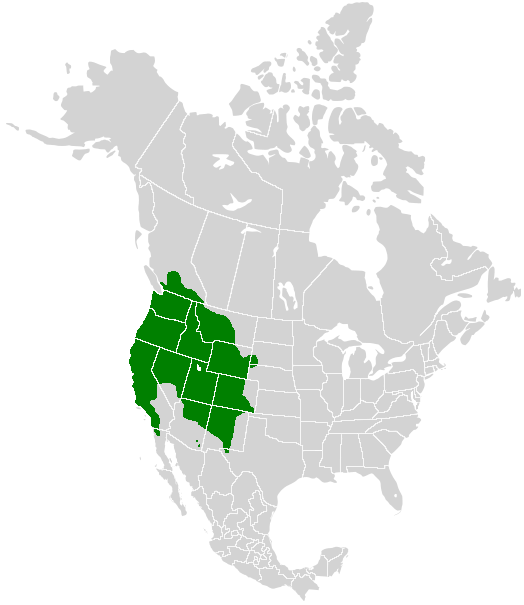

= Papilio rutulus =

Species of butterfly

Papilio rutulus, the western tiger swallowtail, is a swallowtail butterfly belonging to the Papilionidae family. The species was first described by Hippolyte Lucas in 1852.

Like the other tiger swallowtails, the western tiger swallowtail was formerly classified in genus Pterourus, but modern classifications all agree in placing them within Papilio.

== Distribution ==
The western tiger swallowtail butterfly is an abundant species native to a large portion of North America's northernmost and southernmost west coast.

These butterflies are frequently observed from northwestern regions of Canada down to the southern tip of Baja California and extends eastward through states like the Dakotas, Colorado, and New Mexico. Although they primarily inhabit the west coast, it is not unusual for this species to be observed as far east as central Nebraska, even Oklahoma. These occurrences are typically rare strays outside of its usual habitat.

== Habitat ==
These butterflies are frequently seen in urban parks and gardens, as well as in rural woodlands and riparian areas.

These butterflies can be found throughout Western North America, from South California to Southern British Columbia and Alberta.

== Description ==
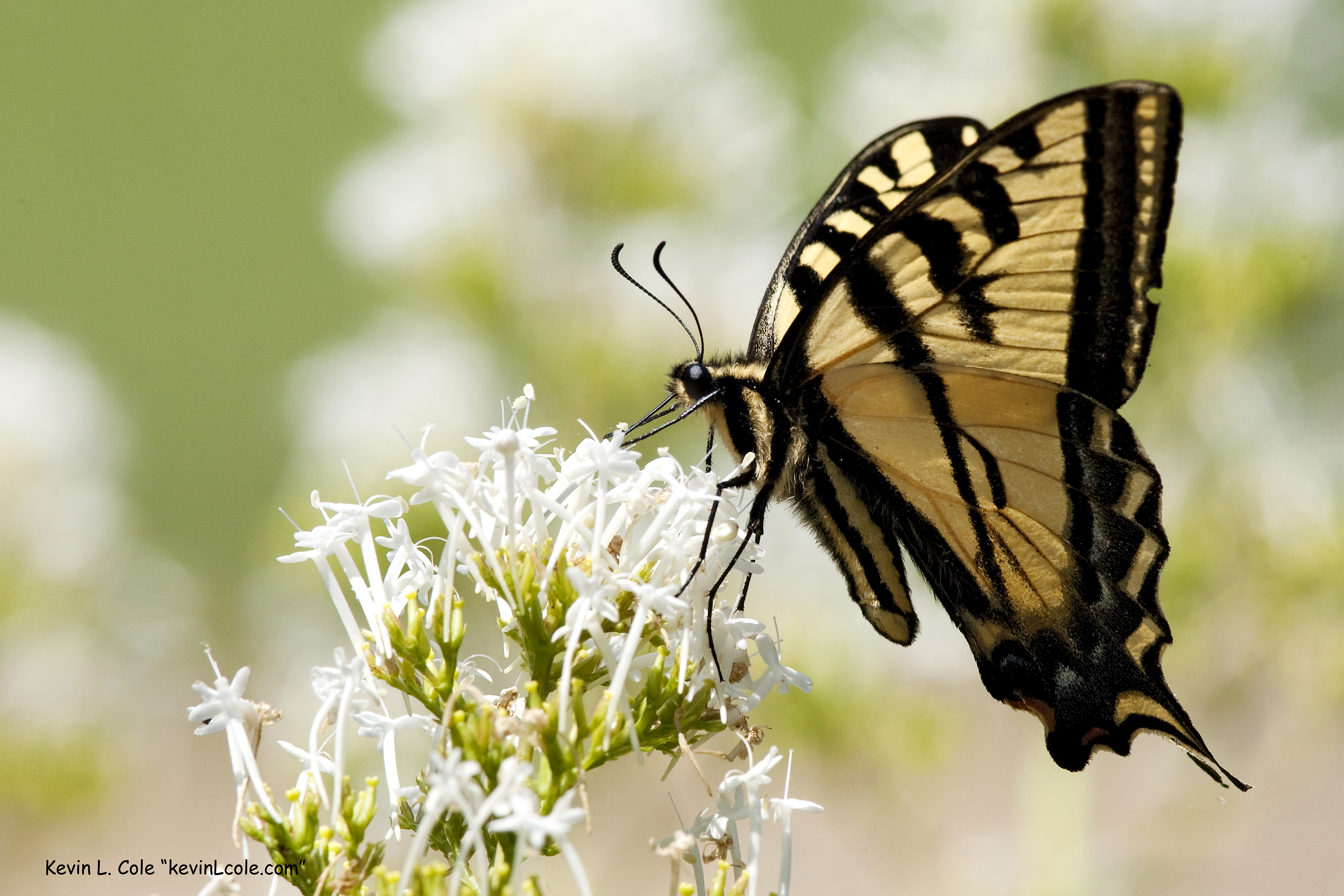
P. rutulus. Side view

Papilio rutulus can reach a wingspan of 7 to 10 cm (3 to 4 in). These large butterflies are brightly colored. The wings are yellow with black stripes and blue and orange spots near their tail, they have the "tails" on the hindwings that are often found in swallowtails.

Young caterpillars resemble bird droppings, and as they molt, they eventually turn bright green, with a pair of large yellow eyespots with black and blue pupils. The chrysalis is green in summer and dark brown in winter, and looks like a piece of wood.

Even as caterpillars, they need to find a way to protect themselves from threats during their early development. In their caterpillar stage, they mimic a snake with the tongue like osmeterium ( a defensive organ ) and two eyespots on the thorax to ward off potential predators.

== Biology ==
Butterflies emerge from winter chrysalids between the spring months of February and May, the date depending on the temperature, so they are seen earlier in the more southerly and more coastal parts of their range. They are very active butterflies, rarely seen at rest. The adult females lay up to a hundred eggs in total. The eggs are deep green, shiny, and spherical. They are laid singly, on the undersides of leaves.

The caterpillars emerge about four days later. They can feed on the leaves of a variety of trees, and the predominant food plant varies across their range; trees commonly used include cottonwood, willow, quaking aspen, and many others.

The caterpillars molt four times, eventually reaching a length up to 5 cm before pupating. In summer, the butterfly can emerge as quickly as 15 days after the caterpillar pupates, but when the caterpillar pupates in the fall, the butterfly does not emerge until the spring.

The males often congregate, along with other species of swallowtail, at pools and along streams and rivers; they drink from the water and mud, extracting minerals, as well as moisture. Females lay eggs singly on the surface of host plant leaves. Caterpillars feed on leaves and rest on silken mats in shelters of curled leaves. Chrysalids hibernate.

== Life cycle ==
The life cycle of tiger swallowtail butterflies begins when a female carefully lays individual eggs on different host plants, ensuring that the larvae have enough space and resources to thrive without overcrowding. After hatching, the caterpillar goes through multiple developmental stages. In its early stages, the caterpillar resembles bird droppings for camouflage and has eye spots to defend against predators.

Once the larval stage is complete, the caterpillar enters the pupal stage, forming a chrysalis–a hard shell used for protection while it develops into a butterfly. The pupal stage can last from a couple of weeks to several months, depending on environmental conditions.

The caterpillar undergoes metamorphosis and emerges a butterfly. In the adult stage, within a few hours of emerging, the butterfly's wings dry and expand, allowing it to fly. During this stage, the butterfly focuses on reproduction and finding a mate. Once the female is fertilized, the cycle begins again.

== Behavior ==
Due to their remarkable adaptations, the western tiger swallowtail butterfly can flourish in temperate and boreal woodlands, especially in northern North America. Unlike many tropical swallowtail species, western tiger swallowtails can tolerate cold winters as diapausing pupae, frequently surviving beneath snow by physiological processes that may involve cryoprotectants. Their developmental success at higher latitudes has been attributed to their ability to feed on a diverse variety of host plants, extending beyond the tropical families that the majority of swallowtails rely on.

These butterflies exhibit a seasonal flying pattern, with males emerging in the spring to mate with females, who then lay fertilized eggs on host plants. As a way to protect themselves from predators or enhance leaf quality, the larvae occasionally engage in leaf-clipping behaviors as they develop and feed on them. They typically have one to three generations each year, depending on the region, and adult butterflies tend to be smaller in colder climates, allowing for better survival in shorter growth seasons.

== Gallery ==
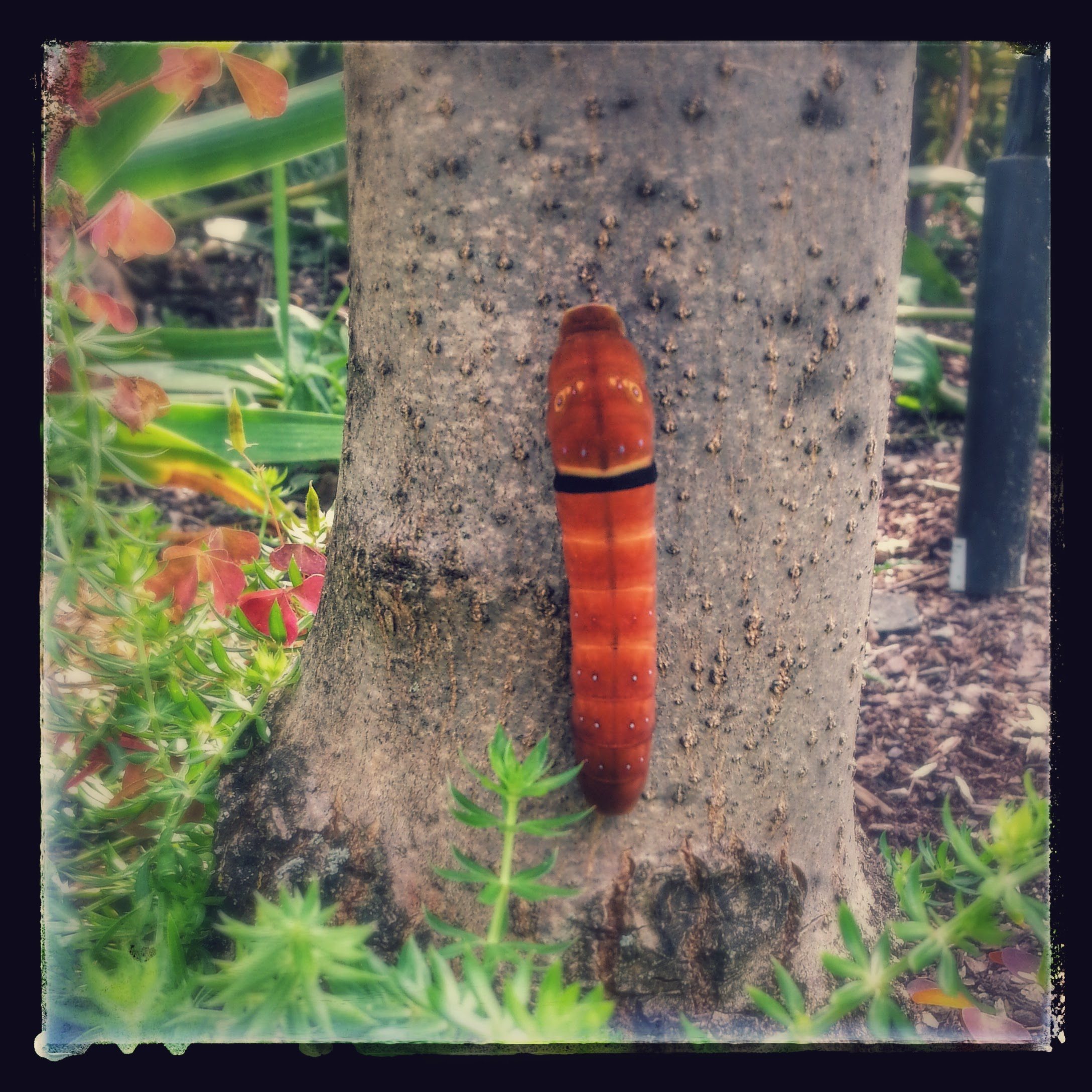
Caterpillar, pre-pupal state

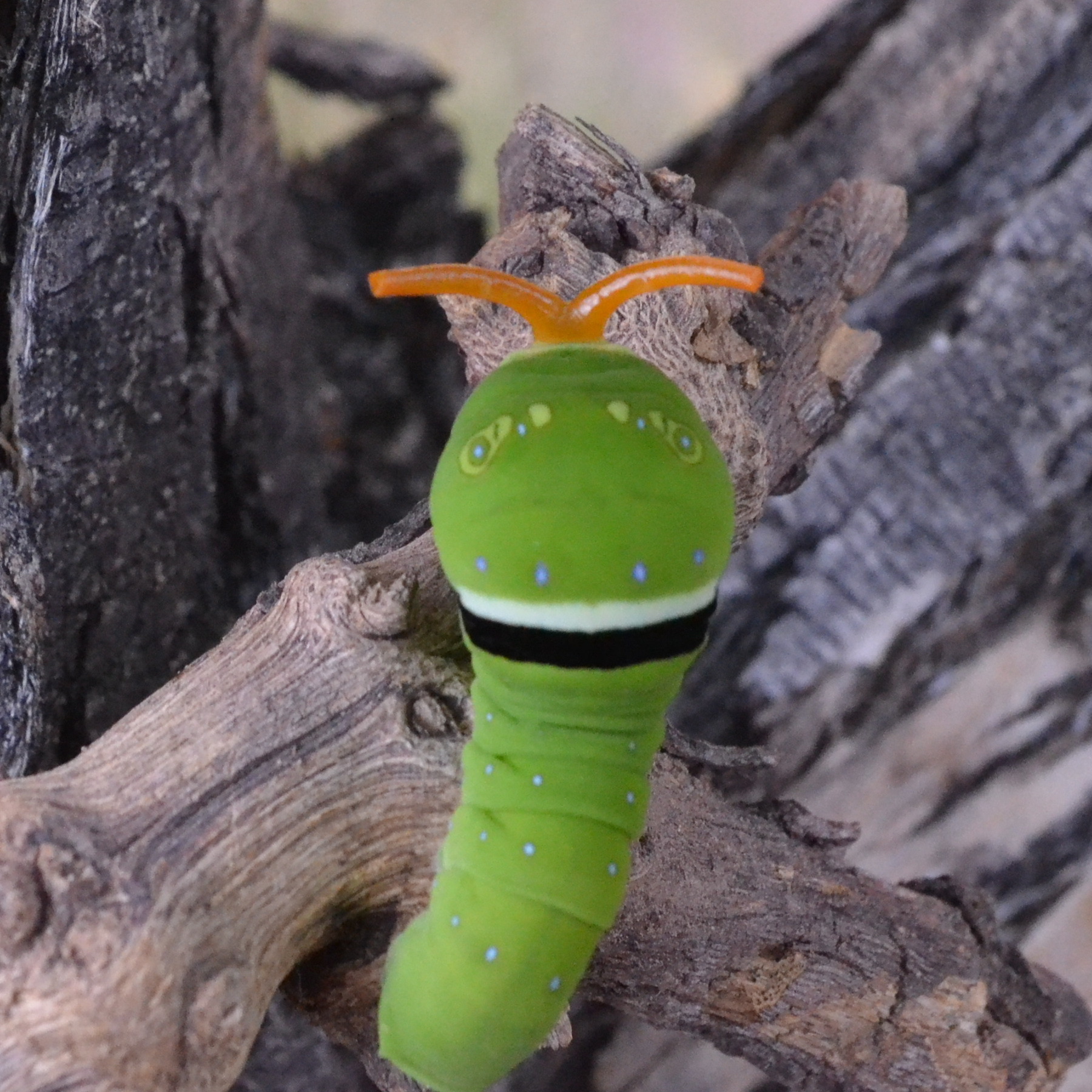
Caterpillar extending osmeterium

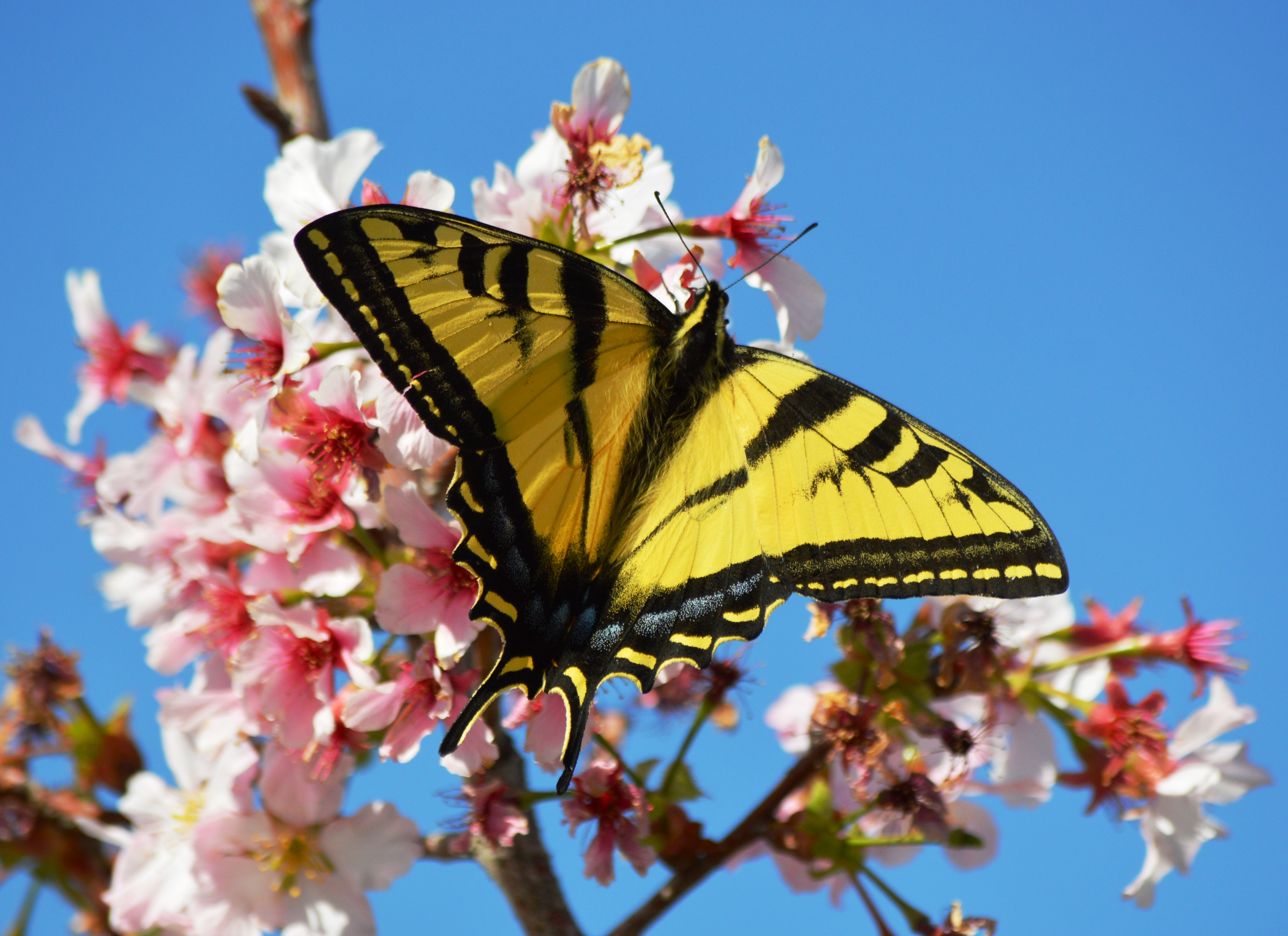
Adult of P. rutulus on Prunus serrulata

Video clip

== See also ==
- Canadian tiger swallowtail
