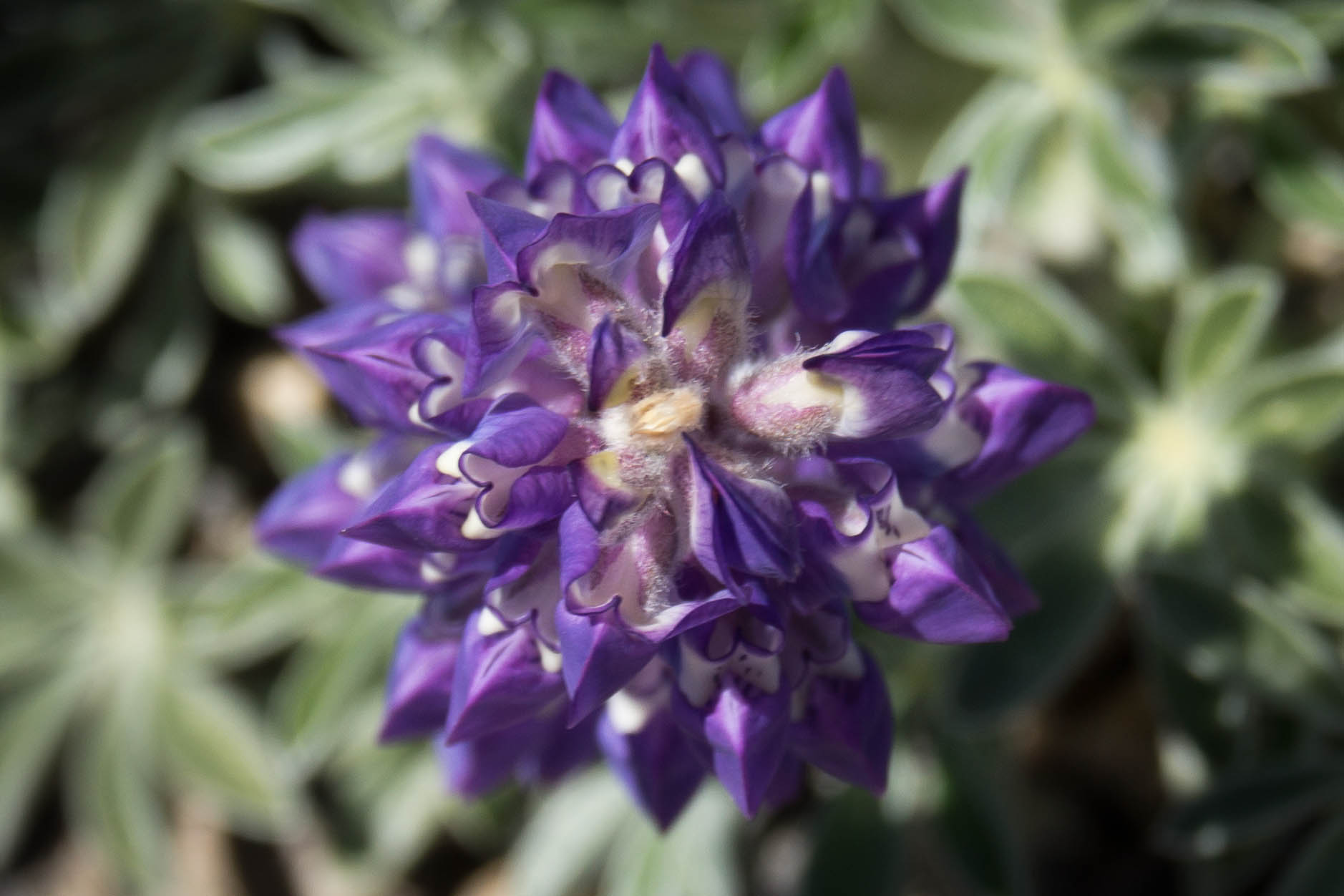

Conservation status
- Imperiled (NatureServe)

Scientific classification
- Kingdom: Plantae
- Clade: Tracheophytes
- Clade: Angiosperms
- Clade: Eudicots
- Clade: Rosids
- Order: Fabales
- Family: Fabaceae
- Subfamily: Faboideae
- Genus: Lupinus
- Species: L. duranii

Binomial name
- Lupinus duranii Eastw.

= Lupinus duranii =

Species of legume

Lupinus duranii is a species of lupine known by the common name Mono Lake lupine. It is endemic to California, where it is known mainly from the eastern slopes of the Sierra Nevada in western Mono County. Its distribution includes Mammoth Mountain and the hills around Mono Lake, and its habitat has gravelly, pumice-rich soils of volcanic origin.

It is almost identical to the nominate variety of Brewer's lupine, which occurs commonly in the same region. Besides the fact that L. breweri does not occur on pumice flats, the pair are difficult to separate.

== Description ==
This is a tough, compact perennial herb forming tufts no more than about 12 centimetres (4.7 in) tall. The basal palmate leaves are made up of 5 to 8 shaggy-haired leaflets up to 2 centimetres (0.79 in) long. The inflorescence is a crowded raceme of flowers, each about a centimeter long and arranged in whorls about the stout, hairy stem. The flower is purple with a white patch on its banner. It yields a legume pod 1 centimetre or 2 centimetres (0.79 in) long containing white seeds.
