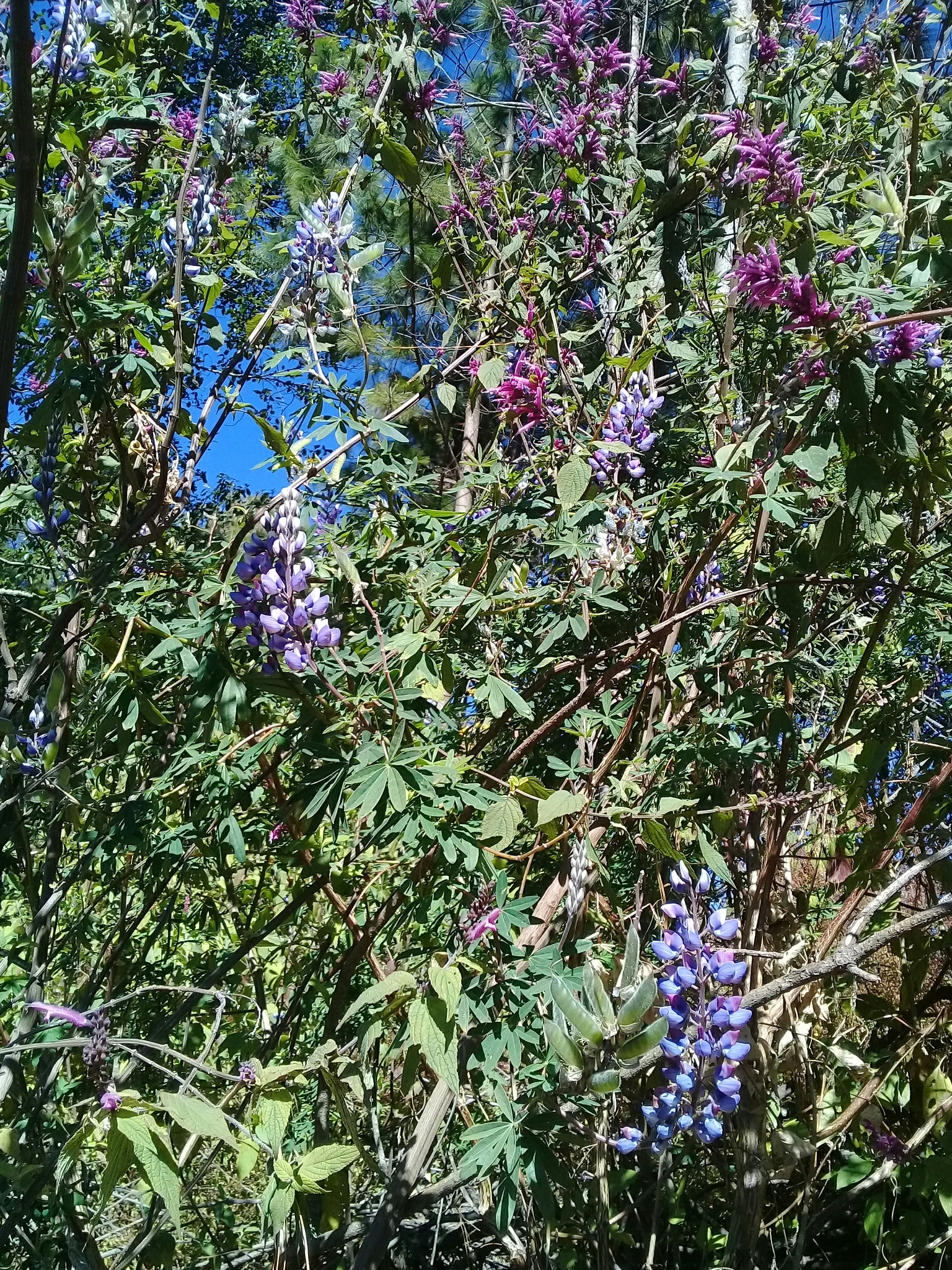

Scientific classification
- Kingdom: Plantae
- Clade: Tracheophytes
- Clade: Angiosperms
- Clade: Eudicots
- Clade: Rosids
- Order: Fabales
- Family: Fabaceae
- Subfamily: Faboideae
- Genus: Lupinus
- Species: L. exaltatus

Binomial name
- Lupinus exaltatus Zucc.

Synonyms
- Lupinus dispar C.P.Sm.; Lupinus elegans var. exaltatus (Zucc.) C.P.Sm.; Lupinus ferax C.P.Sm.; Lupinus fictomagnus C.P.Sm.; Lupinus grandis Rose; Lupinus monteportae C.P.Sm.; Lupinus paraplesius C.P.Sm.; Lupinus tancitaricus C.P.Sm.

= Lupinus exaltatus =

Species of flowering plant

Lupinus exaltatus, the Mexican lupine, is a species of flowering plant in the family Fabaceae. It is native to Mexico.

== Description ==
L. exaltatus is a flowering plant that grows to a height of approximately 4 ft (1.2 m), with a spread of about 3 ft (0.91 m) wide. Growth is from a central stem which branches frequently. The blooming period lasts for several weeks, commencing about mid-January and continuing to late March. The seed produced is small, hard, persists in the soil, and volunteers readily in the autumn months.

== Habitat ==
L. exaltatus may be found growing in oak forest, roadside verges, and land disturbed by agricultural activities.

== Properties ==
Research suggests that lupin extracts may have a beneficial effect on the growth and yield of various cultivated plants. Alcoholic extract from Lupinus exaltatus seeds introduced in different doses to soil has increased paprika fruit yield. Wild legumes, such as Lupinus exaltus, have significant quantities of proteins, essential amino acids, polyunsaturated fatty acids, dietary fibre, minerals, and essential vitamins, comparable to edible legumes, in addition to the presence of beneficial bioactive compounds.
