= Lupinus tamayoanus =

Scientific classification
- Kingdom: Plantae
- Clade: Tracheophytes
- Clade: Angiosperms
- Clade: Eudicots
- Clade: Rosids
- Order: Fabales
- Family: Fabaceae
- Subfamily: Faboideae
- Genus: Lupinus
- Species: L. tamayoanus

Binomial name
- Lupinus tamayoanus C.P.Sm.

Species of legume

Lupinus tamayoanus is a plant of the genus Lupinus in the legume family. Lupinus tamayoanus was described in 1942 from samples collected in Mérida, Venezuela.
