= Lupinus holmgrenianus =

Conservation status
- Imperiled (NatureServe)

Scientific classification
- Kingdom: Plantae
- Clade: Tracheophytes
- Clade: Angiosperms
- Clade: Eudicots
- Clade: Rosids
- Order: Fabales
- Family: Fabaceae
- Subfamily: Faboideae
- Genus: Lupinus
- Species: L. holmgrenianus

Binomial name
- Lupinus holmgrenianus C.P.Sm.

Species of legume

Lupinus holmgrenianus is a species of lupine known by the common name Holmgren's lupine. It is native to the desert mountains of western Nevada and a few ranges of adjacent Inyo County, California, including the Last Chance Range of Death Valley National Park. This is a hairy perennial herb growing erect to a maximum height near 70 centimetres (28 in). Each palmate leaf is made up of 4 to 7 leaflets up to 5 centimetres (2.0 in) long. The inflorescence is a spiral of flowers each just over a centimeter long. They are purple in color with yellow patches on their banners. The fruit is a hairy legume pod 4 or 5 centimeters long.
