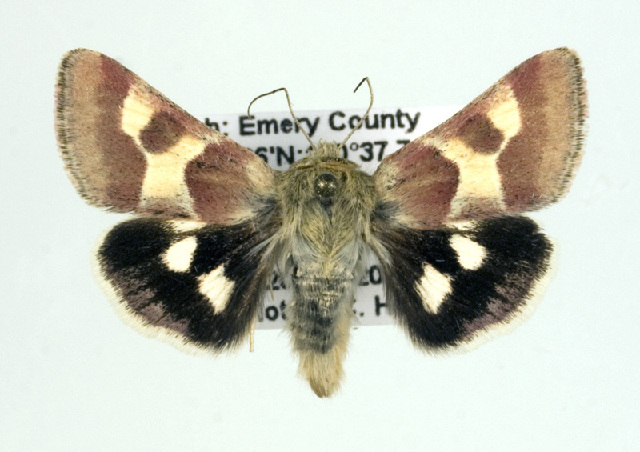

Scientific classification
- Kingdom: Animalia
- Phylum: Arthropoda
- Class: Insecta
- Order: Lepidoptera
- Superfamily: Noctuoidea
- Family: Noctuidae
- Genus: Schinia
- Species: S. suetus

Binomial name
- Schinia suetus Grote, 1873

Synonyms
- Schinia sueta; Heliothis suetus Grote, 1873

= Schinia suetus =

Species of moth

Schinia suetus is a moth of the family Noctuidae first described by Augustus Radcliffe Grote in 1873. It is widespread in the mountains of western North America, from southern Alberta west to British Columbia, south at least to Colorado and California, east to Idaho and New Mexico.

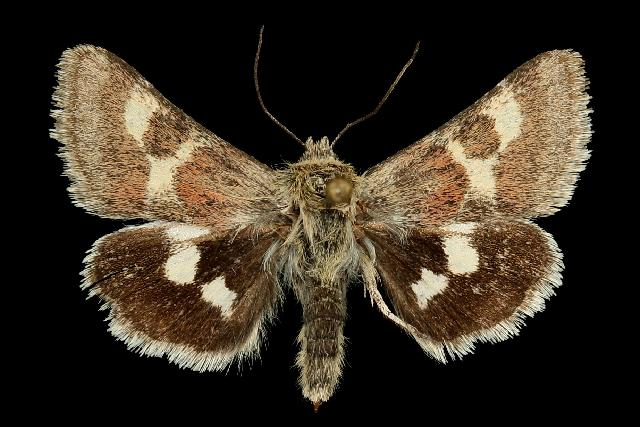
Schinia suetus martini

The wingspan is about 25 mm. Adults are on wing from June to July depending on the location.

The larvae feed on Lupinus.

== Subspecies ==
- Schinia suetus suetus
- Schinia suetus californica
- Schinia suetus martini
- Schinia suetus sierrae
