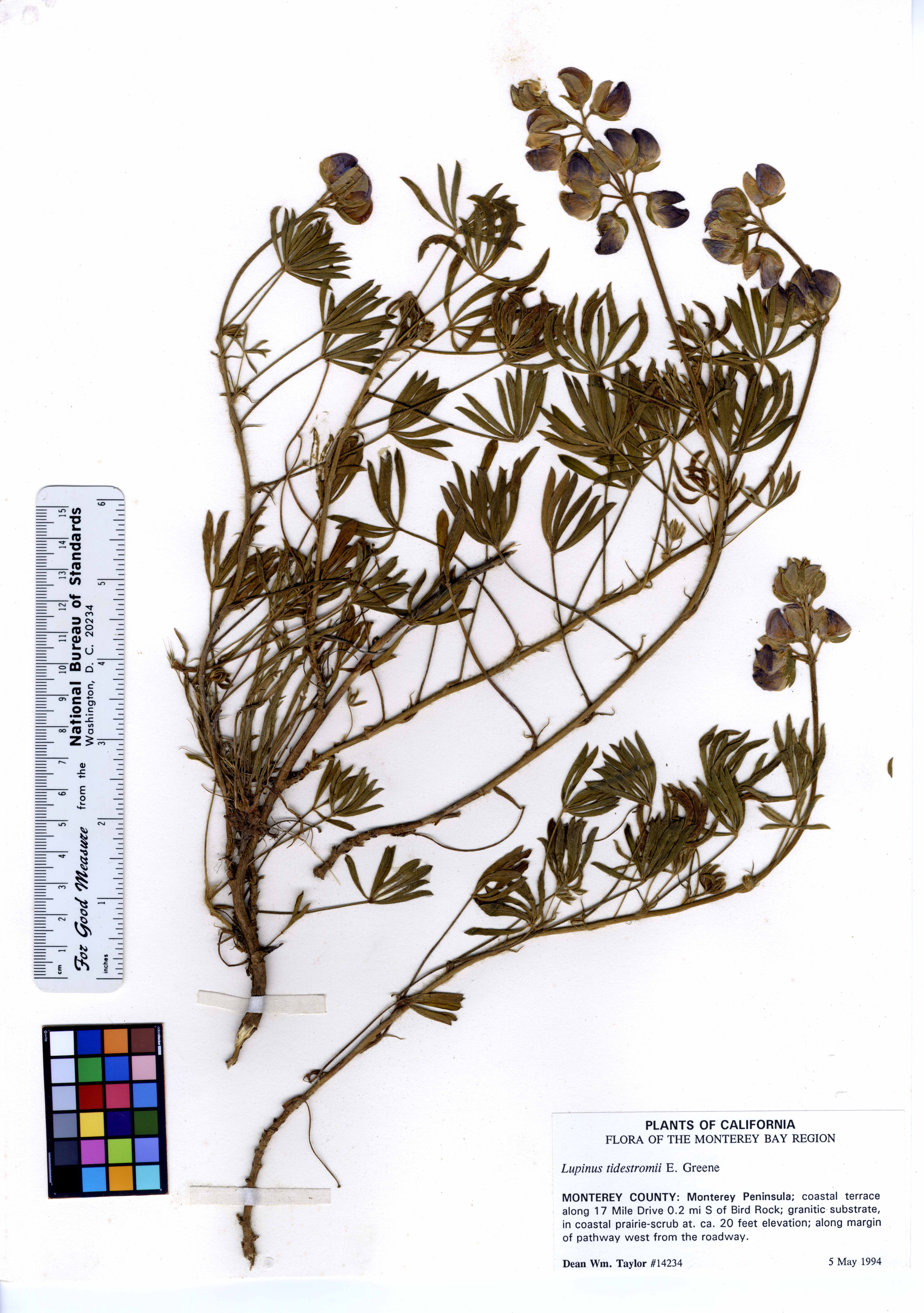

Conservation status
- Endangered (ESA)

Scientific classification
- Kingdom: Plantae
- Clade: Tracheophytes
- Clade: Angiosperms
- Clade: Eudicots
- Clade: Rosids
- Order: Fabales
- Family: Fabaceae
- Subfamily: Faboideae
- Genus: Lupinus
- Species: L. tidestromii

Binomial name
- Lupinus tidestromii Greene

= Lupinus tidestromii =

Species of legume

Lupinus tidestromii is a rare species of lupine known by the common names clover lupine and Tidestrom's lupine. It is endemic to the coastline of California just to the north and south of the Golden Gate in Sonoma, Marin, and Monterey Counties. It is a plant of the sand dunes at separate beach locations in these counties. A very limited amount of this plant's habitat remains; it is a federally listed endangered species. Construction of golf courses on the Monterey Peninsula caused the extirpation of two known occurrences, and boardwalks were built at Asilomar State Beach to prevent trampling of the delicate dune habitat there.

This is a perennial herb producing a prostrate stem growing along the sand and reaching 10 to 30 centimeters in length. Each palmate leaf is made up of 3 to 5 leaflets measuring 1 or 2 centimeters in length. The herbage is coated in white woolly hairs. The small, upright inflorescence bears whorls of flowers each just over a centimeter in length. The flower is blue or purple with a white, yellow, or purplish patch on its banner. The fruit is a shaggy-haired legume pod 2 or 3 centimeters long.
