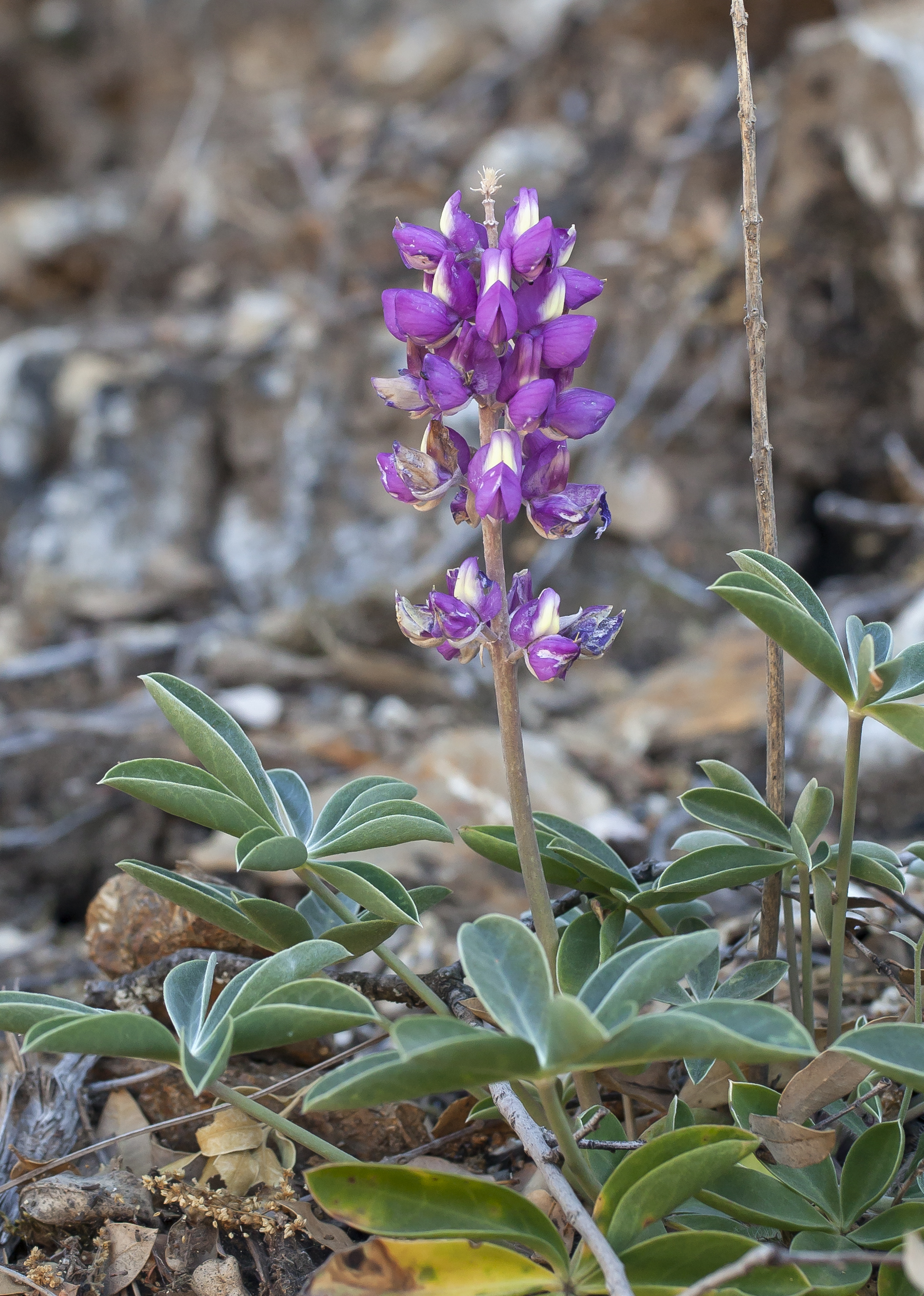

Conservation status
- Vulnerable (NatureServe)

Scientific classification
- Kingdom: Plantae
- Clade: Tracheophytes
- Clade: Angiosperms
- Clade: Eudicots
- Clade: Rosids
- Order: Fabales
- Family: Fabaceae
- Subfamily: Faboideae
- Genus: Lupinus
- Species: L. cervinus

Binomial name
- Lupinus cervinus Kellogg

Synonyms
- Lupinus latissimus

= Lupinus cervinus =

Species of legume

Lupinus cervinus is a species of lupine known by the common name Santa Lucia lupine. It is endemic to the Santa Lucia Mountains in the Central Coast Ranges in California, where it is an uncommon member of the flora in the mountain forests. This is a hairy gray-green perennial herb growing up to 30–70 centimetres (12–28 in) tall. The erect stem is surrounded by clusters of spreading leaves. Each palmate leaf is made up of 4 to 8 leaflets up to 8 centimetres (3.1 in) long and 3 centimetres (1.2 in) wide, which is wider than the leaflets of most lupines. The inflorescence bears many flowers, sometimes in whorls, each between 1 centimetre (0.39 in) and 2 centimetres (0.79 in) long. The flower is often bright pink, but may be shades of blue to nearly white. There is often a yellow patch on the banner. The fruit is a hairy legume pod up to 6 centimetres (2.4 in) long.
