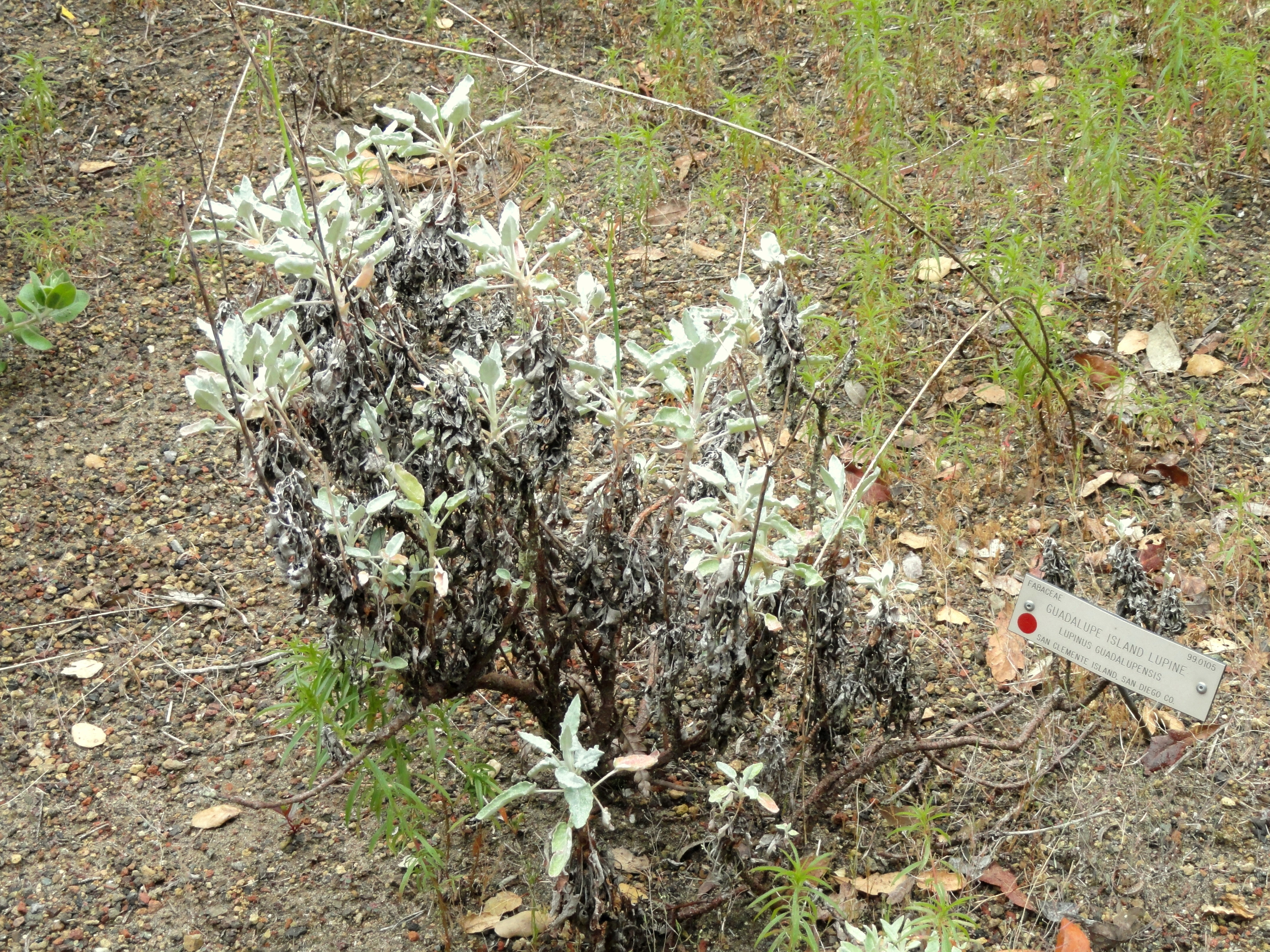

Scientific classification
- Kingdom: Plantae
- Clade: Tracheophytes
- Clade: Angiosperms
- Clade: Eudicots
- Clade: Rosids
- Order: Fabales
- Family: Fabaceae
- Subfamily: Faboideae
- Genus: Lupinus
- Species: L. guadalupensis

Binomial name
- Lupinus guadalupensis Greene

= Lupinus guadalupensis =

Species of legume

Lupinus guadalupensis is a rare species of lupine known by the common name Guadalupe Island lupine. It is known only from San Clemente Island, one of the Channel Islands of California, and Guadalupe Island off the coast of Baja California. It is a member of the coastal scrub growing alongside other island endemics and more common plants. This is an annual herb growing 20 to 60 centimeters high. Each palmate leaf is made up of 7 to 9 narrow leaflets up to 5 centimeters long and just a few millimeters wide, sometimes linear in shape. The inflorescence bears whorls of flowers each about a centimeter long and blue in color with a white banner patch which may fade pink. The fruit is a very hairy legume pod up to 6 centimeters long and about one wide. It contains 6 to 8 seeds.
