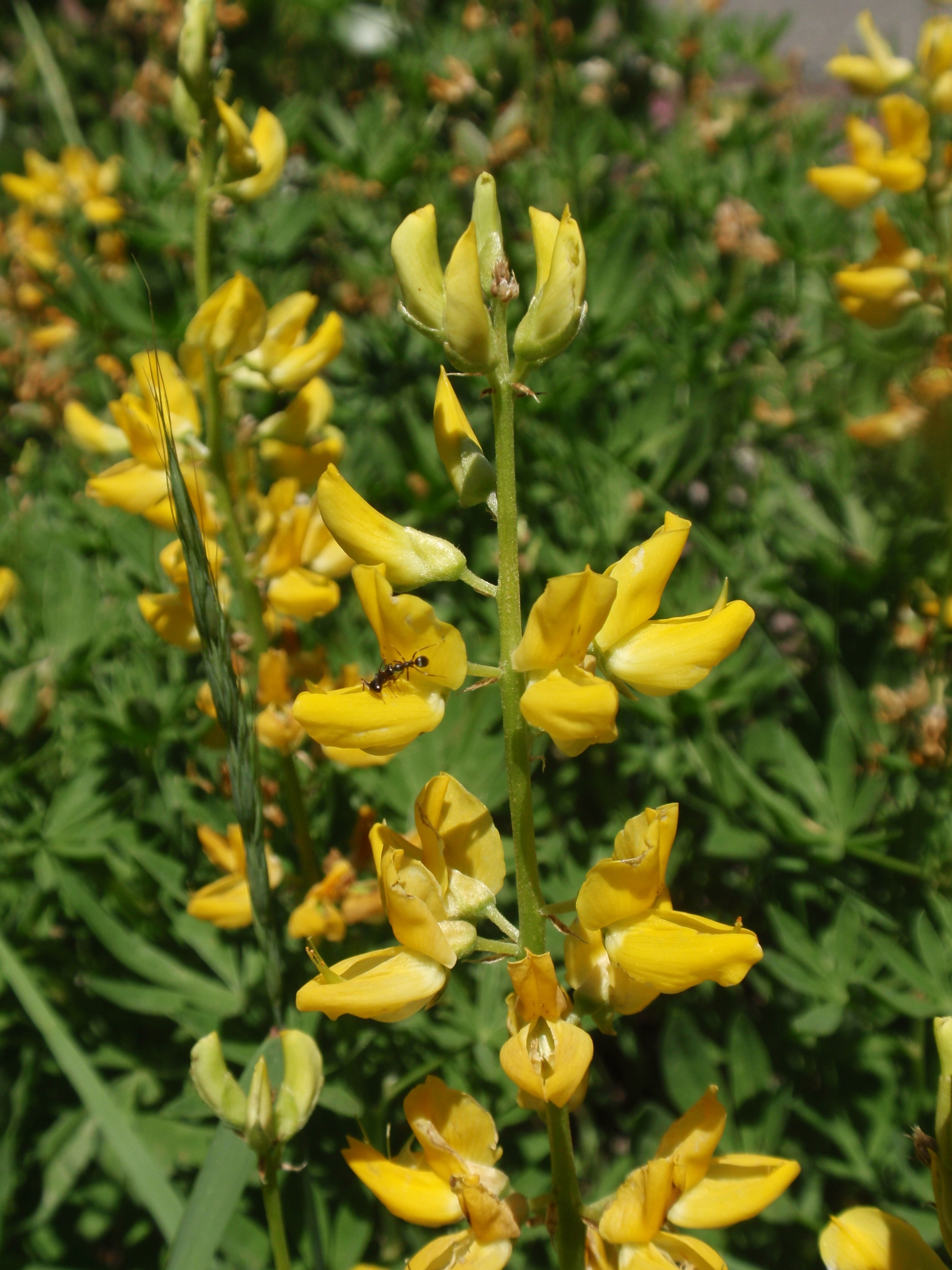

Scientific classification
- Kingdom: Plantae
- Clade: Tracheophytes
- Clade: Angiosperms
- Clade: Eudicots
- Clade: Rosids
- Order: Fabales
- Family: Fabaceae
- Subfamily: Faboideae
- Genus: Lupinus
- Species: L. croceus

Binomial name
- Lupinus croceus Eastw.

= Lupinus croceus =

Species of legume

Lupinus croceus is a species of lupine known by the common names saffron-flowered lupine and Mt Eddy Lupine. It is endemic to the northernmost mountains of California, clustering in the Klamath Mountains, where it grows in generally dry, rocky habitat.

== Description ==
This is an erect perennial herb growing 40–60 centimetres (16–24 in) tall. The hairy palmate leaves are made up of 5 to 9 leaflets each up to 6 centimetres (2.4 in) long. The inflorescence is a raceme of many flowers, sometimes arranged in whorls. Each flower is just over a centimeter long and bright yellow to orange in color. The fruit is a hairy legume pod up to 3.5 centimetres (1.4 in) long. The petioles are 1-3 inches long. The hairy seeds are just more than 1 inch long. Its flowering period is in the months of June, July, and August.

== Habitat and Distribution ==
Its habitat is dry woods in the counties of Siskiyou and Trinity. It is found between the elevations of 5000–8000 feet or 900–2700 meters. Its communities include, Yellow Pine Forest, Red Fir Forest, and Subalpine Forest. It was most commonly found in June and July. 51% of the time it was found it was a preserved specimen, 29% of the time it was found it was an occurrence, and 20% of the time it was a human observation.
