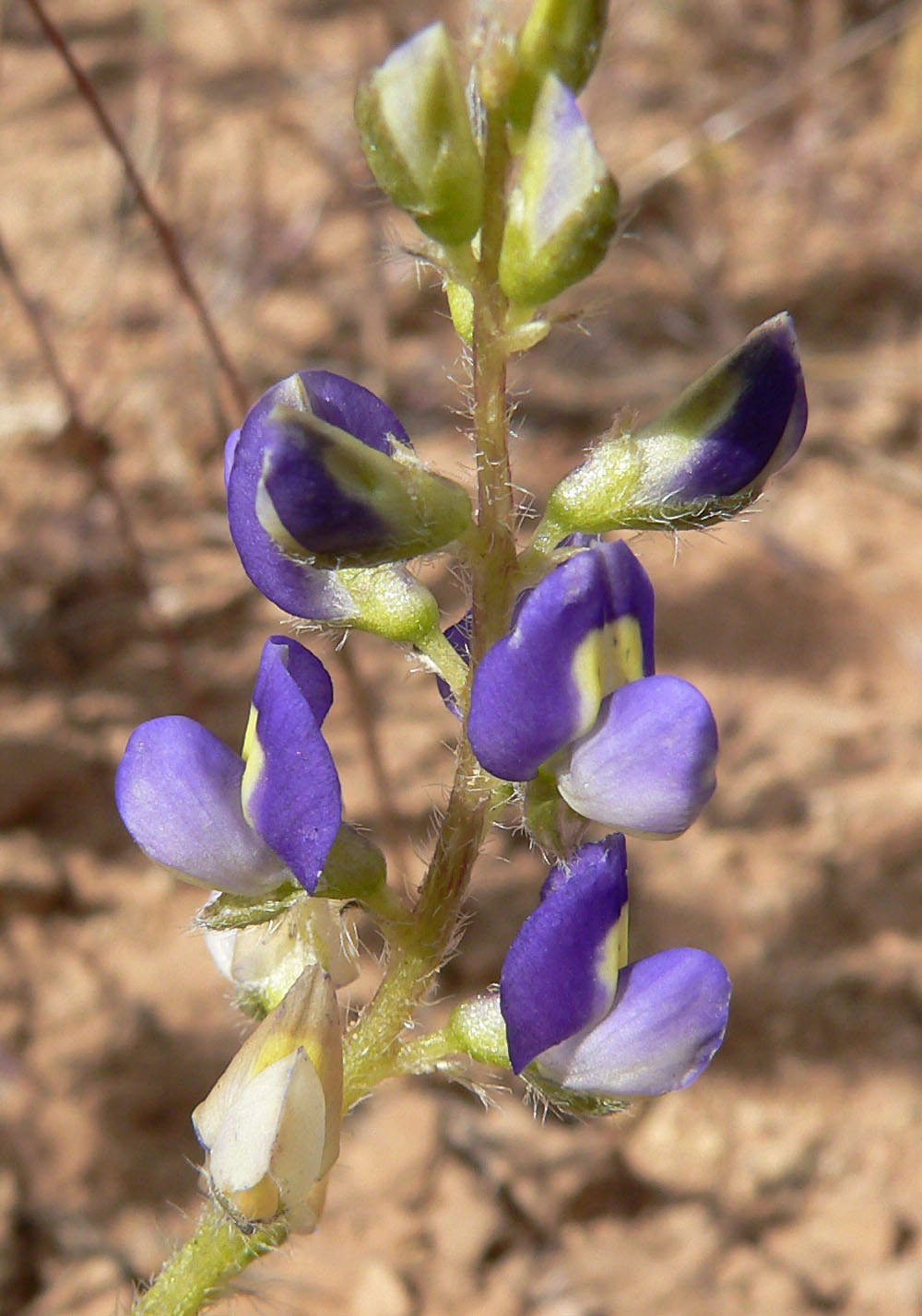

Scientific classification
- Kingdom: Plantae
- Clade: Tracheophytes
- Clade: Angiosperms
- Clade: Eudicots
- Clade: Rosids
- Order: Fabales
- Family: Fabaceae
- Subfamily: Faboideae
- Genus: Lupinus
- Species: L. flavoculatus

Binomial name
- Lupinus flavoculatus A.Heller

= Lupinus flavoculatus =

Species of legume

Lupinus flavoculatus is a species of lupine known by the common name yelloweyes, or yellow-eyed lupine.

== Distribution and habitat ==
It is endemic to California and Nevada, in mountains and plateaus of the Mojave Desert, and in the Inyo Mountains and White Mountains. The plant grows in the creosote bush scrub and pinyon-juniper woodland habitats. It can be found in Death Valley National Park.

== Description ==
Lupinus flavoculatus is a small, hairy annual herb growing up to about 20 centimetres (7.9 in) tall. Each palmate leaf is made up of 7 to 9 leaflets 1 or 2 centimeters long.

The inflorescence is a small, dense spiral of flowers each roughly a centimeter long. The flower is bright to deep blue with a yellowish spot on its banner.

The fruit is a somewhat oval-shaped hairy legume pod no more than a centimeter long. It contains one or two wrinkled seeds.
