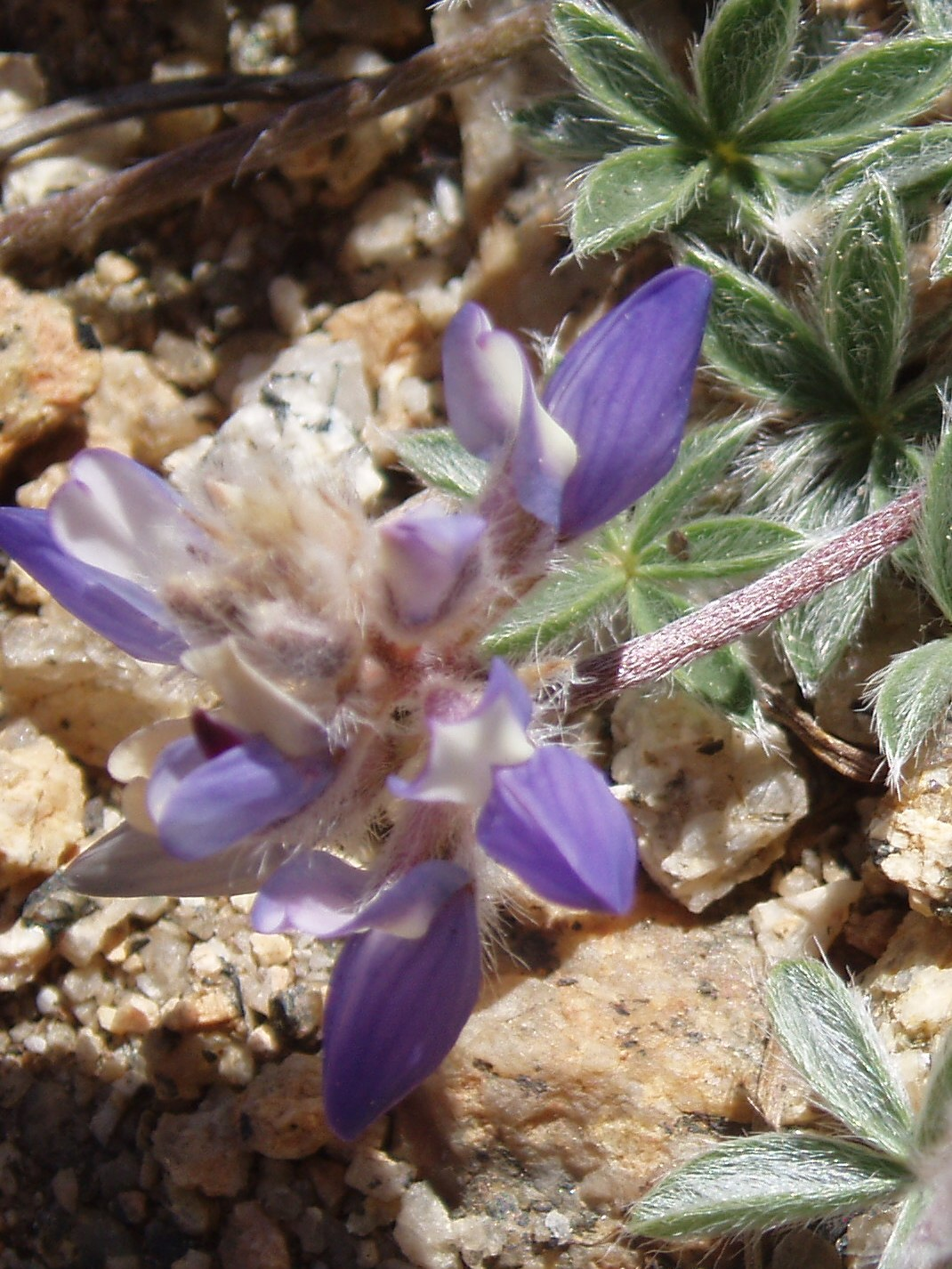

Conservation status
- Secure (NatureServe)

Scientific classification
- Kingdom: Plantae
- Clade: Tracheophytes
- Clade: Angiosperms
- Clade: Eudicots
- Clade: Rosids
- Order: Fabales
- Family: Fabaceae
- Subfamily: Faboideae
- Genus: Lupinus
- Species: L. breweri

Binomial name
- Lupinus breweri A.Gray

Varieties
- Lupinus breweri var. breweri; Lupinus breweri var. bryoides C.P.Sm.; Lupinus breweri var. grandiflorus C.P.Sm.; Lupinus breweri var. parvulus C.P.Sm.

= Lupinus breweri =

Species of flowering plant

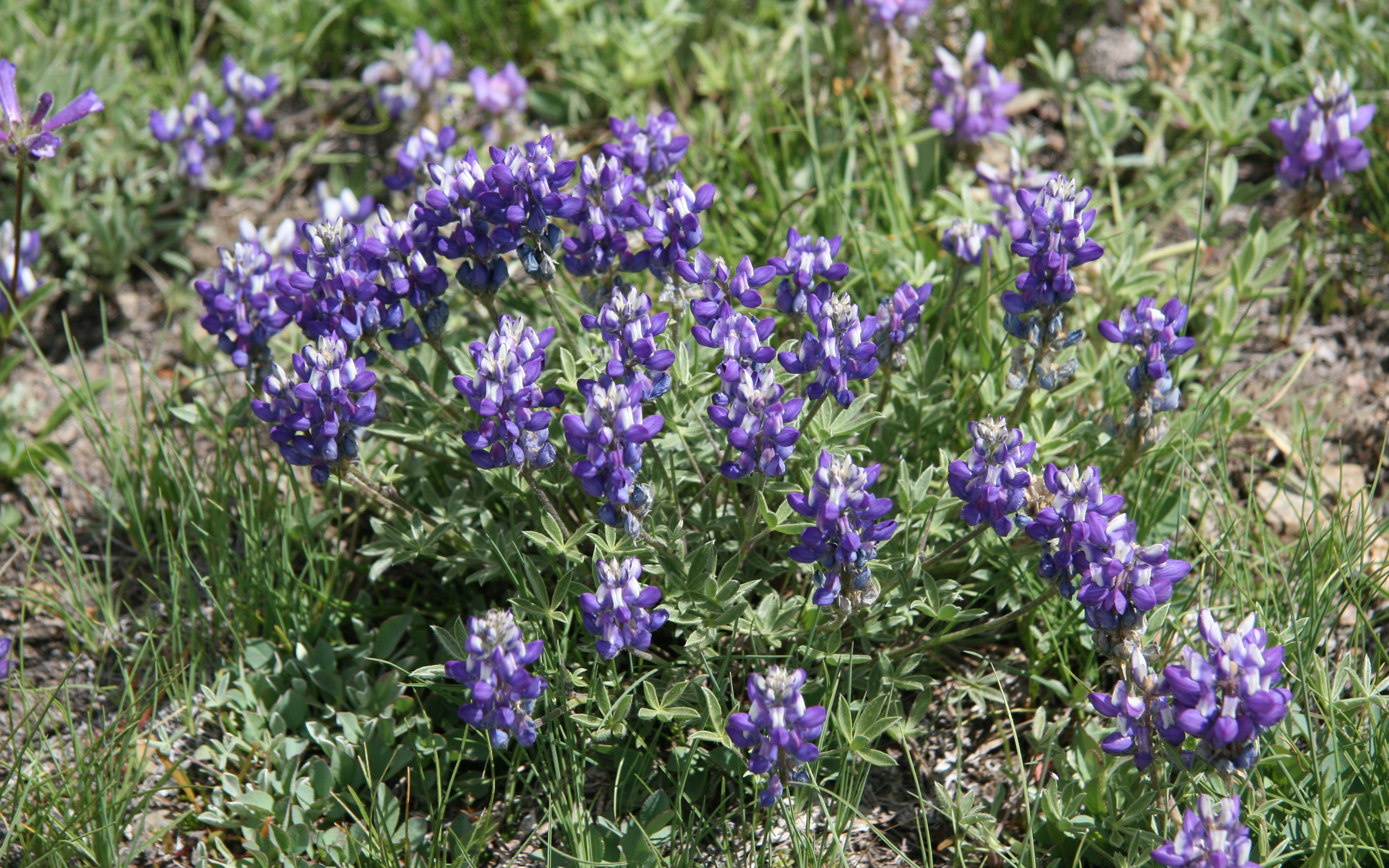
Brewers lupine plant in high meadow

Lupinus breweri is a species of lupine known by the common names Brewer's lupine and matted lupine. It is native to much of California, except for the deserts, and to adjacent sections of Oregon and Nevada, where it is common in some areas, particularly mountain forests.

== Description ==
Quite short for a lupine, this is a hairy, mat-forming perennial herb, sometimes becoming like a shrub, with a woody base. The leaves spread out from the stem. Each palmate leaf is made up of 5 to 10 woolly leaflets each up to 2 centimeters (0.79 in) long. The inflorescence is a dense raceme of flowers a few centimeters tall, each flower 4 to 11 millimeters (0.16 to 0.43 in). The flower is blue or purple with a white or yellowish spot on the banner. The fruit is a silky-hairy legume pod 1 or 2 millimeters (0.039 or 0.079 in) long.
