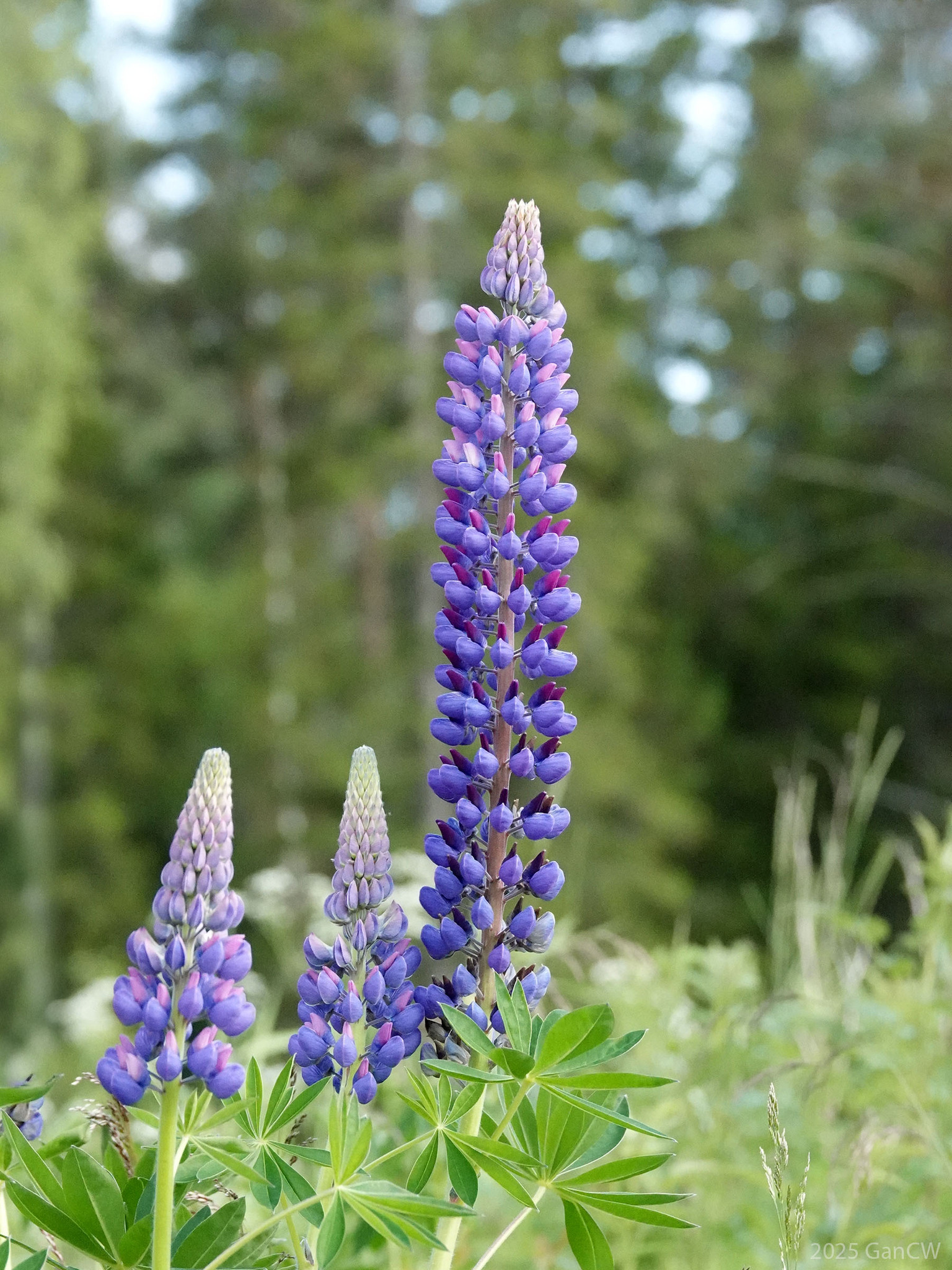
- Largeleaf lupine (L. polyphyllus)

Scientific classification
- Kingdom: Plantae
- Clade: Tracheophytes
- Clade: Angiosperms
- Clade: Eudicots
- Clade: Rosids
- Order: Fabales
- Family: Fabaceae
- Subfamily: Faboideae
- Tribe: Genisteae
- Genus: Lupinus; L.

Type species
- Lupinus albus L.

Subgenera
- Lupinus; Platycarpos (S.Wats) Kurl.

= Lupinus =

Genus of leguminous plants

Lupinus, commonly known as lupin, lupine, (Note: Both pronounced /ˈluːpɪn/; the latter spelling is prevalent in North America.) or regionally bluebonnet, is a genus of plants in the legume family Fabaceae. The genus includes over 199 species, with centres of diversity in North and South America. Smaller centres occur in North Africa and the Mediterranean. They are widely cultivated both as a food source and as ornamental plants, but are invasive to some areas. For instance, lupine has become an ecological problem in Iceland since the beginning of the 21st century.

The part of the plant which is eaten is the leguminous seed. It is nutritious, sustainable, and affordable. Because they are bitter and contain strong alkaloids, they must be pickled prior to consumption, to avoid toxicity. They can also be made into a flour and used as fertilizer. They were historically eaten in the Mediterranean, North Africa, and Latin America, but have now gained popularity in other parts of the world, such as Denmark and Belarus. In spite of lupins not being native to Australia, in the past decade it has produced 85 percent of commercially grown lupins.

There are ancient texts which refer to the utilization of lupine seeds, such as the Mishnah, and the Roman writer Pliny the Elder. Evidence of their consumption have been found in Egyptian Pharonic tombs and in the Western Galilee, Israel, with the latter dating back to hunter and gatherer Natufian cave residents.

The species are mostly herbaceous perennial plants 0.3–1.5 metres (1–5 feet) tall, but some are annual plants and a few are shrubs up to 3 m (10 ft) tall. An exception is the chamis de monte (Lupinus jaimehintonianus) of Oaxaca in Mexico, which is a tree up to 8 m (26 ft) tall.

Lupins have soft green to grey-green leaves which may be coated in silvery hairs, often densely so. The leaf blades are usually palmately divided into five to 28 leaflets, or reduced to a single leaflet in a few species of the southeastern United States and eastern South America.

The flowers are produced in dense or open whorls on an erect spike, each flower 1–2 centimetres (3/8–3/4 inch) long. The pea-like flowers have an upper standard, or banner, two lateral wings, and two lower petals fused into a keel. The flower shape has inspired common names such as bluebonnets and quaker bonnets.

The fruit is a pod containing several seeds. The seeds contain alkaloids which lend them a bitter taste.

Extrafloral nectaries have been found on a species in Arizona.

== Taxonomy ==
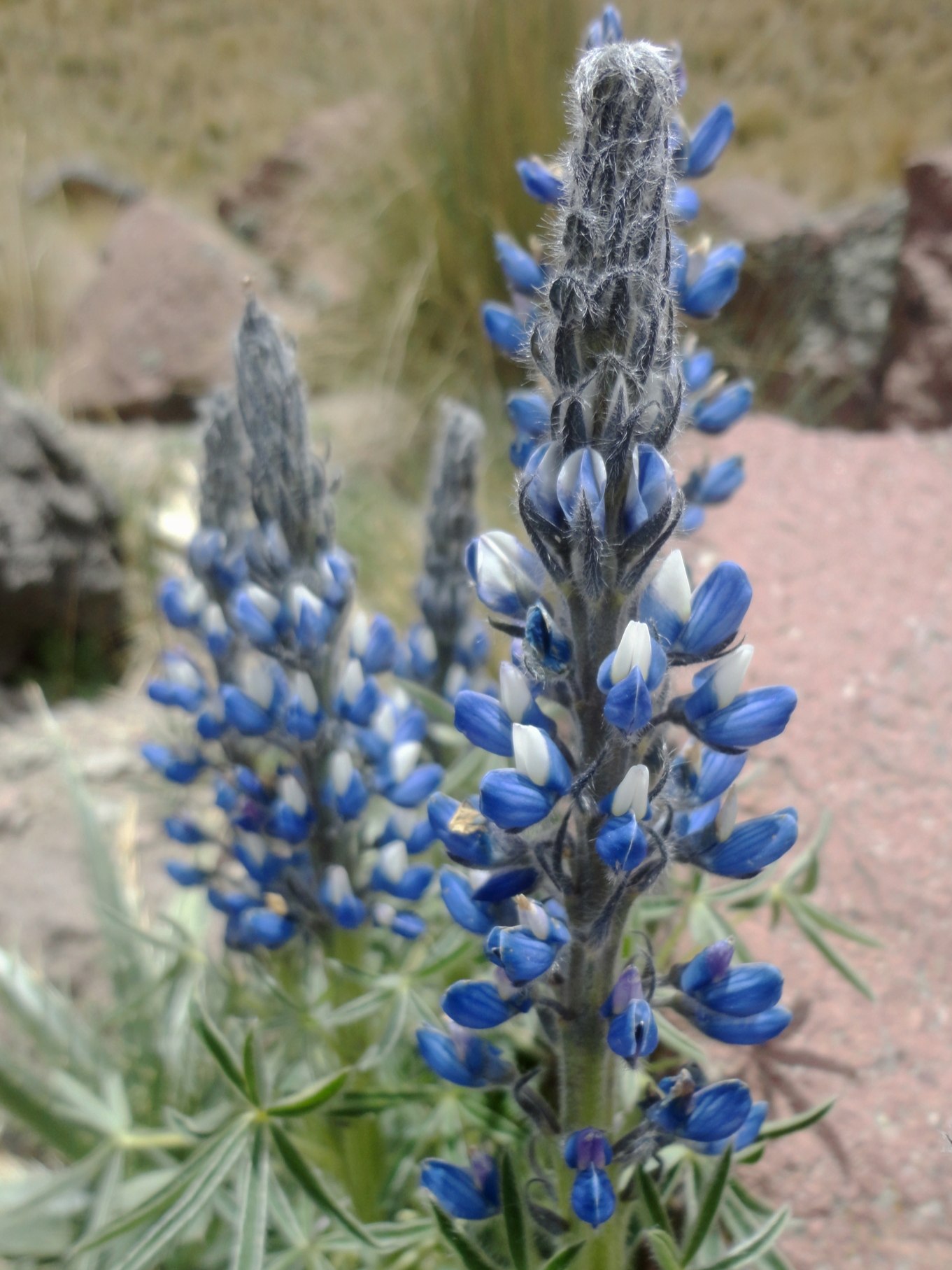
Lupinus aschenbornii, Nevado de Toluca, Mexico

The genus Lupinus L. and, in particular, its North American species were divided by Sereno Watson (1873) into three sections: Lupinus, Platycarpos, and Lupinnelus. Differences in habitat and in the number of ovules were the basis for this classification. A majority of the perennial and annual species from the American continent described by Watson were referred to Lupinus. Some annual species with two ovules in the ovary and two seeds in the pod (L. densiflorus, L. microcarpus, etc.) were attributed to the Platycarpos section. Section Lupinnelus consisted of one species (L. uncialis), with axillary and solitary flowers, scarcely reflexed banner, and also with two ovules in the ovary.

While Watson's work was predominantly based on study of North American species, the later research of Ascherson and Graebner (1907) extended his principle of classification to cover all lupins from the Eastern and Western Hemispheres, also using number of ovules (seedbuds) in the ovary (and thus of seeds in the pod) as the criterion for this division. They described two subgenera, Eulupinus and Platycarpos. Most of the described species were referred to subgen. A. Eulupinus. Subgen. B. Platycarpos included several annual species from the Eastern Hemisphere with two seedbuds and seeds in the bean (the same species, as the one specified by S. Watson).

A current schema retains this distinction, but uses the nomenclature for the subgenera of Platycarpos and Lupinus. In this schema, subgenus Platycarpos (S.Wats.) Kurl. contains perennial and annual species from the Western Hemisphere, with a minimum two or more ovules or seedbuds. Subgenus Lupinus consists of 12 species from Africa and the Mediterranean, with a minimum of four ovules or seedbuds.

The taxonomy of Lupinus has always been confusing. How many distinct species exist or how they might be organized within the genus is not clear. The plants are variable and the taxa are not always distinct from one another. Some American taxa have been described as complexes rather than separate species. Estimates of the number of lupine species generally fall between 200 and 500. One authority places the estimate at approximately 267 species worldwide. Currently, two subgenera are recognized.

=== Subgenus Platycarpos ===
The ovary contains two and more ovules or seedbuds. The seed are predominantly small-sized, with an underdeveloped embryo and small amount of endosperm. Cotyledons are small-sized, with long caulicles. The first pair of true leaves is alternate. The stem is predominantly naked with waxen coating. Dominating is the monopodial type of branching. Leaflets are smooth, with waxen coating or slight pubescence, predominantly narrow. Pods are flat or orbicular, with two or more seeds. Represented by frutcuilose, fruticose and herbaceous perennial forms, or less often annual ones. Plants are cross-pollinated. Chromosome number 2n is either 36, 48, or 96. This subgenus is distributed throughout North, Central and South America, predominantly in the mining systems of the Andes and Cordillera. Some species are cultivated (L. mutabilis, L. polyphyllus). This subgenus includes several hundred species, requiring further analysis of their authenticity.

It comprises the following species:

- Lupinus aberrans C.P. Sm.
- Lupinus abramsii C.P. Sm. – Abrams' lupine
- Lupinus acopalcus C.P. Sm.
- Lupinus adinoanthus C.P. Sm.
- Lupinus adsurgens Drew – Drew's silky lupine
- Lupinus affinis J. Agardh – fleshy lupine
- Lupinus agardhianus A. Heller
- Lupinus alaristatus C.P. Sm.
- Lupinus albert-smithianus C.P. Sm.
- Lupinus albescens Hook. & Arn. – hoary lupine
- Lupinus albicaulis Douglas – sickle-keel lupine
- Lupinus albifrons Benth. – silver bush lupine
  - var. albifrons Benth.
  - var. douglasii (J. Agardh) C. P. Sm.
  - var. hallii (Abrams) Isely
- Lupinus albopilosus A. Heller
- Lupinus albosericeus C.P. Sm.
- Lupinus alcis-montis C.P. Sm.
- Lupinus aliamandus C.P. Sm.
- Lupinus aliattenuatus C.P. Sm.
- Lupinus alibicolor C.P. Sm.
- Lupinus aliceae C.P. Sm.
- Lupinus alilatissimus C.P. Sm.
- Lupinus alinanus C.P. Sm.
- Lupinus alipatulus C.P. Sm.
- Lupinus alirevolutus C.P. Sm.
- Lupinus alivillosus C.P. Sm.
- Lupinus allargyreius C.P. Sm.
- Lupinus alopecuroides Desr.
- Lupinus alpestris A. Nelson
- Lupinus altimontanus C.P. Sm.
- Lupinus altiplani C.P. Sm.
- Lupinus amabayensis C.P. Sm.
- Lupinus amandus C.P. Sm.
- Lupinus amboensis C.P. Sm.
- Lupinus ammophilus Greene
  - var. ammophilus Greene
  - var. crassus (Payson) Isely
- Lupinus amnis-otuni C.P. Sm.
- Lupinus ampaiensis C.P. Sm.
- Lupinus amphibius Suksd.
- Lupinus ananeanus Ulbr.
- Lupinus anatolicus W. Święcicki & W. K. Święcicki
- Lupinus andersonii S. Watson – Anderson's lupine
- Lupinus andicola Gillies
- Lupinus andinus Rose ex J. F. Macbr.
- Lupinus angustiflorus Eastw. – narrowflower lupine
- Lupinus antensis C.P. Sm.
- Lupinus antiplani C. P. Sm.
- Lupinus antoninus Eastw. – Anthony Peak lupine
- Lupinus apertus A. Heller
- Lupinus appositus C.P. Sm.
- Lupinus arboreus Sims – yellow bush lupin, tree lupine
- Lupinus arbustus Lindl. – longspur lupine
  - subsp. arbustus Lindl.
  - subsp. neolaxiflorus D.B.Dunn
  - subsp. pseudoparviflorus (Rydb.) D.B.Dunn
- Lupinus arbutosocius C.P. Sm.
- Lupinus archeranus C.P. Sm.
- Lupinus arcticus S. Watson – Arctic lupine
  - subsp. arcticus S. Watson
  - subsp. subalpinus (Piper & Robinson)D.B.Dunn
- Lupinus arenarius Gardner
- Lupinus arequipensis C.P. Sm.
- Lupinus argenteus Pursh – silvery lupine
  - var. argentatus (Rydb.) Barneby
  - var. argenteus Pursh
  - var. argophyllus (A. Gray) S. Watson
  - var. depressus (Rydb.) C. L. Hitchc.
  - var. fulvomaculatus (Payson) Barneby
  - var. heteranthus (S. Watson) Barneby – Kellogg's spurred lupine
  - var. hillii (Greene) Barneby
  - var. holosericeus (Torr. & A.Gray) Barneby
  - var. montigenus (A. Heller) Barneby
  - var. palmeri (S.Watson) Barneby
  - var. rubricaulis (Greene) S. L. Welsh
  - var. utahensis (S.Watson) Barneby
- Lupinus argurocalyx C.P. Sm.
- Lupinus aridorum McFarlin ex Beckner – scrub lupine
- Lupinus aridulus C.P. Sm.
- Lupinus aridus Lindl.
- Lupinus ariste-josephii C.P. Sm.
- Lupinus arizelus C.P. Sm.
- Lupinus arizonicus (S. Watson) S. Watson
  - subsp. arizonicus (S. Watson) S. Watson – Arizona lupine
  - subsp. sonorensis Christian & D. Dunn – Sonora lupine
- Lupinus arvensi-plasketti C.P. Sm.
- Lupinus arvensis Benth.
- Lupinus asa-grayanus C.P. Sm.
- Lupinus aschenbornii S. Schauer
- Lupinus asplundianus C.P. Sm.
- Lupinus asymbepus C.P. Sm.
- Lupinus atropurpureus C.P. Sm.
- Lupinus attenuatus Gardner
- Lupinus aureonitens Hook. & Arn.
- Lupinus austrobicolor C.P. Sm.
- Lupinus austrohumifusus C.P. Sm.
- Lupinus austrorientalis C.P. Sm.
- Lupinus austrosericeus C.P. Sm.
- Lupinus ballianus C.P. Sm.
- Lupinus bandelierae C.P. Sm.
- Lupinus bangii Rusby
- Lupinus barbatilabius C.P. Sm.
- Lupinus barkeri Lindl.
- Lupinus bartlettianus C.P. Sm.
- Lupinus benthamii A. Heller
- Lupinus bi-inclinatus C.P. Sm.
- Lupinus bicolor Lindl. – miniature lupine, bicolor lupine, Lindley's annual lupine
  - subsp. bicolor Lindl.
  - subsp. microphyllus (S. Watson) D. B. Dunn
  - subsp. pipersmithii (A. Heller) D. B. Dunn
  - subsp. umbellatus (Greene) D. B. Dunn
- Lupinus bingenensis Suksd. – Bingen lupine
- Lupinus blaisdellii Eastw.
- Lupinus bogotensis Benth.
- Lupinus bolivianus C.P. Sm.
- Lupinus bombycinocarpus C.P. Sm.
- Lupinus bonplandius C.P. Sm.
- Lupinus boyacensis C.P. Sm.
- Lupinus brachypremnon C.P. Sm.
- Lupinus bracteolaris Desr.
- Lupinus brandegeei Eastw.
- Lupinus brevecuneus C.P. Sm.
- Lupinus brevicaulis S. Watson – shortstem lupine
- Lupinus brevior (Jeps.) Christian & D.B. Dunn
- Lupinus breviscapus Ulbr.
- Lupinus breweri A. Gray – Brewer's lupine
- Lupinus bryoides C.P. Sm.
- Lupinus buchtienii Rusby
- Lupinus burkartianus C.P. Sm.
- Lupinus burkei S. Watson – Burke's lupine
- Lupinus burkeri Lindl.
- Lupinus caballoanus B.L. Turner
- Lupinus cachupatensis C.P. Sm.
- Lupinus cacuminis Standl.
- Lupinus caeruleus A. Heller
- Lupinus caesius Eastw.
- Lupinus caespitosus Torr. & A. Gray – stemless dwarf lupine
- Lupinus calcensis C.P. Sm.
- Lupinus caldasensis C.P. Sm.
- Lupinus camiloanus C.P. Sm.
- Lupinus campestris Schltdl. & Cham.
- Lupinus carazensis Ulbr.
- Lupinus carchiensis C.P. Sm.
- Lupinus cardenasianus C.P. Sm.
- Lupinus carhuamayus C.P. Sm.
- Lupinus carlos-ochoae C.P. Sm.
- Lupinus carpapaticus C.P. Sm.
- Lupinus carrikeri C.P. Sm.
- Lupinus caucensis C.P. Sm.
- Lupinus cavicaulis C.P. Sm.
- Lupinus ccorilazensis Vargas ex C. P. Smith
- Lupinus celsimontanus C.P. Sm.
- Lupinus cervinus Kellogg – Santa Lucia lupine
- Lupinus cesar-vargasii C.P. Sm.
- Lupinus cesaranus C.P. Sm.
- Lupinus chachas C.P. Sm.
- Lupinus chamissonis Eschsch. – Chamisso bush lupine
- Lupinus chavanillensis (J.F. Macbr.) C.P. Sm.
- Lupinus chipaquensis C.P. Sm.
- Lupinus chlorolepis C.P. Sm.
- Lupinus chocontensis C.P. Sm.
- Lupinus chongos-bajous C.P. Sm.
- Lupinus christinae A. Heller
- Lupinus chrysanthus Ulbr.
- Lupinus chrysocalyx C.P. Sm.
- Lupinus chumbivilcensis C.P. Sm.
- Lupinus citrinus Kellogg – orange lupine
- Lupinus clarkei Oerst.
- Lupinus cochapatensis C.P. Sm.
- Lupinus colcabambensis C.P. Sm.
- Lupinus collinus (Greene) A. Heller
- Lupinus colombiensis C.P. Sm.
- Lupinus compactiflorus Rose
- Lupinus comptus Benth.
- Lupinus concinnus J. Agardh
  - subsp. concinnus J. Agardh
  - subsp. orcuttii (S.Watson) D.B.Dunn
- Lupinus condensiflorus C.P. Sm.
- Lupinus confertus Kellogg
- Lupinus congdonii (C.P. Sm.) D.B. Dunn
- Lupinus conicus C.P. Sm.
- Lupinus constancei T.W. Nelson & J.P. Nelson – Lassics lupine
- Lupinus convencionensis C.P. Sm.
- Lupinus cookianus C.P. Sm.
- Lupinus coriaceus Benth.
- Lupinus costaricensis D.B. Dunn
- Lupinus cotopaxiensis C.P. Sm.
- Lupinus couthouyanus C.P. Sm.
- Lupinus covillei Greene – shaggy lupine
- Lupinus crassulus Greene
- Lupinus crassus Payson
- Lupinus croceus Eastw. – saffron-flowered lupine
- Lupinus crotalarioides Benth.
- Lupinus crucis-viridis C.P. Sm.
- Lupinus cuatrecasasii C.P. Sm.
- Lupinus culbertsonii Greene
  - subsp. culbertsonii Greene
  - subsp. hypolasius (Greene) B.J.Cox
- Lupinus cumulicola Small
- Lupinus cusickii S. Watson
  - subsp. abortivus (Greene) B.J.Cox
  - subsp. brachypodus (Piper) B.J.Cox
  - subsp. cusickii S. Watson
- Lupinus cuspidatus Rusby
- Lupinus cuzcensis C.P. Sm.
- Lupinus cymboides C.P. Sm.
- Lupinus czermakii Briq. & Hochr.
- Lupinus dalesiae Eastw. – Quincy lupine
- Lupinus decemplex C.P. Sm.
- Lupinus decurrens Gardner
- Lupinus deflexus Congdon
- Lupinus delicatulus Sprague & Riley
- Lupinus densiflorus Benth. – dense-flowered lupin
  - subsp. densiflorus Benth.
  - subsp. lacteus (Kellogg) R.M.Beauch.
- Lupinus depressus Rydb.
- Lupinus diasemus C.P. Sm.
- Lupinus diehlii M.E. Jones
- Lupinus diffusus Nutt. – spreading lupine, Oak Ridge lupine, sky-blue lupine
- Lupinus disjunctus C.P. Sm.
- Lupinus diversalpicola C.P. Sm.
- Lupinus dorae C.P. Sm.
- Lupinus dotatus C.P. Sm.
- Lupinus duranii Eastw. – Mono Lake lupine
- Lupinus dusenianus C.P. Sm.
- Lupinus eanophyllus C.P. Sm.
- Lupinus edysomatus C.P. Sm.
- Lupinus egens C.P. Sm.
- Lupinus elaphoglossum Barneby
- Lupinus elatus I.M. Johnst. – tall silky lupine
- Lupinus elegans Kunth – elegant lupine
- Lupinus elegantulus Eastw.
- Lupinus ellsworthianus C.P. Sm.
- Lupinus elmeri Greene – Elmer's lupine
- Lupinus eramosus C.P. Sm.
- Lupinus erectifolius C.P. Sm.
- Lupinus eremonomus C.P. Sm.
- Lupinus eriocalyx (C.P. Sm.) C.P. Sm.
- Lupinus eriocladus Ulbr.
- Lupinus evermannii Rydb.
- Lupinus espinarensis C.P. Sm.
- Lupinus exaltatus Zucc.
- Lupinus excubitus M.E. Jones – grape soda lupine
  - subsp. austromontanus (A.Heller) R.M.Beauch.
  - subsp. excubitus M.E. Jones
- Lupinus exochus C.P. Sm.
- Lupinus expetendus C.P. Sm.
- Lupinus extrarius C.P. Sm.
- Lupinus falsomutabilis C.P. Sm.
- Lupinus falsoprostratus C.P. Sm.
- Lupinus falsorevolutus C.P. Sm.
- Lupinus famelicus C.P. Sm.
- Lupinus fiebrigianus Ulbr.
- Lupinus fieldii J.F. Macbr.
- Lupinus fissicalyx A. Heller
- Lupinus flavoculatus A. Heller
- Lupinus foliolosus Benth.
- Lupinus formosus Greene – summer lupine
  - var. bridgesii (S.Watson) Greene
  - var. formosus Greene
- Lupinus fragrans A. Heller
- Lupinus francis-whittieri C.P. Sm.
- Lupinus fratrum C.P. Sm.
- Lupinus fulcratus Greene
- Lupinus gachetensis C.P. Sm.
- Lupinus garfieldensis C.P. Sm.
- Lupinus gaudichaudianus C.P. Sm.
- Lupinus gayanus C.P. Sm.
- Lupinus gentryanus C.P. Sm.
- Lupinus geophilus Rose
- Lupinus gibertianus C.P. Sm.
- Lupinus giganteus Rose
- Lupinus glabratus J. Agardh
- Lupinus goodspeedii J.F. Macbr.
- Lupinus gormanii Piper
- Lupinus gracilentus Greene
- Lupinus grayi S. Watson – Sierra lupine
- Lupinus grauensis C.P. Sm.
- Lupinus grisebachianus C.P. Sm.
- Lupinus guadalupensis C.P. Sm. – Guadalupe Island lupine
- Lupinus guaraniticus (Hassl.) C.P. Sm.
- Lupinus guascensis C.P. Sm.
- Lupinus guggenheimianus Rusby
- Lupinus hamaticalyx C.P. Sm.
- Lupinus hartmannii C.P. Sm.
- Lupinus hartwegii Lindl.
- Lupinus haughtianus C.P. Sm.
- Lupinus hautcarazensis C.P. Sm.
- Lupinus havardii S. Watson
- Lupinus hazenanus C.P. Sm.
- Lupinus hendersonii Eastw.
- Lupinus heptaphyllus (Vell.) Hassl.
- Lupinus herreranus C.P. Sm.
- Lupinus herzogii Ulbr.
- Lupinus hieronymii C.P. Sm.
- Lupinus hilarianus Benth.
- Lupinus hillii Greene
- Lupinus hinkleyorum C.P. Sm.
- Lupinus hintoniorum B.L. Turner
- Lupinus hirsutissimus Benth. – stinging lupine
- Lupinus holmgrenianus C.P. Sm. – Holmgren's lupine
- Lupinus honoratus C.P. Sm.
- Lupinus horizontalis A. Heller
- Lupinus hornemanni J. Agardh
- Lupinus hortonianus C.P. Sm.
- Lupinus hortorum C.P. Sm.
- Lupinus howard-scottii C.P. Sm.
- Lupinus howardii M.E. Jones
- Lupinus huachucanus M.E. Jones
- Lupinus huancayoensis C.P. Sm.
- Lupinus huariacus C.P. Sm.
- Lupinus huaronensis J.F. Macbr.
- Lupinus huigrensis Rose ex C. P. Sm.
- Lupinus humifusus Sessé & Moc. ex G. Don
- Lupinus hyacinthinus C.F. Baker – San Jacinto lupine
- Lupinus hybridus Lem.
- Lupinus ignobilis C.P. Sm.
- Lupinus imminutus C.P. Sm.
- Lupinus indigoticus Eastw.
- Lupinus inflatus C.P. Sm.
- Lupinus insignis C.P. Sm.
- Lupinus insulae C.P. Sm.
- Lupinus interruptus Benth.
- Lupinus intortus C.P. Sm.
- Lupinus inusitatus C.P. Sm.
- Lupinus involutus C.P. Sm.
- Lupinus inyoensis A. Heller
- Lupinus isabelianus Eastw.
- Lupinus jahnii Rose ex Pittier
- Lupinus jaimehintoniana B.L. Turner
- Lupinus james-westii C.P. Sm.
- Lupinus jean-julesii C.P. Sm.
- Lupinus jelskianus C.P. Sm.
- Lupinus johannis-howellii C.P. Sm.
- Lupinus jonesii Rydb.
- Lupinus jujuyensis C.P. Sm.
- Lupinus juninensis C.P. Sm.
- Lupinus kalenbornorum C.P. Sm.
- Lupinus kellermanianus C.P. Sm.
- Lupinus kerrii Eastw.
- Lupinus killipianus C.P. Sm.
- Lupinus kingii S. Watson
- Lupinus klamathensis Eastw.
- Lupinus kunthii J. Agardh
- Lupinus kuschei Eastw. – Yukon lupine
- Lupinus lacus C.P. Sm.
- Lupinus laetus Wooton & Standl.
- Lupinus laevigatus Benth.
- Lupinus lagunae-negrae C.P. Sm.
- Lupinus lanatocarpus C.P. Sm.
- Lupinus lanatus Benth.
- Lupinus lapidicola A. Heller – Mt. Eddy lupine
- Lupinus latifolius J. Agardh
  - subsp. dudleyi (C.P.Sm.) P.Kenney & D.B.Dunn
  - subsp. latifolius J. Agardh
    - var. latifolius J. Agardh – broadleaf lupine
    - var. barbatus – Klamath lupine, bearded lupine
  - subsp. leucanthus (Rydb.)P.Kenney & D.B.Dunn
  - subsp. longipes (Greene) P.Kenney & D.B.Dunn
  - subsp. parishii (C.P.Sm.) P.Kenney & D.B.Dunn
  - subsp. viridifolius (A.Heller) P.Kenney & D.B.Dunn
- Lupinus laudandrus C.P. Sm.
- Lupinus lechlerianus C.P. Sm.
- Lupinus ledigianus C.P. Sm.
- Lupinus lelandsmithii Eastw.
- Lupinus lemmonii C.P. Sm.
- Lupinus lepidus Lindl. – prairie lupine
  - var. aridus (Douglas) Jeps.
  - var. confertus (Kellogg) C. P. Sm.
  - var. lepidus Lindl.
  - var. lobbii (A. Gray ex S. Watson) C. L. Hitchc.
  - var. sellulus (Kellogg) Barneby
  - var. utahensis (S. Watson) C. L. Hitchc.
- Lupinus leptocarpus Benth.
- Lupinus leptophyllus Cham. & Schltdl.
- Lupinus lespedezoides C.P. Sm.
- Lupinus leucophyllus Lindl. – woolly-leaf lupine
- Lupinus lilacinus A. Heller
- Lupinus lindenianus C.P. Sm.
- Lupinus lindleyanus J. Agardh
- Lupinus linearis Desr.
- Lupinus littoralis Lindl. – seashore lupine
- Lupinus lobbianus C.P. Sm.
- Lupinus longifolius (S. Watson) Abrams – longleaf bush lupine
- Lupinus lorenzensis C.P. Sm.
- Lupinus ludovicianus Greene – San Luis Obispo County Lupine
- Lupinus luetzelburgianus C.P. Sm.
- Lupinus luteolus Kellogg – butter lupine, pale yellow lupine
- Lupinus lutescens C.P. Sm.
- Lupinus lutosus A. Heller
- Lupinus lyallii A. Gray
  - subsp. alcis-temporis (C.P. Sm.) B.J.Cox
  - subsp. lyallii A. Gray – Lyall's lupine
  - subsp. minutifolius (Eastw.) B.J.Cox
  - subsp. washoensis (A.Heller) B.J.Cox
- Lupinus macbrideanus C.P. Sm.
- Lupinus macranthus Rose
- Lupinus maculatus Rydb.
- Lupinus madrensis Seem.
- Lupinus magdalenensis C.P. Sm.
- Lupinus magnificus M.E. Jones
- Lupinus magniflorus C.P. Sm.
- Lupinus magnistipulatus Planchuelo & D.B. Dunn
- Lupinus malacophyllus Greene
- Lupinus malacotrichus C.P. Sm.
- Lupinus maleopinatus C.P. Sm.
- Lupinus mandonanus C.P. Sm.
- Lupinus mantaroensis C.P. Sm.
- Lupinus marinensis Eastw.
- Lupinus mariposanus Eastw.
- Lupinus martensis C.P. Sm.
- Lupinus martinetianus (C.P. Sm.) C.P. Sm.
- Lupinus mathewsianus C.P. Sm.
- Lupinus matucanicus Ulbr.
- Lupinus meionanthus A. Gray
- Lupinus melaphyllus C.P. Sm.
- Lupinus menziesii J. Agardh
- Lupinus meridanus C.P. Sm.
- Lupinus metensis C.P. Sm.
- Lupinus mexicanus Lag.
- Lupinus michelianus C. P. Sm.
- Lupinus microcarpus Sims
  - var. densiflorus
  - var. microcarpus – wide-bannered lupin, chick lupin
- Lupinus microphyllus Desr.
- Lupinus minimus Hook.
- Lupinus mirabilis C.P. Sm.
- Lupinus misticola Ulbr.
- Lupinus mollendoensis Ulbr.
- Lupinus mollis A. Heller
- Lupinus monensis Eastw.
- Lupinus monserratensis C.P. Sm.
- Lupinus montanus Kunth
  - subsp. glabrior (S.Watson) D.B.Dunn & Harmon
  - subsp. montanus Kunth
  - subsp. montesii (C.P.Sm.) D.B.Dunn & Harmon
- Lupinus monticola Rydb.
- Lupinus montigenus A. Heller
- Lupinus moritzianus Kunth
- Lupinus mucronulatus Howell
- Lupinus muelleri Standl.
- Lupinus multiflorus Desr.
- Lupinus munzianus C.P. Sm.
- Lupinus munzii Eastw.
- Lupinus mutabilis Sweet – Andean lupin, pearl lupin, South American lupin, tarwi, tarhui, chocho
- Lupinus nanus Benth. – dwarf lupin, field lupin, sky lupin, Douglas' annual lupin
- Lupinus navicularius A. Heller
- Lupinus nehmadae C.P. Sm.
- Lupinus neocotus C.P. Sm.
- Lupinus neomexicanus Greene
- Lupinus nepubescens C.P. Sm.
- Lupinus nevadensis A. Heller – Nevada lupine
- Lupinus niederleinianus C.P. Sm.
- Lupinus nipomensis Eastw. – Nipomo Mesa lupine
- Lupinus niveus S. Watson
- Lupinus nonoensis C.P. Sm.
- Lupinus nootkatensis Sims – Nootka lupin
- Lupinus notabilis C.P. Sm.
- Lupinus nubigenus Kunth
- Lupinus nubilorum C.P. Sm.
- Lupinus obscurus C.P. Sm.
- Lupinus obtusilobus A. Heller – bluntlobe lupine
- Lupinus ochoanus C.P. Sm.
- Lupinus ochroleucus Eastw.
- Lupinus odoratus A. Heller – royal Mojave lupin
- Lupinus onustus S. Watson – Plumas lupine
- Lupinus opertospicus C.P. Sm.
- Lupinus oquendoanus C.P. Sm.
- Lupinus oreganus A. Heller – Oregon lupin
- Lupinus oreophilus Phil.
- Lupinus ornatus Lindl.
- Lupinus oscar-haughtii C.P. Sm.
- Lupinus ostiofluminis C.P. Sm.
- Lupinus otto-buchtienii C.P. Sm.
- Lupinus otto-kuntzeanus C.P. Sm.
- Lupinus otuzcoensis C.P. Sm.
- Lupinus ovalifolius Benth.
- Lupinus pachanoanus C.P. Sm.
- Lupinus pachitensis C.P. Sm.
- Lupinus pachylobus Greene
- Lupinus padre-crowleyi C.P. Sm. – DeDecker's lupine, Father Crowley's lupine
- Lupinus pallidus Brandegee
- Lupinus paniculatus Desr.
- Lupinus paraguariensis Chodat & Hassl.
- Lupinus paranensis C.P. Sm.
- Lupinus paruroensis C.P. Sm.
- Lupinus parviflorus Hook. & Arn. – lodgepole lupin
  - subsp. myrianthus (Greene) Harmon
  - subsp. parviflorus Hook. & Arn.
- Lupinus parvifolius Gardner
- Lupinus pasachoensis C.P. Sm.
- Lupinus pasadenensis Eastw.
- Lupinus patulus C.P. Sm.
- Lupinus paucartambensis C.P. Sm.
- Lupinus paucovillosus C.P. Sm.
- Lupinus paynei Davidson
- Lupinus pearceanus C.P. Sm.
- Lupinus pendentiflorus C.P. Sm.
- Lupinus peirsonii H. Mason – Peirson's lupine, long lupine
- Lupinus penlandianus C.P. Sm.
- Lupinus perblandus C.P. Sm.
- Lupinus perbonus C.P. Sm.
- Lupinus perennis L. – wild perennial lupine, sundial lupine, Indian beet, old maid's bonnets
  - subsp. gracilis (Nutt.) D.B.Dunn
  - subsp. occidentalis S. Watson
  - subsp. perennis L.
- Lupinus perglaber Eastw.
- Lupinus perissophytus C.P. Sm.
- Lupinus persistens Rose
- Lupinus peruvianus Ulbr.
- Lupinus philippianus C.P. Sm.
- Lupinus physodes Douglas
- Lupinus pickeringii A. Gray
- Lupinus pilosellus Eastw.
- Lupinus pilosissimus M. Martens & Galeotti
- Lupinus pinguis Ulbr.
- Lupinus pipersmithianus J.F. Macbr.
- Lupinus pisacensis C.P. Sm.
- Lupinus piurensis C.P. Sm.
- Lupinus platamodes C.P. Sm.
- Lupinus plattensis S. Watson
- Lupinus platyptenus C.P. Sm.
- Lupinus polycarpus Greene – smallflower lupin
- Lupinus polyphyllus Lindl. – largeleaf lupine, bigleaf lupine, garden lupin, many-leaved lupine
  - var. burkei (S. Watson) C. L. Hitchc.
  - var. humicola (A.Nelson) Barneby
  - var. pallidipes (A. Heller) C. P. Sm.
  - var. polyphyllus Lindl.
  - var. prunophilus (M. E. Jones) L. Ll. Phillips
- Lupinus poopoensis C.P. Sm.
- Lupinus popayanensis C.P. Sm.
- Lupinus potosinus Rose
- Lupinus praealtus C.P. Sm.
- Lupinus praestabilis C.P. Sm.
- Lupinus praetermissus C.P. Sm.
- Lupinus pratensis A.Heller – Inyo Meadow lupine
- Lupinus pringlei Rose
- Lupinus proculaustrinus C.P. Sm.
- Lupinus prostratus J. Agardh
- Lupinus protrusus C.P. Sm.
- Lupinus prouvensalanus C.P. Sm.
- Lupinus prunophilus M.E. Jones – hairy bigleaf lupin
- Lupinus pseudopolyphyllus C.P. Sm.
- Lupinus pseudotsugoides C.P. Sm.
- Lupinus pubescens Benth.
- Lupinus pucapucensis C.P. Sm.
- Lupinus pulloviridus C.P. Sm.
- Lupinus pulvinaris Ulbr.
- Lupinus punto-reyesensis C.P. Sm.
- Lupinus puracensis C.P. Sm.
- Lupinus purdieanus C.P. Sm.
- Lupinus pureriae C.P. Sm.
- Lupinus purosericeus C.P. Sm.
- Lupinus pusillus Pursh – rusty lupine or dwarf lupine
  - subsp. intermontanus (A.Heller) D.B.Dunn
  - subsp. pusillus Pursh
- Lupinus puyupatensis C.P. Sm.
- Lupinus pycnostachys C.P. Sm.
- Lupinus quellomayus C.P. Sm.
- Lupinus quitensis C.P. Sm.
- Lupinus radiatus C.P. Sm.
- Lupinus ramosissimus Benth.
- Lupinus reflexus Rose
- Lupinus regalis Bergmans
- Lupinus regnellianus C.P. Sm.
- Lupinus reineckianus C.P. Sm.
- Lupinus reitzii Burkart ex M. Pinheiro & Miotto
- Lupinus retrorsus L.F. Hend.
- Lupinus revolutus C.P. Sm.
- Lupinus richardianus C.P. Sm.
- Lupinus rimae Eastw.
- Lupinus rivularis Lindl. – riverbank lupin
- Lupinus romasanus Ulbr.
- Lupinus roseolus Rydb.
- Lupinus roseorum C.P. Sm.
- Lupinus rotundiflorus M.E. Jones
- Lupinus rowleeanus C.P. Sm.
- Lupinus ruber A. Heller
- Lupinus rubriflorus Planchuelo
- Lupinus ruizensis C.P. Sm.
- Lupinus rupestris Kunth
- Lupinus rusbyanus C.P. Sm.
- Lupinus russellianus C.P. Sm.
- Lupinus sabinianus Lindl.
- Lupinus sabinii Hook.
- Lupinus sabulosus A. Heller
- Lupinus salticola Eastw.
- Lupinus sandiensis C.P. Sm.
- Lupinus santanderensis C.P. Sm.
- Lupinus sarmentosus Desr.
- Lupinus saxatilis Ulbr.
- Lupinus saxosus Howell – rock lupine
- Lupinus schwackeanus C.P. Sm.
- Lupinus seifrizianus (C.P. Sm.) C.P. Sm.
- Lupinus sellowianus Harms
- Lupinus sellulus Kellogg
  - var. lobbii (S.Watson) B.J.Cox
  - var. sellulus Kellogg
  - var. ursinus (Eastw.) B.J.Cox
- Lupinus semiprostratus C.P. Sm.
- Lupinus semperflorens Benth.
- Lupinus sericatus Kellogg – Cobb Mountain lupine
- Lupinus sericeus Pursh – Pursh's silky lupin
  - var. barbiger (S.Watson) S.L.Welsh
  - var. sericeus Pursh
- Lupinus setifolius Planchuelo & D.B. Dunn
- Lupinus shastensis Lupinus albicaulis
- Lupinus shockleyi S. Watson – purple desert lupine
- Lupinus sierrae-blancae Wooton & Standl.
  - subsp. aquilinus (Wooton & Standl.) L.S.Fleak & D.B.Dunn
  - subsp. sierrae-blancae Wooton & Standl.
- Lupinus simonsianus C.P. Sm.
- Lupinus simulans Rose
- Lupinus sinaloensis C.P. Sm.
- Lupinus sitgreavesii S. Watson
- Lupinus smithianus Kunth
- Lupinus solanagrorum C.P. Sm.
- Lupinus sonomensis A. Heller
- Lupinus soratensis Rusby
- Lupinus soukupianus C. P. Smith ex J. F. Macbr.
- Lupinus sparsiflorus Benth. – desert lupin, Coulter's lupin, Mojave lupin
- Lupinus spectabilis Hoover – shaggyhair lupine
- Lupinus splendens Rose
- Lupinus spragueanus C.P. Sm.
- Lupinus staffordiae C.P. Sm.
- Lupinus stipulatus J. Agardh
- Lupinus stiversii Kellogg – harlequin annual lupine
- Lupinus storkianus C.P. Sm.
- Lupinus subacaulis Griseb.
- Lupinus subcarnosus Hook. – buffalo clover
- Lupinus subcuneatus C.P. Sm.
- Lupinus subhamatus C.P. Sm.
- Lupinus subinflatus C.P. Sm.
- Lupinus sublanatus Eastw.
- Lupinus submontanus Rose
- Lupinus subsessilis Benth.
- Lupinus subtomentosus C.P. Sm.
- Lupinus subvexus C.P. Sm.
- Lupinus succulentus K. Koch – succulent lupin, arroyo lupin, hollowleaf annual lupin
- Lupinus sufferrugineus Rusby
- Lupinus suksdorfii Robinson
- Lupinus sulfureus Douglas
  - subsp. kincaidii (Suksd.) L. Ll. Phillips – Kincaid's lupin
  - subsp. subsaccatus (Suksd.) L. Ll. Phillips
  - subsp. sulfureus Douglas – sulfur lupin, sulfur-flowered lupin
- Lupinus surcoensis C.P. Sm.
- Lupinus syriggedes C.P. Sm.
- Lupinus tacitus C.P. Sm.
- Lupinus tafiensis C.P. Sm.
- Lupinus talahuensis C.P. Sm.
- Lupinus tamayoanus C.P. Sm.
- Lupinus tarapacensis C.P. Sm.
- Lupinus tarijensis Ulbr.
- Lupinus tarmaensis C.P. Sm.
- Lupinus tatei Rusby
- Lupinus taurimortuus C.P. Sm.
- Lupinus tauris Benth.
- Lupinus tayacajensis C.P. Sm.
- Lupinus tegeticulatus Eastw.
- Lupinus tetracercophorus C.P. Sm.
- Lupinus texanus Hook.
- Lupinus texensis Hook. – Texas bluebonnet
- Lupinus thompsonianus C.P. Sm.
- Lupinus tidestromii Greene – Tidestrøm's lupin
  - var. layneae (Eastw.) Munz
  - var. tidestromii Greene
- Lupinus tolimensis C.P. Sm.
- Lupinus tomentosus DC.
- Lupinus tominensis Wedd.
- Lupinus toratensis C.P. Sm. – warwanzo, lito
- Lupinus tracyi Eastw. – Tracy's lupine
- Lupinus triananus C.P. Sm.
- Lupinus truncatus Hook. & Arn. – collared annual lupine
- Lupinus tucumanensis C.P. Sm.
- Lupinus ulbrichianus C.P. Sm.
- Lupinus uleanus C.P. Sm.
- Lupinus ultramontanus C.P. Sm.
- Lupinus umidicola C.P. Sm.
- Lupinus uncialis S. Watson
- Lupinus uncinatus Schltdl.
- Lupinus urcoensis C.P. Sm.
- Lupinus urubambensis C.P. Sm.
- Lupinus valerioi Standl.
- Lupinus vallicola A. Heller – open lupin
  - subsp. apricus (Greene) D.B.Dunn
  - subsp. vallicola A. Heller
- Lupinus vargasianus C.P. Sm.
- Lupinus varicaulis C.P. Sm.
- Lupinus variicolor Steud. – varied lupin
- Lupinus velillensis C.P. Sm.
- Lupinus velutinus Benth.
- Lupinus venezuelensis C.P. Sm.
- Lupinus ventosus C.P. Sm.
- Lupinus verbasciformis Sandwith
- Lupinus verjonensis C.P. Sm.
- Lupinus vernicius Rose
- Lupinus viduus C.P. Sm.
- Lupinus vilcabambensis C.P. Sm.
- Lupinus villosus Willd.
- Lupinus visoensis J.F. Macbr.
- Lupinus volubilis C.P. Sm.
- Lupinus weberbaueri Ulbr.
- Lupinus werdermannianus C.P. Sm.
- Lupinus westianus Small
  - var. aridorum (McFarlin ex Beckner) Isely
  - var. westianus Small
- Lupinus whiltoniae Eastw.
- Lupinus wilkesianus C.P. Sm.
- Lupinus williamlobbii C.P. Sm.
- Lupinus williamsianus C.P. Sm.
- Lupinus xanthophyllus C.P. Sm.
- Lupinus xenophytus C.P. Sm.
- Lupinus yanahuancensis C.P. Sm.
- Lupinus yarushensis C.P. Sm.
- Lupinus ynesiae C.P. Sm.

=== Subgenus Lupinus ===
In its current circumscription, subgenus Lupinus includes 12 species from the Mediterranean region and Africa with at least four ovules or seedbuds in the ovary:

- Lupinus albus L. 1753 – white lupine
  - subsp. albus L.
  - subsp. graecus (Boiss. & Spruner) Franco & P.Silva
  - subsp. termis (Forsk.) Ponert.
- Lupinus angustifolius L. 1753 – blue lupin, narrow-leafed lupin
  - var. angustifolius L.
  - var. albopunctatus Kurl. et Stankev.
  - var. griseomaculatus Kurl. et Stankev.
  - var. chalybens Kurl. et Stankev.
  - var. corylinus Kurl. et Stankev.
  - var. purpureus Kurl. et Stankev.
  - var. rubidus Kurl. et Stankev.
  - var. atabekovae Kurl. et Stankev.
  - var. sparsiusculus Kurl. et Stankev.
  - var. brunneus Kurl. et Stankev.
  - var. albosyringeus Taran.
  - var. albidus Kurl. et Stankev.
  - var. candidus Kuptzov. et Kurl.
- Lupinus atlanticus Gladstones 1974
- Lupinus cosentinii Guss. 1828 – sandplain lupin
- Lupinus digitatus Forsk. 1775
- Lupinus hispanicus Boiss. & Reut. 1842
  - subsp. bicolor (Merino) Gladst.
  - subsp. hispanicus Boiss. & Reut.
- Lupinus luteus L. 1753 – yellow lupin
  - var. luteus L.
  - var. maculosus Kurl. et Stankev.
  - var. kazimierskii Kurl. et Stankev.
  - var. arcellus Kurl. et Stankev.
  - var. sempolovskii (Atab) Kurl. et Stankev.
  - var. melanospermus Kurl. et Stankev.
  - var. niger Kurl. et Stankev.
  - var. cremeus Kurl. et Stankev.
  - var. leucospermus Kurl. et Stankev.
  - var. sulfureus (Atab.) Kurl. et Stankev.
  - var. stepanovae Kurl. et Stankev.
  - var. ochroleucus Kurl. et Stankev.
  - var. aurantiacus Kurl. et Stankev.
  - var. croceus Kurl. et Stankev.
  - var. aureus Kurl. et Stankev.
  - var. albicans Kurl. et Stankev.
  - var. sinskayae Kurl. et Stankev.
- Lupinus micranthus Guss. 1828
- Lupinus palaestinus Boiss. 1849 – white-grey lupine
- Lupinus pilosus Murr. 1774 – blue lupine
- Lupinus princei Harms 1901
- Lupinus somaliensis Baker f. 1895

=== Species names with uncertain taxonomic status ===
The status of the following binomials is unresolved:

- Lupinus acaulis Larrañaga
- Lupinus achilleaphilus C.P.Sm.
- Lupinus acutilobus A.Heller
- Lupinus aegr-Aovium C.P.Sm.
- Lupinus africanus Lour.
- Lupinus agninus Gand.
- Lupinus agropyrophilus C.P.Sm.
- Lupinus alaimandus C.P.Sm.
- Lupinus albicaulis Douglas ex Hook.
- Lupinus alicanescens C.P.Sm.
- Lupinus aliclementinus C.P.Sm.
- Lupinus aliumbellatus C.P.Sm.
- Lupinus altissimus Sessé & Moc.
- Lupinus alturasensis C.P.Sm.
- Lupinus alveorum C.P.Sm.
- Lupinus amabilis A.Heller
- Lupinus amniculi-cervi C.P.Sm.
- Lupinus amniculi-salicis C.P.Sm.
- Lupinus amniculi-vulpum C.P.Sm.
- Lupinus andersonianus C.P.Sm.
- Lupinus anemophilus Greene
- Lupinus angustifolius Blanco
- Lupinus aphronorus Blank.
- Lupinus apodotropis A.Heller
- Lupinus aralloius C.P.Sm.
- Lupinus arborescens Amabekova & Maisuran
- Lupinus arceuthinus Greene
- Lupinus argyraeus DC.
- Lupinus atacamicus C.P.Sm.
- Lupinus aureus J.Agardh
- Lupinus axillaris Blank.
- Lupinus barkeriae Knowles & Westc.
- Lupinus bartolomei M.E.Jones
- Lupinus bassett-maguirei C.P.Sm.
- Lupinus beaneanus C.P.Sm.
- Lupinus biddleii L.F.Hend.
- Lupinus bimaculatus Hook. ex D.Don
- Lupinus bimaculatus Desr.
- Lupinus bivonii C.Presl
- Lupinus blankinshipii A.Heller
- Lupinus blaschkeanus Fisch. & C.A.Mey.
- Lupinus brevior (Jeps.) J.A. Christian & D.B. Dunn
- Lupinus brittonii Abrams
- Lupinus caespitosus Nutt.
- Lupinus californicus K.Koch
- Lupinus campbelliae Eastw.
- Lupinus campestris Cham. & Schltdl.
- Lupinus campestris-florum C.P.Sm.
- Lupinus candicans Rydb.
- Lupinus canus Hemsl.
- Lupinus capitatus Greene
- Lupinus capitis-amniculi C.P.Sm.
- Lupinus carolus-bucarii C.P.Sm.
- Lupinus chachas Ochoa ex C. P. Smith
- Lupinus chamissonis Eschscholtz
- Lupinus chiapensis Rose
- Lupinus chihuahuensis S.Watson
- Lupinus christianus C.P.Sm.
- Lupinus chrysomelas Casar.
- Lupinus clementinus Greene
- Lupinus comatus Rydb.
- Lupinus consentinii Walp.
- Lupinus cymb-Aegressus C.P.Sm.
- Lupinus dasyphyllus Greene
- Lupinus davisianus C.P.Sm.
- Lupinus debilis Eastw.
- Lupinus decaschistus C.P.Sm.
- Lupinus diaboli-septem C.P.Sm.
- Lupinus dichrous Greene
- Lupinus dispersus A.Heller
- Lupinus dissimulans C.P.Sm.
- Lupinus durangensis C.P.Sm.
- Lupinus eatonanus C.P.Sm.
- Lupinus equi-coeli C.P.Sm.
- Lupinus equi-collis C.P.Sm.
- Lupinus erectus L.F.Hend.
- Lupinus erminens S.Watson
- Lupinus ermineus S.Watson
- Lupinus falcifer Nutt.
- Lupinus falsoerectus C.P.Sm.
- Lupinus falsoformosus C.P.Sm.
- Lupinus falsograyi C.P.Sm.
- Lupinus fieldii Rose ex J. F. Macbr.
- Lupinus filicaulis C.P.Sm.
- Lupinus finitus C.P.Sm.
- Lupinus flavescens Rydb.
- Lupinus foliosus Hook.
- Lupinus foliosus Nutt.
- Lupinus forskahlei Boiss.
- Lupinus franciscanus Greene
- Lupinus fraxinetorum Greene
- Lupinus fruticosus Steud.
- Lupinus fruticosus Dum.Cours.
- Lupinus garcianus Bennett & Dunn
- Lupinus geophilus Rose
- Lupinus geraniophilus C.P.Sm.
- Lupinus glabellus M.Martens & Galeotti
- Lupinus graciliflorus C.P.Sm.
- Lupinus gratus Greene
- Lupinus gredensis Gand.
- Lupinus guadalupensis Greene
- Lupinus guadiloupensis Steud.
- Lupinus guatimalensis auct.
- Lupinus gussoneanus J.Agardh
- Lupinus habrocomus Greene
- Lupinus haudcytisoides C.P.Sm.
- Lupinus helleri Greene
- Lupinus hexaedrus E. Fourn.
- Lupinus hintonii C.P.Sm.
- Lupinus huigrensis Rose ex C.P.Sm.
- Lupinus humicolus A.Nelson
- Lupinus humifusus Benth.
- Lupinus humilis Rose ex Pittier
- Lupinus hyacinthinus Greene
- Lupinus idoneus C.P.Sm.
- Lupinus inamoenus Greene ex C.F.Baker
- Lupinus indutus Greene ex C.F.Baker
- Lupinus insignis Glaz. ex C. P. Smith
- Lupinus integrifolius L.
- Lupinus intergrifolius Desr.
- Lupinus ione-grisetae C.P.Sm.
- Lupinus ione-walkerae C.P.Sm.
- Lupinus jamesonianus C.P.Sm.
- Lupinus javanicus Burm.f.
- Lupinus jorgensenanus C.P.Sm.
- Lupinus jucundus Greene
- Lupinus kellerrnanianus C.P.Sm.
- Lupinus kyleanus C.P.Sm.
- Lupinus labiatus Nutt.
- Lupinus lacticolor Tamayo
- Lupinus lacus-huntingtonii C.P.Sm.
- Lupinus lacuum-trinitatum C.P.Sm.
- Lupinus larsonanus C.P.Sm.
- Lupinus lassenensis Eastw.
- Lupinus latissimus Greene
- Lupinus laxifolius A.Gray
- Lupinus leptostachyus Greene
- Lupinus lesueurii Standl.
- Lupinus linearifolius Larrañaga
- Lupinus lingulae C.P.Sm.
- Lupinus longilabrum C.P.Sm.
- Lupinus lorentzianus C.P.Sm.
- Lupinus louise-bucariae C.P.Sm.
- Lupinus louise-grisetae C.P.Sm.
- Lupinus lucidus Benth. ex Loudon
- Lupinus lyman-bensonii C.P.Sm.
- Lupinus lysichitophilus C.P.Sm.
- Lupinus macrocarpus Hook. & Arn.
- Lupinus macrocarpus Torr.
- Lupinus macrophyllus Benth.
- Lupinus macrorhizos Georgi
- Lupinus magnistipulatus Planchuelo & Dunn
- Lupinus maissurianii Atabek. & Polukhina
- Lupinus marcusianus C.P.Sm.
- Lupinus mariae-josephae H.Pascual
- Lupinus markleanus C.P.Sm.
- Lupinus marschallianus Sweet
- Lupinus mearnsii C.P.Sm.
- Lupinus meli-campestris C.P.Sm.
- Lupinus meridanus Moritz ex C. P. Smith
- Lupinus mexiae C.P.Sm.
- Lupinus micensis M.E.Jones
- Lupinus micheneri Greene
- Lupinus milleri J.Agardh
- Lupinus minearanus C.P.Sm.
- Lupinus minutissimus Tamayo
- Lupinus molle A.Heller
- Lupinus mollissifolius Davidson
- Lupinus monettianus C.P.Sm.
- Lupinus muellerianus C.P.Sm.
- Lupinus multicincinnis C.P.Sm.
- Lupinus neglectus Rose
- Lupinus nemoralis Greene
- Lupinus niger Wehmer
- Lupinus noldekae Eastw.
- Lupinus nutcanus Spreng.
- Lupinus nutkatensis J.G.Cooper
- Lupinus obtunsus C.P.Sm.
- Lupinus octablomus C.P.Sm.
- Lupinus opsianthus Amabekova & Maisuran
- Lupinus pavonum C.P.Sm.
- Lupinus pendeltonii A.Heller
- Lupinus pendletonii A.Heller
- Lupinus perconfertus C.P.Sm.
- Lupinus perplexus C.P.Sm.
- Lupinus philistaeus Boiss.
- Lupinus pinus-contortae C.P.Sm.
- Lupinus piperi B.L.Rob. ex Piper
- Lupinus piperitus Davidson
- Lupinus platanophilus M.E.Jones
- Lupinus plebeius Greene ex C.F.Baker
- Lupinus prato-lacuum C.P.Sm.
- Lupinus prolifer Desr.
- Lupinus propinquus Greene
- Lupinus proteanus Eastw.
- Lupinus psoraleoides Pollard
- Lupinus pumviridis C.P.Sm.
- Lupinus puroviridis C.P.Sm.
- Lupinus purpurascens A.Heller
- Lupinus pygmaeus Tamayo
- Lupinus quercus-jugi C.P.Sm.
- Lupinus quercuum C.P.Sm.
- Lupinus rainierensis Eastw.
- Lupinus regius Rudolph ex Torr. & A.Gray
- Lupinus rhodanthus C.P.Sm.
- Lupinus rickeri C.P.Sm.
- Lupinus rivetianus C.P.Sm.
- Lupinus rydbergii Blank.
- Lupinus sabuli C.P.Sm.
- Lupinus salicisocius C.P.Sm.
- Lupinus salinensis C.P.Sm.
- Lupinus sativus Gaterau
- Lupinus scaposus Rydb.
- Lupinus scheuberae Rydb.
- Lupinus schickendantzii C.P.Sm.
- Lupinus schiedeanus Steud.
- Lupinus schumannii C.P.Sm.
- Lupinus seclusus C.P.Sm.
- Lupinus semiaequus C.P.Sm.
- Lupinus semiverticillatus Desr.
- Lupinus sergenti Tamayo ex Pittier
- Lupinus sergentii Tamayo
- Lupinus serradentum C.P.Sm.
- Lupinus shrevei C.P.Sm.
- Lupinus sierrae-zentae C.P.Sm.
- Lupinus sileri S.Watson
- Lupinus sinus-meyersii C.P. Sm.
- Lupinus sparhawkianus C.P.Sm.
- Lupinus spatulata Larrañaga
- Lupinus speciosus Voss
- Lupinus spruceanus C.P.Sm.
- Lupinus standleyensis C.P.Sm.
- Lupinus stationis C.P.Sm.
- Lupinus stiveri Kellogg
- Lupinus stoloniferus L.
- Lupinus strigulosus Gand.
- Lupinus subhirsutus Davidson
- Lupinus subvolutus C.P.Sm.
- Lupinus suksdorfii B.L. Rob. ex Piper
- Lupinus summersianus C.P.Sm.
- Lupinus sylvaticus Hemsl.
- Lupinus thermis Gasp.
- Lupinus thermus St.-Lag.
- Lupinus tilcaricus C.P.Sm.
- Lupinus timotensis Tamayo
- Lupinus tricolor Greene
- Lupinus tricolor G.Nicholson
- Lupinus trifidus Torr. ex S.Watson
- Lupinus tristis Sweet
- Lupinus trochophyllus Hoffmanns.
- Lupinus tuckeranus C.P. Sm.
- Lupinus vaginans Benth.
- Lupinus valdepallidus C.P.Sm.
- Lupinus vandykeae Eastw.
- Lupinus variegatus A.Heller
- Lupinus variegatus Poir.
- Lupinus varneranus C.P.Sm.
- Lupinus vavilovii Atabekova & Maissurjan
- Lupinus venustus Bailly
- Lupinus violaceus A.Heller
- Lupinus viridicalyx C.P.Sm.
- Lupinus volcanicus Greene
- Lupinus watsonii A.Heller
- Lupinus westiana Small
- Lupinus wolfianus C.P.Sm.
- Lupinus yanlyensis C.P.Sm.
- Lupinus yaruahensis C.P.Sm.

=== Hybrids ===
The following hybrids have been described:

- Lupinus ×alpestris (A. Nelson) D.B. Dunn & J.M. Gillett
- Lupinus ×hispanicoluteus W.Święcicki & W.K.Święcicki
- Lupinus ×hybridus Lem.
- Lupinus ×insignis Lem.
- Lupinus ×regalis (auct.) Bergmans—rainbow lupin (Lupinus arboreus × Lupinus polyphyllus)
- Lupinus ×versicolor Caball.

=== Etymology ===
While some sources believe the origin of the name to be in doubt, the Collins Dictionary definition asserts that the word is 14th century in origin, from the Latin lupīnus "wolfish" from lupus "wolf" as it was believed that the plant ravenously exhausted the soil. But a more likely explanation is that lupinus meant that the plants were as dangerous to livestock as wolves, because the alkaloid poisons of lupines can sicken or kill grazing animals, especially sheep. Farmers have known since ancient Rome that lupines improve soil by adding nitrogen and loosening compacted earth with their strong root systems, so the Collins explanation is improbable.

== Ecology ==
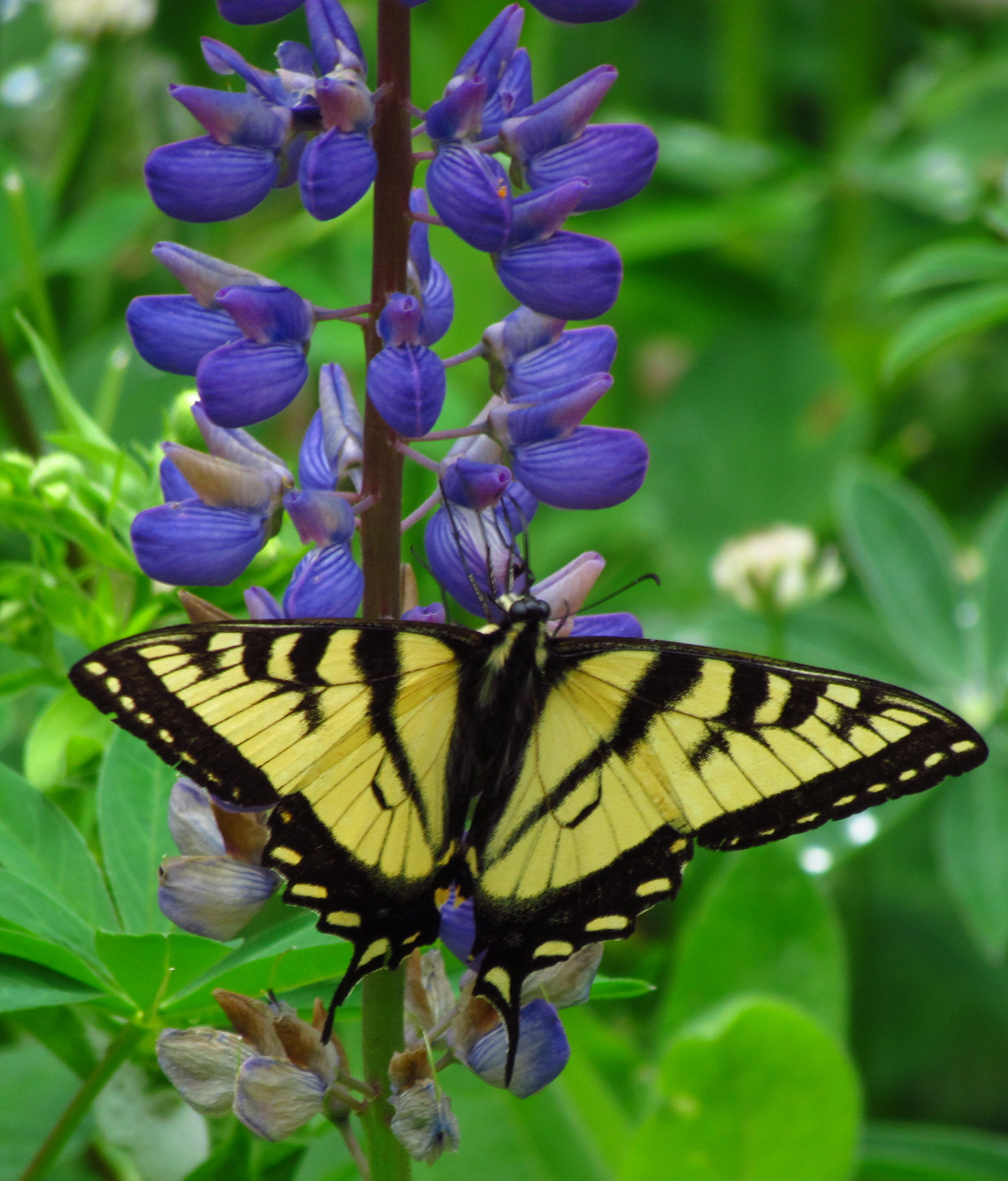
Canadian tiger swallowtail on wild perennial lupine, Gatineau, Quebec

Certain species, such as the yellow bush lupin (L. arboreus), are considered invasive weeds when they appear outside their native ranges. In New Zealand, lupines are viewed as invasive and a severe threat in some cases. L. polyphyllus has escaped into the wild and grows in large numbers along main roads and streams on the South Island. A similar spread of the species has occurred in Sweden, Finland and Norway after the non-native species was first deliberately planted in the landscaping along the main roads. Lupins have been planted in some parts of Australia with a considerably cooler climate, particularly in rural Victoria and New South Wales.

Lupins are important larval food plants for many lepidopterans (butterflies and moths). These include:

- Iraricia icarioides missionensis (Mission blue butterfly), larvae limited to Lupinus
- Callophrys irus (frosted elfin), recorded on L. perennis
- Erynnis persius (Persius duskywing)
- †Glaucopsyche xerces (Xerces blue)
- Glaucopsyche lygdamus (silvery blue)
- Plebejus melissa samuelis (Karner blue)
- Erynnis persius persius (eastern Persius duskywing)
- Schinia sueta, larvae limited to Lupinus

== Cultivation ==
Lupinus polyphyllus, the garden lupin, and Lupinus arboreus, the tree lupin, are popular ornamental plants in gardens, and are the source of numerous hybrids and cultivars in a wide range of colours, including bicolors. As legumes, lupins are good companion plants in gardens, increasing the soil nitrogen for vegetables and other plants. As well as growing in the ground, lupins can do well in pots on balconies or patios.

Russell hybrid lupin Lupinus polyphyllus, UK

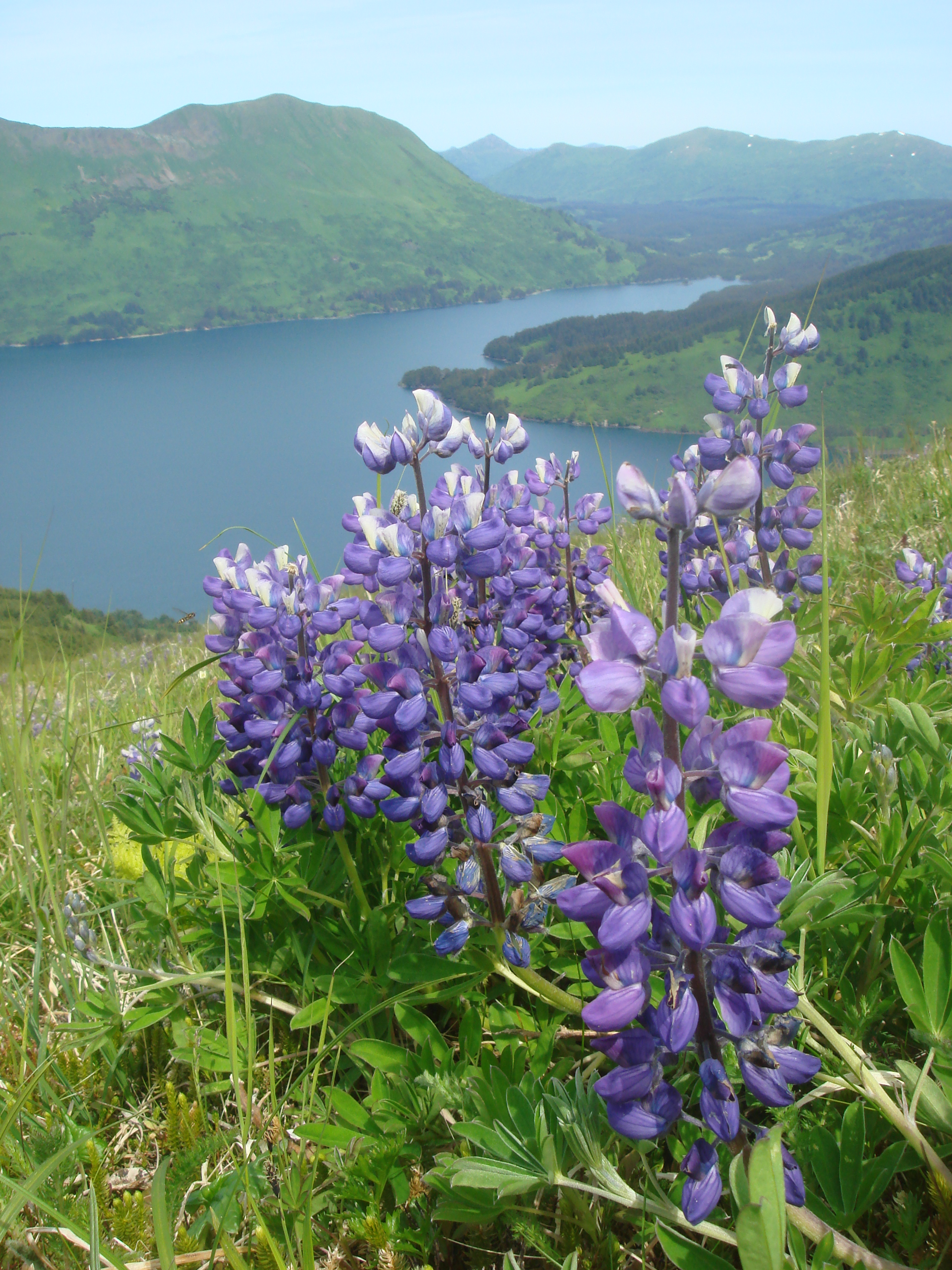
Lupinus sp., Raspberry Island, Alaska, United States

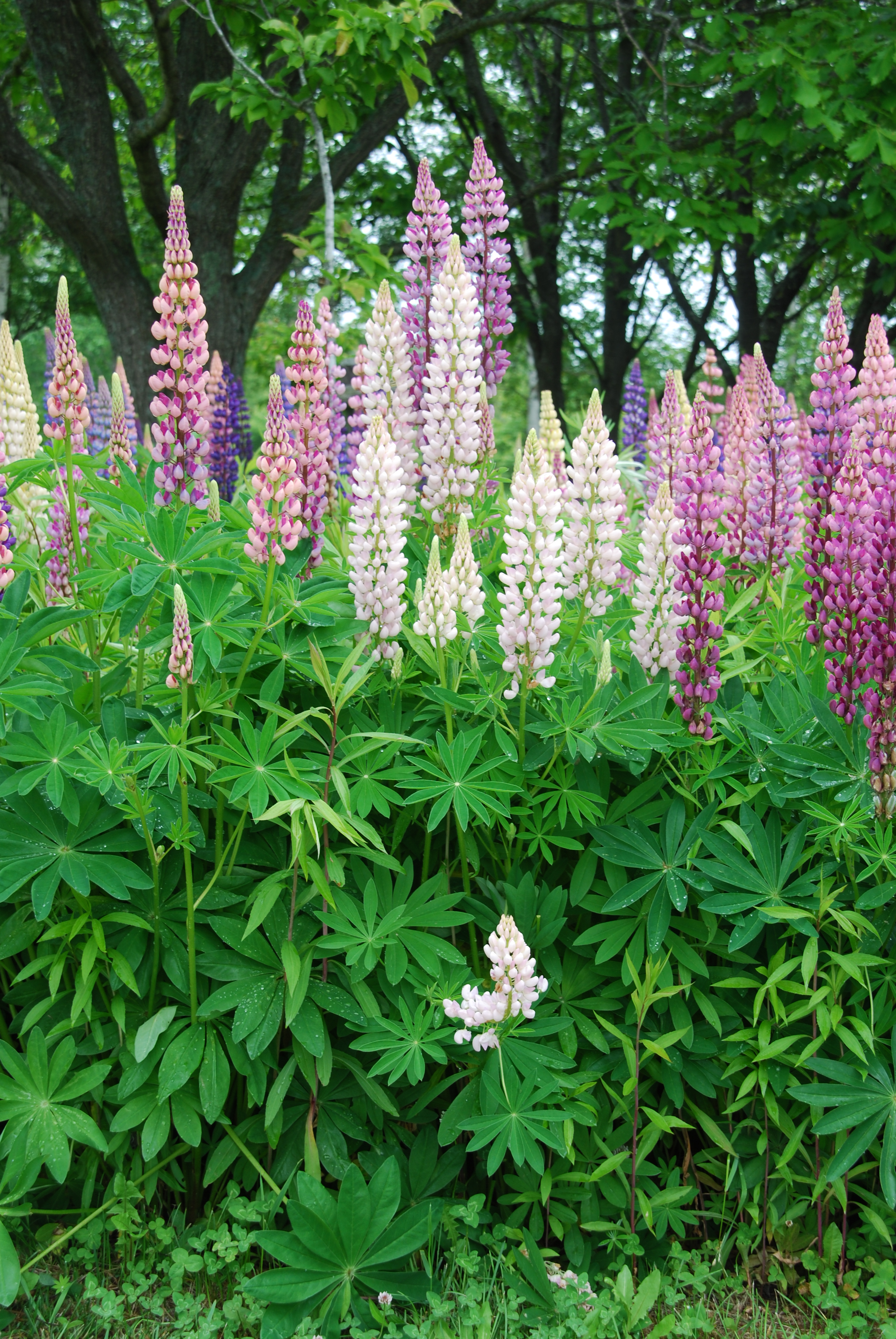
Lupins in Hokkaido, Japan

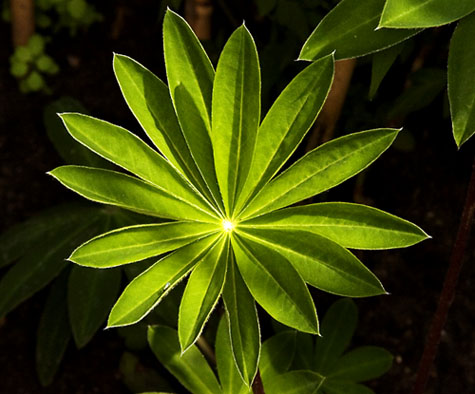
Lupin cultivar "My Castle"

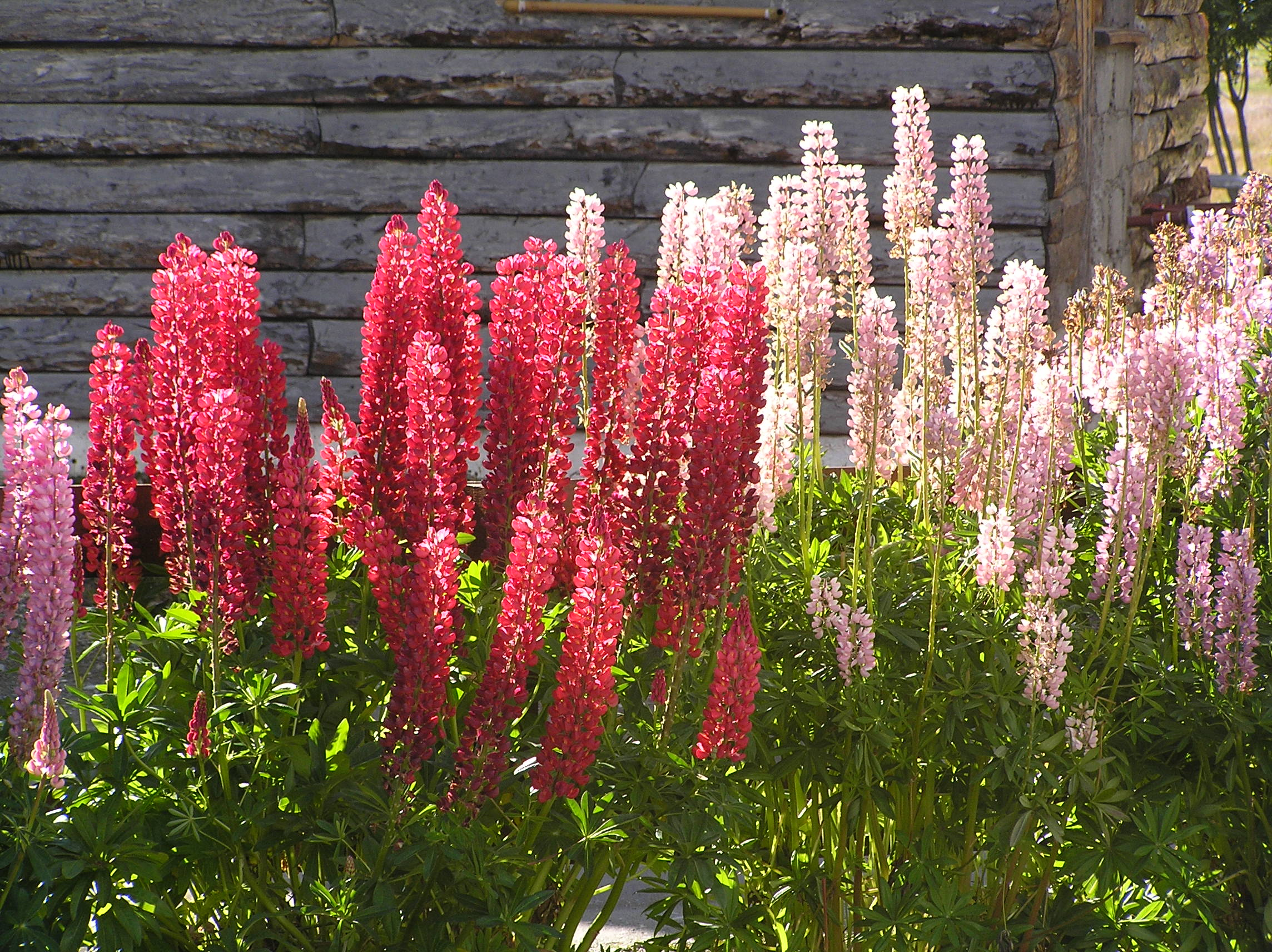
Ornamental lupins, Ushuaia, Argentina

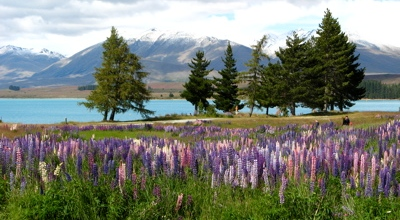
Lupins at Lake Tekapo, New Zealand

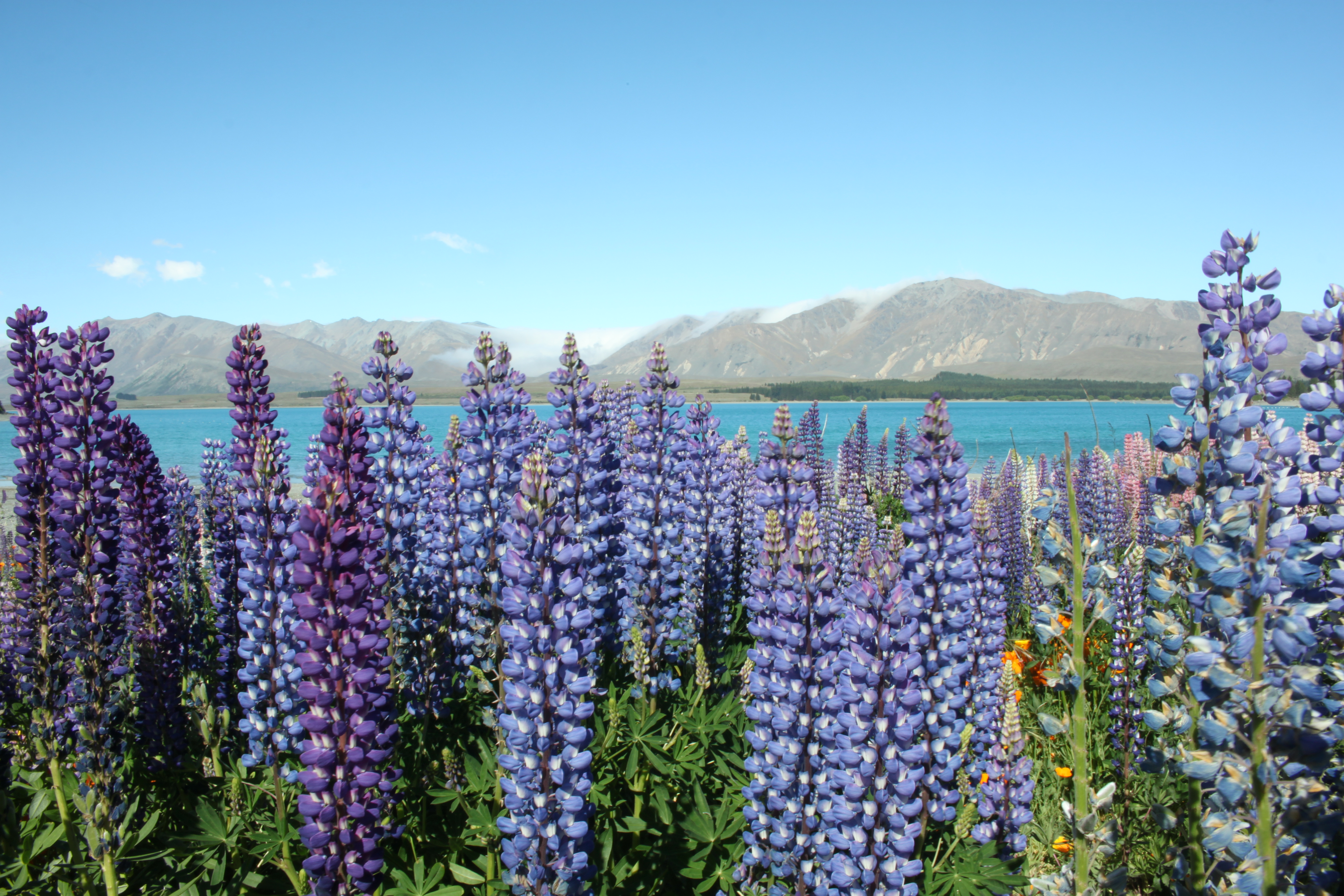
Lupins at Lake Tekapo, New Zealand

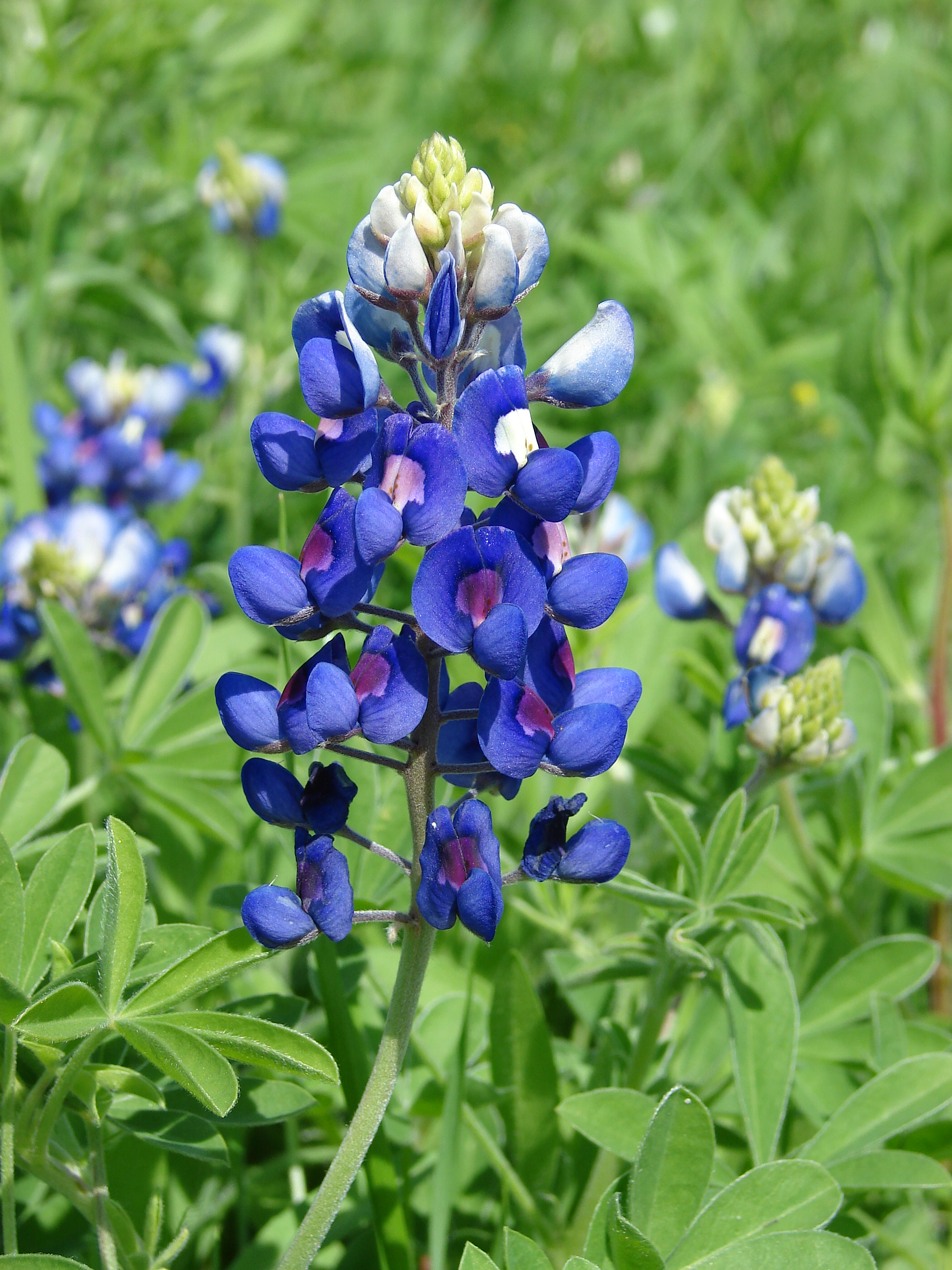
Texas Bluebonnet, Texas, United States

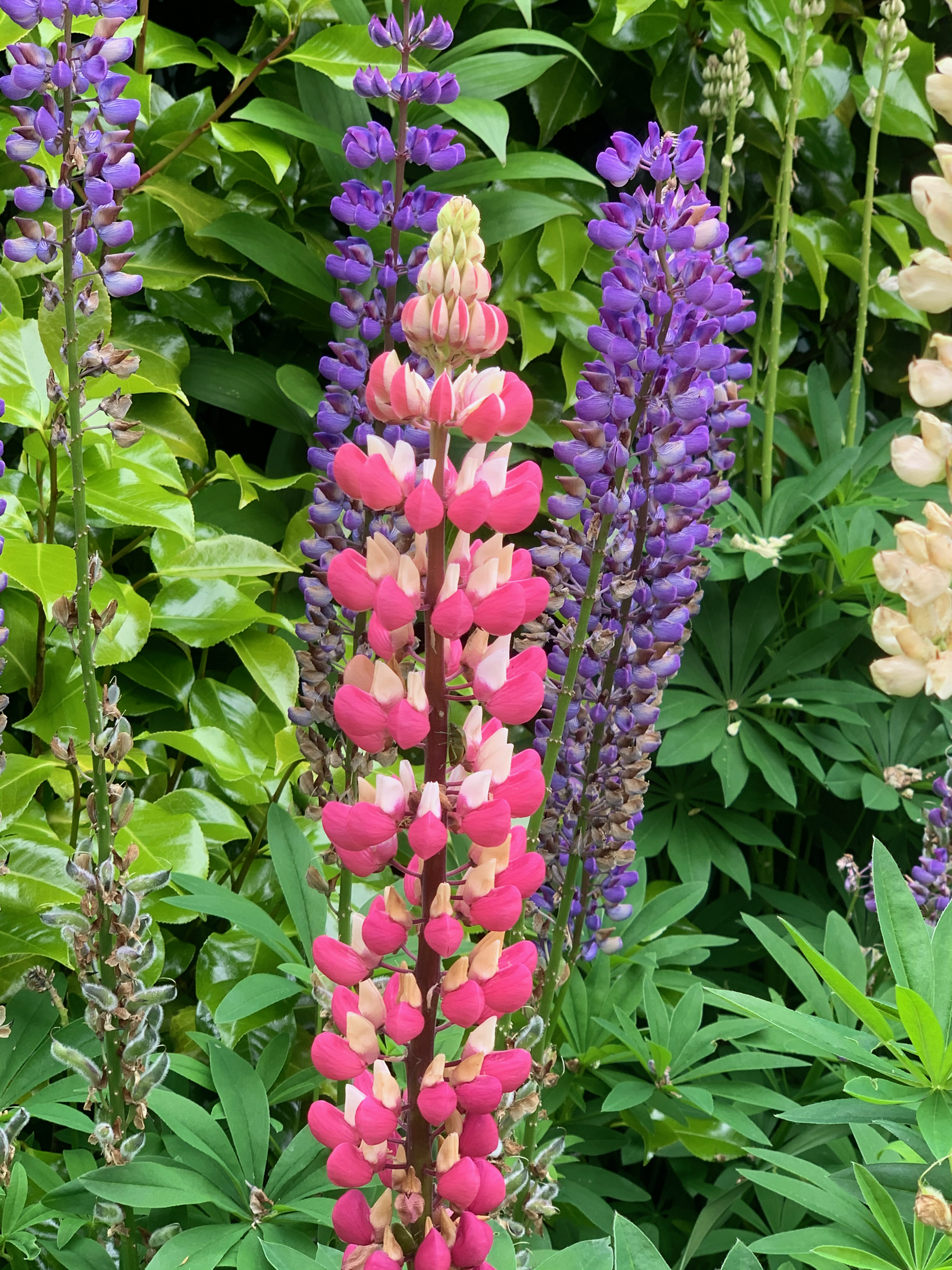
Lupins in Pacific Northwest Washington, United States

=== Agriculture ===
Like other legumes, lupines can fix nitrogen from the atmosphere into ammonia via a rhizobium–root nodule symbiosis, fertilizing the soil for other plants. This adaptation allows lupins to be tolerant of infertile soils and capable of pioneering change in barren and poor-quality soils. The genus Lupinus is nodulated by Bradyrhizobium soil bacteria.

In the early 20th century, German scientists attempted to cultivate a sweet variety of lupin lacking the bitter taste, making it more suitable for both human and animal consumption.

Many annual species of lupins are used in agriculture and most of them have Mediterranean origin. While originally cultivated as a green manure or forage, lupins are increasingly grown for their seeds, which can be used as an alternative to soybeans. Sweet (low alkaloid) lupins are highly regarded as a stock feed, particularly for ruminants, but also for pigs and poultry and more recently as an ingredient in aqua-feeds. Three Mediterranean species of lupin, blue (narrow-leafed) lupin, White Lupin, and yellow lupin, are widely cultivated for livestock and poultry feed.

The market for lupin seeds for human food is currently small, but researchers believe it has great potential. Lupin seeds are considered "superior" to soybeans in certain applications and evidence is increasing for their potential health benefits. They contain similar protein to soybean, but less fat. As a food source, they are gluten-free and high in dietary fibre, amino acids, and antioxidants, and they are considered to be prebiotic.

About 85% of the world's lupin seeds are grown in Western Australia.

== Toxicity ==
Some lupins contain certain secondary compounds, including isoflavones and toxic alkaloids, such as lupinine, anagyrine and sparteine. With early detection, these can be removed through processing, although lupins containing these elements are not usually selected for food-grade products.

A risk of lupin allergy exists in patients allergic to peanuts. Most lupin reactions reported have been in people with peanut allergy. Because of the cross-allergenicity of peanut and lupin, the European Commission, as of 2006, has required that food labels indicate the presence of "lupin and products thereof" in food.

Lupin plants can be colonized by the fungus Diaporthe toxica which can cause a mycotoxicosis known as lupinosis when ingested by grazing animals.

== Uses ==
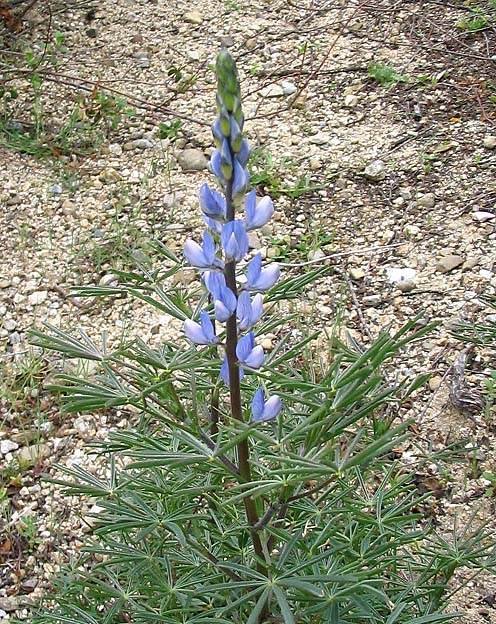
Lupinus angustifolius

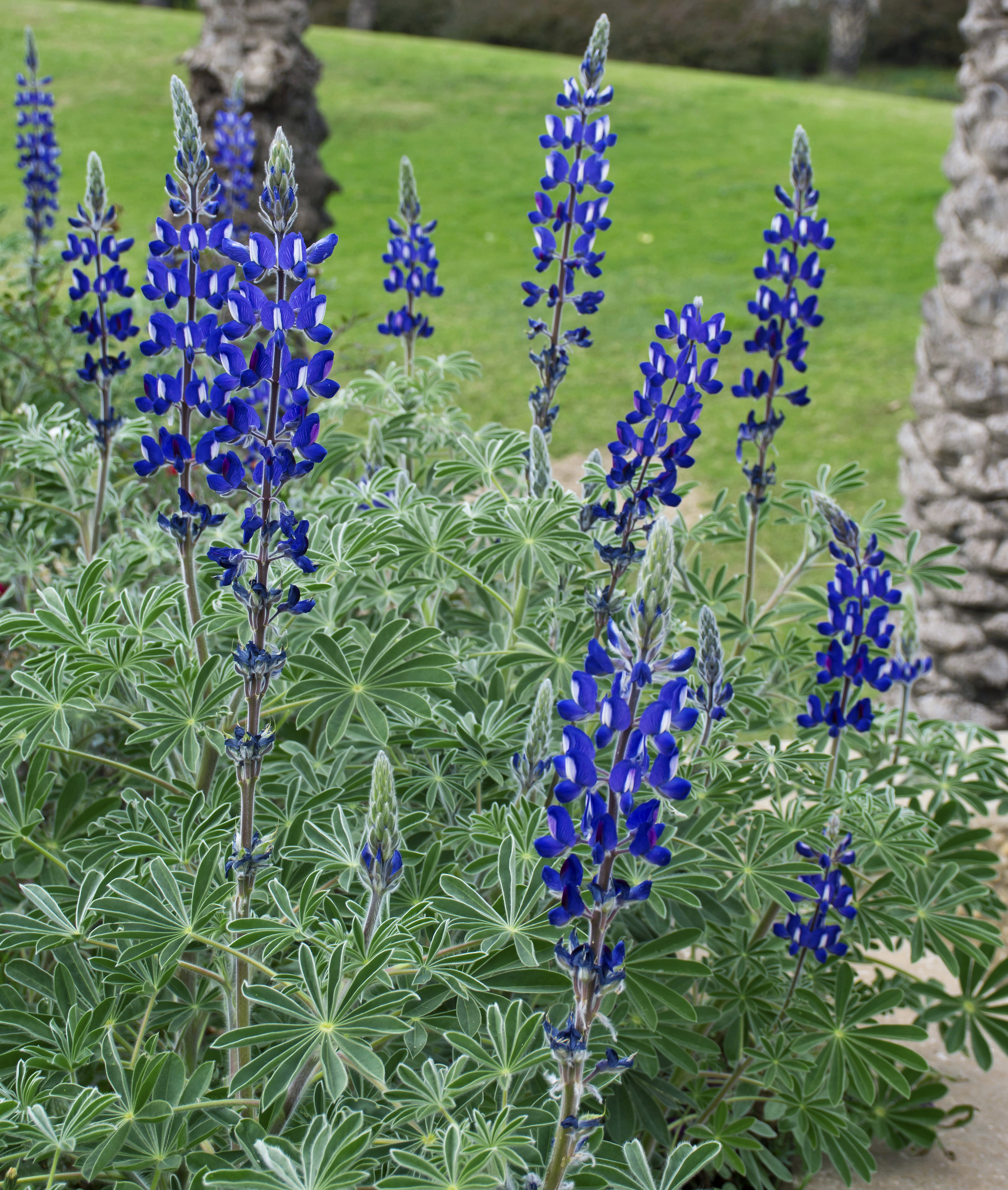
Lupinus pilosus in Tel Aviv University, Israel

The legume seeds of lupins, commonly called lupin beans, were popular with the Romans, who cultivated the plants throughout the Roman Empire where the lupin is still known in extant Romance languages by names such as lupini.

Seeds of various species of lupins have been used as a food for over 3,000 years around the Mediterranean and for as long as 6,000 years in the Andes. Lupins were also used by many Native American peoples of North America such as the Yavapai. The Andean lupin or tarwi (Lupinus mutabilis) was a widespread food in the Incan Empire; but they have never been accorded the same status as soybeans, dry peas and other pulse crops. The pearl lupin of the Andean highlands of South America, L. mutabilis, known locally as tarwi or chocho, was extensively cultivated, but no conscious genetic improvement other than to select for larger and water-permeable seeds seems to have been made. Users soaked the seed in running water to remove most of the bitter alkaloids and then cooked or toasted the seeds to make them edible, or else boiled and dried them to make kirku, reported as a pre-Columbian practice in Las Relaciones geográficas de Indias. Spanish domination led to a change in the eating habits of the indigenous peoples, and only recently (late 20th century onward) has interest in using lupins as a food been renewed.

Lupins can be used to make a variety of foods both sweet and savoury, including everyday meals, traditional fermented foods, baked foods, and sauces. The European white lupin (L. albus) beans are commonly sold in a salty solution in jars (like olives and pickles) and can be eaten with or without the skin. Lupini dishes are most commonly found in Europe, especially in Portugal, Spain, Greece, and Italy. They are also common in Brazil and Egypt. In Egypt, the lupin is known in Arabic as ترمس termes, and is a popular street snack after being treated with several soakings of water, and then brined. In Portugal, Spain, and the Spanish Harlem district of New York City, they are consumed with beer and wine. In the Levant region, the salty and chilled beans are called turmus (in Arabic: تُرمُس, Hebrew: תורמוס) and are served as part of an apéritif or a snack. Other species, such as L. albus (white lupin), L. angustifolius (narrow-leafed lupin), and L. hirsutus (blue lupin) also have edible seeds.

== Culture ==
Consumed throughout the Mediterranean region and the Andean mountains, lupins were eaten by the early Egyptian and pre-Incan people and were known to Roman agriculturalists for their ability to improve the fertility of soils.

In the late 18th century, lupins were introduced into northern Europe as a means of improving soil quality, and by the 1860s, the garden yellow lupin was seen across the sandy soils of the Baltic coastal plain.

The successful development of lupin varieties with the necessary "sweet gene" paved the way for the greater adoption of lupins across Europe and later Australia.

Further work carried out by the Western Australian Department of Agriculture and Food during the 1950s and '60s has led to more sweet lupin crops being produced in Western Australia now than anywhere else in the world.

Bluebonnets, including the Texas bluebonnet (L. texensis), are the state flowers of Texas.

== See also ==
- Alice Eastwood
- Lupinus mutabilis, an edible species of Lupinus
