= Charles Piper Smith =

American botanist (1877–1955)

- Born: 1877
- Died: 1955 (aged 77–78)
- Occupation: Botanist
- Notable work: Studies in the Genus Lupinus, Plurality of Seeds in Acorns of Quercus Prinus

Charles Piper Smith (1877 – 1955) was an American botanist. Smith's work primarily involved the genus Lupinus, specifically the subgenus Platycarpos. His extensive field research was centralized to the western coast of the United States, with a large majority of his observations taking place in California and Oregon. Throughout his career, he published at least 150 botanical classifications consisting of both new species and new variants of already established species.

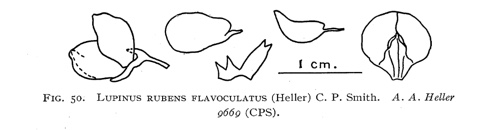
Lupinus rubens flavoculatus as originally illustrated by Amos Arthur Heller and later identified and published by Charles Piper Smith in his journals.

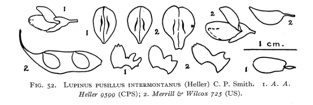
Lupinus pusillus intermontanus as illustrated by Amos Arthur Heller and classified/republished by Charles Piper Smith in his journals.

== Works ==
The most notable of his published works is his series of journals known as Studies in the Genus Lupinus posted in the Bulletin of the Torrey Botanical Club, which was once an academic journal publication for what is now known as the Torrey Botanical Society. 11 volumes of Studies in the Genus Lupinus were published by Smith over the span of 7 years (1917-1924). Though his work specialized primarily on Lupinus, he also published observations on the Quercus (oak) genus, highlighting seed number in acorns from various species present in Stoughton, Massachusetts in his journal Plurality of Seeds in Acorns of Quercus Prinus.
