= List of Lupinus species =

The following species in the flowering plant genus Lupinus, the lupins or lupines, are accepted by Plants of the World Online. Although the genus originated in the Old World, about 500 of these species are native to the New World, probably due to multiple adaptive radiation events.

- Lupinus aberrans C.P.Sm.
- Lupinus acopalcus C.P.Sm.
- Lupinus adinoanthus C.P.Sm.
- Lupinus adsurgens Drew
- Lupinus affinis J.Agardh
- Lupinus agardhianus A.Heller
- Lupinus alaimandus C.P.Sm.
- Lupinus alaristatus C.P.Sm.
- Lupinus albert-smithianus C.P.Sm.
- Lupinus albescens Hook. & Arn.
- Lupinus albicaulis Douglas
- Lupinus albifrons Benth.
- Lupinus albosericeus C.P.Sm.
- Lupinus albus L.
- Lupinus alcis-montis C.P.Sm.
- Lupinus aliamandus C.P.Sm.
- Lupinus aliattenuatus C.P.Sm.
- Lupinus alibicolor C.P.Sm.
- Lupinus alimanens C.P.Sm.
- Lupinus alinanus C.P.Sm.
- Lupinus alipatulus C.P.Sm.
- Lupinus alirevolutus C.P.Sm.
- Lupinus alivillosus C.P.Sm.
- Lupinus allargyreius C.P.Sm.
- Lupinus alopecuroides Desr.
- Lupinus altimontanus C.P.Sm.
- Lupinus altiplani C.P.Sm.
- Lupinus alveorum C.P.Sm.
- Lupinus amabayensis C.P.Sm.
- Lupinus amandus C.P.Sm.
- Lupinus amboensis C.P.Sm.
- Lupinus ammophilus Greene
- Lupinus amnis-otuni C.P.Sm.
- Lupinus ampaiensis C.P.Sm.
- Lupinus amphibius Suksd.
- Lupinus ananeanus Ulbr.
- Lupinus anatolicus W.Święcicki & W.K.Święcicki
- Lupinus andersonii S.Watson
- Lupinus andicola Gillies ex Hook. & Arn.
- Lupinus andinus Rose ex J.F.Macbr.
- Lupinus angustiflorus Eastw.
- Lupinus angustifolius L.
- Lupinus antensis C.P.Sm.
- Lupinus antoninus Eastw.
- Lupinus apertus A.Heller
- Lupinus appositus C.P.Sm.
- Lupinus aralloius C.P.Sm.
- Lupinus arboreus Sims
- Lupinus arbustus Douglas
- Lupinus arbutosocius C.P.Sm.
- Lupinus archeranus C.P.Sm.
- Lupinus arcticus S.Watson
- Lupinus arenarius Gardner
- Lupinus arequipensis C.P.Sm.
- Lupinus argenteus Pursh
- Lupinus argurocalyx C.P.Sm.
- Lupinus aridulus C.P.Sm.
- Lupinus aridus Douglas
- Lupinus ariste-josephi C.P.Sm.
- Lupinus arizelus C.P.Sm.
- Lupinus arizonicus (S.Watson) S.Watson
- Lupinus arvensi-plasketti C.P.Sm.
- Lupinus arvensis Benth.
- Lupinus asa-grayanus C.P.Sm.
- Lupinus aschenbornii S.Schauer
- Lupinus asplundianus C.P.Sm.
- Lupinus asymbepus C.P.Sm.
- Lupinus atacamicus C.P.Sm.
- Lupinus atlanticus Gladst.
- Lupinus atropurpureus C.P.Sm.
- Lupinus aureonitens Gillies ex Hook. & Arn.
- Lupinus aureus J.Agardh
- Lupinus austrobicolor C.P.Sm.
- Lupinus austrohumifusus C.P.Sm.
- Lupinus austrorientalis C.P.Sm.
- Lupinus austrosericeus C.P.Sm.
- Lupinus ballianus C.P.Sm.
- Lupinus bandelierae C.P.Sm.
- Lupinus bangii Rusby
- Lupinus barbatilabius C.P.Sm.
- Lupinus barbiger S.Watson
- Lupinus barkeri Lindl.
- Lupinus bartlettianus C.P.Sm.
- Lupinus bartolomei M.E.Jones
- Lupinus benthamii A.Heller
- Lupinus bicolor Lindl.
- Lupinus bi-inclinatus C.P.Sm.
- Lupinus bingenensis Suksd.
- Lupinus blaisdellii Eastw.
- Lupinus bogotensis Benth.
- Lupinus bolivianus Rusby ex C.P.Sm.
- Lupinus bombycinocarpus C.P.Sm.
- Lupinus boyacensis C.P.Sm.
- Lupinus brachypremnon C.P.Sm.
- Lupinus bracteolaris Desr.
- Lupinus brevecuneus C.P.Sm.
- Lupinus brevicaulis S.Watson
- Lupinus brevior (Jeps.) J.A.Christian & D.B.Dunn
- Lupinus breviscapus Ulbr.
- Lupinus breweri A.Gray
- Lupinus bryoides C.P.Sm.
- Lupinus buchtienii Rusby
- Lupinus burkartianus C.P.Sm.
- Lupinus burkei S.Watson
- Lupinus caballoanus B.L.Turner
- Lupinus cachupatensis C.P.Sm.
- Lupinus cacuminis Standl.
- Lupinus caespitosus Nutt.
- Lupinus calcensis C.P.Sm.
- Lupinus caldasensis C.P.Sm.
- Lupinus camiloanus C.P.Sm.
- Lupinus canus Hemsl.
- Lupinus carazensis Ulbr.
- Lupinus carchiensis C.P.Sm.
- Lupinus cardenasianus C.P.Sm.
- Lupinus carhuamayus C.P.Sm.
- Lupinus carlos-ochoae C.P.Sm.
- Lupinus carpapaticus C.P.Sm.
- Lupinus carrikeri C.P.Sm.
- Lupinus caucensis C.P.Sm.
- Lupinus caudatus Kellogg
- Lupinus cavicaulis C.P.Sm.
- Lupinus ccorilazensis Vargas ex C.P.Sm.
- Lupinus celsimontanus C.P.Sm.
- Lupinus cervinus Kellogg
- Lupinus cesaranus C.P.Sm.
- Lupinus cesar-vargasii C.P.Sm.
- Lupinus chachas Ochoa ex C.P.Sm.
- Lupinus chamissonis Eschsch.
- Lupinus chavanillensis (J.F.Macbr.) C.P.Sm.
- Lupinus chiapensis Rose
- Lupinus chihuahuensis S.Watson
- Lupinus chipaquensis C.P.Sm.
- Lupinus chlorolepis C.P.Sm.
- Lupinus chocontensis C.P.Sm.
- Lupinus chongos-bajous C.P.Sm.
- Lupinus christinae A.Heller
- Lupinus chrysanthus Ulbr.
- Lupinus chrysocalyx C.P.Sm.
- Lupinus chumbivilcensis C.P.Sm.
- Lupinus citrinus Kellogg
- Lupinus clarkei Oerst.
- Lupinus cochapatensis C.P.Sm.
- Lupinus colcabambensis C.P.Sm.
- Lupinus colombiensis C.P.Sm.
- Lupinus compactiflorus Rose
- Lupinus comptus Mart. ex Benth.
- Lupinus concinnus J.Agardh
- Lupinus condensiflorus C.P.Sm.
- Lupinus confertus Kellogg
- Lupinus congdonii (C.P.Sm.) D.B.Dunn
- Lupinus conicus C.P.Sm.
- Lupinus constancei T.W.Nelson & J.P.Nelson
- Lupinus convencionensis C.P.Sm.
- Lupinus cookianus C.P.Sm.
- Lupinus coriaceus Benth.
- Lupinus cosentinii Guss.
- Lupinus costaricensis D.B.Dunn
- Lupinus cotopaxiensis C.P.Sm.
- Lupinus couthouyanus C.P.Sm.
- Lupinus covillei Greene
- Lupinus croceus Eastw.
- Lupinus crotalarioides Mart. ex Benth.
- Lupinus crucis-viridis C.P.Sm.
- Lupinus cuatrecasasii C.P.Sm.
- Lupinus culbertsonii Greene
- Lupinus cumulicola Small
- Lupinus cusickii S.Watson
- Lupinus cuspidatus Rusby
- Lupinus cuzcensis C.P.Sm.
- Lupinus × cymba-egressus C.P.Sm.
- Lupinus cymboides C.P.Sm.
- Lupinus dalesiae Eastw.
- Lupinus decaschistus C.P.Sm.
- Lupinus decemplex C.P.Sm.
- Lupinus decurrens Gardner
- Lupinus deflexus Congdon
- Lupinus delicatulus Sprague & L.Riley
- Lupinus densiflorus Benth.
- Lupinus depressus Rydb.
- Lupinus diasemus C.P.Sm.
- Lupinus diehlii M.E.Jones
- Lupinus diffusus Nutt.
- Lupinus digitatus Forssk.
- Lupinus disjunctus C.P.Sm.
- Lupinus dissimulans C.P.Sm.
- Lupinus dorae C.P.Sm.
- Lupinus dotatus C.P.Sm.
- Lupinus durangensis C.P.Sm.
- Lupinus duranii Eastw.
- Lupinus dusenianus C.P.Sm.
- Lupinus eanophyllus C.P.Sm.
- Lupinus edysomatus C.P.Sm.
- Lupinus egens C.P.Sm.
- Lupinus ehrenbergii Schltdl.
- Lupinus elaphoglossum Barneby
- Lupinus elatus I.M.Johnst.
- Lupinus elegans Kunth
- Lupinus elegantulus Eastw.
- Lupinus ellsworthianus C.P.Sm.
- Lupinus elmeri Greene
- Lupinus eramosus C.P.Sm.
- Lupinus erectifolius C.P.Sm.
- Lupinus eremonomus C.P.Sm.
- Lupinus eriocalyx (C.P.Sm.) C.P.Sm.
- Lupinus eriocladus Ulbr.
- Lupinus ermineus S.Watson
- Lupinus espinarensis C.P.Sm.
- Lupinus evermannii Rydb.
- Lupinus exaltatus Zucc.
- Lupinus excubitus M.E.Jones
- Lupinus exochus C.P.Sm.
- Lupinus expetendus C.P.Sm.
- Lupinus extrarius C.P.Sm.
- Lupinus falsomutabilis C.P.Sm.
- Lupinus falsoprostratus C.P.Sm.
- Lupinus falsorevolutus C.P.Sm.
- Lupinus famelicus C.P.Sm.
- Lupinus fiebrigianus Ulbr.
- Lupinus fieldii Rose ex J.F.Macbr.
- Lupinus filicaulis C.P.Sm.
- Lupinus fissicalyx A.Heller
- Lupinus flavoculatus A.Heller
- Lupinus foliolosus Benth.
- Lupinus formosus Greene
- Lupinus fragrans A.Heller
- Lupinus francis-whittieri C.P.Sm.
- Lupinus fratrum C.P.Sm.
- Lupinus fulcratus Greene
- Lupinus gachetensis C.P.Sm.
- Lupinus garfieldensis C.P.Sm.
- Lupinus gaudichaudianus C.P.Sm.
- Lupinus gayanus C.P.Sm.
- Lupinus gentryanus C.P.Sm.
- Lupinus gibertianus C.P.Sm.
- Lupinus giganteus Rose
- Lupinus glabratus J.Agardh
- Lupinus goodspeedii J.F.Macbr.
- Lupinus gormanii Piper
- Lupinus gracilentus Greene
- Lupinus grauensis C.P.Sm.
- Lupinus grayi S.Watson
- Lupinus gredensis Gand.
- Lupinus grisebachianus C.P.Sm.
- Lupinus guadalupensis Greene
- Lupinus guaraniticus (Hassl.) C.P.Sm.
- Lupinus guascensis C.P.Sm.
- Lupinus guggenheimianus Rusby
- Lupinus gussoneanus J.Agardh
- Lupinus hamaticalyx C.P.Sm.
- Lupinus hartmannii C.P.Sm.
- Lupinus haughtianus C.P.Sm.
- Lupinus hautcarazensis C.P.Sm.
- Lupinus havardii S.Watson
- Lupinus hazenanus C.P.Sm.
- Lupinus heptaphyllus (Vell.) Hassl.
- Lupinus herreranus C.P.Sm.
- Lupinus herzogii Ulbr.
- Lupinus hieronymi C.P.Sm.
- Lupinus hillii Greene
- Lupinus hinkleyorum C.P.Sm.
- Lupinus hintonii C.P.Sm.
- Lupinus hintoniorum B.L.Turner
- Lupinus hirsutissimus Benth.
- Lupinus hispanicus Boiss. & Reut.
- Lupinus holosericeus Nutt.
- Lupinus holwayorum C.P.Sm.
- Lupinus honoratus C.P.Sm.
- Lupinus horizontalis A.Heller
- Lupinus hornemannii J.Agardh
- Lupinus hortonianus C.P.Sm.
- Lupinus hortorum C.P.Sm.
- Lupinus howardii M.E.Jones
- Lupinus howard-scottii C.P.Sm.
- Lupinus huachucanus M.E.Jones
- Lupinus huancayoensis C.P.Sm.
- Lupinus huariacus C.P.Sm.
- Lupinus huaronensis J.F.Macbr.
- Lupinus huigrensis Rose ex C.P.Sm.
- Lupinus humifusus Sessé & Moc. ex G.Don
- Lupinus hyacinthinus Greene
- Lupinus idoneus C.P.Sm.
- Lupinus ignobilis C.P.Sm.
- Lupinus imminutus C.P.Sm.
- Lupinus insulae C.P.Sm.
- Lupinus interruptus Benth.
- Lupinus intortus C.P.Sm.
- Lupinus inusitatus C.P.Sm.
- Lupinus involutus C.P.Sm.
- Lupinus × inyoensis A.Heller
- Lupinus jahnii Rose ex Pittier & C.P.Sm.
- Lupinus jaimehintonianus B.L.Turner
- Lupinus jamesonianus C.P.Sm.
- Lupinus james-westii C.P.Sm.
- Lupinus jean-julesii C.P.Sm.
- Lupinus jelskianus C.P.Sm.
- Lupinus johannis-howellii C.P.Sm.
- Lupinus jonesii Rydb.
- Lupinus jujuyensis C.P.Sm.
- Lupinus juninensis C.P.Sm.
- Lupinus kalenbornorum C.P.Sm.
- Lupinus kellermanianus C.P.Sm.
- Lupinus killipianus C.P.Sm.
- Lupinus kingii S.Watson
- Lupinus klamathensis Eastw.
- Lupinus kunthii J.Agardh
- Lupinus kuschei Eastw.
- Lupinus lacus C.P.Sm.
- Lupinus laevigatus Benth.
- Lupinus lagunae-negrae C.P.Sm.
- Lupinus lanatocarpus C.P.Sm.
- Lupinus lanatus Benth.
- Lupinus lapidicola A.Heller
- Lupinus latifolius Lindl. ex J.Agardh
- Lupinus laudandrus C.P.Sm.
- Lupinus lechlerianus C.P.Sm.
- Lupinus ledigianus C.P.Sm.
- Lupinus lemmonii C.P.Sm.
- Lupinus lepidus Douglas ex Lindl.
- Lupinus leptocarpus Benth.
- Lupinus leptophyllus Schltdl. & Cham.
- Lupinus lespedezoides C.P.Sm.
- Lupinus lesueurii Standl.
- Lupinus leucophyllus Douglas ex Lindl.
- Lupinus lindleyanus J.Agardh
- Lupinus linearis Desr.
- Lupinus littoralis Douglas ex Lindl.
- Lupinus lobbianus C.P.Sm.
- Lupinus longifolius (S.Watson) Abrams
- Lupinus longilabrum C.P.Sm.
- Lupinus lorenzensis C.P.Sm.
- Lupinus ludovicianus Greene
- Lupinus luisanae N.Contr.-Ortiz & Jara
- Lupinus luteolus Kellogg
- Lupinus lutescens C.P.Sm.
- Lupinus luteus L.
- Lupinus lyallii A.Gray
- Lupinus macbrideianus C.P.Sm.
- Lupinus × macounii Rydb.
- Lupinus macranthus Rose
- Lupinus maculatus Rydb.
- Lupinus maderensis Seem.
- Lupinus magdalenensis C.P.Sm.
- Lupinus magnificus M.E.Jones
- Lupinus magniflorus C.P.Sm.
- Lupinus magnistipulatus Planchuelo & D.B.Dunn
- Lupinus malacophyllus Greene
- Lupinus malacotrichus C.P.Sm.
- Lupinus maleopinatus C.P.Sm.
- Lupinus mandonianus C.P.Sm.
- Lupinus mantaroensis C.P.Sm.
- Lupinus mariae-josephae H.Pascual
- Lupinus marschallianus Sweet
- Lupinus martensis C.P.Sm.
- Lupinus martinetianus (C.P.Sm.) C.P.Sm.
- Lupinus mathewsianus C.P.Sm.
- Lupinus matucanicus Ulbr.
- Lupinus mearnsii C.P.Sm.
- Lupinus meionanthus A.Gray
- Lupinus melaphyllus C.P.Sm.
- Lupinus meridanus O.Moritz
- Lupinus metensis C.P.Sm.
- Lupinus mexiae C.P.Sm.
- Lupinus mexicanus Cerv. ex Lag.
- Lupinus michelianus C.P.Sm.
- Lupinus microcarpus Sims
- Lupinus microphyllus Desr.
- Lupinus minimus Douglas
- Lupinus mirabilis C.P.Sm.
- Lupinus misticola Ulbr.
- Lupinus mollendoensis Ulbr.
- Lupinus mollis A.Heller
- Lupinus monserratensis C.P.Sm.
- Lupinus montanus Kunth
- Lupinus monticola Rydb.
- Lupinus moritzianus Kunth
- Lupinus mucronulatus Howell
- Lupinus muelleri Standl.
- Lupinus multiflorus Desr.
- Lupinus munzianus C.P.Sm.
- Lupinus mutabilis Sweet
- Lupinus nanus Douglas ex Benth.
- Lupinus neglectus Rose
- Lupinus nehmadiae C.P.Sm.
- Lupinus neocotus C.P.Sm.
- Lupinus neomexicanus Greene
- Lupinus nepubescens C.P.Sm.
- Lupinus nevadensis A.Heller
- Lupinus nipomensis Eastw.
- Lupinus niveus S.Watson
- Lupinus nonoensis C.P.Sm.
- Lupinus nootkatensis Donn ex Sims
- Lupinus notabilis C.P.Sm.
- Lupinus nubigenus Kunth
- Lupinus nubilorum C.P.Sm.
- Lupinus obscurus C.P.Sm.
- Lupinus obtunsus C.P.Sm.
- Lupinus obtusilobus A.Heller
- Lupinus ochoanus C.P.Sm.
- Lupinus octablomus C.P.Sm.
- Lupinus onustus S.Watson
- Lupinus opertospicus C.P.Sm.
- Lupinus oquendoanus C.P.Sm.
- Lupinus oreganus A.Heller
- Lupinus oreophilus Phil.
- Lupinus ornatus Douglas ex Lindl.
- Lupinus oscar-haughtii C.P.Sm.
- Lupinus oscarii R.Bernal
- Lupinus otto-buchtienii C.P.Sm.
- Lupinus otto-kuntzeanus C.P.Sm.
- Lupinus otuzcoensis C.P.Sm.
- Lupinus ovalifolius Benth.
- Lupinus pachanoanus C.P.Sm.
- Lupinus pachitensis C.P.Sm.
- Lupinus pachylobus Greene
- Lupinus padre-crowleyi C.P.Sm.
- Lupinus palaestinus Boiss.
- Lupinus pallidus Brandegee
- Lupinus paniculatus Desr.
- Lupinus paraguariensis Chodat & Hassl.
- Lupinus paranensis C.P.Sm.
- Lupinus paruroensis C.P.Sm.
- Lupinus parvifolius Gardner
- Lupinus pasachoensis C.P.Sm.
- Lupinus patulus C.P.Sm.
- Lupinus paucartambensis C.P.Sm.
- Lupinus paucovillosus C.P.Sm.
- Lupinus pearceanus C.P.Sm.
- Lupinus peirsonii H.Mason
- Lupinus pendentiflorus C.P.Sm.
- Lupinus penlandianus C.P.Sm.
- Lupinus perblandus C.P.Sm.
- Lupinus perbonus C.P.Sm.
- Lupinus perennis L.
- Lupinus perissophytus C.P.Sm.
- Lupinus persistens Rose
- Lupinus peruvianus Ulbr.
- Lupinus philippianus C.P.Sm.
- Lupinus pickeringii A.Gray
- Lupinus pilosissimus M.Martens & Galeotti
- Lupinus pilosus L.
- Lupinus pinguis Ulbr.
- Lupinus pipersmithianus J.F.Macbr.
- Lupinus pisacensis C.P.Sm.
- Lupinus piurensis C.P.Sm.
- Lupinus platamodes C.P.Sm.
- Lupinus plattensis S.Watson
- Lupinus platyptenus C.P.Sm.
- Lupinus polycarpus Greene
- Lupinus polyphyllus Lindl.
- Lupinus poopoensis C.P.Sm.
- Lupinus popayanensis C.P.Sm.
- Lupinus potosinus Rose
- Lupinus praealtus C.P.Sm.
- Lupinus praestabilis C.P.Sm.
- Lupinus praetermissus C.P.Sm.
- Lupinus pratensis A.Heller
- Lupinus princei Harms
- Lupinus pringlei Rose
- Lupinus proculaustrinus C.P.Sm.
- Lupinus prostratus J.Agardh
- Lupinus protrusus C.P.Sm.
- Lupinus prouvensalanus C.P.Sm.
- Lupinus prunophilus M.E.Jones
- Lupinus × pseudopolyphyllus C.P.Sm.
- Lupinus pseudotsugoides C.P.Sm.
- Lupinus pubescens Benth.
- Lupinus pucapucensis C.P.Sm.
- Lupinus pulloviridus C.P.Sm.
- Lupinus pulvinaris Ulbr.
- Lupinus punto-reyesensis C.P.Sm.
- Lupinus puracensis C.P.Sm.
- Lupinus purdieanus C.P.Sm.
- Lupinus × pureriae C.P.Sm.
- Lupinus purosericeus C.P.Sm.
- Lupinus purpurascens A.Heller
- Lupinus pusillus Pursh
- Lupinus puyupatensis C.P.Sm.
- Lupinus pycnostachys C.P.Sm.
- Lupinus quellomayus C.P.Sm.
- Lupinus quercuum C.P.Sm.
- Lupinus quitensis C.P.Sm.
- Lupinus radiatus C.P.Sm.
- Lupinus ramosissimus Benth.
- Lupinus reflexus Rose
- Lupinus regnellianus C.P.Sm.
- Lupinus reitzii Burkart ex M.Pinheiro & Miotto
- Lupinus revolutus C.P.Sm.
- Lupinus rhodanthus C.P.Sm.
- Lupinus richardianus C.P.Sm.
- Lupinus rivetianus C.P.Sm.
- Lupinus rivularis Douglas ex Lindl.
- Lupinus romasanus Ulbr.
- Lupinus roseolus Rydb.
- Lupinus roseorum C.P.Sm.
- Lupinus rotundiflorus M.E.Jones
- Lupinus rowleeanus C.P.Sm.
- Lupinus ruber A.Heller
- Lupinus rubriflorus Planchuelo
- Lupinus ruizensis C.P.Sm.
- Lupinus rupestris Kunth
- Lupinus rusbyanus C.P.Sm.
- Lupinus russellianus C.P.Sm.
- Lupinus sabinianus Douglas ex Lindl.
- Lupinus sandiensis C.P.Sm.
- Lupinus santanderensis C.P.Sm.
- Lupinus sarmentosus Desr.
- Lupinus saxatilis Ulbr.
- Lupinus saxosus Howell
- Lupinus schickendantzii C.P.Sm.
- Lupinus schumannii C.P.Sm.
- Lupinus seifrizianus C.P.Sm.
- Lupinus sellowianus Harms
- Lupinus sellulus Kellogg
- Lupinus semiaequus C.P.Sm.
- Lupinus semiprostratus C.P.Sm.
- Lupinus semperflorens Hartw. ex Benth.
- Lupinus sericatus Kellogg
- Lupinus sericeolodix C.P.Sm.
- Lupinus sericeus Pursh
- Lupinus shockleyi S.Watson
- Lupinus shrevei C.P.Sm.
- Lupinus sierrae-blancae Wooton & Standl.
- Lupinus simonsianus C.P.Sm.
- Lupinus simulans Rose
- Lupinus sinaloensis C.P.Sm.
- Lupinus smithianus Kunth
- Lupinus solanagrorum C.P.Sm.
- Lupinus somaliensis Baker
- Lupinus soratensis Rusby
- Lupinus soukupianus C.P.Sm. ex J.F.Macbr.
- Lupinus sparsiflorus Benth.
- Lupinus spectabilis Hoover
- Lupinus splendens Rose
- Lupinus spruceanus C.P.Sm.
- Lupinus staffordiae C.P.Sm.
- Lupinus stipulatus J.Agardh
- Lupinus stiversii Kellogg
- Lupinus storkianus C.P.Sm.
- Lupinus subacaulis Griseb.
- Lupinus subcarnosus Hook.
- Lupinus subcuneatus C.P.Sm.
- Lupinus subhamatus C.P.Sm.
- Lupinus subinflatus C.P.Sm.
- Lupinus subsessilis Benth.
- Lupinus subtomentosus C.P.Sm.
- Lupinus subvexus C.P.Sm.
- Lupinus succulentus Douglas ex K.Koch
- Lupinus sufferrugineus Rusby
- Lupinus suksdorfii B.L.Rob.
- Lupinus sulphureus Douglas
- Lupinus summersianus C.P.Sm.
- Lupinus surcoensis C.P.Sm.
- Lupinus syriggedes C.P.Sm.
- Lupinus tacitus C.P.Sm.
- Lupinus tafiensis C.P.Sm.
- Lupinus talahuensis C.P.Sm.
- Lupinus tarapacensis C.P.Sm.
- Lupinus tarijensis Ulbr.
- Lupinus tarmaensis C.P.Sm.
- Lupinus tassilicus Maire
- Lupinus tatei Rusby
- Lupinus taurimortuus C.P.Sm.
- Lupinus tauris Benth.
- Lupinus tayacajensis C.P.Sm.
- Lupinus tetracercophorus C.P.Sm.
- Lupinus texensis Hook.
- Lupinus tidestromii Greene
- Lupinus tolimensis C.P.Sm.
- Lupinus tomentosus DC.
- Lupinus tominensis Wedd.
- Lupinus toratensis C.P.Sm.
- Lupinus tracyi Eastw.
- Lupinus triananus C.P.Sm.
- Lupinus truncatus Nutt. ex Hook. & Arn.
- Lupinus tucumanensis C.P.Sm.
- Lupinus ulbrichianus C.P.Sm.
- Lupinus uleanus C.P.Sm.
- Lupinus ultramontanus C.P.Sm.
- Lupinus umidicola C.P.Sm.
- Lupinus uncialis S.Watson
- Lupinus uncinatus Schltdl.
- Lupinus urcoensis C.P.Sm.
- Lupinus urubambensis C.P.Sm.
- Lupinus valerioi Standl.
- Lupinus vallicola A.Heller
- Lupinus vargasianus C.P.Sm.
- Lupinus varicaulis C.P.Sm.
- Lupinus variicolor Steud.
- Lupinus varnerianus C.P.Sm.
- Lupinus velillensis C.P.Sm.
- Lupinus velutinus Benth.
- Lupinus venezuelensis C.P.Sm.
- Lupinus ventosus C.P.Sm.
- Lupinus verbasciformis Sandwith
- Lupinus verjonensis C.P.Sm.
- Lupinus vernicius Rose
- Lupinus versicolor Sweet
- Lupinus viduus C.P.Sm.
- Lupinus vilcabambensis C.P.Sm.
- Lupinus villosus Willd.
- Lupinus visoensis J.F.Macbr.
- Lupinus volubilis C.P.Sm.
- Lupinus volutans Greene
- Lupinus weberbaueri Ulbr.
- Lupinus werdermannianus C.P.Sm.
- Lupinus westianus Small
- Lupinus wilkesianus C.P.Sm.
- Lupinus william-lobbii C.P.Sm.
- Lupinus williamsianus C.P.Sm.
- Lupinus wyethii S.Watson
- Lupinus xanthophyllus C.P.Sm.
- Lupinus xenophytus C.P.Sm.
- Lupinus yanahuancensis C.P.Sm.
- Lupinus yarushensis C.P.Sm.
- Lupinus yaulyensis C.P.Sm.
- Lupinus ynesiae C.P.Sm.
