= Lupinus conicus =

Conservation status
- Data Deficient (IUCN 3.1)

Scientific classification
- Kingdom: Plantae
- Clade: Tracheophytes
- Clade: Angiosperms
- Clade: Eudicots
- Clade: Rosids
- Order: Fabales
- Family: Fabaceae
- Subfamily: Faboideae
- Genus: Lupinus
- Species: L. conicus

Binomial name
- Lupinus conicus C.P.Sm, 1941

Species of plant

Lupinus conicus is a species of annual plant in the genus Lupinus. Additionally, it is a toxic plant and should not be consumed in any way.

== Habitat ==
Lupinus conicus is native to both Peru and Bolivia. Like most Lupinus species (or plants in general), it must be planted in clay, sand or loam for it to grow properly.
