= Lupinus smithianus =

Conservation status
- Data Deficient (IUCN 3.1)

Scientific classification
- Kingdom: Plantae
- Clade: Tracheophytes
- Clade: Angiosperms
- Clade: Eudicots
- Clade: Rosids
- Order: Fabales
- Family: Fabaceae
- Subfamily: Faboideae
- Genus: Lupinus
- Species: L. smithianus

Binomial name
- Lupinus smithianus Kunth

Species of legume

Lupinus smithianus is a species of legume in the family Fabaceae. It is found in Ecuador and Colombia. Its natural habitat is subtropical or tropical high-altitude grassland. It is most commonly found in the months of August, April, and July.
