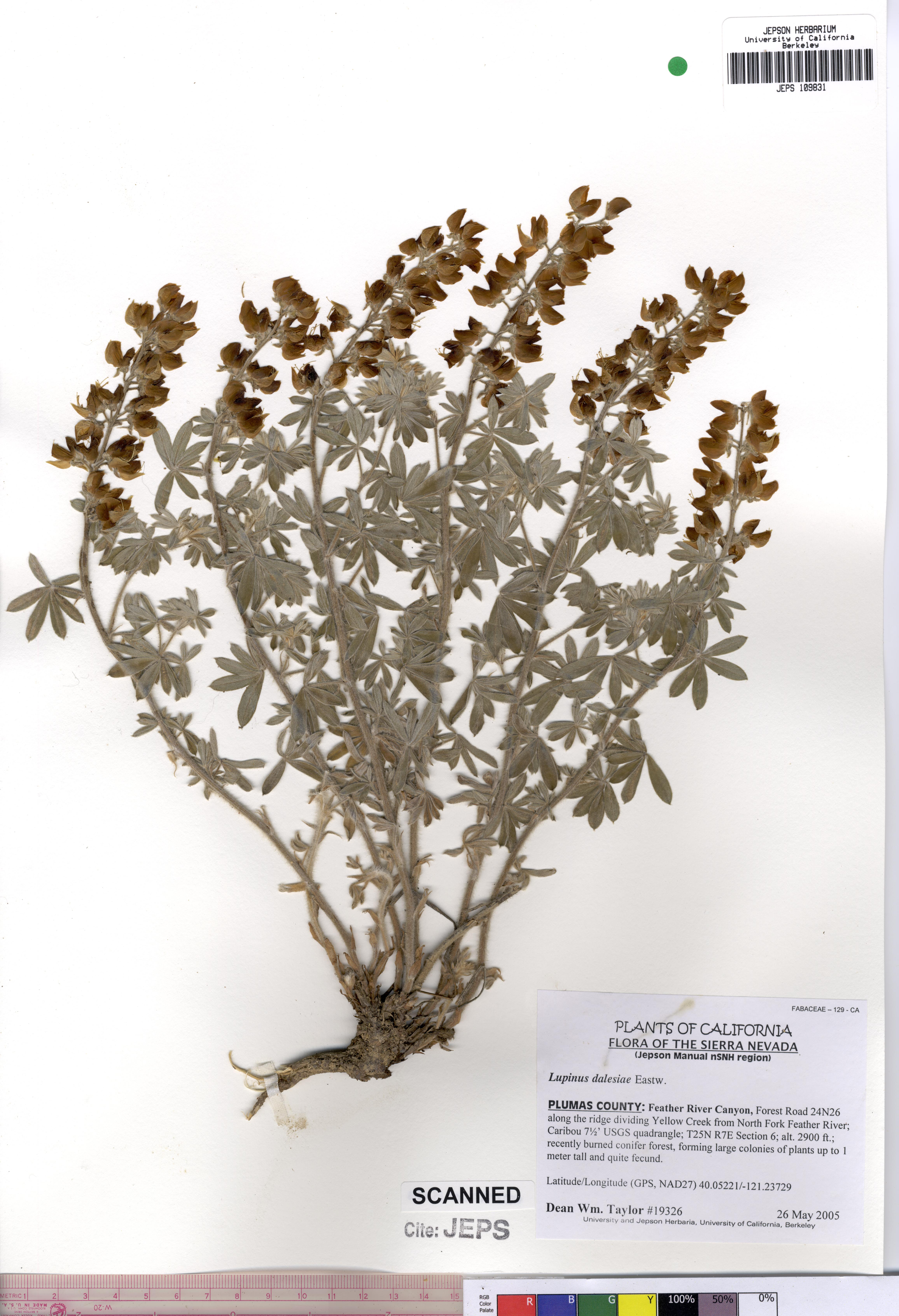

Scientific classification
- Kingdom: Plantae
- Clade: Tracheophytes
- Clade: Angiosperms
- Clade: Eudicots
- Clade: Rosids
- Order: Fabales
- Family: Fabaceae
- Subfamily: Faboideae
- Genus: Lupinus
- Species: L. dalesiae

Binomial name
- Lupinus dalesiae Eastw.

= Lupinus dalesiae =

Species of legume

Lupinus dalesiae is a species of lupine known by the common name Quincy lupine. It is endemic to California, where it is known from the northernmost slopes of the Sierra Nevada. This is an erect perennial herb up to half a meter tall. Each palmate leaf is made up of 6 to 9 leaflets each up to 4.5 centimetres (1.8 in) long. The herbage is coated in white hairs. The inflorescence bears whorls of yellow flowers roughly a centimeter long which yield rough-haired legume pods 2 or 3 centimeters in length.
