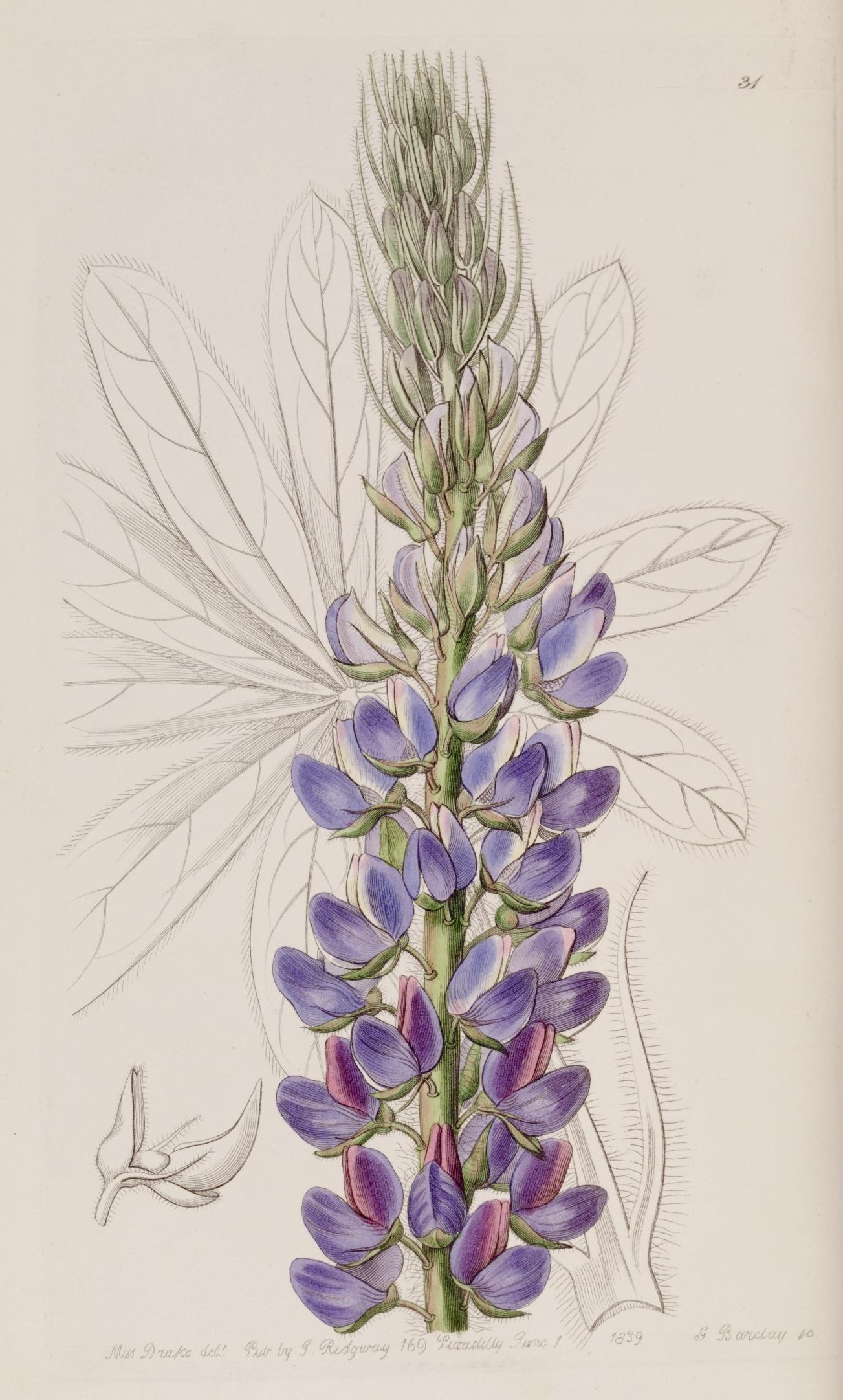

Scientific classification
- Kingdom: Plantae
- Clade: Tracheophytes
- Clade: Angiosperms
- Clade: Eudicots
- Clade: Rosids
- Order: Fabales
- Family: Fabaceae
- Subfamily: Faboideae
- Genus: Lupinus
- Species: L. ehrenbergii

Binomial name
- Lupinus ehrenbergii Schltdl. (1838)

= Lupinus ehrenbergii =

Species of legume

Lupinus ehrenbergii is a species of lupine native to Mexico, Honduras, and Guatemala. It has been introduced to Malawi, Poland, Tanzania, and New Guinea.
