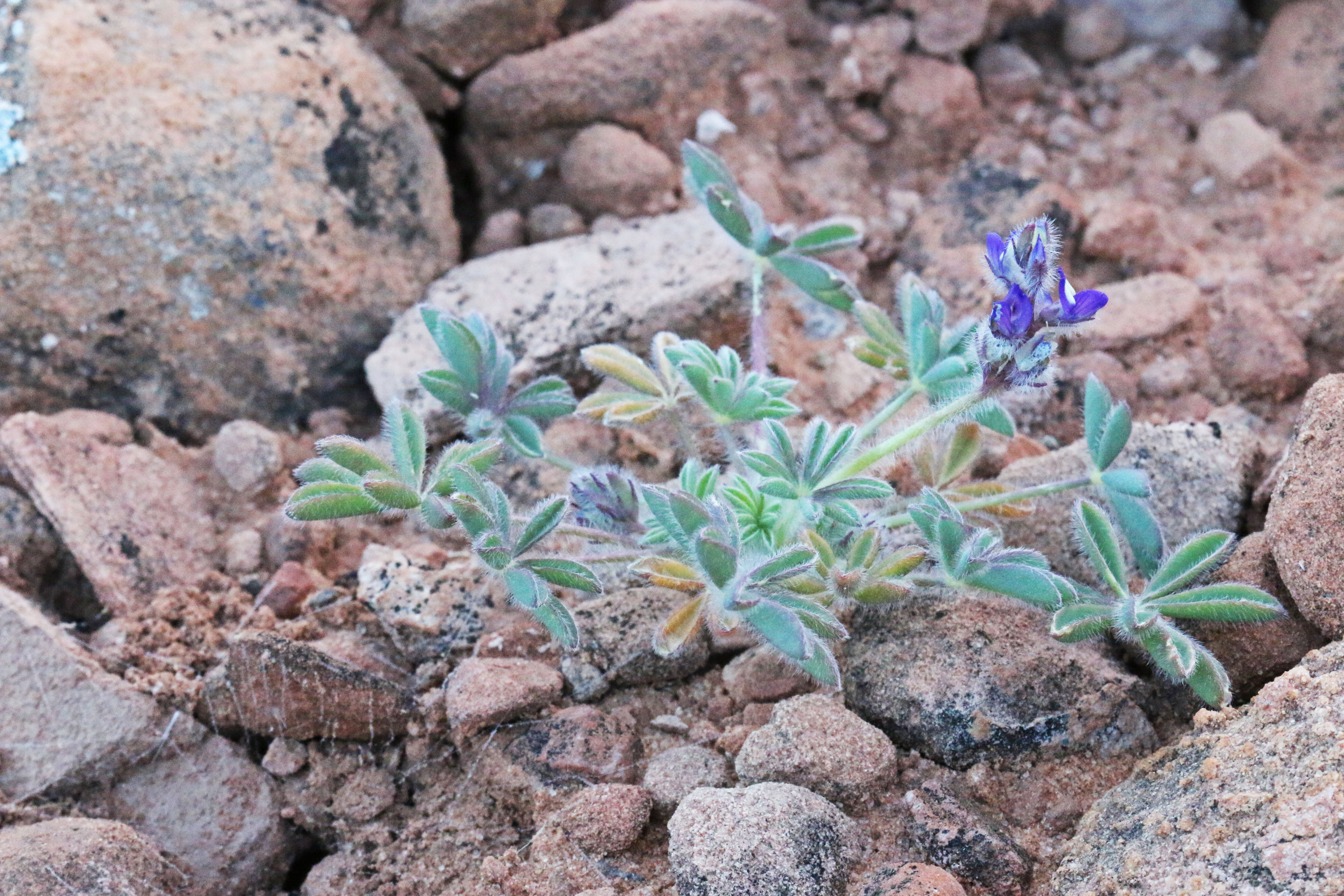

Conservation status
- Secure (NatureServe)

Scientific classification
- Kingdom: Plantae
- Clade: Tracheophytes
- Clade: Angiosperms
- Clade: Eudicots
- Clade: Rosids
- Order: Fabales
- Family: Fabaceae
- Subfamily: Faboideae
- Genus: Lupinus
- Species: L. brevicaulis

Binomial name
- Lupinus brevicaulis S.Watson

= Lupinus brevicaulis =

Species of legume

Lupinus brevicaulis is a species of lupine known by the common names shortstem lupine and sand lupine. It is native to the southwestern United States, including Oregon, California, Nevada, Utah, Colorado, Arizona, and New Mexico, where it grows in many types of sandy habitat.

== Description ==
This is a hairy annual herb growing nearly flat in a spread on the ground with a stem just a few centimeters long. An array of leaves encircles the base. Each palmate leaf is made up of 6 to 8 leaflets about a centimeter long and a few millimeters in width. The inflorescence is a petite spiral of flowers a few centimeters long just arising past the basal disc of leaves. Each flower is 6 to 8 millimeters long and bright blue in color, generally with a white or yellowish spot on its banner. It ranges from 5 to 10 centimeters in height. It grows from a taproot. The stems are absent. The leaves are in a basal tuft, and on petioles 1 to 7 centimeters long. There are 5 to 8 leaflets per leaf. The flowers are either purple-blue or white in color. They are in dense, nearly spherical clusters about 2 centimeters long. The clusters are held up on peduncles up to 6 centimeters long. The fruit is a hairy legume pod about a centimeter long containing 1 or 2 beanlike seeds. It usually blooms in May and June.

in their youth, it is almost impossible to tell apart this species from L. kingii, but as they mature, L. kingii is a lot bigger in every aspect than L. brevicaulis. You can also tell them apart by L. brevicaulis's lack of stem. Another way to tell them apart is the length of the calyx lips. Flowering begins when the peduncle is very short. The cotyledons are light green, round, and persistent.

== Uses ==
The crushed leaves are used as a liniment on boils. It is also used in the treatment of sterility.
