= Lupinus albert-smithianus =

Scientific classification
- Kingdom: Plantae
- Clade: Tracheophytes
- Clade: Angiosperms
- Clade: Eudicots
- Clade: Rosids
- Order: Fabales
- Family: Fabaceae
- Subfamily: Faboideae
- Genus: Lupinus
- Species: L. albert-smithianus

Binomial name
- Lupinus albert-smithianus Charles Piper Smith

Species of legume

Lupinus albert-smithianus is a species of lupine that is native to Peru. It is a non-climbing shrub that grows in the montane biome. It was first published in Spec. Lupinorum: 279 (1941) by Charles Piper Smith.

It most commonly is found in June, with all six GBIF observations being in June. It was found five times in 1929 and once in 1966.
