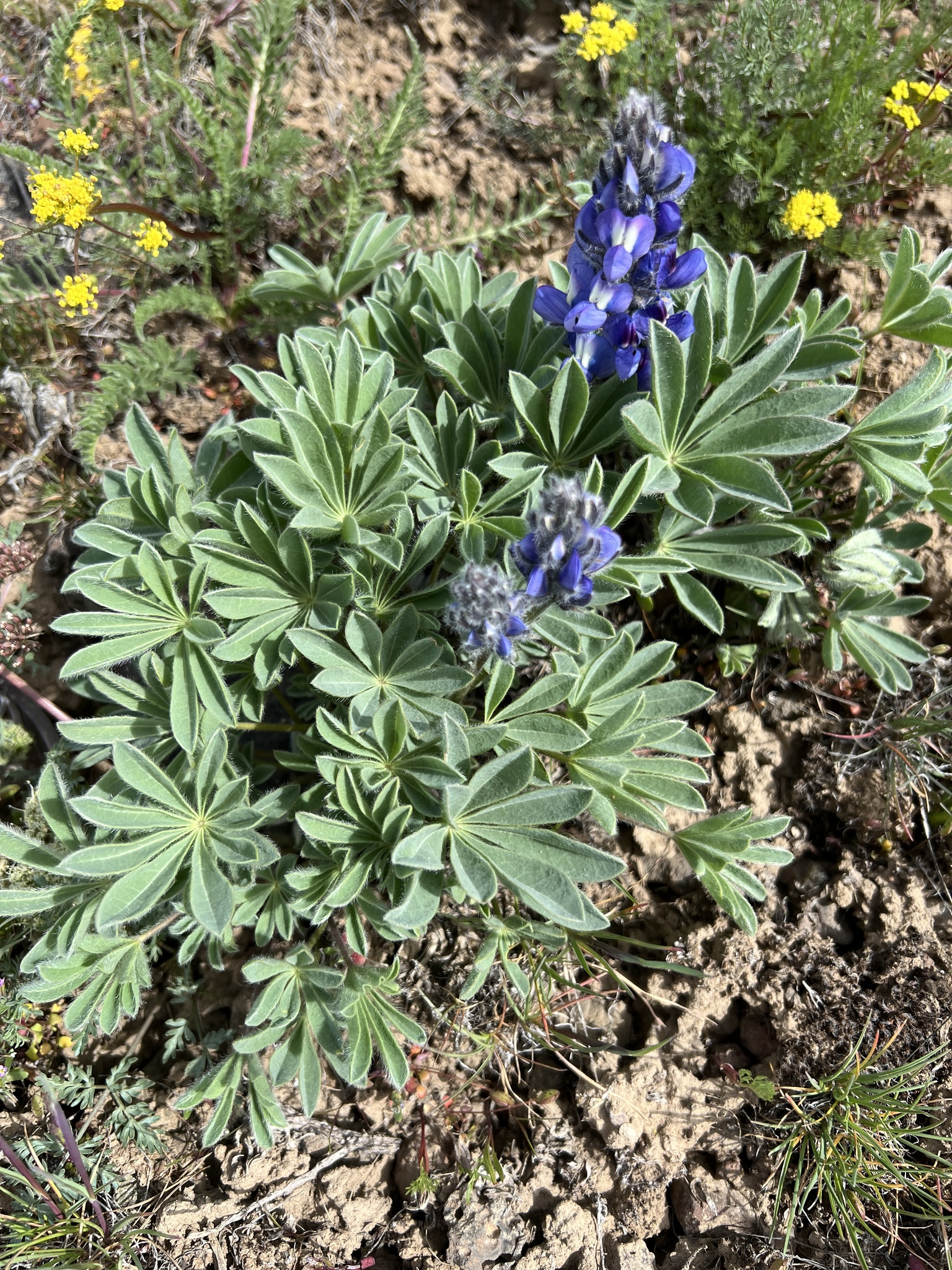

Conservation status
- Secure (NatureServe)

Scientific classification
- Kingdom: Plantae
- Clade: Tracheophytes
- Clade: Angiosperms
- Clade: Eudicots
- Clade: Rosids
- Order: Fabales
- Family: Fabaceae
- Subfamily: Faboideae
- Genus: Lupinus
- Species: L. saxosus

Binomial name
- Lupinus saxosus Howell

Synonyms
- Lupinus polyphyllus var. saxosus (Howell)

= Lupinus saxosus =

Species of legume

Lupinus saxosus is a species of lupine known by the common name rock lupine. It is native to eastern Washington, eastern Oregon, and the northeast corner of California,where it grows in sagebrush and other habitat. It may also be native to Idaho and Nevada.

== Description ==
This is a perennial herb growing erect 20 to 30 centimeters (7.9 to 11.8 in) tall. Each palmate leaf is made up of 7 to 13 hairy leaflets 1 to 4 centimeters (0.39 to 1.57 in) long. Stiff long hairs are found on the undersides and edges of the leaves, with no hair on top. The inflorescence is a dense raceme of many flowers sometimes arranged in whorls. The flower is between 1 and 2 centimeters (0.39 and 0.79 in) long and blue in color with a yellowish or violet patch on its banner. The fruit is a shaggy-haired legume pod up to 4 centimeters (1.6 in) in length. The flowering time is early spring. The 8 to 12 leaflets have acute or rounded tips. It is shorter than most lupine species. The bloom period is between the months of May and June. You shouldn’t eat any part of the lupine. It is most commonly found between the elevations of 4,000 to 6,000 feet (1,200 to 1,800 m). 52.3% of the time it was found, it was found in May, and 19.8% of the time, it was found in June.

== Habitat ==
This lupine grows in poor rocky soils and is often found in shallow soils that are dry to basalt bedrock by midsummer.
