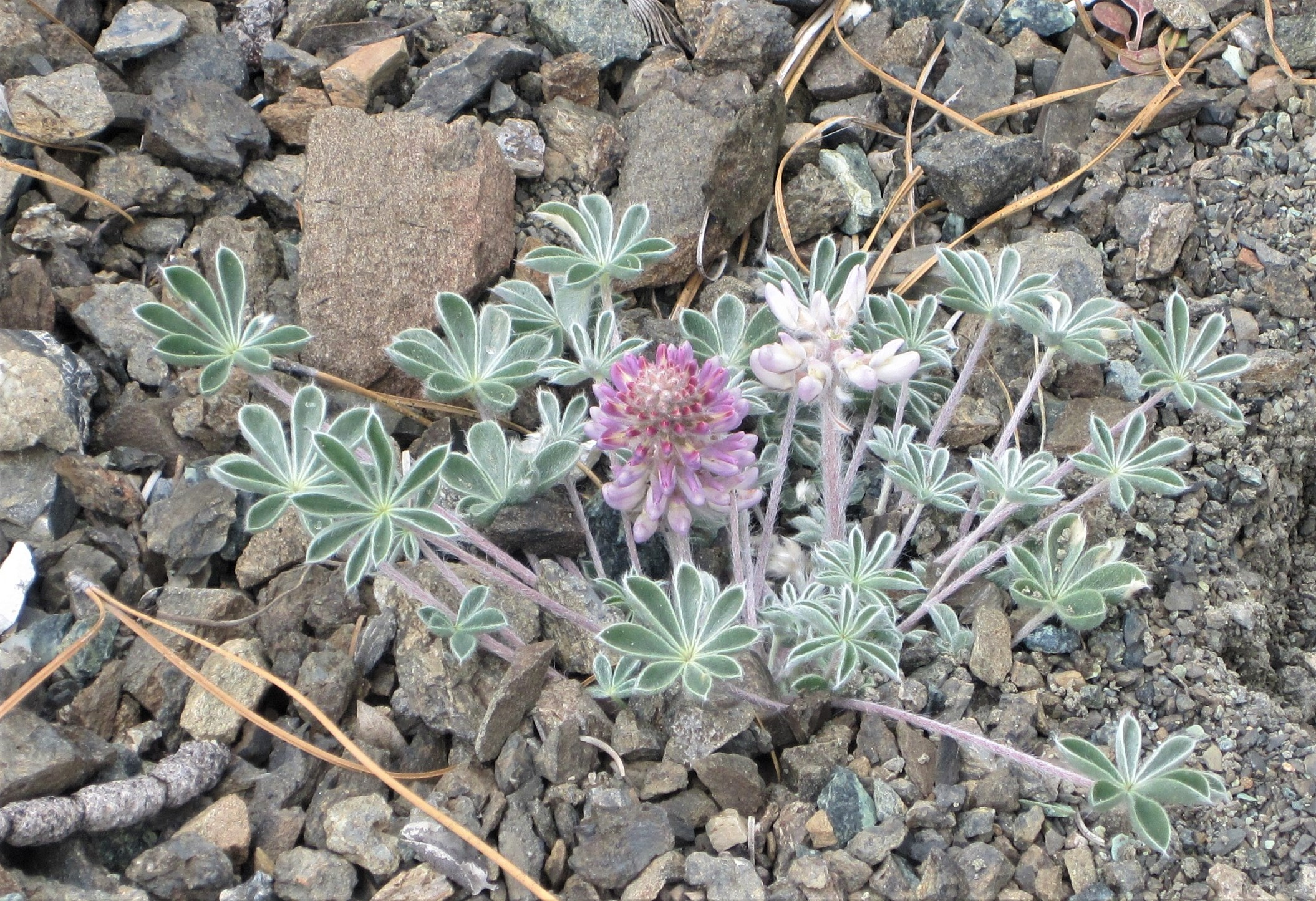

Conservation status
- Critically Imperiled (NatureServe)

Scientific classification
- Kingdom: Plantae
- Clade: Tracheophytes
- Clade: Angiosperms
- Clade: Eudicots
- Clade: Rosids
- Order: Fabales
- Family: Fabaceae
- Subfamily: Faboideae
- Genus: Lupinus
- Species: L. constancei

Binomial name
- Lupinus constancei T.W.Nelson & J.P.Nelson

= Lupinus constancei =

Species of plant

Lupinus constancei is a species of lupine known by the common name The Lassics lupine, or lassicus lupine. It is endemic to the U.S. state of California, where it is known from only fourteen occurrences in the Lassic Range in the North Coast Ranges. It is a member of the serpentine soils flora of the mountain forests. This is a low, mat-forming perennial herb no more than 15 centimeters high. Each small palmate leaf is made up of 6 or 7 leaflets up to 2 centimeters long and one wide. The herbage is coated in long, shaggy hairs. The inflorescence is a small, dense clump of several centimeter-long flowers. Each flower is pink in color with darker pink at the tip of the keel. The yellowish banner is reflexed. The fruit is a hairy legume pod 1.5 to 2.5 centimeters long.
