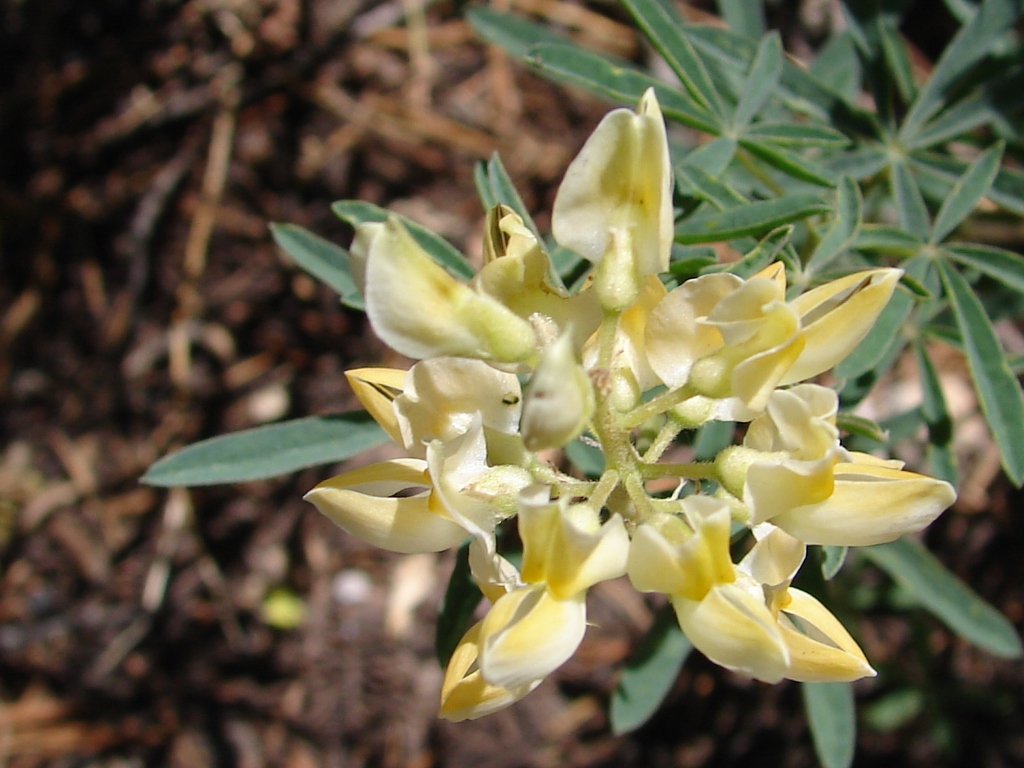

Scientific classification
- Kingdom: Plantae
- Clade: Embryophytes
- Clade: Tracheophytes
- Clade: Spermatophytes
- Clade: Angiosperms
- Clade: Eudicots
- Clade: Rosids
- Order: Fabales
- Family: Fabaceae
- Subfamily: Faboideae
- Genus: Lupinus
- Species: L. angustiflorus

Binomial name
- Lupinus angustiflorus S.Watson

= Lupinus angustiflorus =

Species of legume

Lupinus angustiflorus is a species of lupine known by the common name narrowflower lupine. It is endemic to California, where it grows in the volcanic soils of the northeastern mountains and Modoc Plateau, and native to the lower 48 U.S. states. It is an erect perennial herb sometimes exceeding one meter in height. Each palmate leaf is made up of 6 to 9 leaflets each up to 6 centimeters long. The inflorescence is up to 34 centimeters long, bearing many flowers each of which is roughly a centimeter long. The flower is cream to pale yellow-orange with a patch of deeper yellow or orange on its banner. The keeled lower petals may be tipped with lavender. The fruit is a hairy legume pod up to 4 centimeters long. The plant is glabrous to hairy.
