= Lupinus eremonomus =

Scientific classification
- Kingdom: Plantae
- Clade: Tracheophytes
- Clade: Angiosperms
- Clade: Eudicots
- Clade: Rosids
- Order: Fabales
- Family: Fabaceae
- Subfamily: Faboideae
- Genus: Lupinus
- Species: L. eremonomus

Binomial name
- Lupinus eremonomus C.P.Sm.

Species of plant

Lupinus eremonomus is a species of lupine native to Venezuela. It is a shrub that grows in the montane tropical biome.

It is commonly found in the months of August-November.
