= Lupinus calcensis =

Scientific classification
- Kingdom: Plantae
- Clade: Tracheophytes
- Clade: Angiosperms
- Clade: Eudicots
- Clade: Rosids
- Order: Fabales
- Family: Fabaceae
- Subfamily: Faboideae
- Genus: Lupinus
- Species: L. calcensis

Binomial name
- Lupinus calcensis C.P.Sm.

Species of plant native to South America

Lupinus calcensis is a flowering plant in the genus Lupinus. It is native to Peru and other areas of western South America.
