= Lupinus lemmonii =

Conservation status
- Critically Imperiled (NatureServe)

Scientific classification
- Kingdom: Plantae
- Clade: Tracheophytes
- Clade: Angiosperms
- Clade: Eudicots
- Clade: Rosids
- Order: Fabales
- Family: Fabaceae
- Subfamily: Faboideae
- Genus: Lupinus
- Species: L. lemmonii

Binomial name
- Lupinus lemmonii C.P.Sm, 1939

Species of plant

Lupinus lemmonii, commonly known as Lemmon's lupine, is a species of perennial plant in the family of Fabaceae that is native to Arizona.

== Description ==
Lupinus lemmonii grows up to 1 meter tall. Additionally, the colour of its flowers range from blue to purple or sometimes lavender. The stems are strigose below but glabrous or glabrescent above. The hairs on the stems and petioles are appressed. The alternate leaves are palmately compound with 5 to 10 leaflets. The leaflets are linear or oblanceolate, between 2 and 7 centimeters long, and either very acute or obtuse at the tips. The leaflets have silvery, silky hair on both sides. The flower's color ranges from light to dark blue or purple. The flowers are bilabiate and between 8 and 10 millimeters long. The petals banner has long, soft, silky hairs on the center of the back. The calyx is gibbous at the base and sometimes short-spurred on the upper side at the base. The stamens are monadelphous. The anthers are dimorphic, are alternately elongate and short, and are born in dense terminal racemes. The racemes are between 2 and 8 centimeters long. The fruits are flatted pods, between 2 and 3.5 centimeters long, and are usually constricted between the seeds. There are between 3 and 6 seeds. The bloom period is between the months of June, July, August, and September.

This species can be differentiated from the similar Lupinus argenteus by distribution alone, as L. lemmonii only occurs in the southern portions of the state at lower elevations. These two species can be mistaken for each other, but if there is silky hair on both sides, it is most likely L. lemmonii. It also looks similar to Lupinus palmeri, which can be differentiated by appressed hairs, as on L. palmeri stems and leaves are not appressed.
