= Lupinus mexicanus =

Scientific classification
- Kingdom: Plantae
- Clade: Embryophytes
- Clade: Tracheophytes
- Clade: Spermatophytes
- Clade: Angiosperms
- Clade: Eudicots
- Clade: Rosids
- Order: Fabales
- Family: Fabaceae
- Subfamily: Faboideae
- Genus: Lupinus
- Species: L. mexicanus

Binomial name
- Lupinus mexicanus Cerv. ex Lag (1816)

Species of lupine

Lupinus mexicanus, also known as the Mexican lupin, is a plant species of lupine native to Mexico and introduced in Malawi, Tanzania, and Zimbabwe. Some sources say it was introduced to India, too.

== Uses ==
A 2014 paper found that flavonoid profiles of Mexican lupine seeds had a neuroprotective effects on rats. It was found that the germinated seeds had no impact on the brain neurons.

Another 2014 paper about genotoxicity in Lupinus species, specifically Lupinus mexicanus and Lupinus montanus, found that both of the species showed significant genotoxic activity. It also found that the Mexican lupine had more genotoxic activity than Lupinus montanus.

== Distribution and habitat ==
Its flowering period is March and April. It is usually found in the altitudes of 900–1450 meters. Its habitat is damp places, usually along rivers or seasonally flooded places.

Introduced in Zimbabwe as a garden ornamental, some plants escaped in October 1970. Now it is commonplace to see them on roadsides.

== Description ==
Either an annual or short lived perennial plant, it can get up to 1 meter high. The stem is villous with very long hairs. There are 7–9 leaflets, which are oblanceolate or narrowly oblong-elliptic. The petioles are 7–16 centimeters, and the stipules are 1–3 centimeters long. There are eight calyces, which are 10–12 millimeters long and come in the colors of blue or pink.
