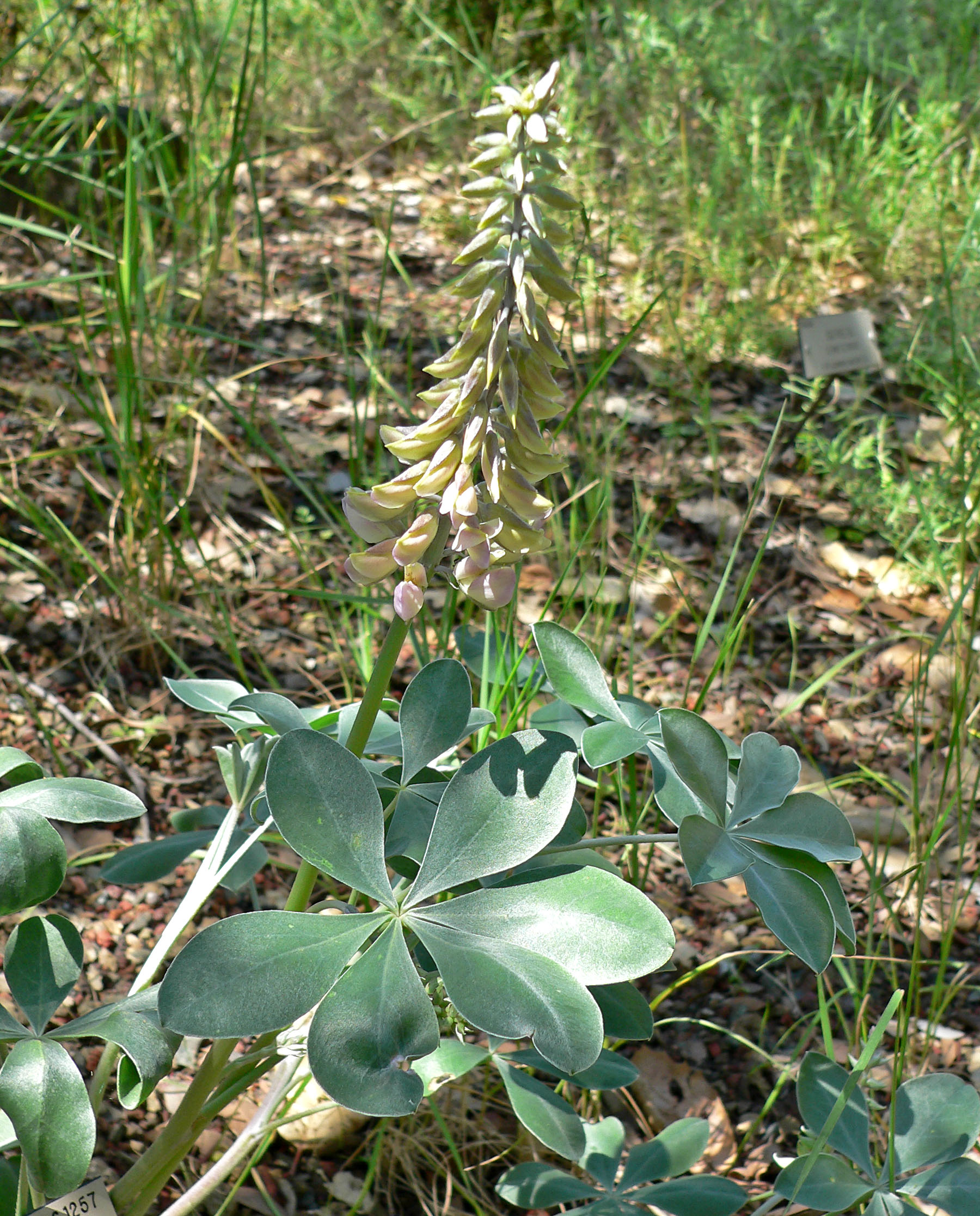

Conservation status
- Imperiled (NatureServe)

Scientific classification
- Kingdom: Plantae
- Clade: Tracheophytes
- Clade: Angiosperms
- Clade: Eudicots
- Clade: Rosids
- Order: Fabales
- Family: Fabaceae
- Subfamily: Faboideae
- Genus: Lupinus
- Species: L. sericatus

Binomial name
- Lupinus sericatus Kellogg

= Lupinus sericatus =

Species of legume

Lupinus sericatus is a species of lupine known by the common name Cobb Mountain lupine. It is endemic to the North Coast Ranges of California north of the San Francisco Bay Area, where it grows in the forest, woodlands, and chaparral of the slopes and canyons. It easily colonizes disturbed habitat as well. This is a perennial herb growing up to half a meter tall. Each palmate leaf is made up of 4 to 7 distinctive wide spoon-shaped leaflets each 3 to 5 centimeters long. The inflorescence is a raceme of several whorls of purple flowers, each flower between 1 and 2 centimeters long. The fruit is a hairy legume pod 2 or 3 centimeters long.
