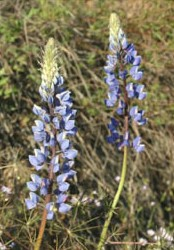

Scientific classification
- Kingdom: Plantae
- Clade: Tracheophytes
- Clade: Angiosperms
- Clade: Eudicots
- Clade: Rosids
- Order: Fabales
- Family: Fabaceae
- Subfamily: Faboideae
- Genus: Lupinus
- Species: L. benthamii

Binomial name
- Lupinus benthamii A.Heller

= Lupinus benthamii =

Species of legume

Lupinus benthamii is a species of lupine known by the common name spider lupine.

== Distribution ==
The plant is endemic to central California, where it is known from the Central Coast Ranges across the Central Valley into the Sierra Nevada foothills. It is common in some areas, covering hillsides with its blue blooms in the spring.

== Description ==
Lupinus benthamii is a hairy annual herb growing 20–70 centimetres (7.9–27.6 in) tall. Each palmate leaf is made up of 7 to 10 leaflets each up to 5 centimetres (2.0 in) long. They are narrow and linear in shape, just a few millimeters wide.

The inflorescence is an erect raceme of flowers up to 30 centimetres (12 in) tall, the flowers sometimes arranged in whorls. The flower is between 1 and 2 centimeters long and bright to deep blue in color, generally with a white or pink spot on the banner, or upper petal.

The fruit is a hairy legume pod about 3 centimetres (1.2 in) long.
