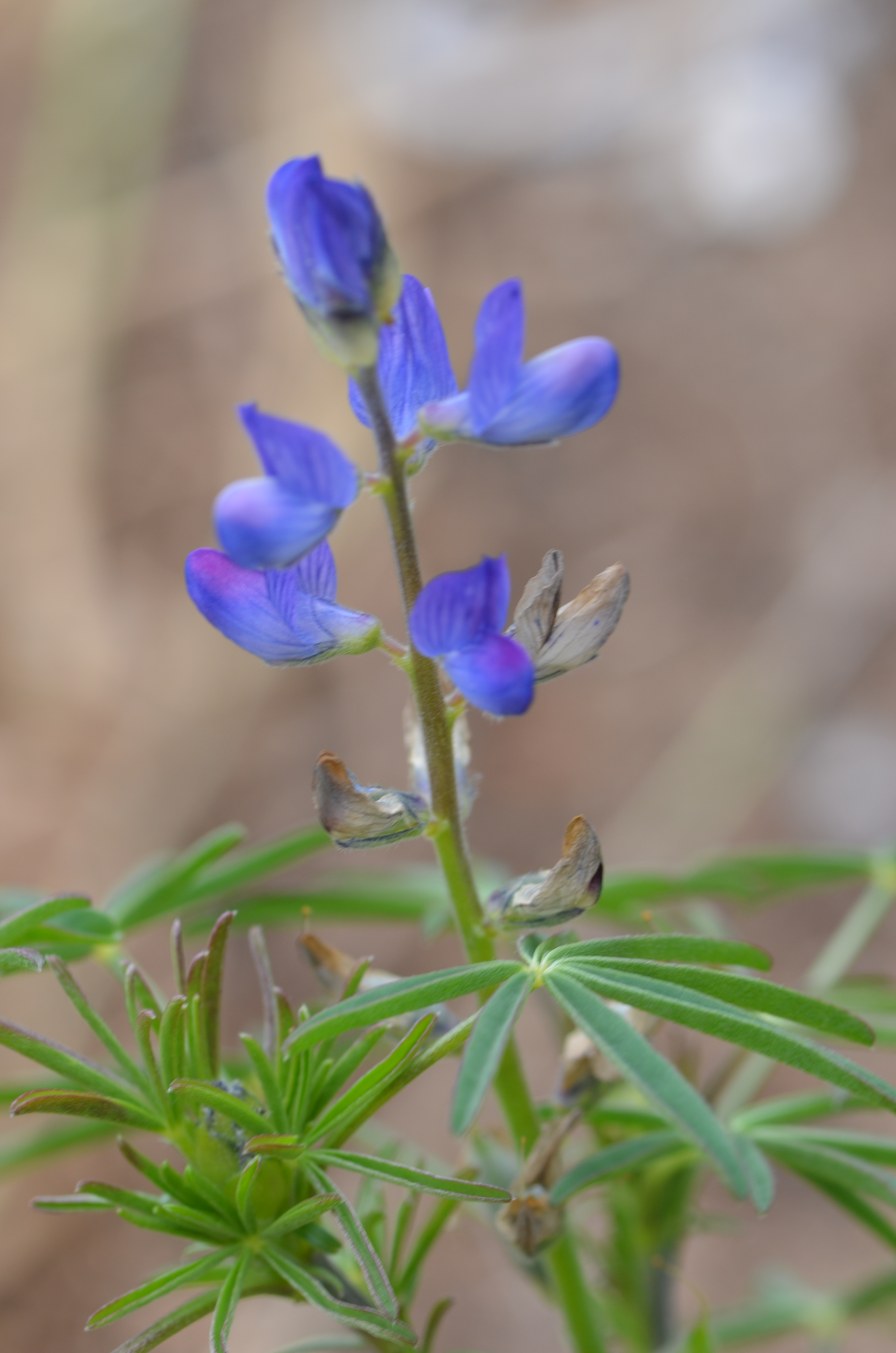

Scientific classification
- Kingdom: Plantae
- Clade: Tracheophytes
- Clade: Angiosperms
- Clade: Eudicots
- Clade: Rosids
- Order: Fabales
- Family: Fabaceae
- Subfamily: Faboideae
- Genus: Lupinus
- Species: L. cosentinii

Binomial name
- Lupinus cosentinii Guss. 1828

Synonyms
- Lupinus consentini Walp. 1828; Lupinus pilosus var. velutinus Maire 1932; Lupinus velutinus Pau 1932

= Lupinus cosentinii =

Species of plant

Lupinus cosentinii, or sand lupine, is a species of Lupinus found in Algeria, Corse, Italy, Libya, Morocco, Portugal, Sardegna, Sicilia, Spain, and Tunisia.
