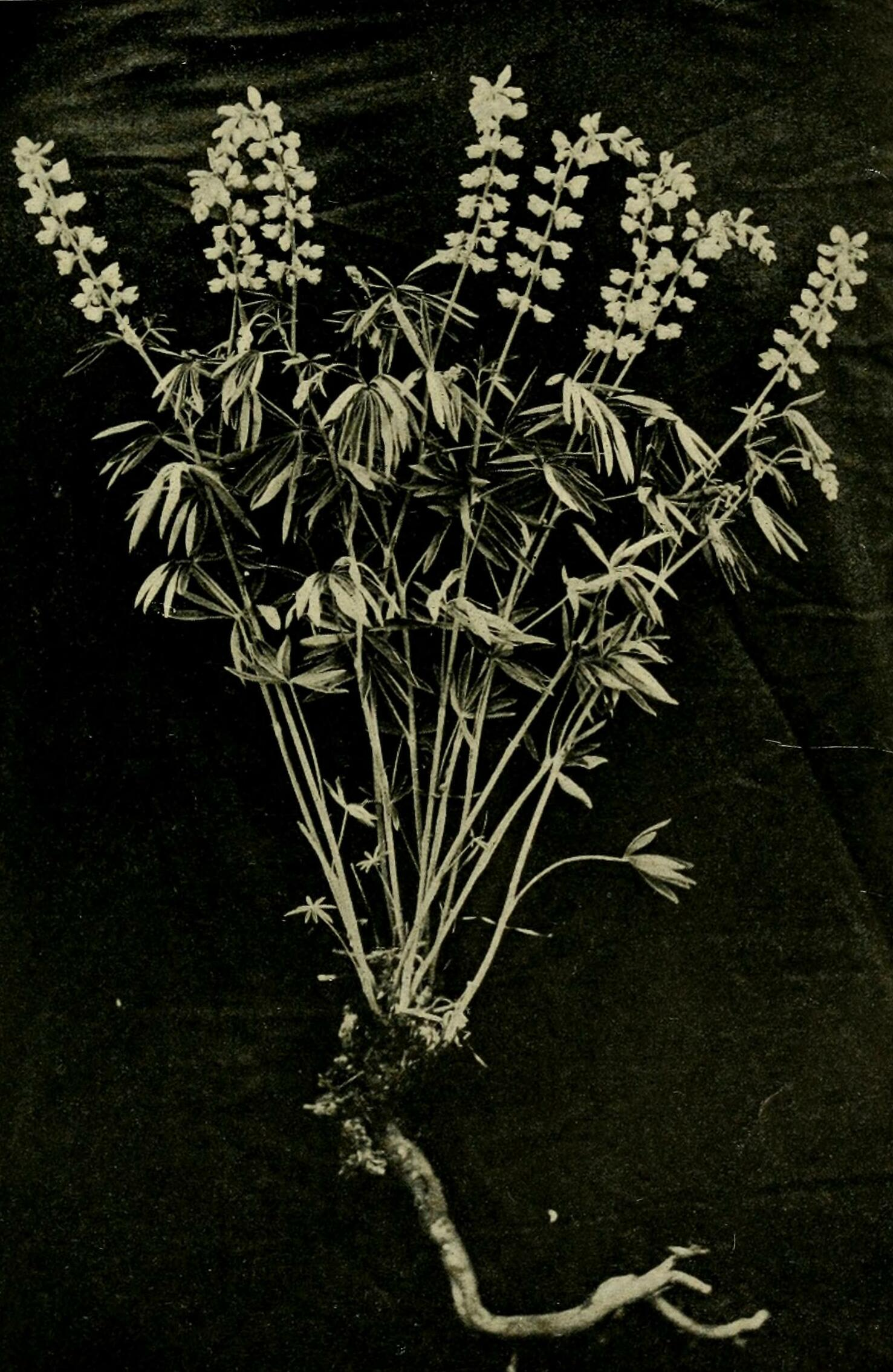

Conservation status
- Secure (NatureServe)

Scientific classification
- Kingdom: Plantae
- Clade: Tracheophytes
- Clade: Angiosperms
- Clade: Eudicots
- Clade: Rosids
- Order: Fabales
- Family: Fabaceae
- Subfamily: Faboideae
- Genus: Lupinus
- Species: L. holosericeus

Binomial name
- Lupinus holosericeus Nutt.

= Lupinus holosericeus =

Species of plant

Lupinus holosericeus, commonly known as the holo lupine or Nuttall's silky lupine, is a species of lupine native to Oregon, Idaho, Nevada, Utah, and Colorado.

They can be found in gravelly areas, sagebrush, and meadows. It flowers between the months of May to June. Its elevation range is between 900 and 1900 meters.
