= Lupinus affinis =

Conservation status
- Secure (NatureServe)

Scientific classification
- Kingdom: Plantae
- Clade: Tracheophytes
- Clade: Angiosperms
- Clade: Eudicots
- Clade: Rosids
- Order: Fabales
- Family: Fabaceae
- Subfamily: Faboideae
- Genus: Lupinus
- Species: L. affinis

Binomial name
- Lupinus affinis J.Agardh
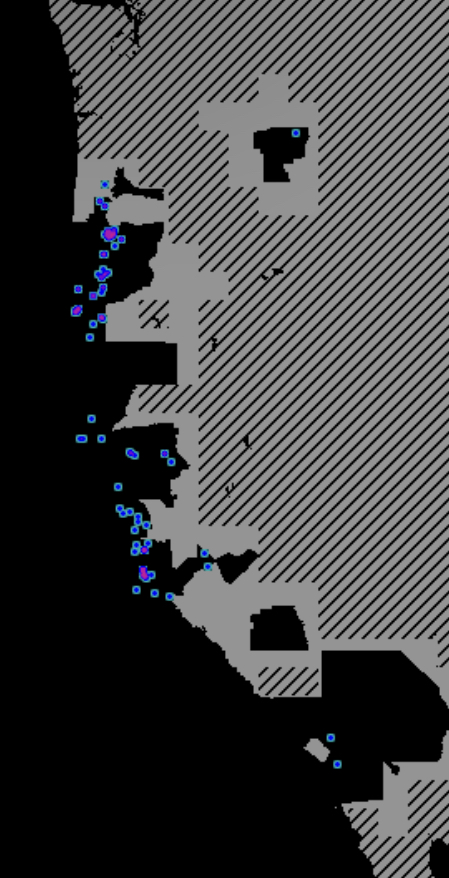

Species of legume

Lupinus affinis is a species of lupine known by the common name fleshy lupine. It is native to the California Coast Ranges from the San Francisco Bay Area north, and into southern Oregon, where it is an uncommon member of the flora in several areas.

== Description ==
It is a hairy annual herb growing 20 to 50 centimetres (8 to 20 in) in height. Each palmate leaf is made up of 5 to 8 leaflets each up to 5 centimetres (2 inches) long. The inflorescence is up to 20 centimetres (8 in) long, bearing whorls of flowers each about 1 centimetre (1/3 in) long. The flower is purple-blue with a whitish patch on the banner. The fruit is a hairy legume pod up to 5 centimetres (2 in) long containing 5-8 seeds. It’s bloom period is between the months of March, April and May. The leafs are alternate. The flowers color is either white or blue. It is found commonly in the elevations of between 0-2,000 feet.
