= Lupinus meionanthus =

Scientific classification
- Kingdom: Plantae
- Clade: Tracheophytes
- Clade: Angiosperms
- Clade: Eudicots
- Clade: Rosids
- Order: Fabales
- Family: Fabaceae
- Subfamily: Faboideae
- Genus: Lupinus
- Species: L. meionanthus

Binomial name
- Lupinus meionanthus A. Gray

Species of legume

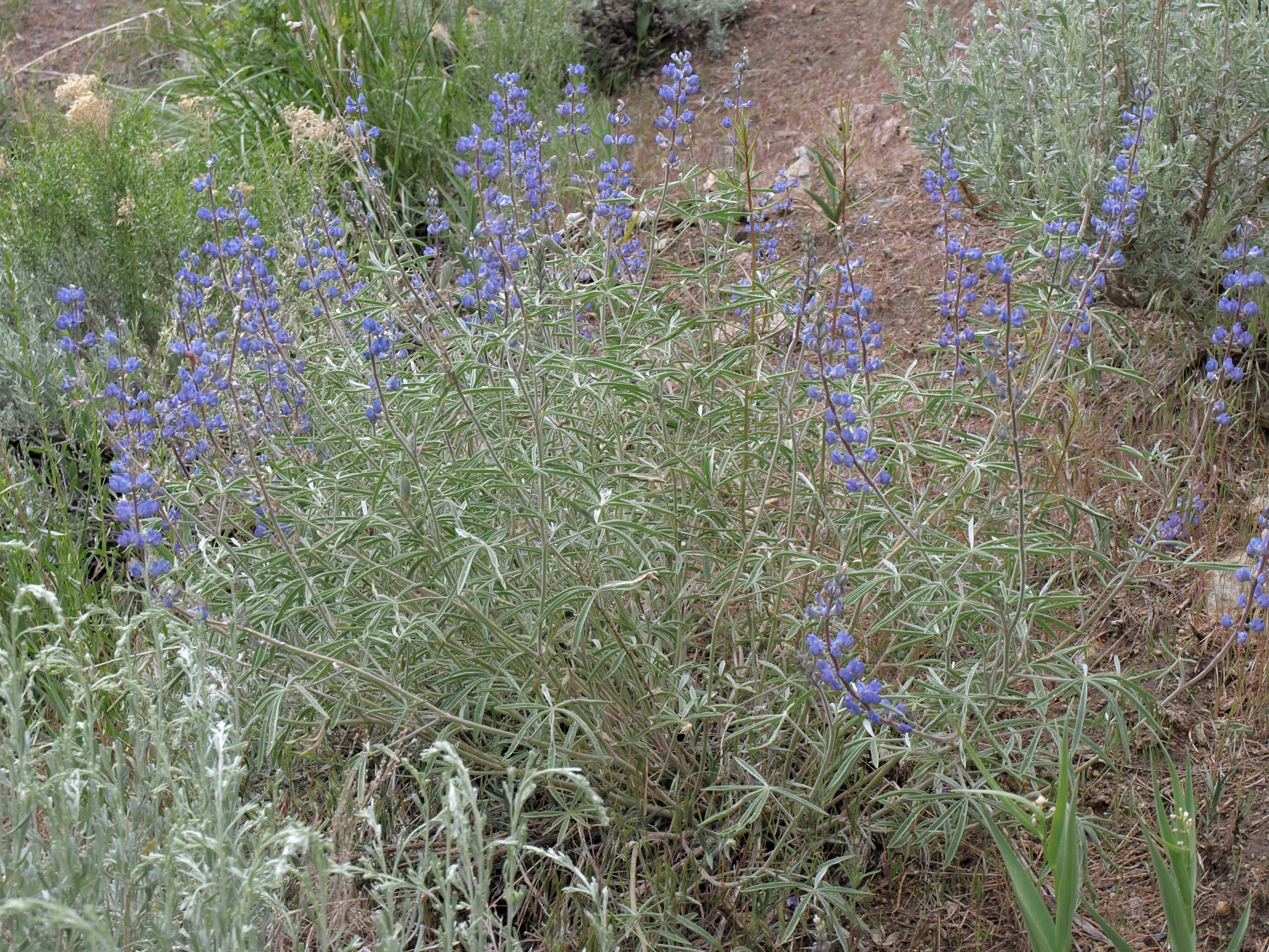
Lupinus argenteus var. meionanthus plant

Lupinus meionanthus, commonly known as Lake Tahoe lupine, is a species of flowering plant from the order of Lamiales which can be found in Nevada and California, and in the latter it can be found in Yosemite National Park.
