= Lupinus nubigenus =

Conservation status
- Least Concern (IUCN 3.1)

Scientific classification
- Kingdom: Plantae
- Clade: Tracheophytes
- Clade: Angiosperms
- Clade: Eudicots
- Clade: Rosids
- Order: Fabales
- Family: Fabaceae
- Subfamily: Faboideae
- Genus: Lupinus
- Species: L. nubigenus

Binomial name
- Lupinus nubigenus Kunth

Species of legume

Lupinus nubigenus is a species of legume in the family Fabaceae. It is found only in Ecuador. Its natural habitat is subtropical or tropical high-altitude grassland.
