= Lupinus fulcratus =

Scientific classification
- Kingdom: Plantae
- Clade: Tracheophytes
- Clade: Angiosperms
- Clade: Eudicots
- Clade: Rosids
- Order: Fabales
- Family: Fabaceae
- Subfamily: Faboideae
- Genus: Lupinus
- Species: L. fulcratus

Binomial name
- Lupinus fulcratus Greene

Species of legume

Lupinus fulcratus, the greenstipule lupine, is a species of flowering plant from the order of Fabales which is native to Nevada and California, where it is found in Sequoia and Kings Canyon National Parks.
