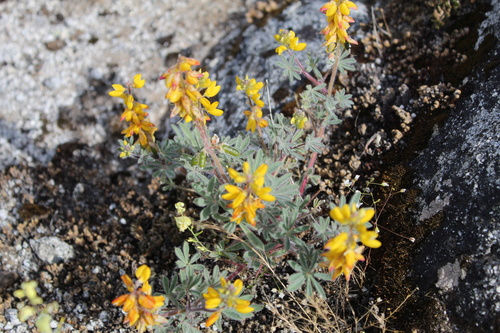

Conservation status
- Imperiled (NatureServe)

Scientific classification
- Kingdom: Plantae
- Clade: Tracheophytes
- Clade: Angiosperms
- Clade: Eudicots
- Clade: Rosids
- Order: Fabales
- Family: Fabaceae
- Subfamily: Faboideae
- Genus: Lupinus
- Species: L. citrinus

Binomial name
- Lupinus citrinus Kellogg

= Lupinus citrinus =

Species of legume

Lupinus citrinus is a species of lupine known by the common names orange lupine, orangeflower lupine, and fragrant lupine. It is endemic to California, where it is known from a section of the Sierra Nevada foothills extending from Mariposa to Fresno Counties. This is an annual herb growing 10–60 centimetres (3.9–23.6 in) tall. Each palmate leaf is made up of 6 to 9 leaflets up to 3.5 centimetres (1.4 in) long. The herbage is coated in tiny white hairs. The inflorescence bears several flowers, sometimes in whorls. Each flower is roughly a centimeter long and orange to yellow to white in color. The fruit is a legume pod 1 or 2 centimetres (0.79 in) long containing seeds which resemble "pieces of granite."
