= Lupinus amandus =

Conservation status
- Least Concern (IUCN 3.1)

Scientific classification
- Kingdom: Plantae
- Clade: Tracheophytes
- Clade: Angiosperms
- Clade: Eudicots
- Clade: Rosids
- Order: Fabales
- Family: Fabaceae
- Subfamily: Faboideae
- Genus: Lupinus
- Species: L. amandus

Binomial name
- Lupinus amandus C.P.Sm

Species of lupine

Lupinus amandus, commonly known as chocho, is a species of lupine native to Colombia. It grows in the mountains between the elevation ranges of 2700-3800 meters.
