= Lupinus elatus =

Scientific classification
- Kingdom: Plantae
- Clade: Tracheophytes
- Clade: Angiosperms
- Clade: Eudicots
- Clade: Rosids
- Order: Fabales
- Family: Fabaceae
- Subfamily: Faboideae
- Genus: Lupinus
- Species: L. elatus

Binomial name
- Lupinus elatus I.M.Johnst.

Species of legume

Lupinus elatus is a species of lupine known by the common name tall silky lupine. It is endemic to California, where it is known from the Transverse Ranges above Los Angeles, and possibly also from the southernmost slopes of the Sierra Nevada. Its habitat includes dry areas in the forests of the mountains. This is an erect perennial herb reaching a maximum height near 90 centimeters. Each palmate leaf is made up of 6 to 8 leaflets up to 8 centimeters long. The herbage is coated in silvery silky to woolly hairs. The inflorescence is a long raceme of flowers, each about a centimeter long and arranged in whorls. The flower is purple or blue with a pale yellow patch on its banner. It yields a legume pod 2 or 3 centimeters long. This is a host plant to the Southern California native butterfly subspecies known as the San Gabriel Mountains Arrowhead Blue (Glaucopsyche piasus ssp. gabrielina).
