= Lupinus nevadensis =

Scientific classification
- Kingdom: Plantae
- Clade: Tracheophytes
- Clade: Angiosperms
- Clade: Eudicots
- Clade: Rosids
- Order: Fabales
- Family: Fabaceae
- Subfamily: Faboideae
- Genus: Lupinus
- Species: L. nevadensis

Binomial name
- Lupinus nevadensis A.Heller

Species of legume

Lupinus nevadensis is a species of lupine known by the common name Nevada lupine. It is native to the western Great Basin in Nevada and adjacent sections of Oregon and California, where it grows in sagebrush and other typical basin habitat. It is an erect perennial herb growing 10 to 40 centimeters tall. Each palmate leaf is made up of 6 to 10 hairy leaflets up to 5 centimeters long. The stem and herbage are coated in long hairs. The inflorescence is a spiral of flowers each around 1 centimeter in length. The flower is blue with a whitish patch on its banner and a curved keel. The fruit is a very hairy legume pod up to 4 centimeters long.
