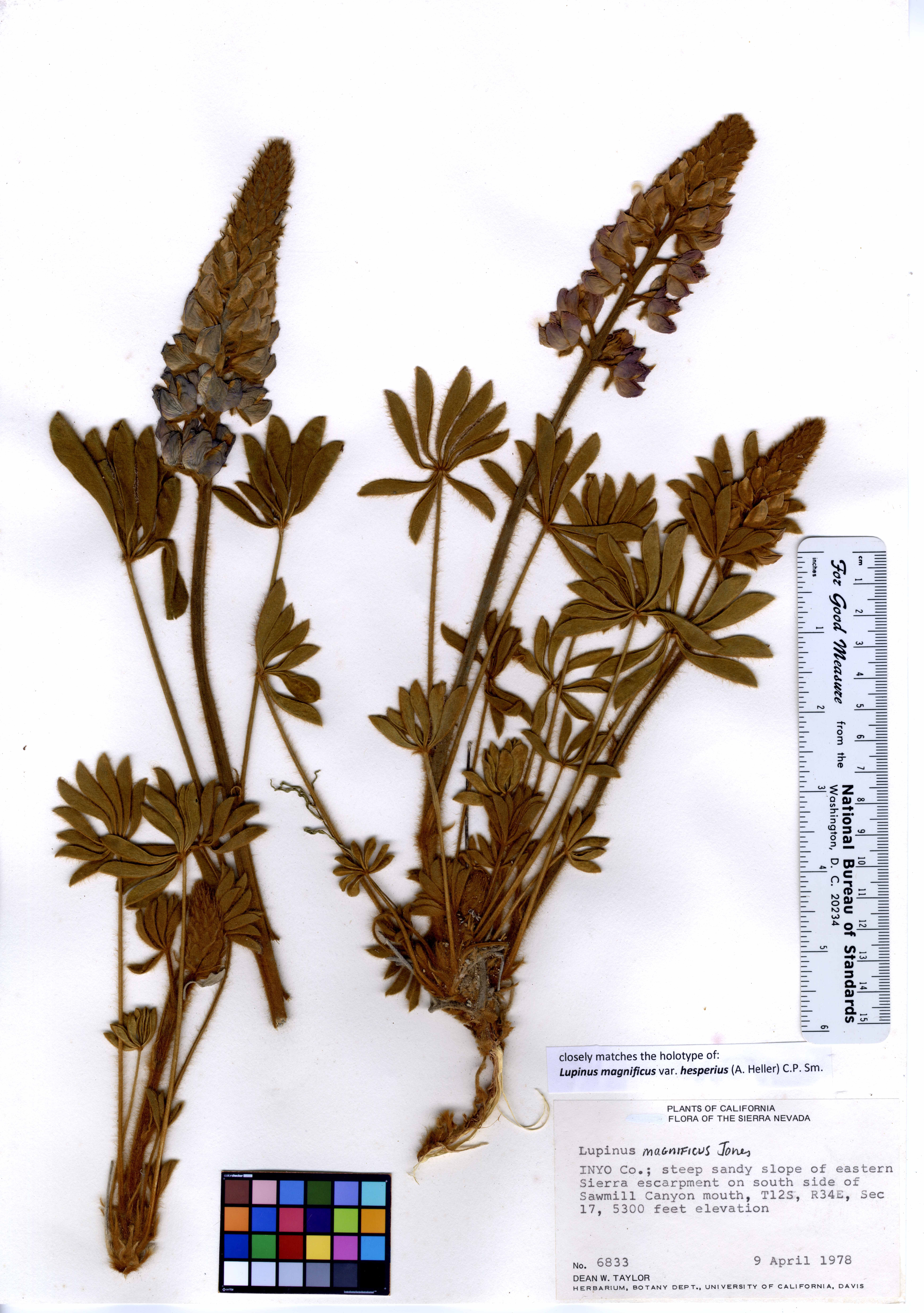

Scientific classification
- Kingdom: Plantae
- Clade: Tracheophytes
- Clade: Angiosperms
- Clade: Eudicots
- Clade: Rosids
- Order: Fabales
- Family: Fabaceae
- Subfamily: Faboideae
- Genus: Lupinus
- Species: L. magnificus

Binomial name
- Lupinus magnificus M.E. Jones

= Lupinus magnificus =

Species of legume

Lupinus magnificus, commonly known as Panamint Mountain lupine, is a species of flowering plant from the order of Lamiales.

The plant is endemic to California, within Death Valley National Park in Death Valley and the Panamint Range.
