= Lupinus adsurgens =

Conservation status
- Secure (NatureServe)

Scientific classification
- Kingdom: Plantae
- Clade: Tracheophytes
- Clade: Angiosperms
- Clade: Eudicots
- Clade: Rosids
- Order: Fabales
- Family: Fabaceae
- Subfamily: Faboideae
- Genus: Lupinus
- Species: L. adsurgens

Binomial name
- Lupinus adsurgens E. Drew

Species of plant

Lupinus adsurgens is a species of lupine known by the common name Drew's silky lupine. It is native to the Sierra Nevada and coastal mountain ranges of northern California and southern Oregon, where it grows in forest and other mountain habitat.

== Description ==
It is a perennial herb growing 20–60 centimetres (7.9–23.6 in) in height. Each palmate leaf is made up of 6 to 9 leaflets each up to 5 centimetres (2.0 in) long. The herbage is hairy and silvery or gray-green in color. The inflorescence is up to 23 centimetres (9.1 in) long, bearing flowers just over a centimeter long. The flower is pale pink or purple to yellowish with a white or yellow patch on the banner. The fruit is a silky-haired legume pod 2 to 4 centimetres (1.6 in) long containing 3 to 6 seeds. Its bloom period is between the months of May, June, and July.
