= Lupinus lanatus =

Scientific classification
- Kingdom: Plantae
- Clade: Tracheophytes
- Clade: Angiosperms
- Clade: Eudicots
- Clade: Rosids
- Order: Fabales
- Family: Fabaceae
- Subfamily: Faboideae
- Genus: Lupinus
- Species: L. lanatus

Binomial name
- Lupinus lanatus Benth.

Species of flowering plant

Lupinus lanatus is a species of flowering plant in the genus of Lupinus. It is a herbaceous, perennial or occasionally biennial plant with basal leaves.

== Habitat ==
Lupinus lanatus is found in southeastern Brazil and northeastern Argentina, but it is also found in Uruguay. It grows primarily in the subtropical biome.
