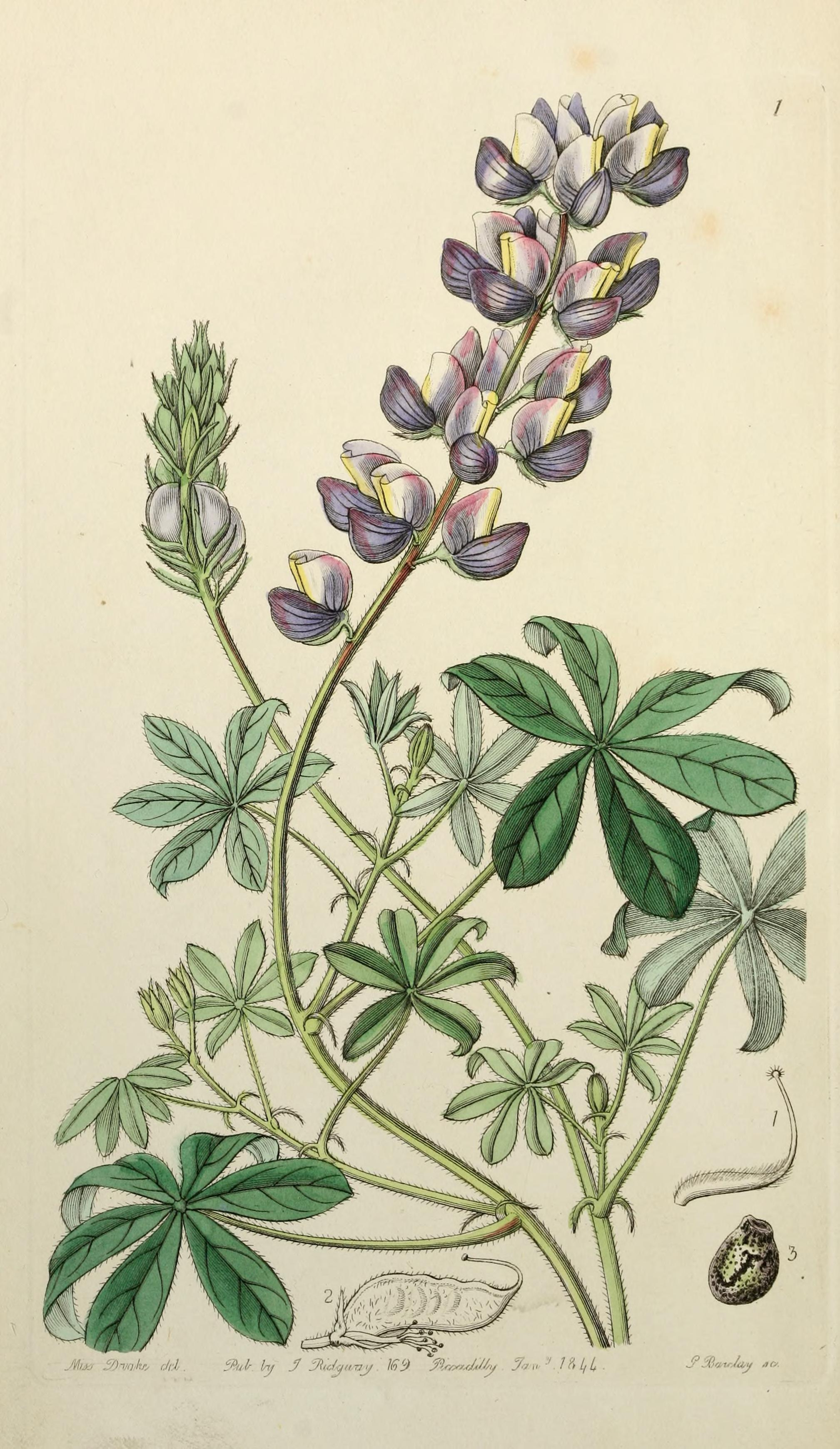

Scientific classification
- Kingdom: Plantae
- Clade: Tracheophytes
- Clade: Angiosperms
- Clade: Eudicots
- Clade: Rosids
- Order: Fabales
- Family: Fabaceae
- Subfamily: Faboideae
- Genus: Lupinus
- Species: L. arvensis

Binomial name
- Lupinus arvensis Benth.

= Lupinus arvensis =

Species of plant

Lupinus arvensis is a species of lupine that is native to Colombia, Ecuador, and Venezuela. It is a subshrub that grows in a montane tropical biome.
