= Lupinus jaimehintonianus =

Conservation status
- Endangered (IUCN 3.1)

Scientific classification
- Kingdom: Plantae
- Clade: Tracheophytes
- Clade: Angiosperms
- Clade: Eudicots
- Clade: Rosids
- Order: Fabales
- Family: Fabaceae
- Subfamily: Faboideae
- Genus: Lupinus
- Species: L. jaimehintonianus

Binomial name
- Lupinus jaimehintonianus B.L.Turner

Species of lupine

Lupinus jaimehintonianus, commonly known as chepil de la lluvia in Spanish, is a species of lupine that is native to southwest Mexico.

== Taxonomy ==
Lupinus jaimehintonianus was named after James "Jamie" Hinton, a botanist who documented around 200 plant species, mainly in Mexico.

== Distribution and habitat ==
It is mostly found in the months of August and October.
