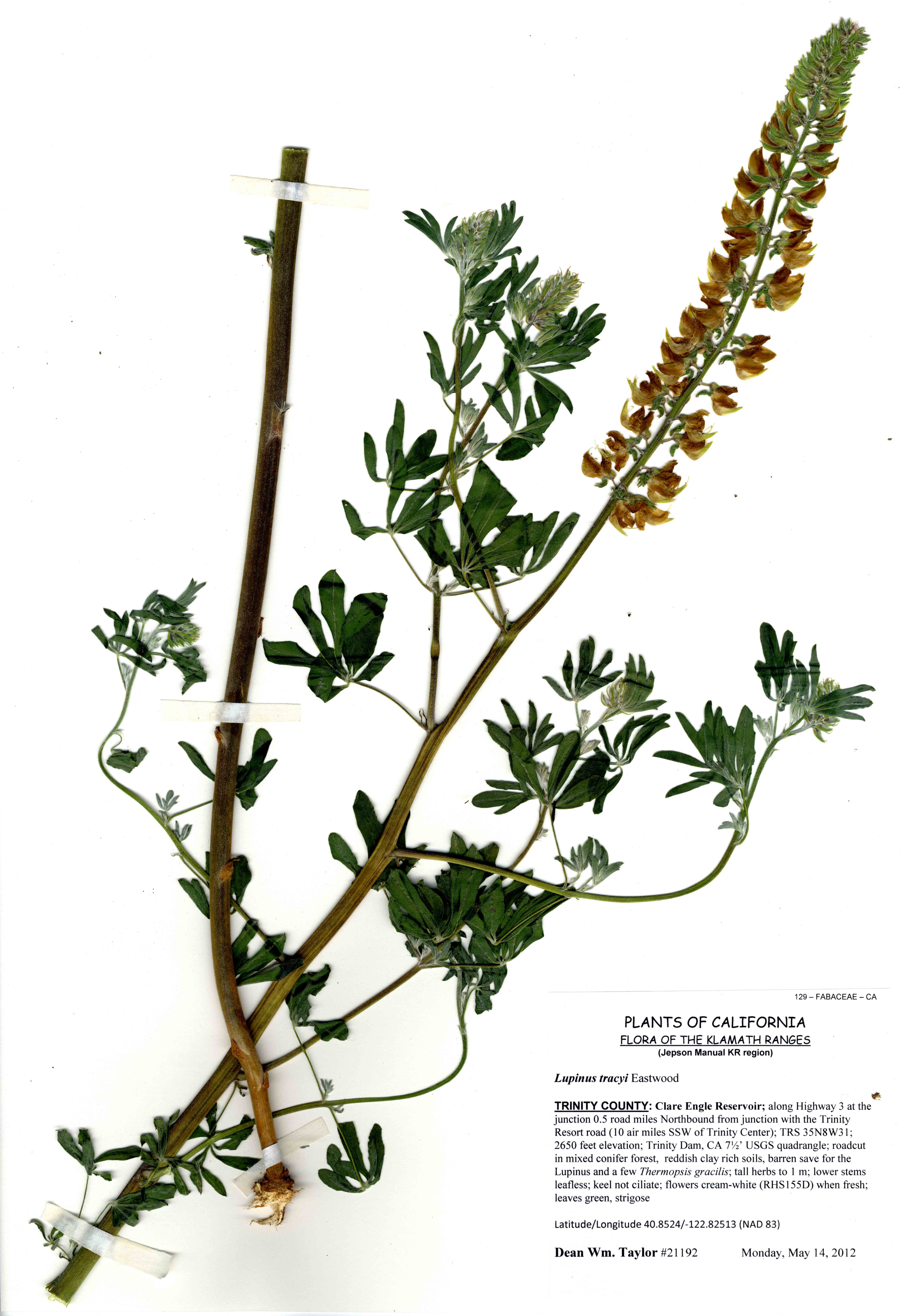

Scientific classification
- Kingdom: Plantae
- Clade: Tracheophytes
- Clade: Angiosperms
- Clade: Eudicots
- Clade: Rosids
- Order: Fabales
- Family: Fabaceae
- Subfamily: Faboideae
- Genus: Lupinus
- Species: L. tracyi

Binomial name
- Lupinus tracyi Eastw.

= Lupinus tracyi =

Species of legume

Lupinus tracyi is a species of lupine known by the common name Tracy's lupine. It is endemic to the Klamath Mountains of southern Oregon and northern California, where it grows in coniferous forests. It is a perennial herb growing 20 to 70 centimeters tall and is mostly hairless in texture, with a thin, waxy stem. Each palmate leaf is made up of 6 or 7 leaflets measuring 1 to 4 centimeters in length. The inflorescence is a raceme of many flowers, sometimes arranged in whorls. The flower is around a centimeter long and is pale blue to whitish in color. The fruit is a hairy legume pod roughly 2 centimeters long which darkens as it dries.
