= Lupinus kunthii =

Conservation status
- Data Deficient (IUCN 3.1)

Scientific classification
- Kingdom: Plantae
- Clade: Tracheophytes
- Clade: Angiosperms
- Clade: Eudicots
- Clade: Rosids
- Order: Fabales
- Family: Fabaceae
- Subfamily: Faboideae
- Genus: Lupinus
- Species: L. kunthii

Binomial name
- Lupinus kunthii J.Agardh

Synonyms
- Lupinus microphyllus Kunth, nom. illeg.; Lupinus microphyllus var. kunthii (J.Agardh) C.P.Sm., not validly publ.

Species of legume

Lupinus kunthii is a species of legume in the family Fabaceae. It is endemic to Ecuador. Its natural habitat is subtropical or tropical high-altitude grassland.
