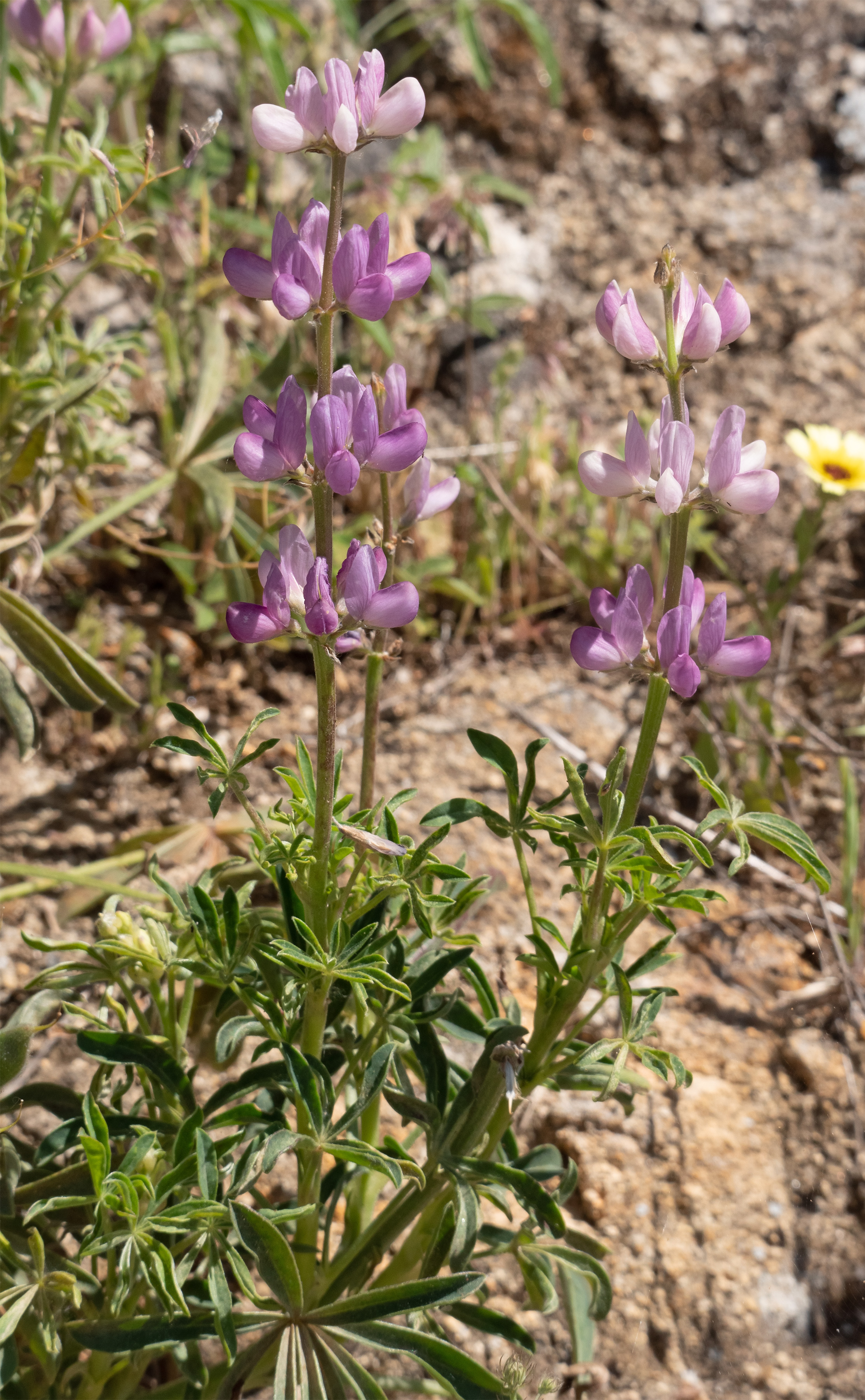

Scientific classification
- Kingdom: Plantae
- Clade: Embryophytes
- Clade: Tracheophytes
- Clade: Spermatophytes
- Clade: Angiosperms
- Clade: Eudicots
- Clade: Rosids
- Order: Fabales
- Family: Fabaceae
- Subfamily: Faboideae
- Genus: Lupinus
- Species: L. hispanicus

Binomial name
- Lupinus hispanicus Boiss. et Reut.

= Lupinus hispanicus =

Species of plant

Lupinus hispanicus, commonly known as the Spanish lupine, is a species of lupine native to Iberia.

The Spanish lupine has an elevation range of 25 to 1063 meters. Some accessions could be really good grain and some could be used to forage.
