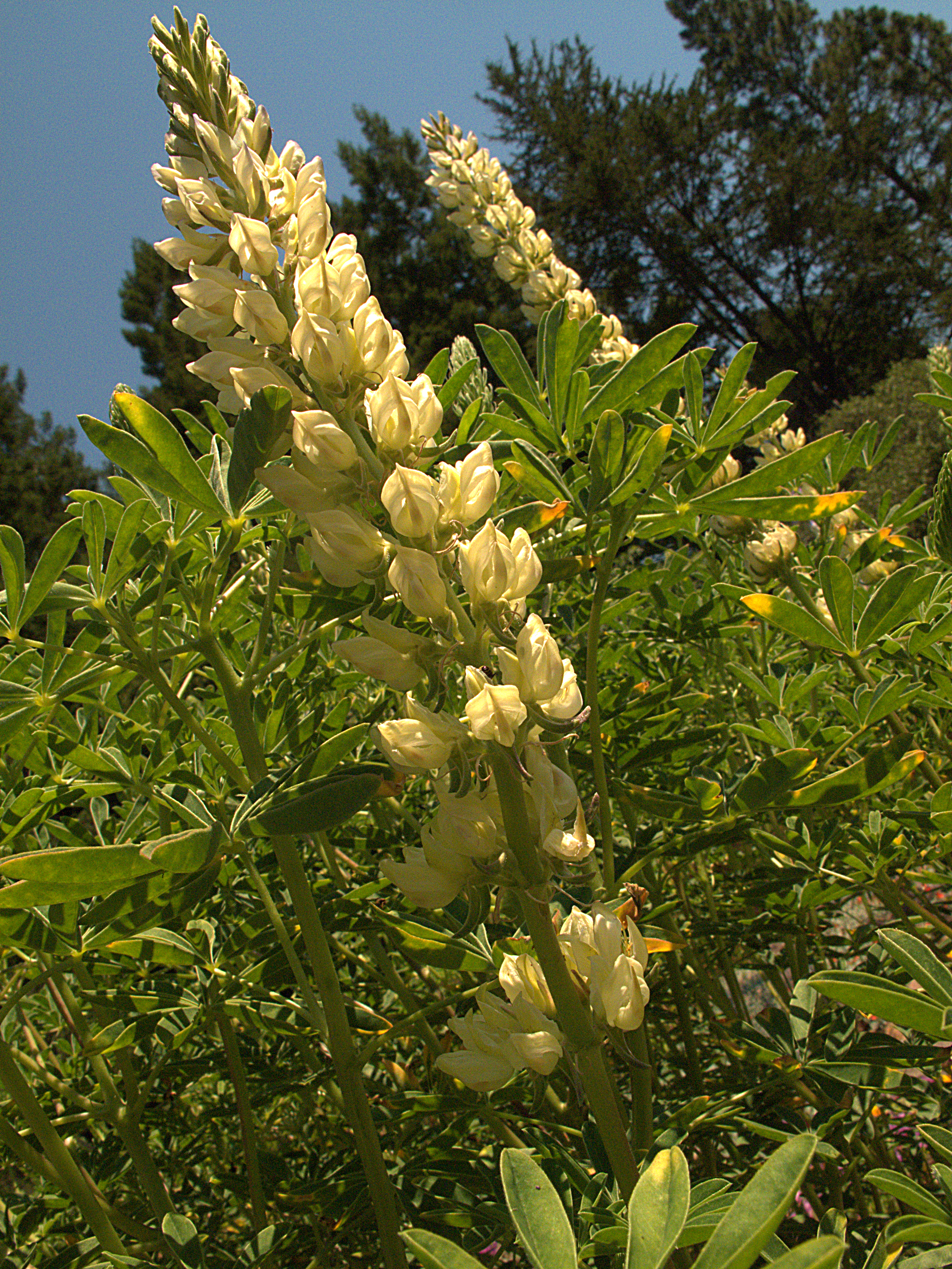

Scientific classification
- Kingdom: Plantae
- Clade: Tracheophytes
- Clade: Angiosperms
- Clade: Eudicots
- Clade: Rosids
- Order: Fabales
- Family: Fabaceae
- Subfamily: Faboideae
- Genus: Lupinus
- Species: L. luteolus

Binomial name
- Lupinus luteolus Kellogg

Synonyms
- Lupinus milo-bakeri C.P.Sm.

= Lupinus luteolus =

Species of legume

Lupinus luteolus is a species of lupine known by the common names pale yellow lupine and butter lupine. It is native to the coastal mountain ranges of Oregon and California as far south as the Transverse Ranges, where it grows in open habitat such as clearings and sometimes disturbed areas. It is an annual herb with a rigid stem growing to maximum heights anywhere between 30 centimeters and 1.5 meters, and known to exceed that at times. Each palmate leaf is made up of 7 to 9 hairy leaflets 1 to 3 centimeters long. The inflorescence is a raceme of crowded whorls of flowers each just over a centimeter long. The flower is often pale to bright yellow, but can be blue or pinkish. The fruit is a hairy, rounded or oval legume pod generally containing 2 seeds.
