= Lupinus apertus =

Scientific classification
- Kingdom: Plantae
- Clade: Tracheophytes
- Clade: Angiosperms
- Clade: Eudicots
- Clade: Rosids
- Order: Fabales
- Family: Fabaceae
- Subfamily: Faboideae
- Genus: Lupinus
- Species: L. apertus

Binomial name
- Lupinus apertus A. Heller

Species of legume

Lupinus apertus, summit lupine, is a species of flowering plant from the order of Lamiales which is native to Nevada and California.
