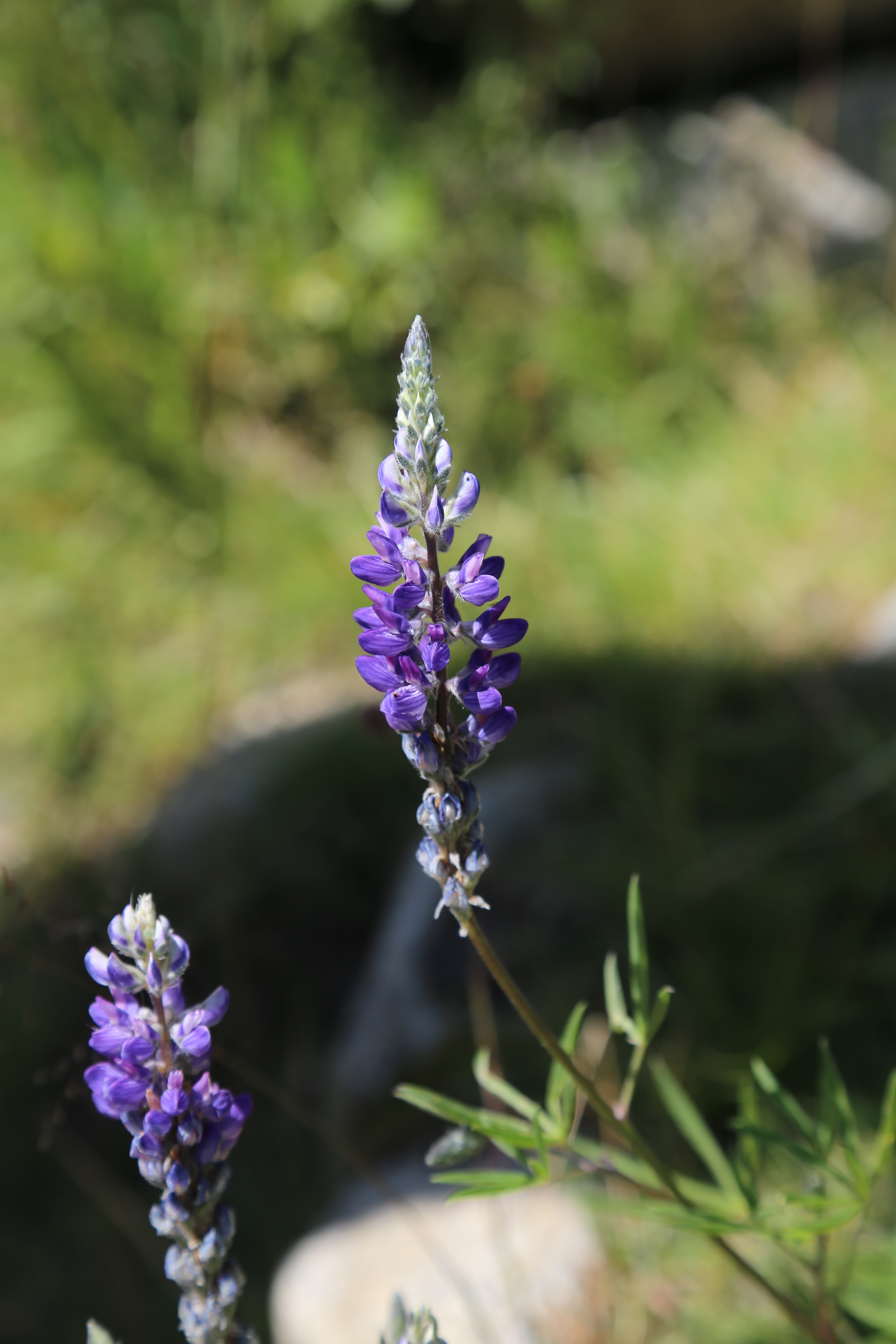

Scientific classification
- Kingdom: Plantae
- Clade: Tracheophytes
- Clade: Angiosperms
- Clade: Eudicots
- Clade: Rosids
- Order: Fabales
- Family: Fabaceae
- Subfamily: Faboideae
- Genus: Lupinus
- Species: L. pratensis

Binomial name
- Lupinus pratensis A.Heller

= Lupinus pratensis =

Species of legume

Lupinus pratensis is a species of lupine known by the common name Inyo meadow lupine. It is endemic to California, where it grows in the central Sierra Nevada and adjacent plateau and valleys to the east. It grows in relatively moist habitat, such as streambanks and spring meadows. This is an erect perennial herb growing 30–70 centimetres (12–28 in) tall. Each palmate leaf is made up of 5 to 10 narrow leaflets sometimes exceeding 10 centimetres (3.9 in) long. The leaves are borne on long petioles which can reach 25 centimetres (9.8 in) in length. The herbage is green and coated in thin hairs. The inflorescence is a dense raceme of many flowers each around a centimeter long. The flower is dark blue or purple with a reddish or orange patch on its banner. The fruit is a hairy legume pod around 2 centimetres (0.79 in) long.

There are two varieties of this species; the rarer, variety, eriostachyus, is known only from the drainage of Big Pine Creek in Inyo County.
