= Lupinus grayi =

Scientific classification
- Kingdom: Plantae
- Clade: Tracheophytes
- Clade: Angiosperms
- Clade: Eudicots
- Clade: Rosids
- Order: Fabales
- Family: Fabaceae
- Subfamily: Faboideae
- Genus: Lupinus
- Species: L. grayi

Binomial name
- Lupinus grayi S.Watson

Species of legume

Lupinus grayi is a species of lupine known by the common name Sierra lupine. It is endemic to California, where its distribution extends the length of the Sierra Nevada and its foothills and includes the Tehachapi Mountains.

It is a common plant of the mountain forests, where it sometimes carpets meadows with its woolly green herbage and purple flower spikes. This is a low, prostrate perennial herb forming spreading mats 20 or 30 centimeters high. Each palmate leaf is made up of 5 to 11 leaflets up to 3.5 centimeters long.

The inflorescence bears dense whorls of flowers each just over a centimeter long. Each flower is purple or blue with a yellow or reddish patch on the banner. The fruit is a hairy legume pod which is up to 3.5 centimetres (1.4 in) in length.
