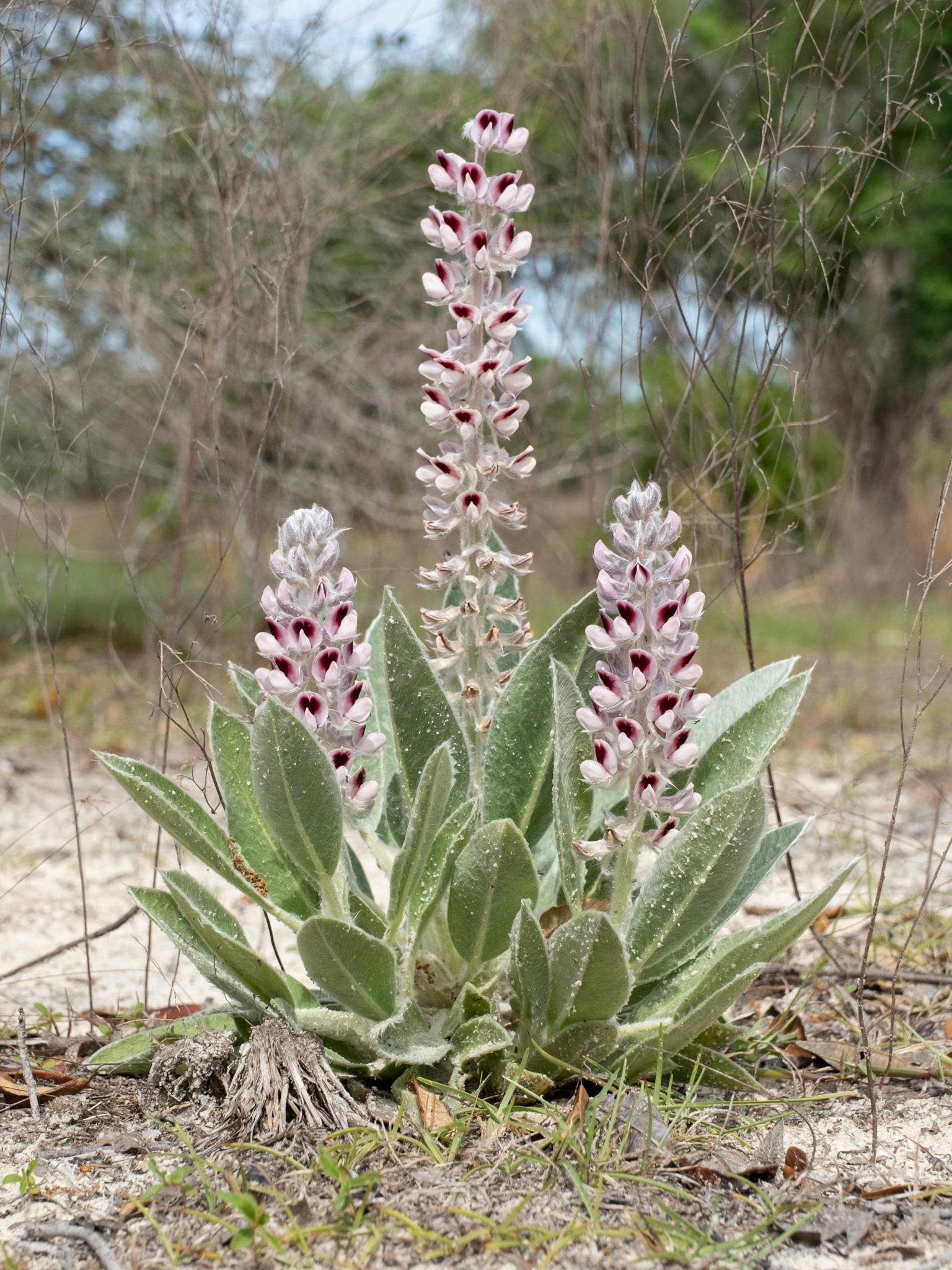

Scientific classification
- Kingdom: Plantae
- Clade: Tracheophytes
- Clade: Angiosperms
- Clade: Eudicots
- Clade: Rosids
- Order: Fabales
- Family: Fabaceae
- Subfamily: Faboideae
- Genus: Lupinus
- Species: L. villosus

Binomial name
- Lupinus villosus Willd.

= Lupinus villosus =

Species of legume

Lupinus villosus, commonly known as lady lupine, pink sandhill lupine, or hairy lupine, is a flowering plant species in the genus Lupinus. in the sweet pea subfamily (Papillionoideae) of the legume family.

== Description ==
The species has pink flowers and a deep taproot that makes it difficult to grow commercially. It is a perennial dicot and attracts butterflies and hummingbirds. The leaves are densely covered with silver hairs.

== Distribution and habitat ==
It grows in parts of Florida and the Southeastern United States in well drained sandy habitats.
