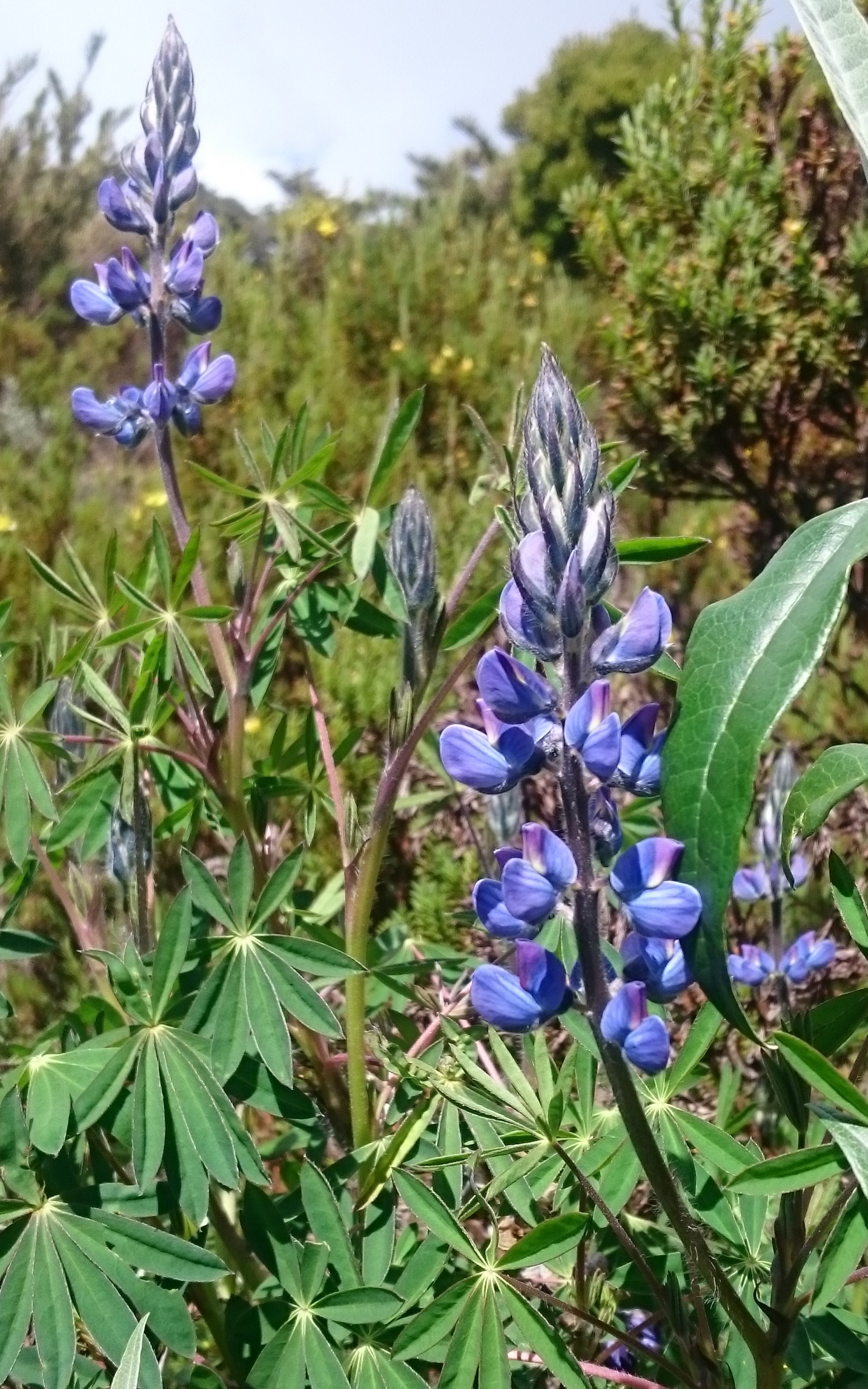

Scientific classification
- Kingdom: Plantae
- Clade: Tracheophytes
- Clade: Angiosperms
- Clade: Eudicots
- Clade: Rosids
- Order: Fabales
- Family: Fabaceae
- Subfamily: Faboideae
- Genus: Lupinus
- Species: L. costaricensis

Binomial name
- Lupinus costaricensis D.B.Dunn 1980 publ. 1981

= Lupinus costaricensis =

Species of plant

Lupinus costaricensis is a species of Lupinus found in Costa Rica and Panama.
