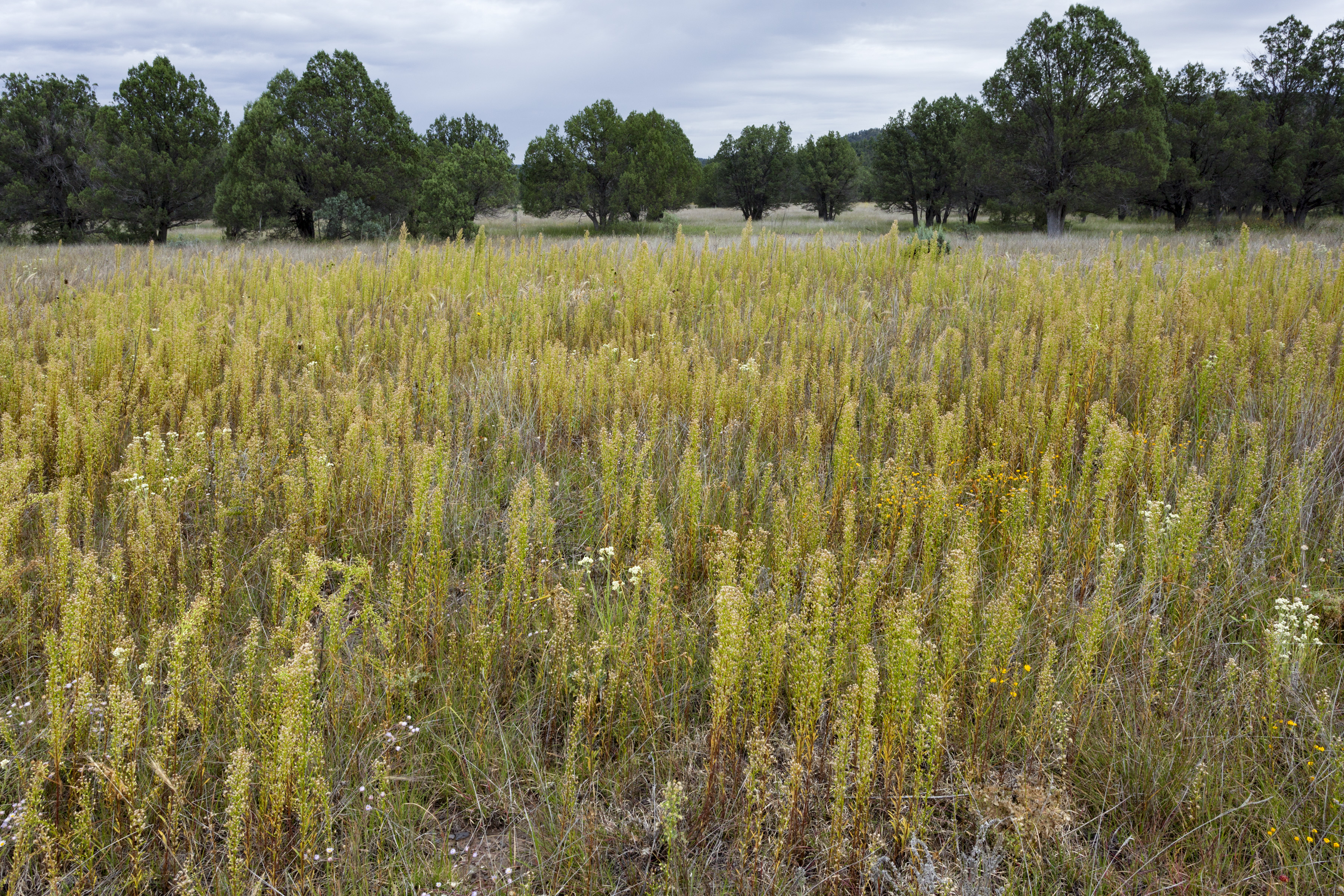

Scientific classification
- Kingdom: Plantae
- Clade: Tracheophytes
- Clade: Angiosperms
- Clade: Eudicots
- Clade: Rosids
- Order: Fabales
- Family: Fabaceae
- Subfamily: Faboideae
- Genus: Lupinus
- Species: L. hillii

Binomial name
- Lupinus hillii Greene

= Lupinus hillii =

Hill's lupine

Species of plant

Lupinus hillii, commonly known as Hill's lupine, is a species of lupine native to Arizona and some parts of New Mexico.

== Subspecies ==
Lupinus hillii has three subspecies, including:

Lupinus hillii var. arizonicus, native to Arizona and New Mexico.

Lupinus hillii var. hillii, native to New Mexico.

Lupinus hillii var. osterhoutianus, native to Arizona and New Mexico.

== Description ==
Hill's lupine can grow up to 2 feet. It grows either upright or horizontally. There is no hair on the stems, but the leaflets are hairy. The green leaves are palmately compound leaves, with 5 to 9 leaflets. The flowers are a variety of colors, including blue, violet, lavender, and purple. The fruit produced is a legume pod. The fruit color starts at green and turns to brown.

== Distribution and habitat ==
Its flowering season is May–September. The elevation that you could find the plant is between 6,000 and 9,000 feet, in Ponderosa pine forests.

Lupinus hillii has a global status of G3, which means it is vulnerable, it also has a local status of S3 in New Mexico.
