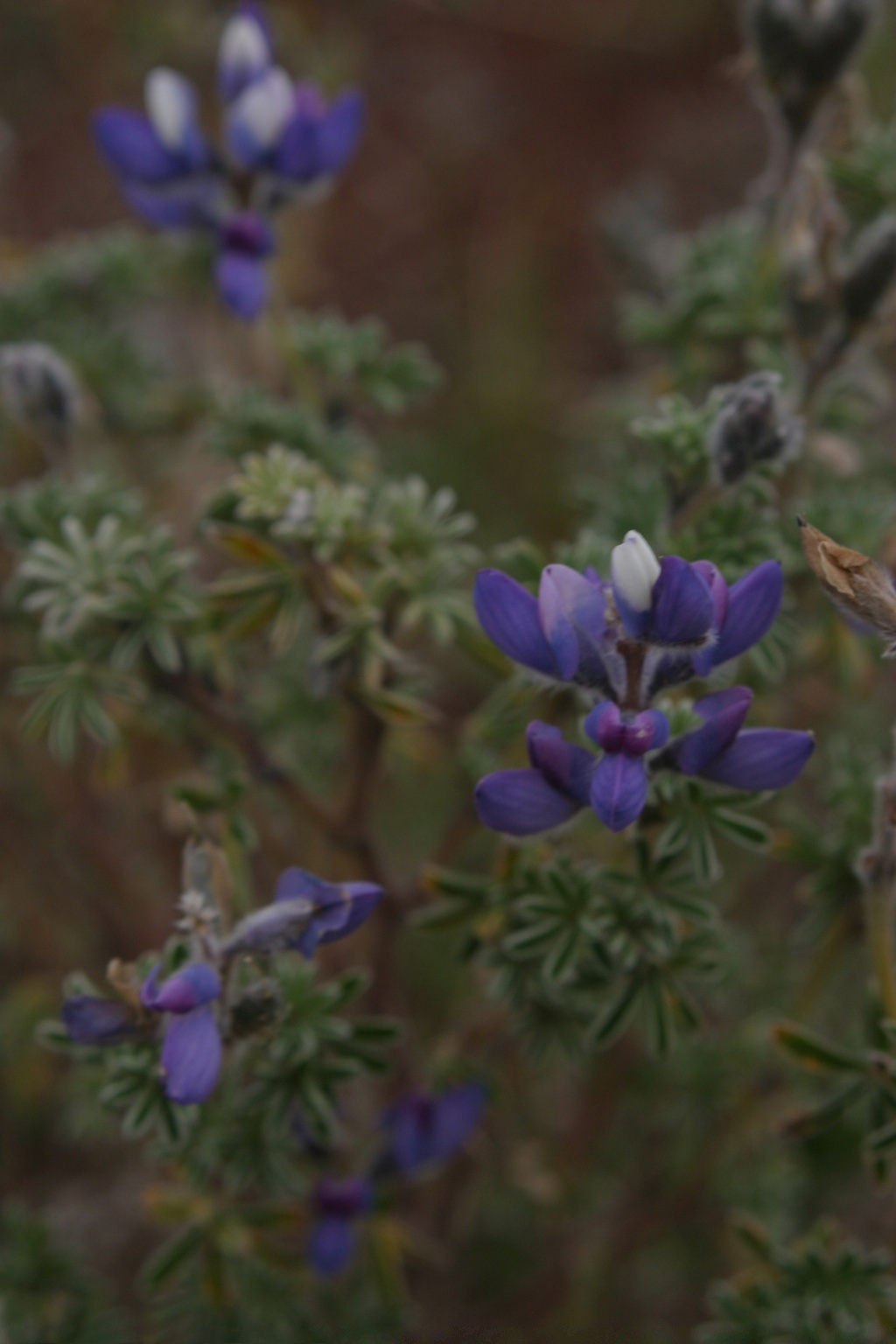
- Lupinus pubescens on Cotopaxi, Ecuador

Conservation status
- Least Concern (IUCN 3.1)

Scientific classification
- Kingdom: Plantae
- Clade: Tracheophytes
- Clade: Angiosperms
- Clade: Eudicots
- Clade: Rosids
- Order: Fabales
- Family: Fabaceae
- Subfamily: Faboideae
- Genus: Lupinus
- Species: L. pubescens

Binomial name
- Lupinus pubescens (Benth.)

= Lupinus pubescens =

Species of legume

Lupinus pubescens (local name: chocho del páramo) is a lupine flower which is native to the high Andes but can also be found in China, Colombia, Ecuador, and Venezuela.
