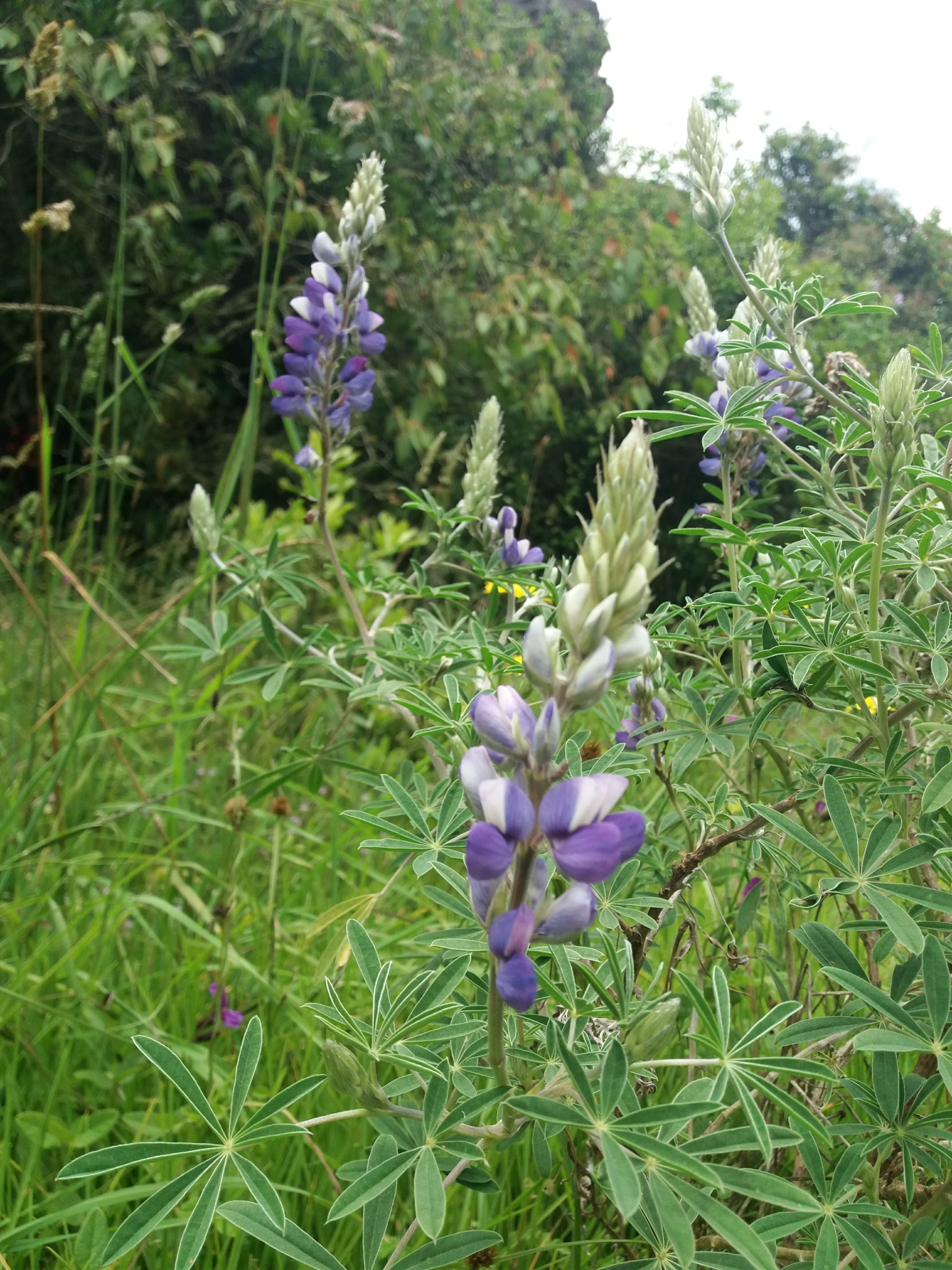

Scientific classification
- Kingdom: Plantae
- Clade: Tracheophytes
- Clade: Angiosperms
- Clade: Eudicots
- Clade: Rosids
- Order: Fabales
- Family: Fabaceae
- Subfamily: Faboideae
- Genus: Lupinus
- Species: L. bogotensis

Binomial name
- Lupinus bogotensis Benth. 1845

Synonyms
- Lupinus bogotensis var. parvior C.P.Sm. 1940

= Lupinus bogotensis =

Species of plant

Lupinus bogotensis is a species of Lupinus found in Bolivia, Colombia, and Ecuador.
