= Lupinus garfieldensis =

Scientific classification
- Kingdom: Plantae
- Clade: Tracheophytes
- Clade: Angiosperms
- Clade: Eudicots
- Clade: Rosids
- Order: Fabales
- Family: Fabaceae
- Subfamily: Faboideae
- Genus: Lupinus
- Species: L. garfieldensis

Binomial name
- Lupinus garfieldensis C.P.Sm.

Synonyms
- Lupinus sericeus var. asotinensis

Species of flowering plant

Lupinus garfieldensis, commonly known as the Garfield lupine or the Asotin Silky lupine, is a species of lupine native to eastern Washington state.

== Distribution and habitat ==
The Garfield lupine is most commonly found in May and June. It can be found in the grassland habitat. The most common elevations for the plant to be found is 610–1,220 m (2,000–4,000 ft).

The Garfield lupine is found along the Snake river, in Garfield, Asotin, and southern Whitman county.

The Garfield lupine has a global species rank of G3Q, which means that the plant is rare but not imperilled and that uncertainty exists about status.

== Description ==
The solid stems are 1–2 m (3 ft 3 in – 6 ft 7 in) long and a little hairy. The compound leaves are alternate and petiole. Leaves palmately 5-11 foliate. The stipules are persistent and adnate to petiole. The bracts are present and small. The flowers are zygomorphic, and the petals are separate, clawed, and orange or yellow. The fruit is a legume, unilocular, freely dehiscent, and exerted from calyx. The seeds are smooth and range in color from olive, to brown, to black.

Even though it could be mistaken for Lupinus sabinianus or Lupinus sericeus, they can be differentiated by their alkaloid profiles.
