= Lupinus hyacinthinus =

Conservation status
- Imperiled (NatureServe)

Scientific classification
- Kingdom: Plantae
- Clade: Tracheophytes
- Clade: Angiosperms
- Clade: Eudicots
- Clade: Rosids
- Order: Fabales
- Family: Fabaceae
- Subfamily: Faboideae
- Genus: Lupinus
- Species: L. hyacinthinus

Binomial name
- Lupinus hyacinthinus Greene

Species of legume

Lupinus hyacinthinus is a species of lupine known by the common name San Jacinto lupine. It is native to the mountains of southern California and adjacent Baja California, where it grows in dry areas, often in pine forests.

== Description ==
It is a perennial herb growing erect to a maximum height of one meter. It is hairy in texture, its newer herbage gray-green in color. Each palmate leaf is divided into up to 12 narrow leaflets up to 8 centimeters long and a few millimeters wide. The inflorescence bears whorls of flowers each over one centimeter long. The flower is purple or blue with a white to yellow patch on its banner. The fruit is a silky-haired legume pod 3 or 4 centimeters long containing speckled seeds. The bloom period is in the months of June, July, and August. The elevation is between 3115 and 9645 feet or 950 and 2940 meters. The growing season is between 1 and 5 months. The wet season is between 4 and 7 months. It is a host for species of butterflies, bees, and hummingbirds, including the Arrowhead Blue butterfly. The bloom colors can be white, yellow, blue, and purple.
