= Bush lupin =

Bush lupin or bush lupine is a common name applied to a number of shrubby species of lupin:

- Lupinus albifrons Silver bush lupine
- Lupinus arboreus Yellow bush lupine
- Lupinus chamissonis Chamisso bush lupine
- Lupinus excubitus Grape soda lupine
- Lupinus longifolius Longleaf bush lupine
