= Canoe Landing Prairie State Natural Area =

State Natural Area in Eau Claire County, Wisconsin

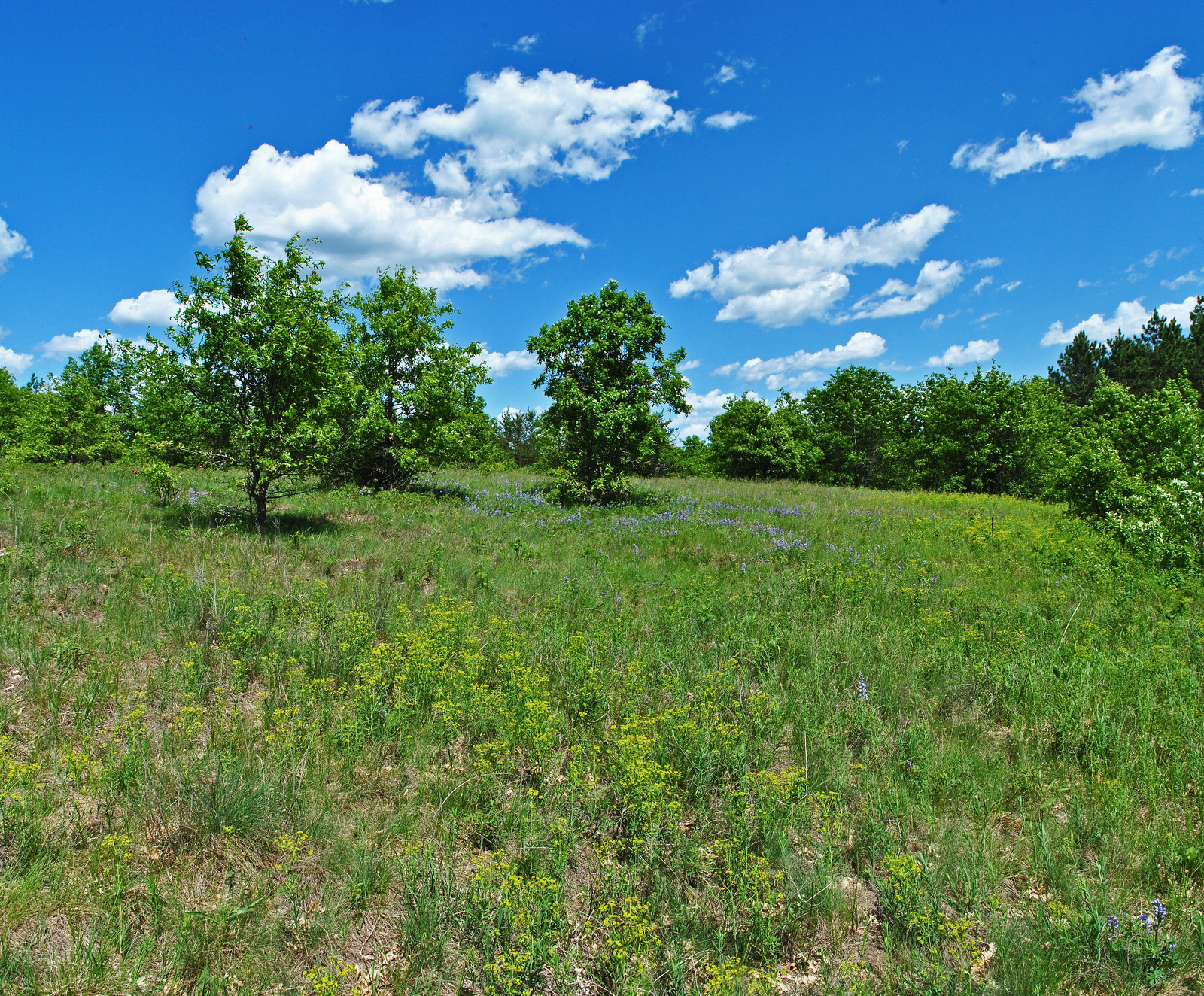

- Location within Wisconsin Location within the United States
- Location: Eau Claire County, Wisconsin
- Coordinates: 44°43′59″N 90°59′8″W
- Area: 44 acres (18 ha)
- Established: 2006
- Owner: Eau Claire County
- Website: Official website
- Wisconsin State Natural Areas

Canoe Landing Prairie is a Wisconsin Department of Natural Resources-designated State Natural Area featuring a diverse Hill's oak barrens and prairie community growing on the gently rolling, sandy uplands near the Eau Claire River. Plant composition includes the following species: Big bluestem, side-oats grama, butterfly weed, blue toadflax, and birdsfoot violet. Wild lupine is also found in the prairie, and supports a population of the karner blue butterfly, an endangered species whose caterpillars feed solely on wild lupine.

== Location and access ==
Canoe Landing Prairie is located within the Eau Claire County Forest, in eastern Eau Claire County, approximately 7.5 miles (12.1 km) northeast of Augusta. Access is via Canoe Landing Forest Road, which bisects the area from north-east to south-west.

== Gallery ==
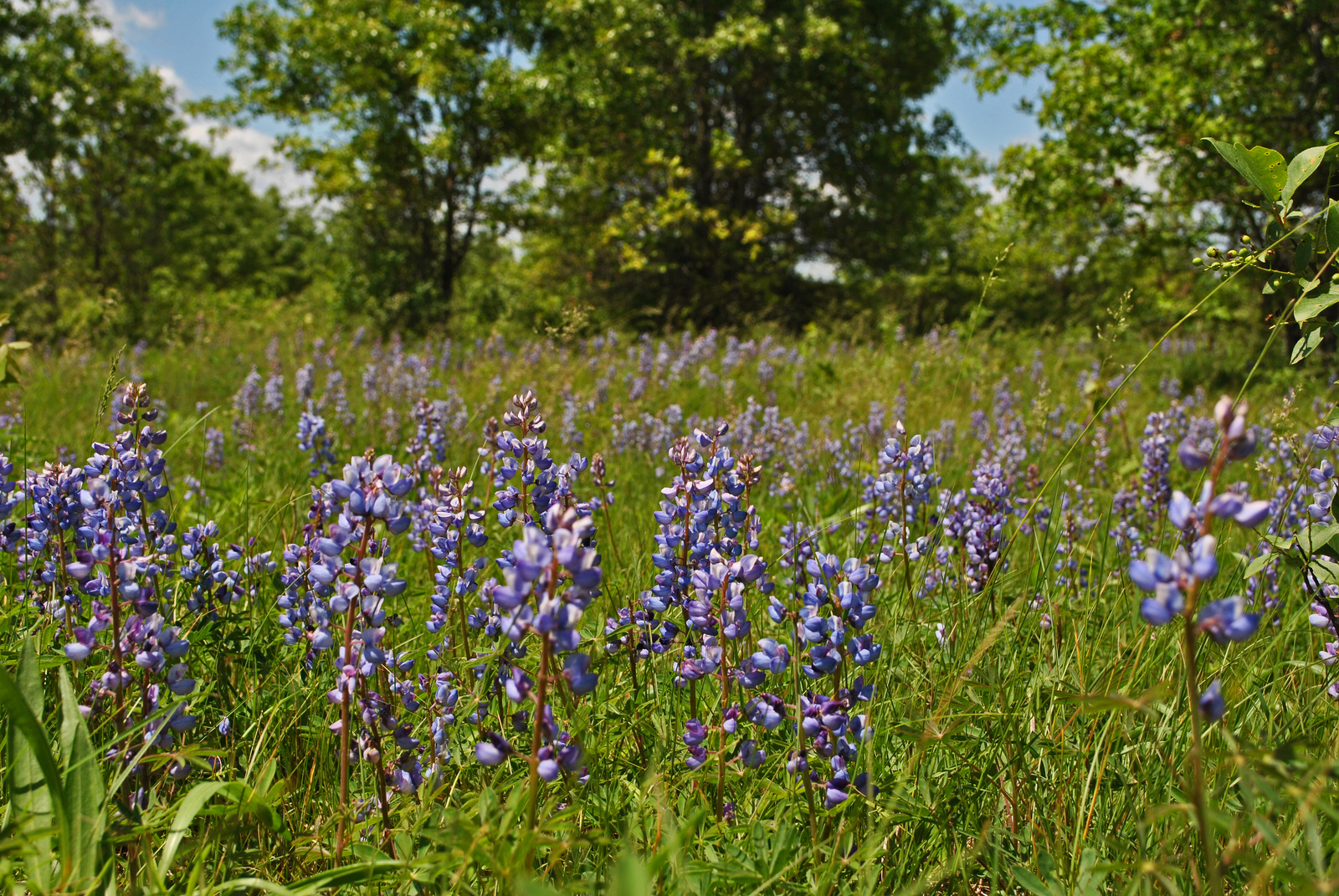
Wild lupine photographed at Canoe Landing Prairie

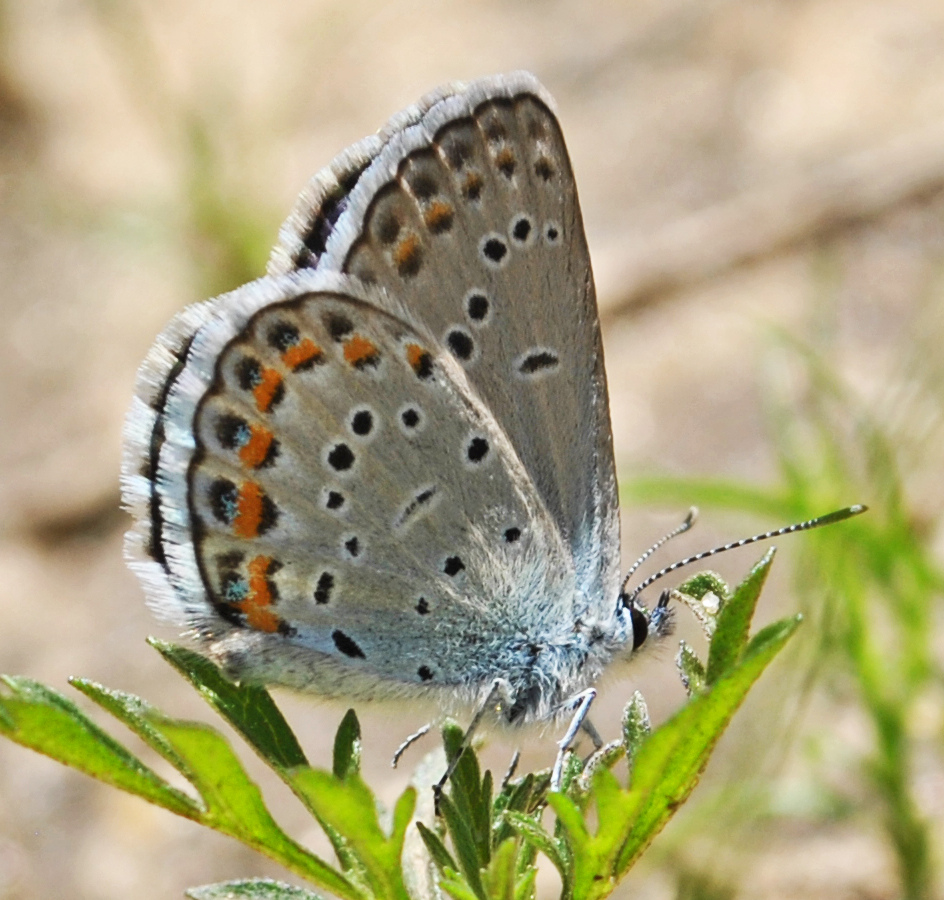
The endangered Karner blue, photographed at Canoe Landing Prairie
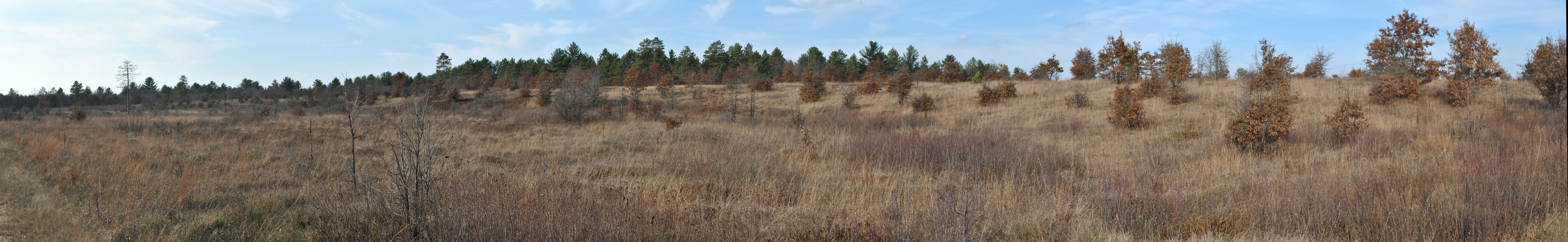
Late autumn panorama
