= Quaker bonnets =

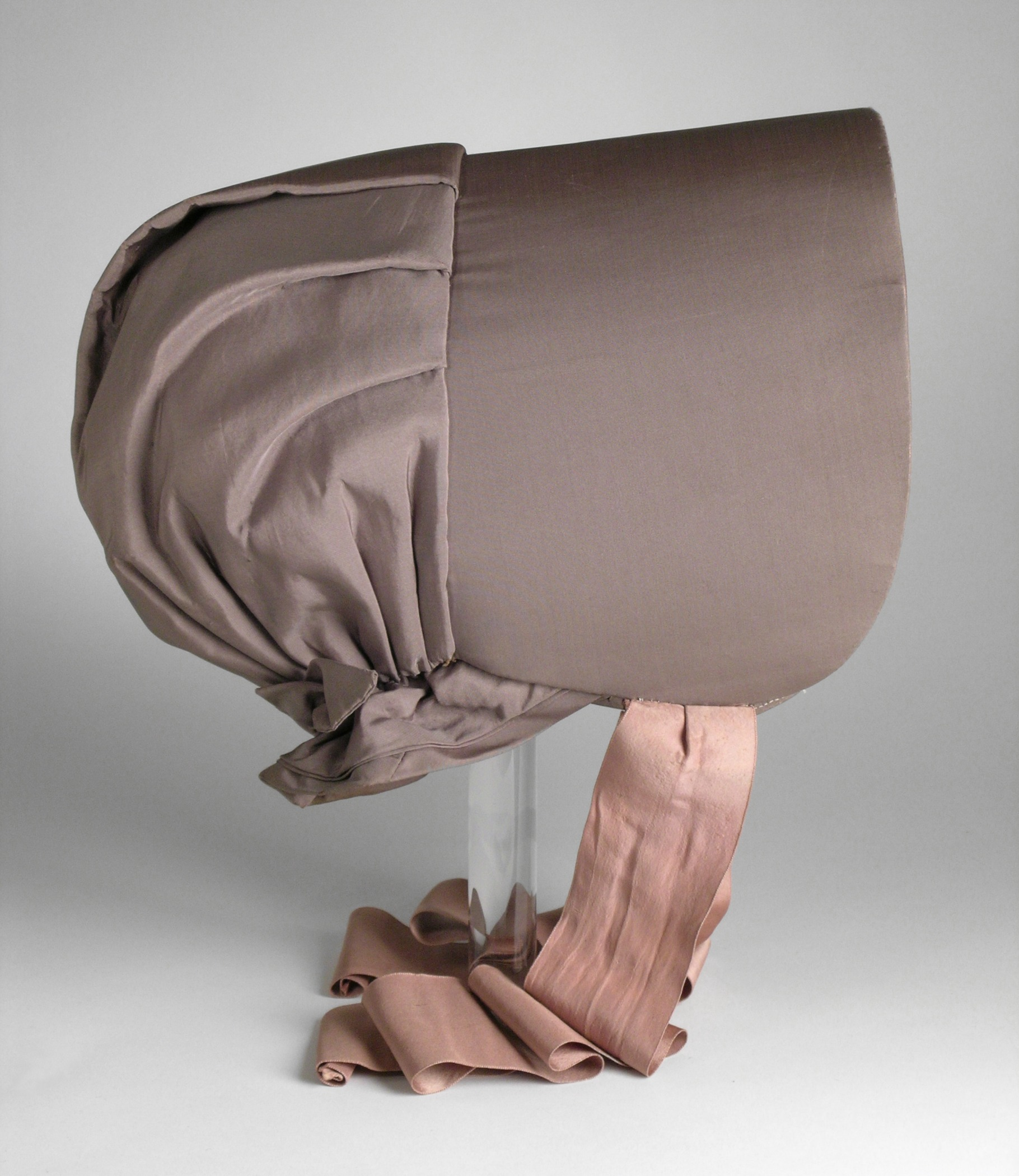
Woman's Quaker bonnet, 1860

Quaker bonnets may refer to historic headwear worn by Quaker women, or:

- Lupinus perennis
- Lupinus polyphyllus
