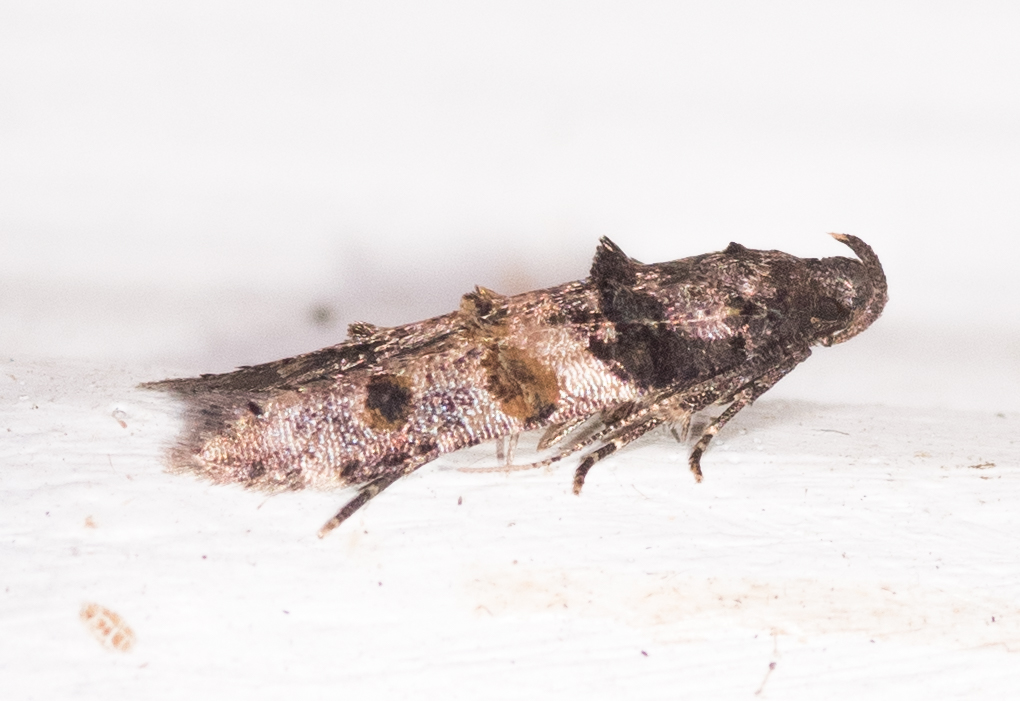

Scientific classification
- Kingdom: Animalia
- Phylum: Arthropoda
- Clade: Pancrustacea
- Class: Insecta
- Order: Lepidoptera
- Family: Cosmopterigidae
- Genus: Walshia
- Species: W. miscecolorella

Binomial name
- Walshia miscecolorella (Chambers, 1875)

Synonyms
- Laverna miscecolorella Chambers, 1875; Laverna miscecalonella

= Walshia miscecolorella =

Species of moth

Walshia miscecolorella, the sweetclover root borer moth, is a moth in the family Cosmopterigidae. It was described by Vactor Tousey Chambers in 1875. It is found in North America, where it has been recorded from southern Canada south to Florida and Texas.

The wingspan is about 9.4-18.6 mm. Adults have been recorded on wing year round.

The larvae feed on Lupinus arboreus, Lupinus chamissonis, Astragalus, Arachis, Melilotus and Cirsium vulgare.
