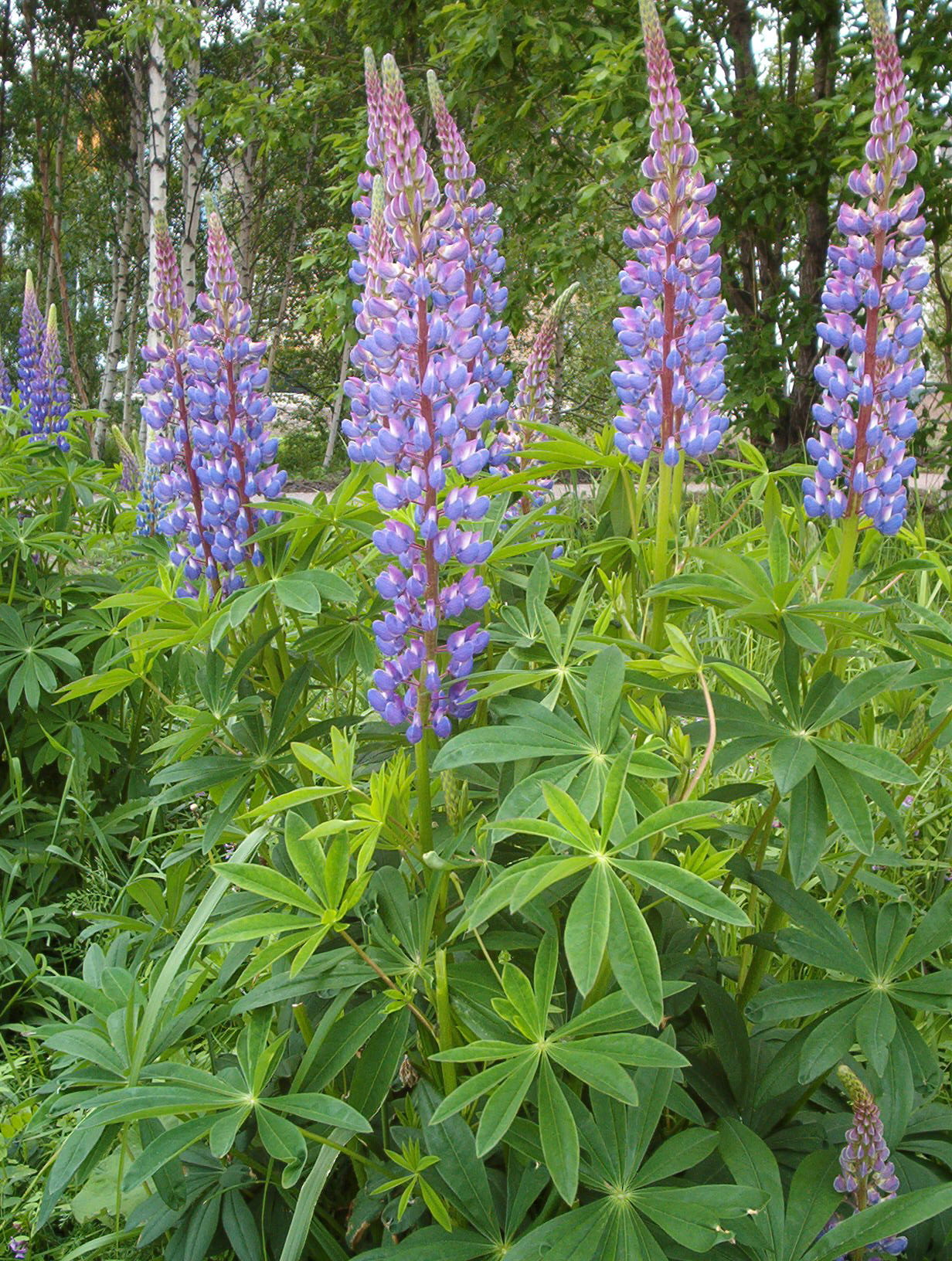

Conservation status
- Least Concern (IUCN 3.1)

Scientific classification
- Kingdom: Plantae
- Clade: Tracheophytes
- Clade: Angiosperms
- Clade: Eudicots
- Clade: Rosids
- Order: Fabales
- Family: Fabaceae
- Subfamily: Faboideae
- Genus: Lupinus
- Subgenus: Lupinus subg. Platycarpos
- Species: L. polyphyllus

Binomial name
- Lupinus polyphyllus Lindl.

= Lupinus polyphyllus =

Species of legume

Lupinus polyphyllus, the large-leaved lupine, big-leaved lupine, many-leaved lupine, blue-pod lupine, or, primarily in cultivation, garden lupin, is a species of lupine (lupin) native to western North America from southern Alaska and British Columbia and western Wyoming, and south to Utah and California. It commonly grows along streams and creeks, preferring moist habitats.

== Description ==
It is a perennial herbaceous plant with stout stems growing to 1.5 metres (4.9 ft) tall. The leaves are palmately compound with 9–17 leaflets 3–15 centimetres (1.2–5.9 in) long. The flowers are produced on a tall spike, each flower 1–1.5 centimetres (0.39–0.59 in) long, most commonly blue to purple in wild plants. The flowers are mostly visited by bumblebees. The polyphyllus variety in particular make up a great number of the hybrids which are generally grown as garden lupines, which can vary dramatically in colours. The majority of lupines do not thrive in rich heavy soils, and often only live for a matter of years if grown in such places, because crown contact with manure or rich organic matter encourages rotting.

== Ecology ==
This lupine may represent a significant threat to the survival of the endangered Karner blue butterfly, due to its ease of hybridization with the Karner's food plant, Lupinus perennis, the wild perennial lupine. Some sources argue that commercial lupine seeds are already questionable for the Karner due to hybridization. Additionally, incompatible lupines continue to be introduced by humans into places where the Karner lives or once lived.

== Taxonomy ==
There are five varieties:

- Lupinus polyphyllus var. burkei – Interior northwestern United States
- Lupinus polyphyllus var. humicola – Interior western North America
- Lupinus polyphyllus var. pallidipes – Western Oregon and Washington (Willamette Valley)
- Lupinus polyphyllus var. polyphyllus – Coastal western North America
- Lupinus polyphyllus var. prunophilus – Interior western North America

The species epithet polyphyllus means "many-leaved", from Ancient Greek πολύς (polús) "many" and φύλλον (phúllon) "leaf".

Close-up of a Russell hybrid lupine in a typical garden setting in England

=== Hybrids ===
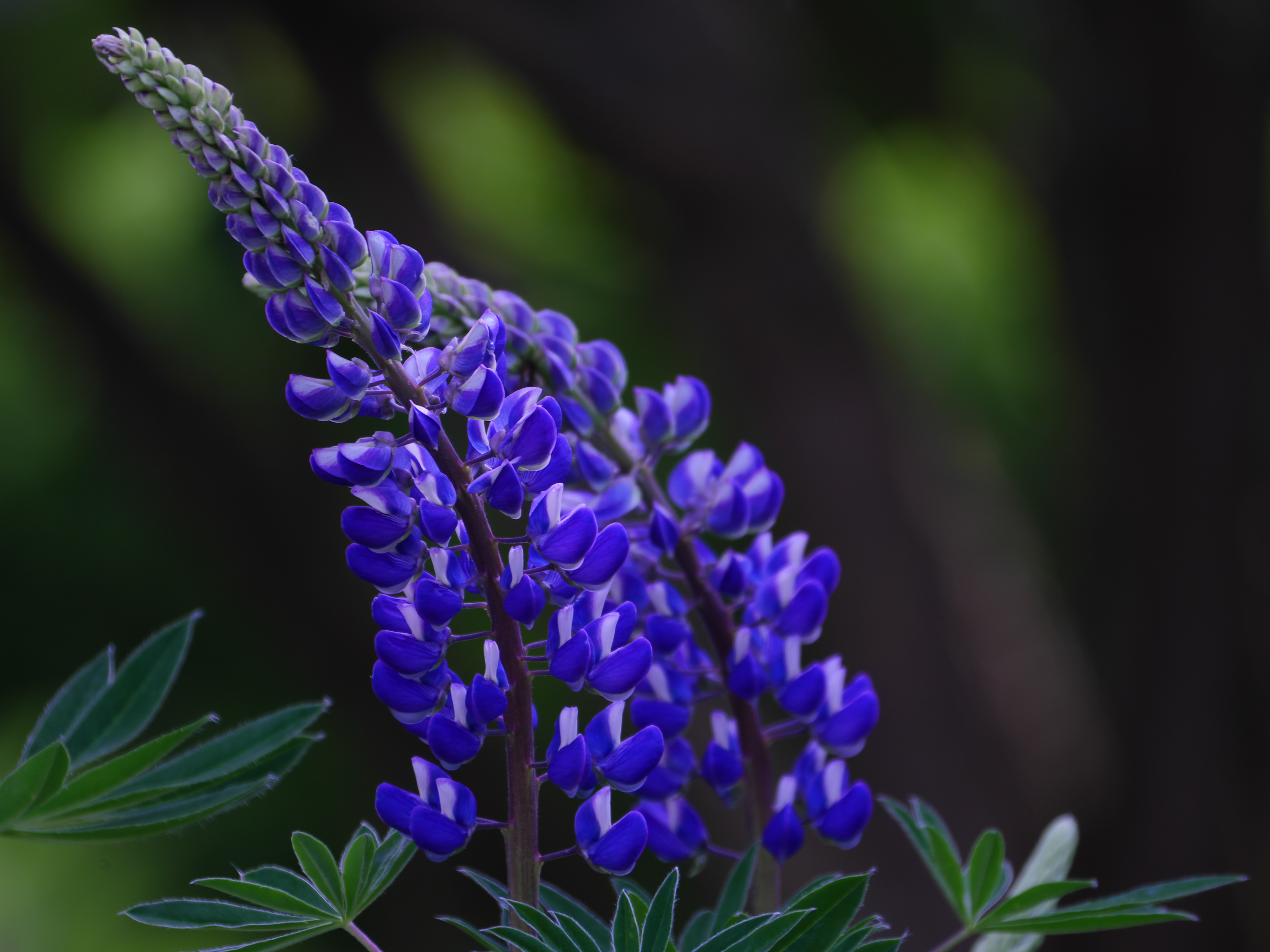
Close up of Lupinus polyphyllus flower

The herbaceous lupin Lupinus polyphyllus was brought by David Douglas from North America to Britain in the 1820s. Almost a century later, George Russell, a horticulturist from York, UK, started to breed the (later famous) Russell hybrids (Lupinus × russellii hort). Lupinus polphyllus were originally of basic colours and had large gaps in the flowering spike. Without the use of modern-day plant breeding techniques, Russell took to ruthlessly pulling out any plants which he deemed to be unacceptable in growth or display. He spent two decades single-handedly trying to breed the perfect lupin, crossing L. polyphyllus with L. arboreus, L. sulphureus and one or more annual species (maybe L. nootkatensis).

Over the decades, the plants he selected developed flower spikes that were denser, larger, and more colourful than the original Lupinus polyphyllus. His work may have gone unrecognised if he had not been encouraged by nurseryman James Baker to show the plants to the public. It is understood the pair worked together for several years to perfect the Russell Hybrid, before they were displayed at the Royal Horticultural Society's June show in 1937, where their brightly coloured, tightly packed spires won awards. Russell was later awarded an MBE, and the Royal Horticultural Society awarded him the Veitch Memorial Medal for a lifetime's achievement in horticulture. Baker later secured Russell's entire stock; in their heyday, Bakers Nurseries Ltd. of Codsall, Wolverhampton attracted 80,000 visitors in June to see 40 acres (16 ha) of lupines in flower.

Russell disliked the blue colours, as they reflected too closely the original plants imported from America almost a 100 years previously. The blue colouring is a recessive allele, and so although Russell might have worked hard to suppress it, lupines left unchecked over several generations will eventually revert to the old blues. Almost all garden lupines today are hybrids of the true Russell hybrids due to their ease of cross pollinating with one another, and with no special interest in lupine cultivating until recent years it has meant the plants have created a large pool of genetic diversity and variation from the original Russells.

There is strong concern that Russell lupine DNA significantly contaminates large percentages of commercially available wild perennial Lupine, Lupinus perennis, seed, making it potentially unsuitable for the larvae of the endangered Karner Blue, Plebejus melissa samuelis, butterfly. The Karner cannot feed upon Russell lupines, nor can it feed upon the base Lupinus polyphyllus species. Those who wish to protect the Karner should prevent the introduction of Lupinus polyphyllus and Russell lupines into the remaining areas where the butterfly continues to exist, to prevent the toxic lupine hybridization.

The templates created by Russell are still used by other specialist lupine horticulturalists today, e.g., Maurice and Brian Woodfield, nurserymen from Stratford-upon-Avon, who received the RHS Veitch Memorial Medal for their work on lupines in 2000. The Woodfields created more complex plants with more varied and vivid bi-coloured spikes, the red and yellow, and red and purple flowers are particular highlights of the "Woodfield" lupine variety. In 2009, Sarah Conibear who runs the Westcountry Nurseries, displayed several new varieties including the 'Beefeater', about which the RHS writer Graham Rice commented "[the beefeater] has what looks to be the best red lupine we've seen so far."

== Cultivation and uses ==
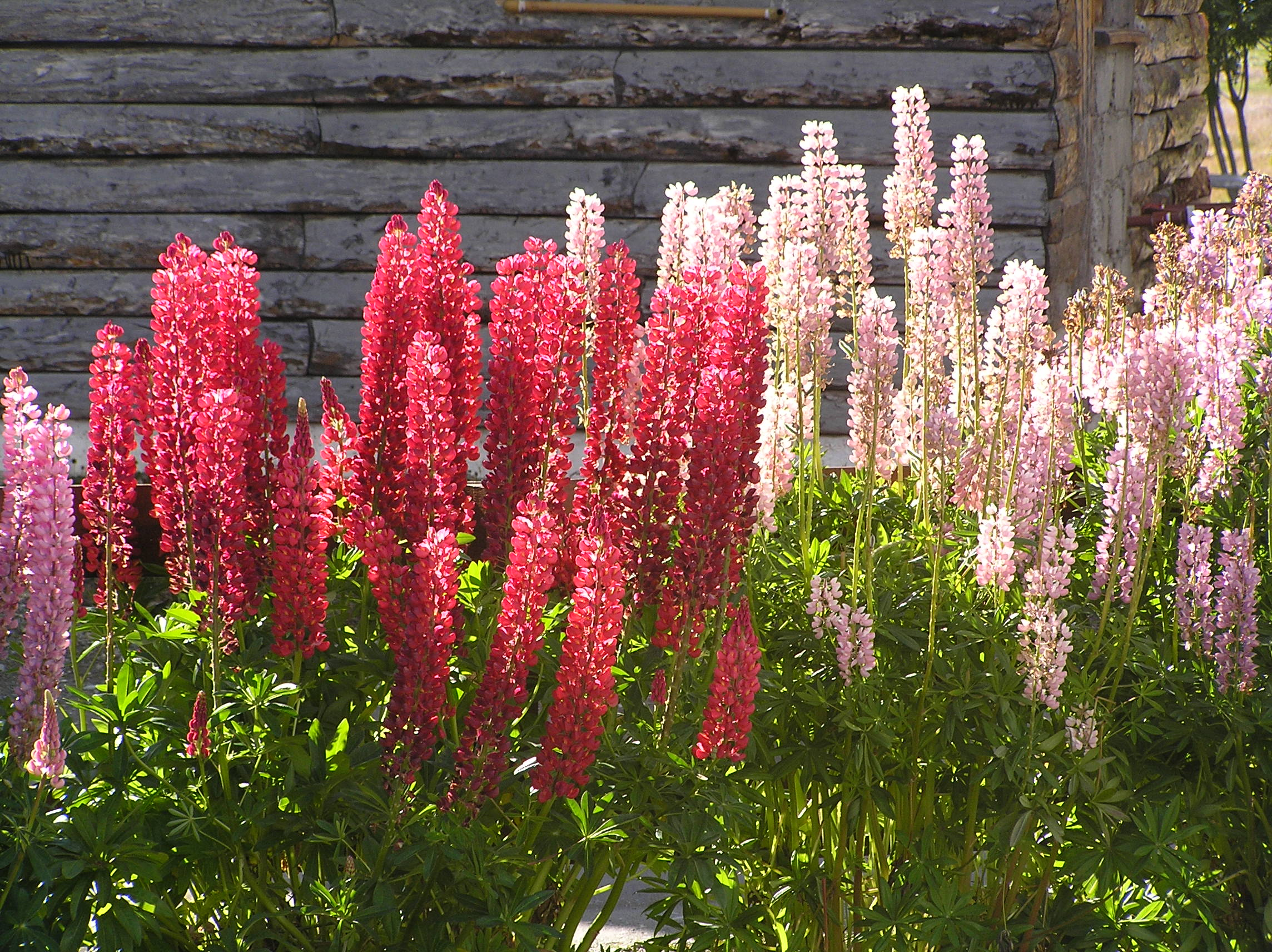
Garden cultivars of Lupinus polyphyllus

It is commonly used in gardens for its attractiveness to bees, as well as its ability to improve poor sandy soils with its nitrogen fixing ability and flowers. Numerous cultivars have been selected for differing flower colour, including red, pink, white, blue, and multicoloured with different colours on different petals. Often hybrids between L. polyphyllus and L. arboreus are used, and sold under hybrid names such as Rainbow Lupins, Lupin Tutti Fruitti, and Band of Nobles (mixed), Chandelier (yellow), My Castle (red), Noble Maiden (white), The Chatelaine (pink), and The Governor (blue). They are very hardy plants, surviving extreme temperatures and withstanding frost to at least −25 °C (−13 °F). The wild varieties can easily become invasive and hard to dispose of unless kept in check on a regular basis. Growing lupins in pots can help prevent them from growing invasively in the ground. They need a reasonable level of sun to survive, and do best in light soils, suffering in heavy and clay types. Once fully established they are extremely resilient and may be divided. Seeds taken from the mother plant will never be a true replica of the original even if they produce similar colourings.

Low alkaloidal or sweet cultivars of this lupine suitable for fodder crops have been bred. To avoid restoration of alkaloid synthesis in cross-pollinated species of lupine, a new approach has been developed on the basis of specific crossing. Only compatible forms are involved in hybridization, with their low alkaloid content controlled by one and the same genetic system. These approaches have allowed transforming this bitter weed into a valuable fodder crop. In the conditions of Northwest Russia positive results from the use of the sweet commercial cultivar "Pervenec" (first sweet variety), which is included in the State Catalogue of selection achievements of Russia. Breeding of sweet lupine is carried out also in Finland. The newer garden hybrids of today are highly poisonous because they are full of toxic alkaloids and should never be eaten.

The species is also toxic to livestock.

The Sylix/Okanagan use blue lupine blooming as a sign that it is time to hunt marmots.

== Invasive species ==
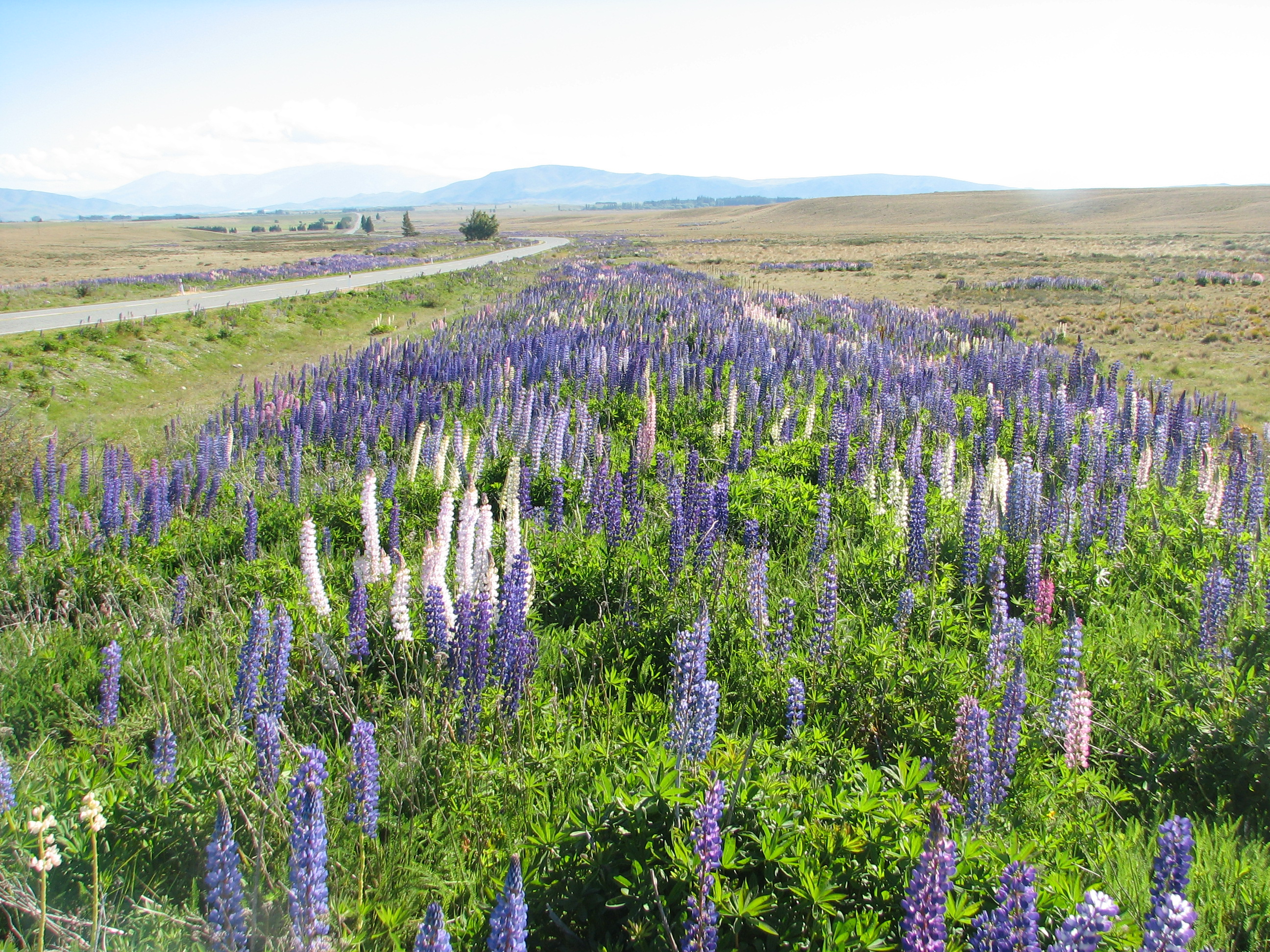
Russell lupines alongside a road in Canterbury, New Zealand.

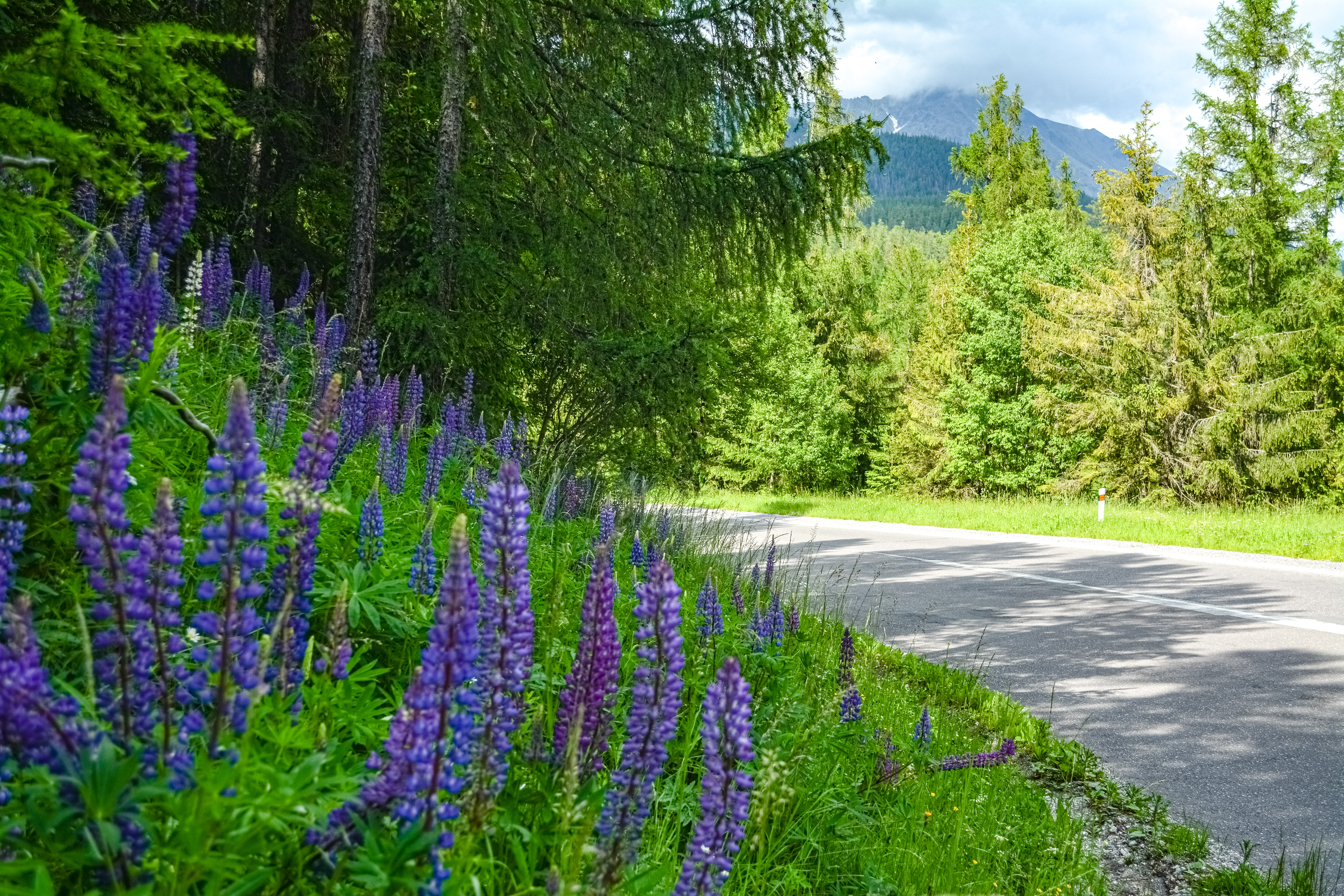
Lupinus polyphyllus alongside a road in High Tatras, Slovakia.

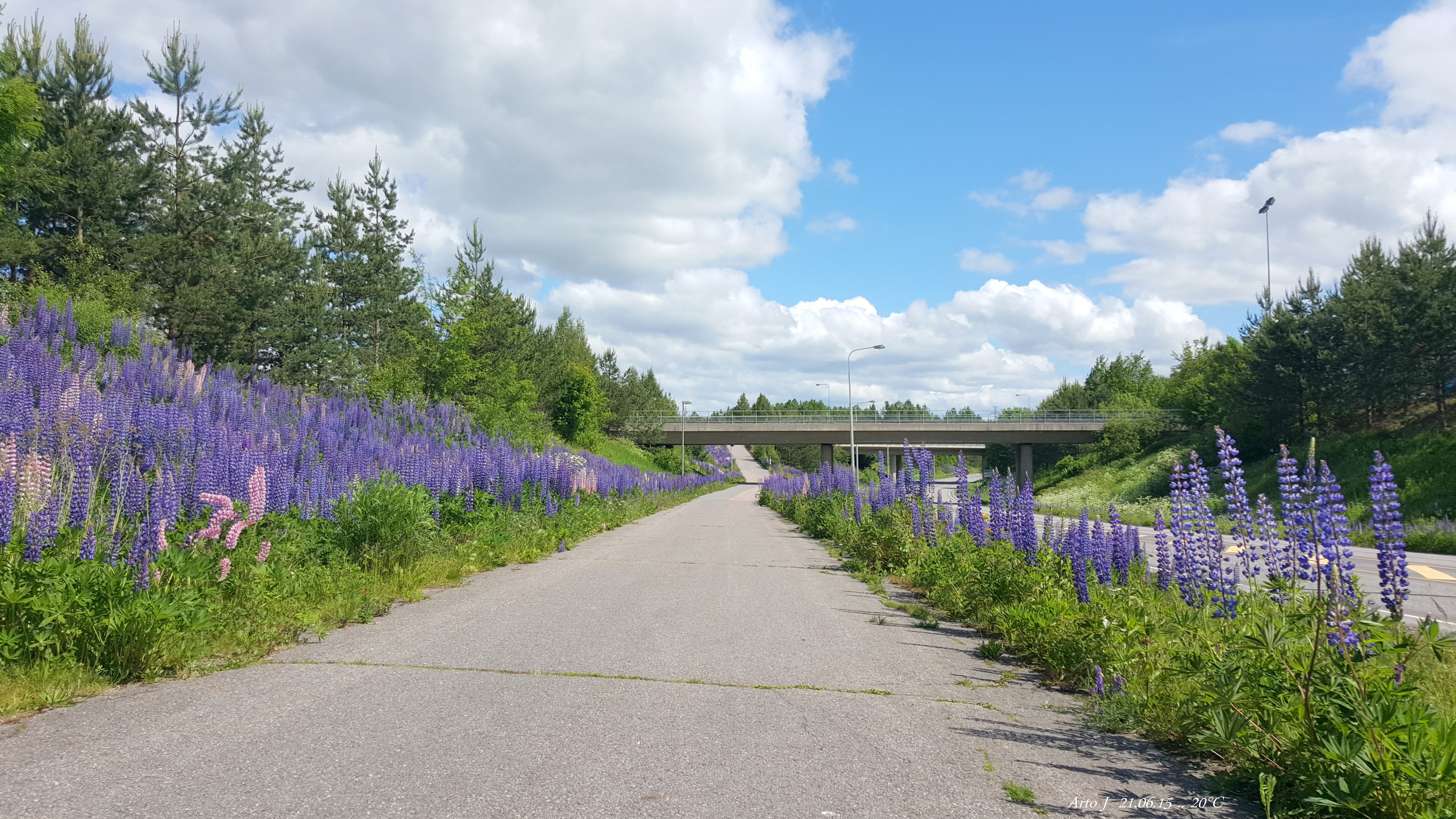
Wild Lupins alongside a road in Finland

In New Zealand, where it is known as the Russell lupin, Lupinus polyphyllus is classed as an invasive species and covers large areas next to roadsides, pastures and riverbeds, especially in the Canterbury region. It is documented as being first naturalised in 1958 and it has been suggested that tour bus drivers deliberately spread seeds of the plant to promote colourful roadside vegetation in areas which some tourists may consider to be rather drab. The plant threatens indigenous species especially when it invades the braided river beds in the South Island.

It is also classed as an invasive species in Sweden, Norway, Switzerland, Argentina, the Czech Republic, Finland, Lithuania, and Ukraine.
