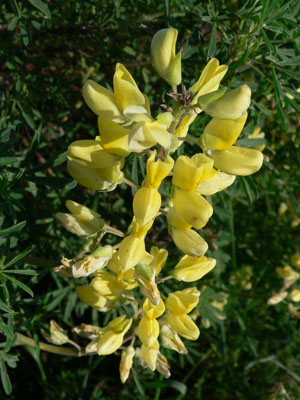

Scientific classification
- Kingdom: Plantae
- Clade: Embryophytes
- Clade: Tracheophytes
- Clade: Angiosperms
- Clade: Eudicots
- Clade: Rosids
- Order: Fabales
- Family: Fabaceae
- Subfamily: Faboideae
- Genus: Lupinus
- Subgenus: Lupinus subg. Platycarpos
- Species: L. arboreus

Binomial name
- Lupinus arboreus Sims

= Lupinus arboreus =

Species of plant

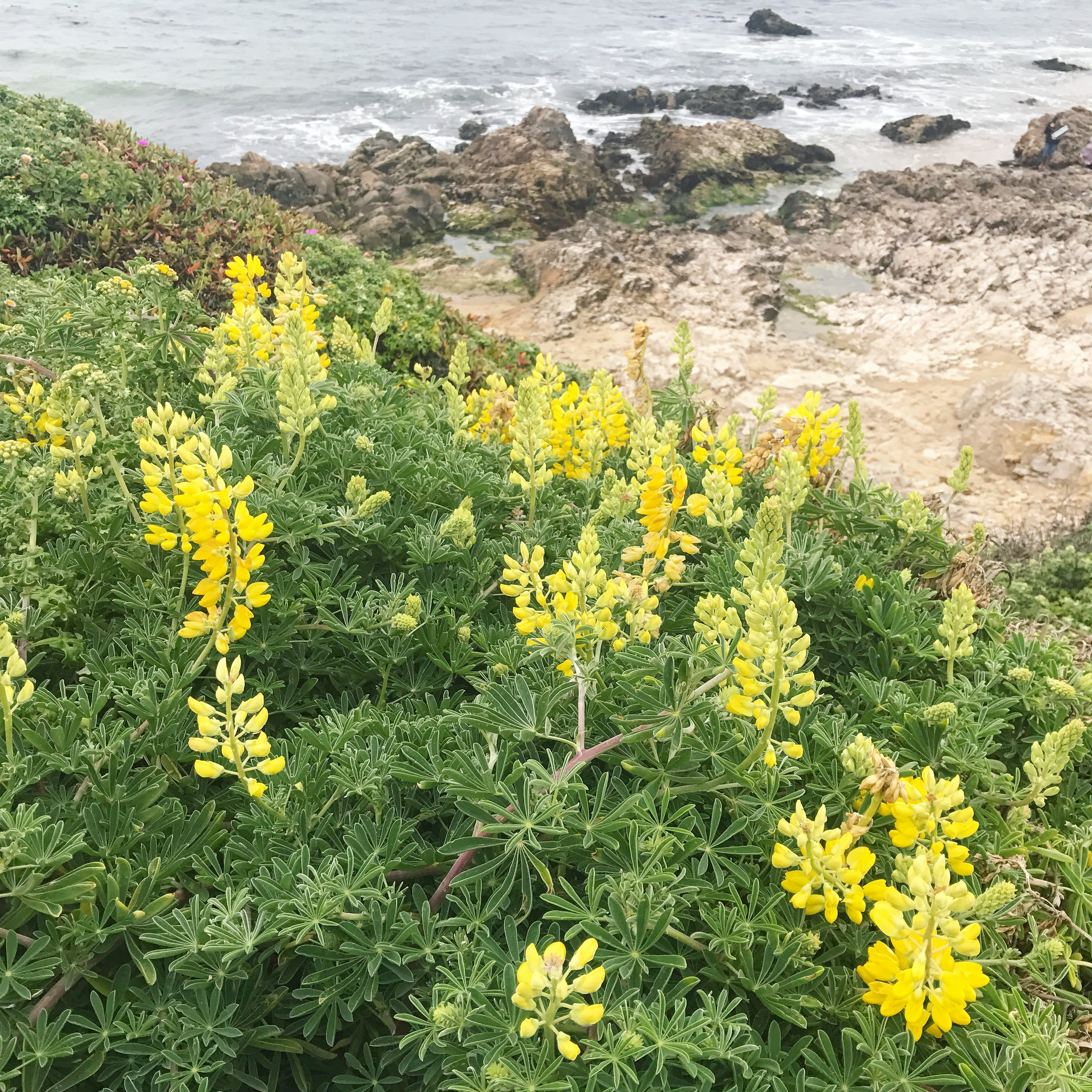
Growing at Pescadero State Beach

Lupinus arboreus, the yellow bush lupine, coastal bush lupine (US) or tree lupin (UK), is a species of flowering plant in the legume family Fabaceae.

== Description ==
Lupinus arboreus is an evergreen shrub growing to 2 m (7 ft) tall (hence the alternative common name, tree lupine) in sheltered situations, but more typically 1–1.5 m (3–5 ft) tall. It is capable of tolerating temperatures down to −12 °C and living for up to seven years.

It has green to gray-green palmate leaves, with 5–12 leaflets per leaf. The leaflets are 2–6 centimetres (0.79–2.36 in) long, often sparsely covered with fine silky hairs.

In spring it bears many racemes, 30 cm (12 in) long, of fragrant, soft yellow, pea-like flowers. Both yellow and lilac to purple flowering forms are known. However, the yellow form is more common, except in the north of the species' range.

== Distribution ==
The shrub is indigenous to California, US, where it is widely distributed among coastal sage scrub and sand dunes. Because it has been widely introduced in the state, there is some uncertainty about its native range. It is thought to be native from Point Reyes National Seashore south to San Luis Obispo County.

== Invasive species ==
It has escaped from cultivation to become an invasive species in many areas. Outside of its native range in central and northern coastal California, it can become invasive southwards in Southern California and Baja California, and northwards in the coastal Pacific Northwest and British Columbia. It is an introduced species in western Europe, Australia (a potential noxious weed), New Zealand, the Turkish Anatolian Aegean Region, and southern South America including the Falkland Islands.

Like many members of the Fabaceae, it is an effective fixer of nitrogen in the soil. Where it has been introduced, it changes the chemistry of the soil, and therefore allows other exotics to establish themselves, to the detriment of native plants adapted to low nitrogen levels. It also hybridizes with other lupine species outside its range, such as Lupinus littoralis (seashore lupin) and Lupinus rivularis (riverbank lupin), further endangering the survival of those native ecosystem integrated species.

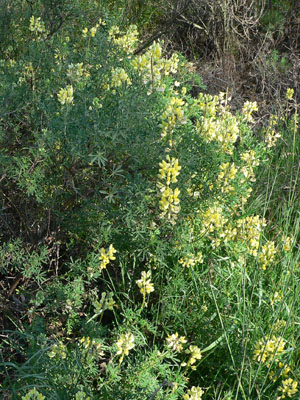

== Cultivation ==
The yellow-flowering form of Lupinus arboreus is widely grown as an ornamental plant, for its attractive flowers in traditional, native plant, and wildlife gardens. It is also used to bind drifting sand dunes. It can be seen growing in cracks in vertical stone walls, due to the sharp drainage. Lupins can also be cultivated on balconies or patios in pots.

It has gained the Royal Horticultural Society's Award of Garden Merit.

== Related shrub species ==
In addition to the numerous annual and perennial lupines, some other Lupine species also naturally grow as shrubs, including:

- Lupinus chamissonis – Chamisso bush lupine, silver bush lupine
- Lupinus albifrons – Bush lupine
- Lupinus excubitus – Grape soda lupine
- Lupinus longifolius – Longleaf bush lupine
