= Walshia particornella =

Scientific classification
- Domain: Eukaryota
- Kingdom: Animalia
- Phylum: Arthropoda
- Class: Insecta
- Order: Lepidoptera
- Family: Cosmopterigidae
- Genus: Walshia
- Species: W. particornella

Binomial name
- Walshia particornella (Busck, 1919)

Synonyms
- Perimede particornella Busck, 1909

Species of moth

Walshia particornella is a moth in the family Cosmopterigidae. It was described by August Busck in 1919. It is found in North America, where it has been recorded from Maryland, Illinois, Arkansas, Kentucky, Mississippi, Texas and Florida.

The wingspan is 13 mm. Adults have been recorded on wing from April to July and in November.
