= Walshia pentapyrga =

Scientific classification
- Kingdom: Animalia
- Phylum: Arthropoda
- Class: Insecta
- Order: Lepidoptera
- Family: Cosmopterigidae
- Genus: Walshia
- Species: W. pentapyrga

Binomial name
- Walshia pentapyrga (Meyrick, 1922)

Synonyms
- Mompha pentapyrga Meyrick, 1922

Species of moth

Walshia pentapyrga is a moth in the family Cosmopterigidae. It was described by Edward Meyrick in 1922. It is found in Brazil (from Para).
