= Walshia dispar =

Scientific classification
- Kingdom: Animalia
- Phylum: Arthropoda
- Clade: Pancrustacea
- Class: Insecta
- Order: Lepidoptera
- Family: Cosmopterigidae
- Genus: Walshia
- Species: W. dispar

Binomial name
- Walshia dispar Hodges, 1961

Species of moth

Walshia dispar is a moth in the family Cosmopterigidae. It was described by Ronald W. Hodges in 1961. It is found in North America, where it has been recorded from Ontario to Virginia.

The wingspan is about 13 mm. Adults have been recorded on wing in July and August.
