= Walshia detracta =

Scientific classification
- Domain: Eukaryota
- Kingdom: Animalia
- Phylum: Arthropoda
- Class: Insecta
- Order: Lepidoptera
- Family: Cosmopterigidae
- Genus: Walshia
- Species: W. detracta

Binomial name
- Walshia detracta Walsingham, 1909

Synonyms
- Mompha detracta

Species of moth

Walshia detracta is a moth in the family Cosmopterigidae. It was described by Lord Walsingham in 1909. It is found in Mexico.
