= Walshia similis =

Scientific classification
- Kingdom: Animalia
- Phylum: Arthropoda
- Clade: Pancrustacea
- Class: Insecta
- Order: Lepidoptera
- Family: Cosmopterigidae
- Genus: Walshia
- Species: W. similis

Binomial name
- Walshia similis Hodges, 1961

Species of moth

Walshia similis is a moth in the family Cosmopterigidae. It was described by Ronald W. Hodges in 1961. It is found in North America, where it has been recorded from Massachusetts, Michigan and from Illinois to South Carolina and Florida.

The wingspan is about 14 mm. Adults have been recorded on wing from June to September and in November.
