= Karner, New York =

- Hamlet
- Location within New York Location within the United States
- Coordinates: 42°43′35″N 73°51′20″W
- Country: United States
- State: New York
- Region: Capital District
- County: Albany
- Town: Colonie
- Settled: 1831
- Time zone: UTC-5 (EST)
  - Summer (DST): UTC-4 (EDT)
- ZIP Code: 12205 (Colonie)
- Area code: 518

Karner is a hamlet of the town of Colonie, Albany County, New York, United States. Once called Center Station, it was a stop along the New York Central Railroad (NYCRR) that became famous for being the site where the Karner Blue butterfly was first identified.

== History ==
Karner started as Center Station along the New York Central Railroad's (NYCRR) tracks. The station was built in 1831. George Karner, in the mid-to-late 19th century, bought the land that would become the hamlet and laid out streets and lots, though most did not sell. Center was renamed Karner in 1880 for him. Though development never made Karner important, the lack of development did save the Plebejus melissa samuelis, or Karner Blue butterfly. The common name of the butterfly is named after the hamlet, because it was here that Vladimir Nabokov first identified the species and used the specimens located in the Albany Pine Bush as the type specimen for the identification of the entire species.

== Geography ==
Karner is centered along Karner Road with the CSXT/Amtrak tracks between Albany and Schenectady passing through the center of the hamlet. Along the western edge of Karner is the New Karner Road, New York Route 155. The edges surrounding the core of the hamlet are rural pine barrens with much of the land protected in the Pine Bush Preserve.
