= Walshia elegans =

Scientific classification
- Kingdom: Animalia
- Phylum: Arthropoda
- Clade: Pancrustacea
- Class: Insecta
- Order: Lepidoptera
- Family: Cosmopterigidae
- Genus: Walshia
- Species: W. elegans

Binomial name
- Walshia elegans Hodges, 1978

Species of moth

Walshia elegans is a moth in the family Cosmopterigidae. It was described by Ronald W. Hodges in 1978. It is found in North America, where it has been recorded from Florida, Louisiana, Arkansas, Iowa and West Virginia.

The wingspan is about 12 mm. Adults are on wing from June to October.
