= Walshia floridensis =

Scientific classification
- Kingdom: Animalia
- Phylum: Arthropoda
- Clade: Pancrustacea
- Class: Insecta
- Order: Lepidoptera
- Family: Cosmopterigidae
- Genus: Walshia
- Species: W. floridensis

Binomial name
- Walshia floridensis Hodges, 1978

Species of moth

Walshia floridensis is a moth in the family Cosmopterigidae. It was described by Ronald W. Hodges in 1978. It is found in North America, where it has been recorded from Florida.

Adults have been recorded on wing from November to January.

The larvae feed on Petalostemon pinnatum.
