= Walshia calcarata =

Scientific classification
- Domain: Eukaryota
- Kingdom: Animalia
- Phylum: Arthropoda
- Class: Insecta
- Order: Lepidoptera
- Family: Cosmopterigidae
- Genus: Walshia
- Species: W. calcarata

Binomial name
- Walshia calcarata Walsingham, 1909

Synonyms
- Mompha calcarata

Species of moth

Walshia calcarata is a moth in the family Cosmopterigidae. It was described by Lord Walsingham in 1909. It is found in Mexico.
