= Walshia exemplata =

Scientific classification
- Kingdom: Animalia
- Phylum: Arthropoda
- Clade: Pancrustacea
- Class: Insecta
- Order: Lepidoptera
- Family: Cosmopterigidae
- Genus: Walshia
- Species: W. exemplata

Binomial name
- Walshia exemplata Hodges, 1961

Species of moth

Walshia exemplata is a moth in the family Cosmopterigidae. It was described by Ronald W. Hodges in 1961. It is found in North America, where it has been recorded from Maryland, Arkansas, Indiana, Ohio, West Virginia, South Carolina, Mississippi, Louisiana and Florida.

The wingspan is about 13 mm. Adults have been recorded on wing from July to September.
