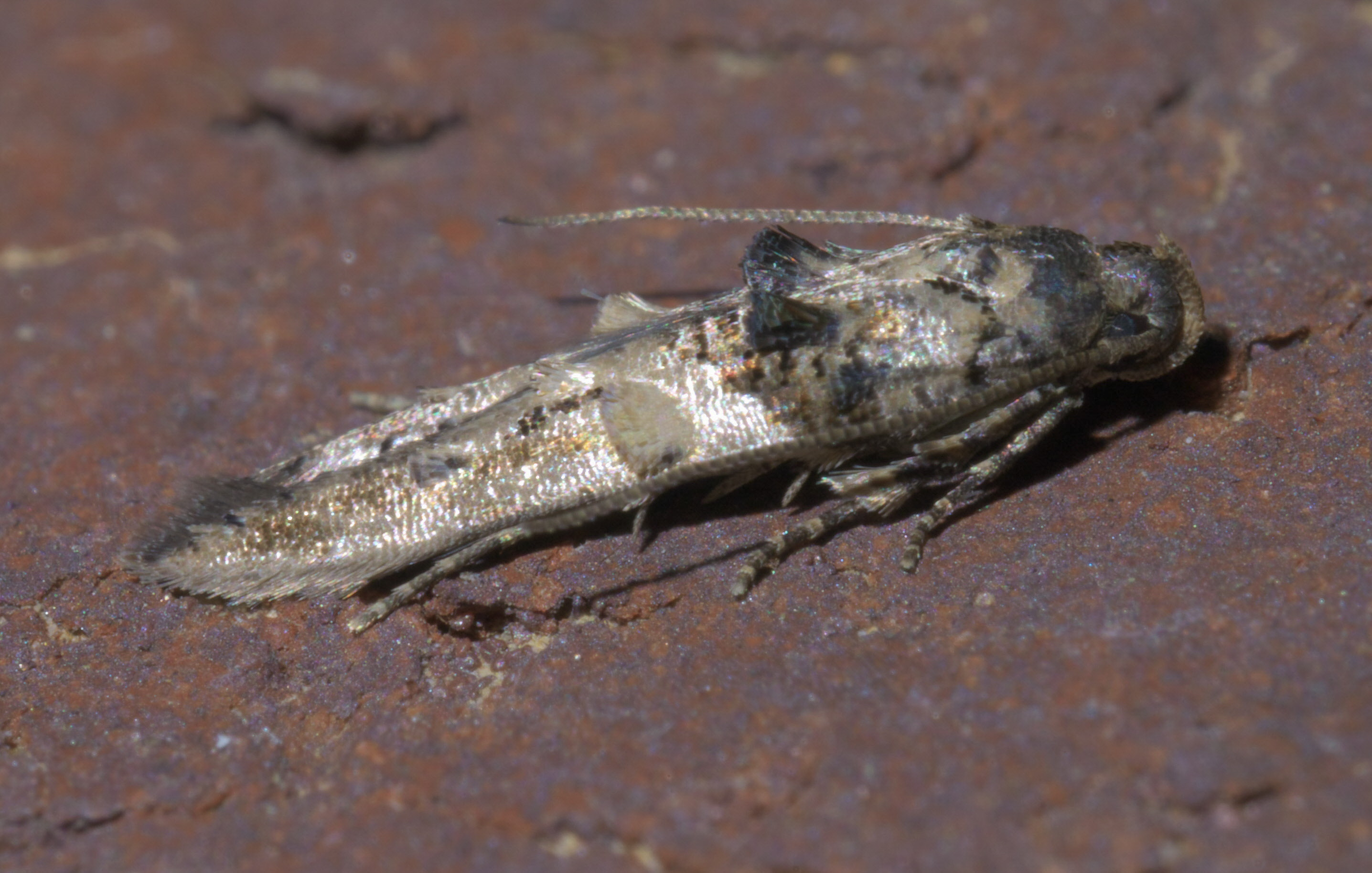

Scientific classification
- Kingdom: Animalia
- Phylum: Arthropoda
- Clade: Pancrustacea
- Class: Insecta
- Order: Lepidoptera
- Family: Cosmopterigidae
- Subfamily: Chrysopeleiinae
- Genus: Walshia; Clemens, 1864

= Walshia =

Genus of moths

Walshia is a genus of moths in the family Cosmopterigidae.

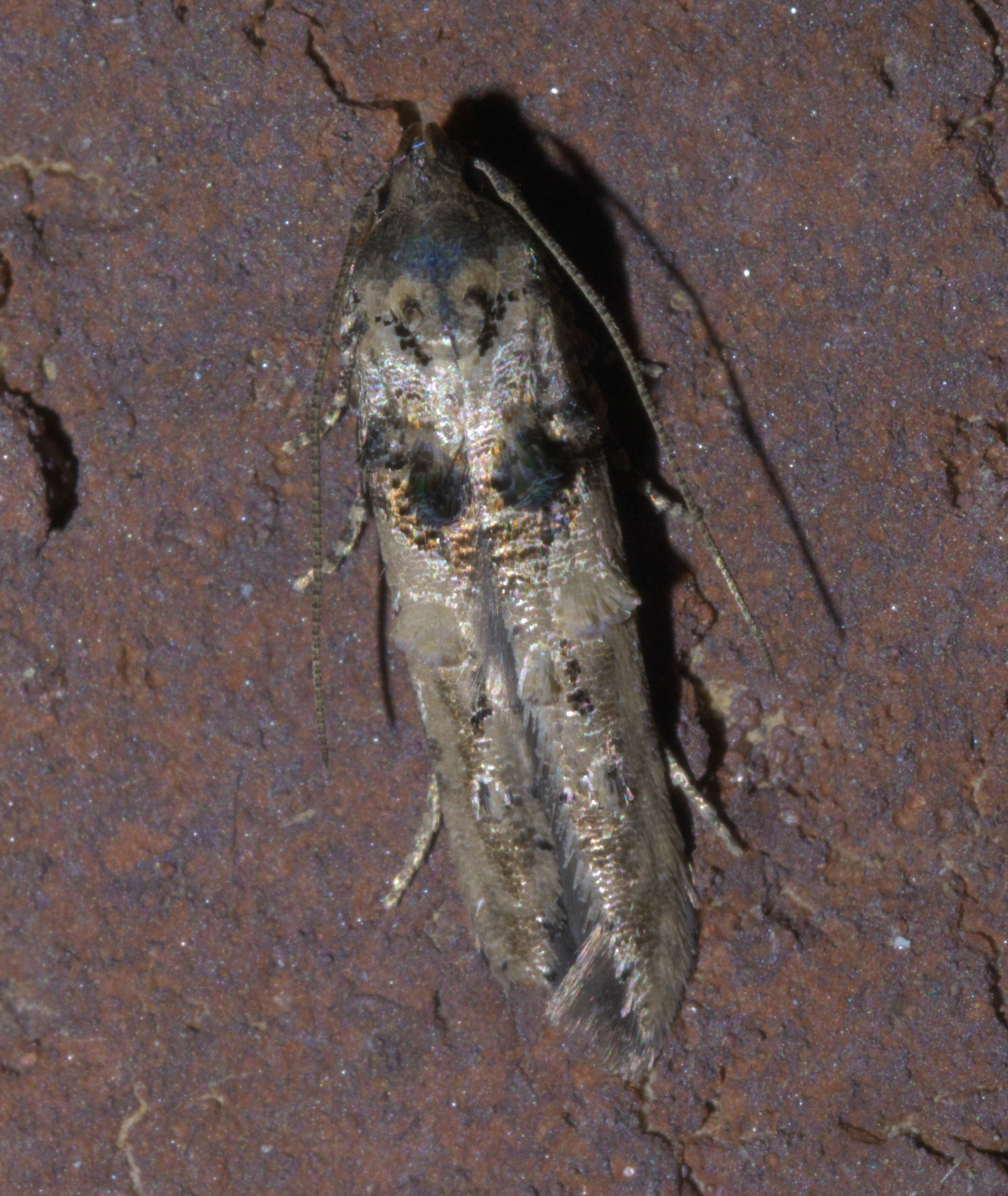
Walshia

== Species ==
- Walshia albicornella Busck, 1914
- Walshia amorphella Clemens, 1864
- Walshia calcarata Walsingham, 1909
- Walshia detracta Walsingham, 1909
- Walshia dispar Hodges, 1961
- Walshia elegans Hodges, 1978
- Walshia exemplata Hodges, 1961
- Walshia floridensis Hodges, 1978
- Walshia miscecolorella (Chambers, 1875) (syn: Walshia miscecalonella Chambers, 1875)
- Walshia particornella (Busck, 1919)
- Walshia pentapyrga (Meyrick, 1922)
- Walshia similis Hodges, 1961
