= Walshia amorphella =

Scientific classification
- Kingdom: Animalia
- Phylum: Arthropoda
- Clade: Pancrustacea
- Class: Insecta
- Order: Lepidoptera
- Family: Cosmopterigidae
- Genus: Walshia
- Species: W. amorphella

Binomial name
- Walshia amorphella Clemens, 1864

Species of moth

Walshia amorphella is a moth in the family Cosmopterigidae. It was described by James Brackenridge Clemens in 1864. It is found in North America, where it has been recorded from Illinois, Iowa, Kentucky, Minnesota and from Kansas to Texas.
