= George Russell (horticulturist) =

English horticulturist (1857–1951)

- Born: 1857; Stillington, North Yorkshire
- Died: 15 October 1951 (aged 93–94)
- Known for: Development of Russell Hybrid Lupins
- Awards: 1937 Veitch Memorial Medal
- Scientific career
- Fields: Horticulture

Close up of a Russell hybrid lupine in a typical garden setting, UK, England

George Russell (1857–1951) was born in Stillington and lived in York, England. He is most notable for his work developing the Russell Hybrid Lupins. A gardener by occupation, he began experimenting with Lupins in his fifties, after being inspired by the sight of a vase of the flowers at the home of one of his employers.

== Career ==
In 2013, when the RHS held a vote to determine their 'plant of the centenary', Russell Hybrid Lupins were selected as the top plant to have debuted during the period 1933-1942 and voted second overall.

Some of the Lupins created by Russell were named after his friends and neighbours. These include the 'Mrs Micklethwaite', for the employer who originally inspired his work, and the 'Mrs Noel Terry' named after Kathleen Terry of the Terry's chocolate-manufacturing family. At one time there were 152 named varieties but in the years after Russell's death many of these were either lost to Cucumber mosaic virus or allowed to self-sow enabling them to revert to their original colours.

Over more than twenty years, he used natural pollination by bumble-bees to develop hybrids with flower spikes that were larger and more colourful than the original Lupinus polyphyllus. He was 79 when he first exhibited at Chelsea, and the Royal Horticultural Society awarded him the Veitch Memorial Medal in 1937 for his achievements.

Selective List of Russell Hybrid Lupins (with colours if known)

- Bluejacket : blue and white
- Catherine of York
- Gallery White
- Gallery Yellow
- Helen of York
- Joan of York
- Masterpiece
- Manhattan Lights
- Mrs Micklethwaite
- Mrs Noel Terry : pink
- My Castle
- Nellie B. Allen : salmon pink
- Noble Maiden
- Purple Swirl
- The Chatelaine
- The Governor
- Thundercloud : purple and mauve
