= Walshia albicornella =

Scientific classification
- Domain: Eukaryota
- Kingdom: Animalia
- Phylum: Arthropoda
- Class: Insecta
- Order: Lepidoptera
- Family: Cosmopterigidae
- Genus: Walshia
- Species: W. albicornella

Binomial name
- Walshia albicornella Busck, 1914

Synonyms
- Mompha albicornella

Species of moth

Walshia albicornella is a moth in the family Cosmopterigidae. It was described by August Busck in 1914. It is found in Panama.
