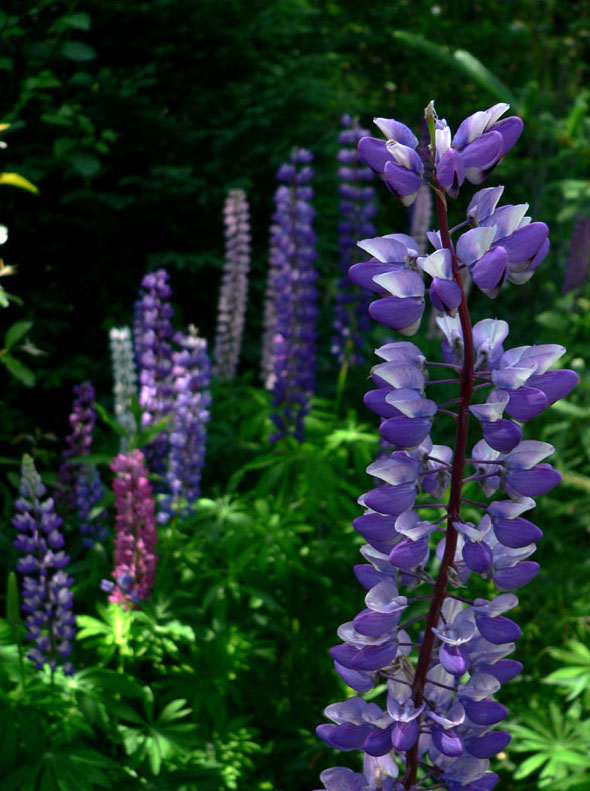
- Sundial lupine (Lupinus perennis)

Scientific classification
- Kingdom: Plantae
- Clade: Tracheophytes
- Clade: Angiosperms
- Clade: Eudicots
- Clade: Rosids
- Order: Fabales
- Family: Fabaceae
- Subfamily: Faboideae
- Genus: Lupinus
- Subgenus: Lupinus subg. Platycarpos (S.Wats.) Kurl.

Type species
- Lupinus densiflorus Benth.

Species
- up to 500; see Lupinus

Synonyms
- Platycarpos S.Wats. 1873; Platycarpos Aschers. et Graebn. 1907

= Lupinus subg. Platycarpos =

Subgenus of legumes

The genus Lupinus L. and, in particular, its North American species, were divided by Sereno Watson (1873) into three parts: Lupinus, Platycarpos and Lupinnelus. Differences in habit and in the number of ovules were accepted as the basis for this classification. A majority of perennial and annual species from the American continent described by Watson were referred to Lupinus. To the Platycarpos section were attributed some annual species with two ovules in the ovary and two seeds in the pod (L. densiflorus Benth., L. microcarpus Sims. and others). The section Lupinnelus consisted of one species (L. uncialis), with axillary and solitary flowers, scarcely reflexed banner, and also with two ovules in the ovary.

This principle of classification was extended by Ascherson and Graebner (1907) to cover all lupins from the eastern and western hemispheres. Lupinus L. was for the first time subdivided into two subgenera: A. Eulupinus and B. Platycarpos (Ascherson and Graebner, 1907). Quantity of ovules (seedbuds) in the ovary and seeds in the pod was also accepted as the criterion for this division. Most of the described species from the eastern and western hemispheres were referred to subgen. A. Eulupinus. Subgen. B. Platycarpos included several annual species from the eastern hemisphere with two seedbuds and seeds in the bean (the same species, as the one specified by S. Watson).

Subgen. Platycarpos (S.Wats.) Kurl. in new combination integrates the numerous perennial and annual species from the Western hemisphere, both groups having two and more ovules or seedbuds in the ovary, while subgen. Lupinus L. includes 12 species from the Mediterranean region and Africa with at least four ovules or seedbuds in the ovary.

Subgen. Platycarpos (S.Wats.) Kurl. 1989, Bull. N.I.Vavilov Inst. Plant Industry 193:24. - §2. PLATYCARPOS S.Wats. 1873, Proc. Amer. Acad. Arts Sci. 8:522; B. Platycarpos Aschers. et Graebn. 1907, Mitteleurop. Fl. 6,2:232; §1. LUPINUS S.Wats. 1873, l.c.:518, p.max.p; A. Eulupinus Aschers. et Graebn. 1907, Mitteleurop. Fl. 6,2:221, p.p. – New World's or flat-fruited lupins.

The ovary contains two and more ovules or seedbuds. The seed are predominantly small-sized, with an underdeveloped embryo and small amount of endosperm. Cotyledons are small-sized, with long caulicles. The first pair of true leaves is alternate. The stem is predominantly naked with waxen coating. Dominating is the monopodial type of branching. Leaflets are smooth, with waxen coating or slight pubescence, predominantly narrow. Pods are flat or orbicular, with two or more seeds. Represented by frutcuilose, fruticose and herbaceous perennial forms, or less often annual ones. Plants are cross-pollinated. 2n = 36, 48, 96. The type of subgenus: L. densiflorus Benth.

Geographic distribution: North, Central and South America, predominantly in the mining systems of the Andes and Cordillera. Some species are cultivated (L. mutabilis Sweet., L. polyphyllus Lindl.). This subgenus includes several hundreds of species (from 100 up to 500) requiring further analysis of their authenticity.
