= Boguslav Kurlovich =

Russian-Finnish scientist (born 1948)

Boguslav Stanislavovich Kurlovich
- Born: 18 January 1948 (age 78); Vitebsk, Soviet Union (present-day Vitebsk, Belarus)
- Occupations: Agronomist, Biologist
- Known for: Plant genetic resources, Leguminous plants, Lupinus
- Scientific career
- Fields: Botany; Genetics; Plant breeding
- Author abbrev. (botany): Kurl.

Boguslav Stanislavovich Kurlovich (Russian: Богуслав Станиславович Курлович; Polish: Bogusław Kurłowicz; born 18 January 1948) is a Russian-Finnish scientific agronomist of Polish descent. He specializes in the field of plant genetic resources, botany, plant and fish breeding.

From 1973 to 1997, he worked at the Vavilov Institute of Plant Industry, Saint Petersburg, Russia. From 1997 to 2011 he worked at International North Express, Finland. He specialised in collecting and studying plant genetic resources as initial material for plant breeding. He participated in 15 plant collecting missions, explored different regions of the former USSR (Siberia, Far East, Kazakhstan, Caucasus, Middle Asia, Ukraine) as well as other countries (including Brazil, Peru, Argentina, Ecuador, Algeria, Portugal, Germany, Poland and Finland) to collect a wide diversity of leguminous plants and their wild relatives, used in plant breeding in Finland, Poland, Belarus, Russia, etc. Kurlovich has authored numerous taxa regarding Genus Lupinus L. and the author of many cultivars of lupin (cv. Pervenec, Truvor, Novozybkovsky). His development of the division of the genus Lupinus into two subgenera (Subgen. PLATYCARPOS (Wats.) Kurl. and Subgen. LUPINUS) based on the geographical principle allows a better understanding of the volume of this huge genus, numbering from 200 to 1,000 species.

Kurlovich has developed Vavilov's doctrines with reference to lupins. Vavilov's ideas regarding the law of homologous series in hereditary variation gives the answer to the question of which material should be sought, while the theory of the centers of origin of cultivated plants responds to the question of where it should be sought. With reference to Lupinus, Vavilov considered the Mediterranean region and mountain areas of Mexico, Peru and others American countries as the centers of origin for this genus. Kurlovich, based on the differential systematic-geographical method of plants studies provided for more precise definition of the centers of formation and origin (diversity) of some lupin species.

According to Kurlovich's data, the center of formation of wild white lupin (Lupinus albus L.) and the primary center of origin (diversity) of its initial cultivated forms is the Balkans where an exceptionally wide diversity of wild and local forms as well as those that turned wild is concentrated. All three subspecies of white lupin (subsp. graecus Franko et Silva, subsp. termis Ponert., subsp. albus) occur on the Balkans, and it is mainly in this region that wild forms with dotted dark-brown seeds and dark-blue flowers are found (subsp. graecus). Additional confirmation is the Greek name of white lupin: “thermos” (hot). The centers of diversity of cultivated white lupin also include the Apennines and Egypt where cultivated forms of white lupin originated in the ancient times. Moreover, in the ancient Egypt forms with pink-and-blue or light-pink flowers were spread (subsp. termis), and on the Apennines forms with grayish-and-light-blue or white flowers were distributed (subsp. albus. Prof. Boguslav S. Kurlovich is the author of about 100 important scientific publications.

== Books ==
- Kurlovich, Boguslav S. et al. 1995. The Gene Bank and breeding of grain Legumes (lupine, vetch, soya and bean). THEORETICAL BASIS of PLANT BREEDING, vol.3, St. Petersburg, VIR; 430 pages.
- Kurlovich, Boguslav S. (ed.). 2002. Lupins: Geography, classification, genetic resources and breeding. St. Petersburg, Publishing house "Intan", ISBN 5-86741-034-X ; 468 pages.
