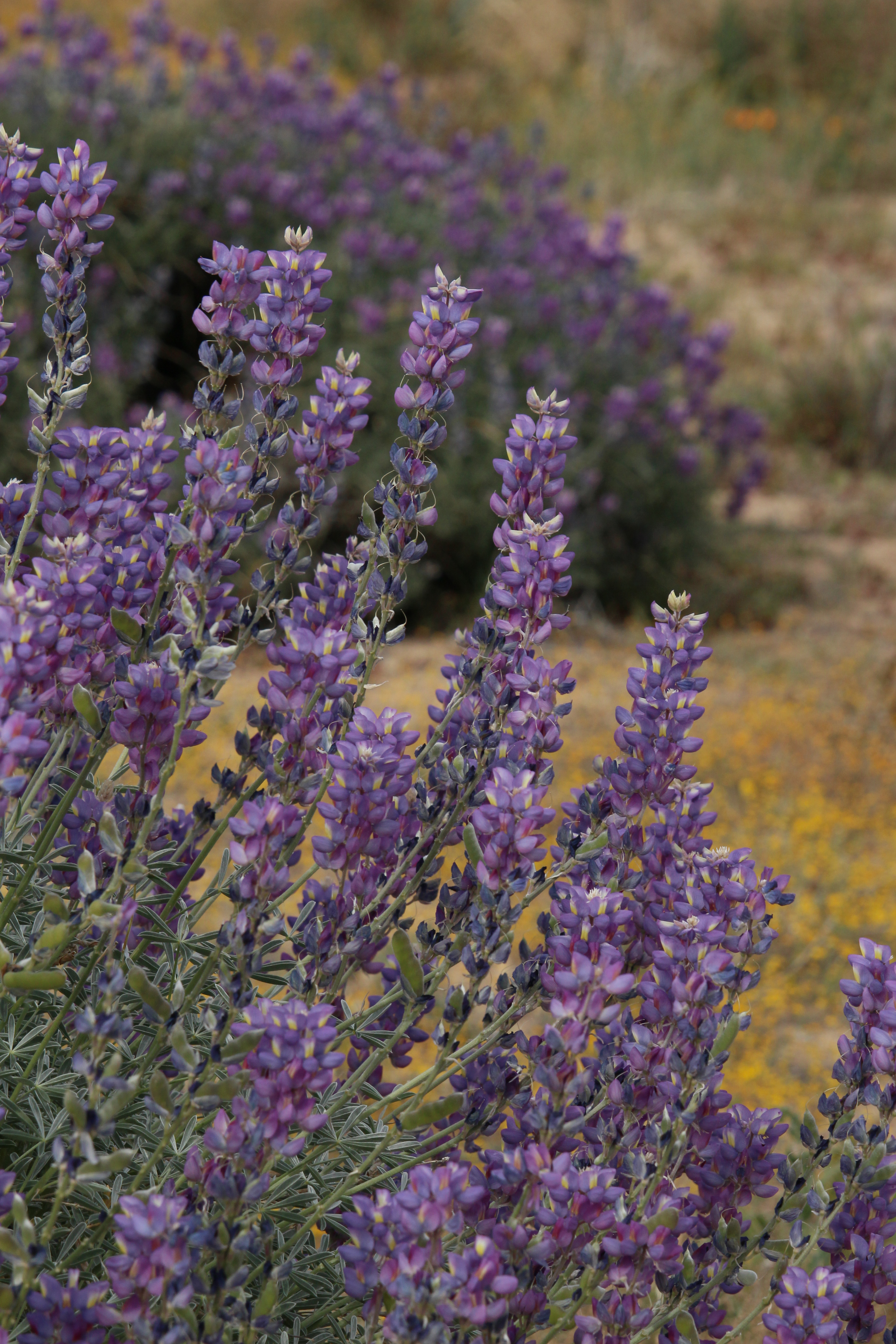

Scientific classification
- Kingdom: Plantae
- Clade: Tracheophytes
- Clade: Angiosperms
- Clade: Eudicots
- Clade: Rosids
- Order: Fabales
- Family: Fabaceae
- Subfamily: Faboideae
- Genus: Lupinus
- Species: L. excubitus

Binomial name
- Lupinus excubitus M. E. Jones

= Lupinus excubitus =

Species of legume

Lupinus excubitus is a species of lupine known as the grape soda lupine. Its common name refers to its sweet scent, which is said to be very reminiscent of grape soda. This species and its variants are found in Southwestern United States, especially in California and Nevada, e.g., Death Valley and Joshua Tree National Parks, and northwestern Mexico.

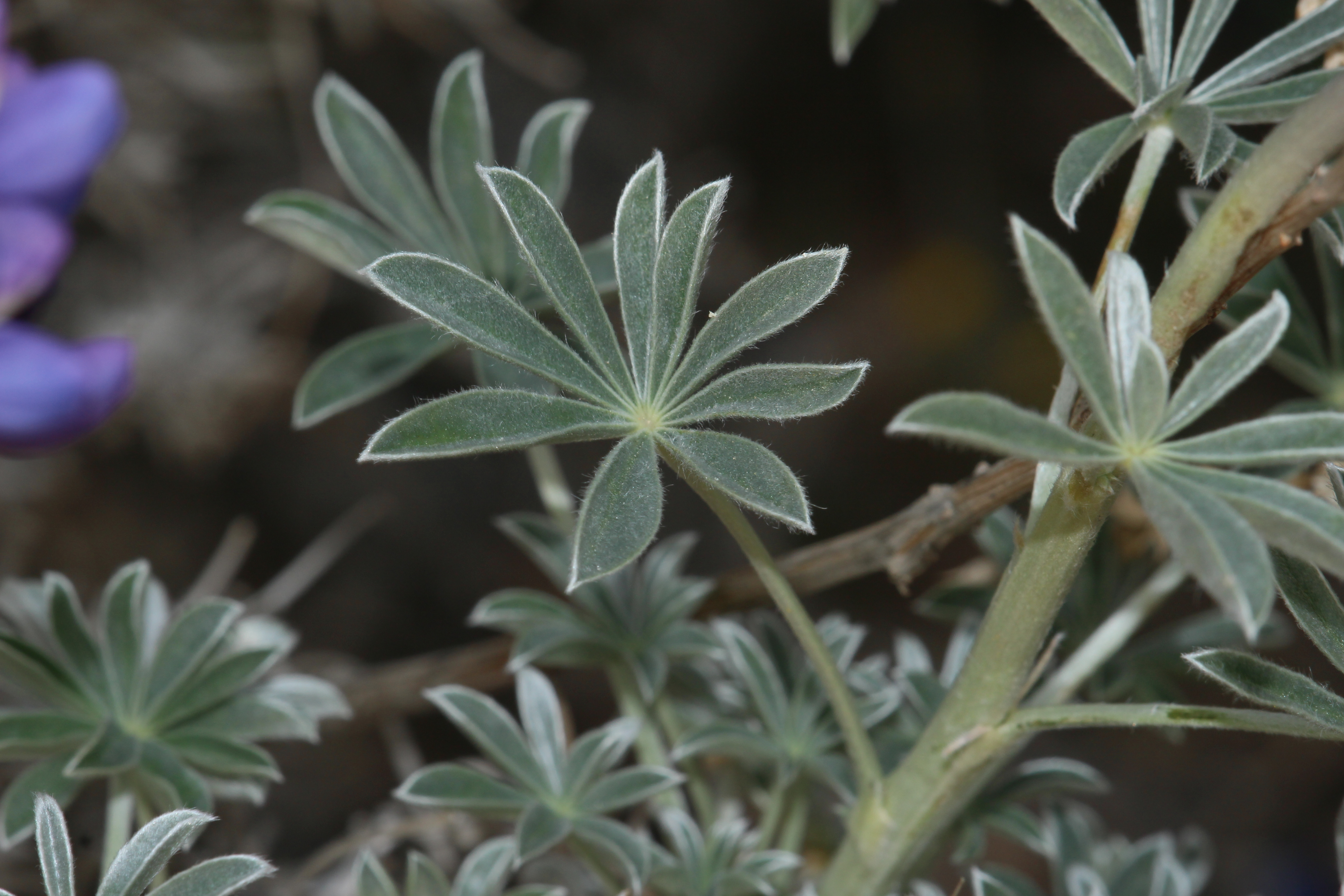
Leaves are generally covered with short silvery hairs.

== Description ==
Lupinus excubitus is a small shrub with gray-green foliage. The fan-shaped leaves are borne on the stem and may be clustered at the base. Generally covered with silvery hairs, each is made up of 7 to 10 narrow 5–50 millimetres (0.2–2.0 in) leaflets. The raceme inflorescence is a tall stalk of rich purple flowers, each with a bright yellow spot. The occasional variant has white flowers. The fruit is a silky legume pod up to 5 centimetres (2.0 in) in length containing mottled brown seeds.

There are several named variants of this species, including:

- L. e. var. austromontanus – southern mountain lupine
- L. e. var. excubitus – grape soda lupine, Inyo bush lupine
- L. e. var. hallii – Hall's bush lupine
- L. e. var. johnstonii – interior bush lupine
- L. e. var. medius – Mountain Springs bush lupine, Colorado bush lupine
