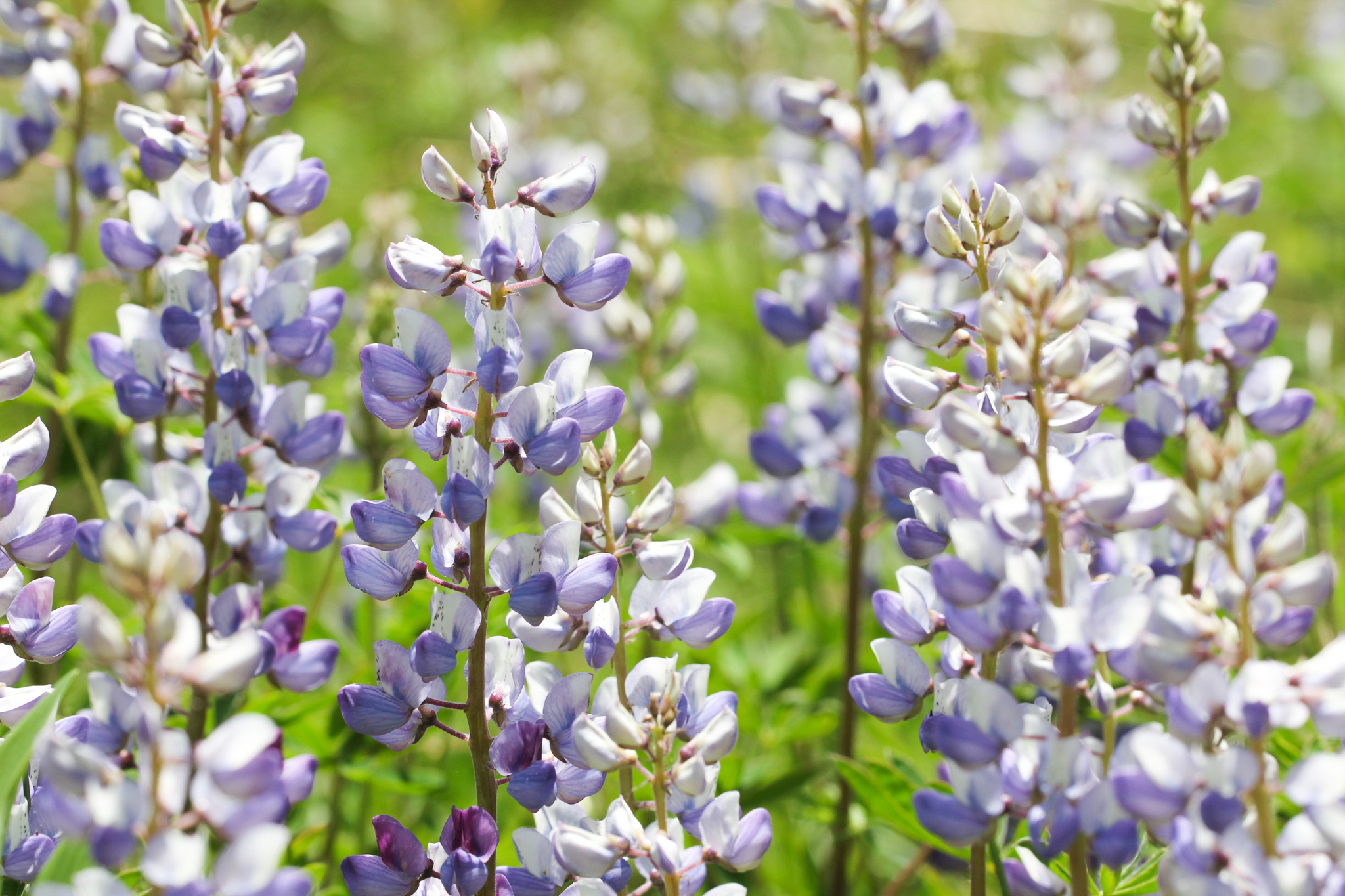
- At Illinois Beach State Park in Lake County, Illinois

Scientific classification
- Kingdom: Plantae
- Clade: Tracheophytes
- Clade: Angiosperms
- Clade: Eudicots
- Clade: Rosids
- Order: Fabales
- Family: Fabaceae
- Subfamily: Faboideae
- Genus: Lupinus
- Subgenus: Lupinus subg. Platycarpos
- Species: L. perennis

Binomial name
- Lupinus perennis L.

= Lupinus perennis =

Species of legume

Lupinus perennis (also wild perennial lupine, wild lupine, sundial lupine, blue lupine, Indian beet, or old maid's bonnets) is a flowering plant in the family Fabaceae.

== Description ==
The leaves are palmately compound with 7–11 leaflets arranged radially. Their stalks are numerous, erect, striated, and slightly pubescent. The leaflets are obovate, with a blunted apex or pointed spear, and sparsely pubescent. Petioles are longer than leaflets; stipules are very small. The inflorescence is a terminal raceme that may be loosely spaced or weakly whorled. Flower color ranges from white and pink to blue and violet, with blue shades most commonly observed. The calyx is silky and lacks bractlets; its upper lip may be slightly notched while the lower lip is entire and nearly twice as long. The corolla is approximately three times longer than the calyx, and floral bracts are present early but fall off as the flowers mature. Following pollination, the plant produces a legume pod that is yellow-gray to brown, lightly hairy, and constricted between seeds, giving it a bead-like appearance. Pods typically contain five to six seeds, each oval in shape with a pale hilum.

Lupinus perennis is commonly mistaken for the Western species Lupinus polyphyllus (large-leaved lupine), which is commonly planted along roadsides. L. polyphyllus is not native to eastern North America, but has naturalized in areas in the upper Midwest and New England. L. polyphyllus has 11–17 leaflets that can reach 13 cm (5 in) in length, while L. perennis has 7–11 leaflets which only reach around 5 cm (2 in) in length.

== Reproduction and Seed Biology ==
Lupinus perennis reproduces exclusively by seed. Pods mature in mid-summer and dehisce explosively when dry, dispersing seeds short distances from the parent plant. Seeds possess a thick, impermeable seed coat that enforces physical dormancy and allows long-term persistence in the soil seed bank. Dormancy is primarily broken through scarification rather than light exposure, with optimal germination occurring at temperatures between approximately 24 and 29 °C. Enzymatic activity and stress-related plant hormones contribute to weakening the seed coat and initiating germination. Long-term storage experiments have demonstrated seed viability after more than seventeen years, highlighting the species’ capacity for persistence under unfavorable conditions.

== Distribution and habitat ==
Lupinus perennis is widespread in the eastern part of the USA (from Texas and Florida to Maine) and Minnesota, Canada (southern Ontario, Newfoundland and Labrador), and on the coasts of the Atlantic Ocean, where it grows in sandy areas such as dunes and savannas. The species is most commonly associated with well-drained, sandy soils and open, high-light habitats such as oak savannas, pine barrens, dunes, and sand plains. Many of these habitats are disturbance-dependent, and suppression of natural fire regimes has contributed to widespread population declines throughout the species’ range. Moreover, fires, feeding by large ungulates, and mowing can improve habitat quality for established lupines by changing soil quality, vegetative structure, and leaf litter depth.

== Ecology ==
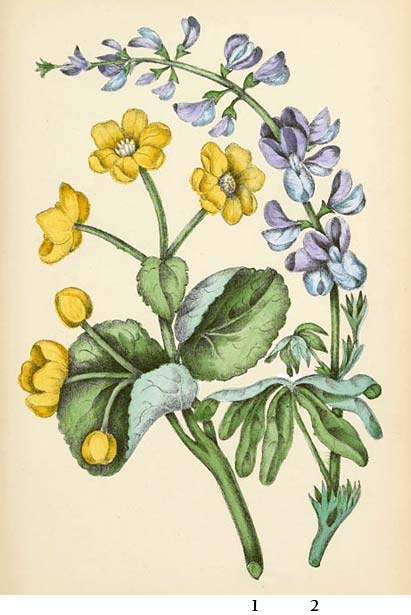
Lupinus perennis (blue flower) and Caltha palustris shown in a plate from Studies of Plant Life in Canada (1906)

Lupinus perennis is used as foodplants by the caterpillars of several Lepidoptera. Among these are the clouded sulphur, eastern tailed blue, gray hairstreak, silvery blue, wild indigo duskywing, frosted elfin (Callophrys irus), the eastern Persius duskywing (Erynnis persius persius), and the rare and endangered Karner blue (Plebejus samuelis), whose caterpillars feed only on the lupine leaves. Leaves that have been fed on by Karner blues have distinctive transparent areas where the larvae have selectively eaten only the green, fleshy parts. Lupinus perennis plays an important ecological role as both a pollinator resource and a nitrogen-fixing species. Like other legumes, it forms symbiotic relationships with nitrogen-fixing bacteria in root nodules, which enhances soil fertility in nutrient-poor environments. The species supports a wide range of insect visitors, particularly bees, and serves as a critical larval host plant for several Lepidoptera. Most notably, it is the sole larval host for the endangered Karner blue butterfly (Lycaeides melissa samuelis) as well as an important host for species such as the frosted elfin and Persius duskywing.

== Conservation ==
Populations of Lupinus perennis have declined substantially since the early twentieth century, with some regions experiencing losses exceeding ninety percent. These declines have had cascading ecological effects, particularly for obligate species such as the Karner blue butterfly(Rydberg, 1908). The lupine has been declining in number and range since the Industrial Revolution. It is estimated that it has declined in number by about 90% since 1900. This decline has in turn been deemed one of the primary causes of the decline of the Karner blue butterfly. The main threats to Lupinus perennis are thought to be habitat loss, wildfire suppression, habitat fragmentation, and poor management. Currently it is considered "rare" in Pennsylvania, a species of special concern in Rhode Island, threatened in Iowa, Maryland, and New Hampshire; it is endangered in Vermont, and is extirpated from Maine.

Human development has eliminated a large portion of its viable habitat. Remaining habitat is often fragmented, which is problematic for the lupine because it limits the range over which it can reproduce. Viable lupine habitat is often difficult to maintain because it flourishes after fires and other forms of disturbance.One reason this occurs is that lupine seed coats are so tough that only pressure changes due to rapid heating or abrasion are strong enough to allow water to penetrate and start germination. Moreover, fires, feeding by large ungulates, and mowing can improve habitat quality for established lupines by changing soil quality, vegetative structure, and leaf litter depth.

Impacts of primary habitat loss have led to decreasing populations which are small and scattered which makes it harder for pollination to occur. Changes in land management such as prescribed burning, mowing, and mechanical thinning, would help protect and promote this plant and other plant diversity. Further research is still needed for future interventions.
