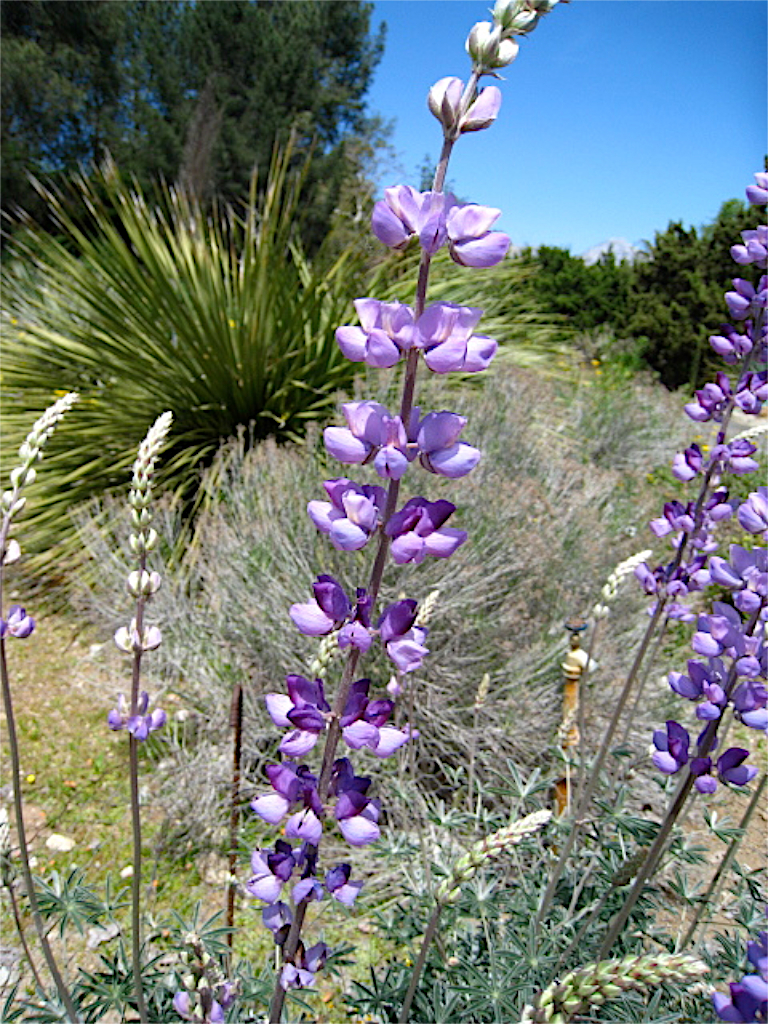

Scientific classification
- Kingdom: Plantae
- Clade: Tracheophytes
- Clade: Angiosperms
- Clade: Eudicots
- Clade: Rosids
- Order: Fabales
- Family: Fabaceae
- Subfamily: Faboideae
- Genus: Lupinus
- Species: L. longifolius

Binomial name
- Lupinus longifolius (S.Watson) Abrams

= Lupinus longifolius =

Species of legume

Lupinus longifolius is a species of lupine known by the common name longleaf bush lupine.

It is native to the coastal mountain ranges and hillsides of southern California and Baja California, where it grows in local habitat in the canyons and slopes, such as coastal sage scrub and chaparral.

== Description ==
Lupinus longifolius is a bushy, erect shrub which can reach a maximum height around 1.5 meters. Each palmate leaf is divided into 5 to 10 leaflets up to 6 centimeters long. The herbage is green or gray-green and coated in short, silvery hairs.

The inflorescence is long, narrow raceme of many flowers each between 1 and 2 centimeters in length. The flower is purple or blue, sometimes with a whitish patch on its banner. The fruit is a dark-colored, hairy legume pod containing 6 to 8 seeds.
