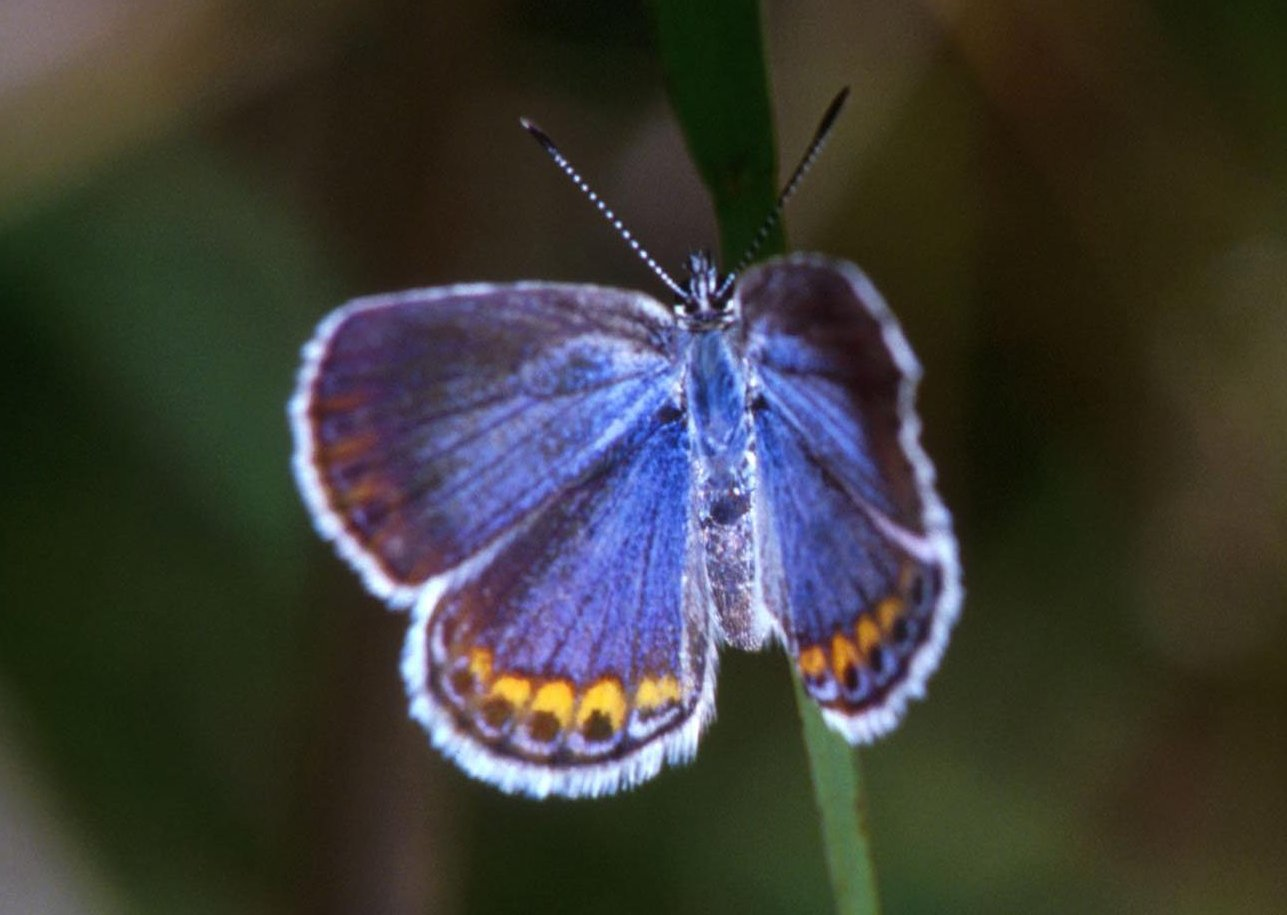

Conservation status
- Critically Imperiled (NatureServe)

- Endangered (ESA)

Scientific classification
- Kingdom: Animalia
- Phylum: Arthropoda
- Clade: Pancrustacea
- Class: Insecta
- Order: Lepidoptera
- Family: Lycaenidae
- Genus: Plebejus
- Species: P. samuelis

Binomial name
- Plebejus samuelis Nabokov, 1944

Synonyms
- Plebejus melissa samuelis; Lycaeides melissa samuelis (Nabokov, 1944)

= Karner blue =

Species of butterfly native to the Great Lakes region and northeastern North America

The Karner blue (Plebejus samuelis) is a small blue butterfly native to the Great Lakes region and northeastern North America. It is closely associated with oak savanna and pine barrens habitats because its larvae feed exclusively on wild lupine (Lupinus perennis). The species once occurred in a narrow, nearly continuous band across twelve U.S. states and southern Ontario, Canada. The United States Fish and Wildlife Service currently identifies surviving populations in portions of Wisconsin, Michigan, New York, New Hampshire, and Ohio.

The butterfly has undergone extensive range contraction caused principally by habitat loss, fragmentation, and the ecological succession of formerly open savanna and barrens habitat. Fire suppression has contributed to this process by allowing shrubs and trees to shade out wild lupine and flowering plants required by the butterfly.

The Karner blue was listed as endangered under the United States Endangered Species Act on 14 December 1992. It is the official state butterfly of New Hampshire, designated the same year under RSA 3:18.

In Canada, the butterfly has not been reported since 1991 and is considered extirpated. The Committee on the Status of Endangered Wildlife in Canada designated it extirpated in April 1997, and confirmed that status in 2000, 2010, and 2019.

== Taxonomy and naming ==
Vladimir Nabokov, better known as a novelist but also an accomplished lepidopterist, described the Karner blue in 1944. It was traditionally treated as a subspecies of the Melissa blue, under the name Lycaeides melissa samuelis.

Nabokov himself came to regard the butterfly as a distinct species, noting that the male genitalia of the Karner blue were remarkably constant across its range while those of the Melissa blue varied geographically, and that the Karner blue used a single larval host plant where the Melissa blue used many. He never completed the taxonomic work required to elevate it, and subspecific status remained the accepted treatment for decades.

Population genetic research published by Forister and colleagues found that gene flow between the Karner blue and the Melissa blue was low, comparable to gene flow between the Melissa blue and Lycaeides idas, which are treated as distinct taxa. The authors concluded that subspecific rank was inappropriate and that the butterfly should be recognised at species level. Subsequent Canadian assessments adopted the species-level classification Plebejus samuelis. COSEWIC noted in 2019 that the placement was also supported by morphological differences and by the geographic separation of the Karner blue in Ontario from the Melissa blue in western Canada.

The legal listing of the butterfly under the U.S. Endangered Species Act continues to use the older name Lycaeides melissa samuelis. Ontario changed the scientific name used on its Species at Risk list to Plebejus samuelis on January 26, 2022, following the taxonomy used by NatureServe. The province stated that the taxonomic change did not alter its legal protection.

The common name refers to Karner, New York, a hamlet between Albany and Schenectady near the Albany Pine Bush, where the butterfly was first described. Nabokov later described a group of the butterflies in his novel Pnin, although he did not identify them by name.

== Description ==
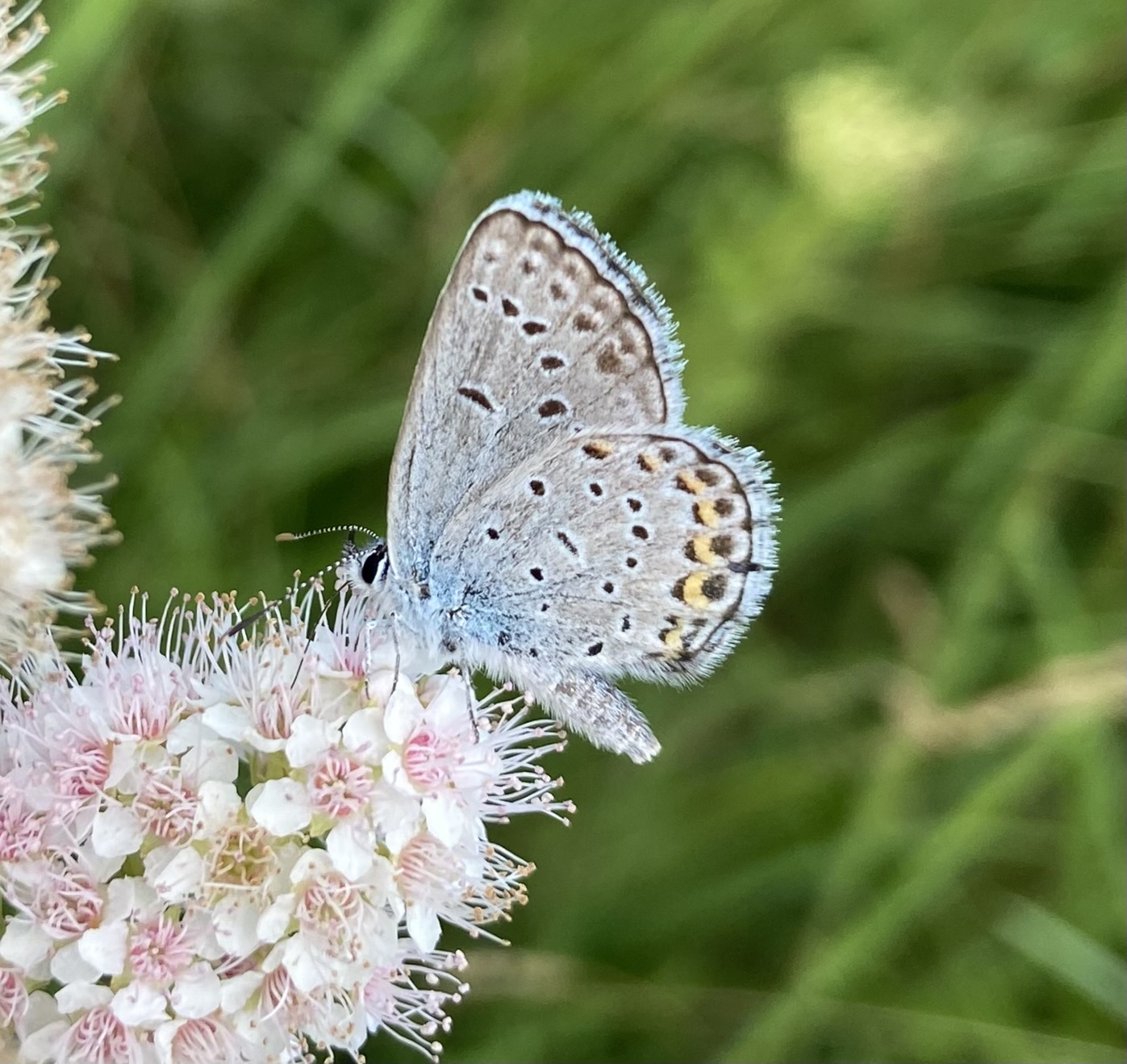
Female Karner blue nectaring on a flower in Concord, New Hampshire. The orange crescents along the wings are characteristic of females.

The Karner blue is a small butterfly with a wingspan of approximately 2.5 cm (0.98 in). Forewing length is 1.2 to 1.4 cm in males and 1.4 to 1.6 cm in females. The sexes differ in dorsal coloration. Males are usually silvery blue to deep blue above, with narrow black margins and a white outer fringe. Females are darker and may range from blue to purple-brown or grayish brown. They have a row of dark spots and orange crescents along the outer portions of the wings.

The underside of both sexes is pale gray or silver-gray, with black spots and orange crescents near the outer margins. These underside markings help separate the Karner blue from similar small blues within its range: the eastern tailed-blue, spring azure, silvery blue, and several other species lack the orange crescents beneath, while the eastern tailed-blue also bears small tails on the hindwing. The Melissa blue can be distinguished by orange banding on the upper surface of the female forewing, and Nabokov's blue (Lycaeides idas nabokovi) by its different habitat and host plant.

Eggs are about 0.7 mm across, flattened and pale greenish-white. Larvae are pea-green with a dark head capsule, pass through four instars, and bear glandular structures that mediate their interactions with ants. Pupae are bright green, turning light tan shortly before emergence.

== Life cycle ==
The Karner blue normally produces two generations, or broods, each year. Its life cycle is closely linked to the seasonal development of wild lupine.

Eggs laid by the second brood remain dormant through winter and hatch in mid- to late April. The larvae feed exclusively on the leaves of wild lupine for about three to four weeks before pupating in late May or early June. First-brood adults fly from late May through late June. Eggs produced by these adults develop during the same year and give rise to a second brood, whose adults appear from early or mid-July until mid- to late August, and in some years into early September. The second brood is typically three to four times the size of the first, although in some years it is not larger; high overwintering mortality of eggs is thought to account for the usual difference.

In historical Ontario populations, adults were recorded from approximately May 25 to June 30 for the first generation and from July 12 to August 18 for the second. Weather caused substantial year-to-year variation in these dates.

Adults are short-lived. Reported average lifespans range from under 3.5 days at Indiana Dunes National Park to four or five days elsewhere, with individuals occasionally surviving two to three weeks. Canadian studies summarized by COSEWIC reported an average of approximately five days.

== Distribution and habitat ==
The historical range of the Karner blue formed a narrow, nearly continuous band extending from the western Great Lakes region eastward to New England and southern Ontario. The U.S. Fish and Wildlife Service states that it formerly occurred across twelve U.S. states and Ontario, but is now known from portions of only five states: Wisconsin, Michigan, New York, New Hampshire, and Ohio.

NatureServe regards the species as critically imperiled globally and notes that populations have disappeared from much of the historical range.

Wisconsin and Michigan support the greatest number of sites and individuals. In New York, the Albany Pine Bush, from which the species was described, had been reduced from roughly 25,000 acres to about 2,500 acres by 1988, and the largest New York population is at Saratoga Airport, where open habitat is maintained by regular mowing.

=== Canada ===
In Canada, the Karner blue was known only from southern Ontario. The most recent confirmed Canadian populations were at the Port Franks and Pinery Provincial Park area in Lambton County and at the St. Williams Conservation Reserve in Norfolk County. Historical records also exist from Toronto, London, and Sarnia. A possible historical occurrence near Cobourg in the Rice Lake Plains has been reported, although no associated specimen is known.

By the early 1980s, the butterfly had been reduced from six known Ontario localities to two surviving sites. The Port Franks population still contained more than 1,000 butterflies in 1984 and was considered relatively secure, while only seven second-brood individuals were recorded at St. Williams that year.

The remaining populations collapsed during the exceptionally hot and dry summers of 1988 and 1989. Wild lupine at the sites dried before the second brood could lay its eggs successfully. COSEWIC reported no confirmed observations at either site after that period. The federal recovery strategy identifies the last confirmed Canadian observations as occurring in 1988 at Port Franks, Pinery Provincial Park, and St. Williams. Unconfirmed reports continued between 1988 and 1991, but no Karner blue has been reported in Ontario since 1991 despite searches at historical sites and other areas containing wild lupine.

COSEWIC designated the species extirpated in Canada in April 1997. The status was re-examined and confirmed in May 2000, April 2010, and May 2019. It is listed as extirpated under Schedule 1 of the Canadian Species at Risk Act.

Ontario initially listed the butterfly as endangered when the province's Endangered Species Act, 2007 came into force in 2008. It was reclassified as extirpated on February 18, 2009.

Ontario's natural heritage databases follow the NatureServe element occurrence methodology, under which an occurrence record documents an area in which a species is, or was, present. Historical records for the Karner blue therefore remain mapped at Ontario sites where the butterfly no longer occurs, and the presence of such a record on a distribution map does not indicate that a population was extant on the date the map was produced.

=== Habitat ===
The Karner blue is associated principally with dry, sandy ecosystems that support wild lupine, including oak savannas, pine barrens, sandy woodland openings, dunes, and related early-successional habitats.

Suitable habitat requires disturbance to prevent ecological succession from producing a closed tree and shrub canopy. Historically, wildfire helped maintain these open conditions. Modern Karner blue populations can also occur in human-maintained habitats such as utility rights-of-way, roadsides, airports, old fields, young forest stands, and military training areas where mowing, clearing, fire, or other disturbance prevents canopy closure. At Fort McCoy in Wisconsin, lupine stems disturbed by military vehicle traffic carried significantly more larval feeding damage than undisturbed stems.

==== Canopy cover and habitat structure ====
A mixture of open and partially shaded habitat is important, because the requirements of adults, larvae, the two broods, and the two sexes differ.

Adults use open, sunny areas for nectaring, roosting, and mate location; males spend the large majority of their activity in open habitat. Temperature is part of the explanation. Adult activity falls off below about 75 °F (24 °C), and modelling of flight thresholds indicated that first-flight females had on average 10.5 hours of activity available per day in open habitat, compared with one to two hours in partial or closed canopy.

Ovipositing females are more evenly spread across canopy conditions than males, and at Indiana Dunes National Park the average canopy cover measured at oviposition sites was about 55 per cent. Larval survival is generally highest under partial to closed canopy, principally because shade-grown lupine is a better larval food and senesces later. Lupine is nevertheless more abundant in open areas, so a trade-off exists between the quantity of lupine in openings and its quality in shade. This trade-off is the principal reason that a heterogeneous landscape supports larger and more stable populations than a uniform one.

Populations can persist in structurally uniform habitat where management substitutes for that heterogeneity, as at Saratoga Airport in New York. Patch size and spacing also matter: occupied lupine patches tend to be larger and closer to other occupied patches than unoccupied ones, and the recovery plan treats subpopulations in patches smaller than 0.25 hectares (0.62 acres) as vulnerable to extirpation.

== Ecology ==
=== Wild lupine ===
Wild lupine (Lupinus perennis) is the only known larval food plant of the Karner blue. Consequently, the abundance, distribution, condition, and seasonal persistence of lupine are fundamental limits on Karner blue habitat.

Lupine grows best in relatively open habitats with sandy soils and periodic disturbance. Excessive shading can eliminate the plant, while very exposed sites can become hot and dry enough for lupine to senesce early in the summer. This creates a need for a heterogeneous landscape containing both sunny and partly shaded patches.

The quality of lupine foliage also affects larval development. Feeding trials found that larvae given leaves from shade-grown plants that had gone to seed grew faster than those given sun-grown plants at the same stage, and that larvae fed water-stressed or wilted foliage developed more slowly and survived less well. Relationships have also been reported between canopy cover, leaf nitrogen concentration, mildew infection, and larval growth, although the importance of individual factors varies among sites and seasons.

During the drought summer of 1995 at Fort McCoy, Wisconsin, lupine in open areas senesced while plants in shade remained green, and second-brood larvae were correspondingly more abundant in shaded patches.

=== Adult feeding ===
Adult Karner blues feed on nectar from many flowering species rather than depending exclusively on lupine. Adults have been recorded nectaring at flowers of 39 herbaceous and 9 woody species during the first brood, and 70 herbaceous and 2 woody species during the second. Frequently used species include butterfly milkweed, spotted beebalm, New Jersey tea, flowering spurge, northern dewberry, common cinquefoil, lyrate rockcress, goldenrods, and several non-native plants. Studies at Indiana Dunes found that butterflies usually chose whichever nearby species offered the greatest number of flowers, suggesting opportunistic selection, but that a few species were nonetheless preferred when alternatives were available.

The availability of nectar throughout both adult flight periods is an important habitat requirement, and the broods differ in the species they use because of differences in flowering phenology. Management programs therefore seek to maintain a diverse mixture of flowering plants, in both open and partly shaded conditions, in addition to wild lupine. Planting non-native nectar sources is discouraged because of their potential effects on native plants, particularly lupine.

=== Association with ants ===
Karner blue caterpillars have a facultative mutualistic relationship with several ant species. Larvae produce sugary secretions that attract ants; in return, tending ants can protect larvae against some predators and parasitoids. In pitch pine–scrub oak habitat in New York, 67 per cent of ant-tended larvae survived, compared with 38 per cent of untended larvae. Laboratory work found that tended larvae also grew faster and gained more weight per unit of lupine eaten.

More than forty ant species have been recorded tending Karner blue larvae, drawn from the Formicinae, Myrmicinae, and Dolichoderinae. Tending rates approach 100 per cent for late-instar larvae, and pupae are also frequently tended. The relationship is not obligatory, and the degree of benefit varies according to the ant species involved and local conditions, so it is uncertain whether habitat needs to be managed specifically to maintain ant populations.

=== Predators and parasitoids ===
Karner blue eggs, larvae, pupae, and adults are consumed by a variety of predators. Documented or suspected predators include spiders, paper wasps, predatory bugs, beetles, robber flies, dragonflies, birds, and other insects. White-tailed deer may also consume immature stages incidentally while feeding on lupine. The introduced seven-spotted lady beetle (Coccinella septempunctata) is one of the few confirmed predators of Karner blue larvae.

Some ant species that tend larvae have also been observed removing or opening eggs, and the reason for this apparent contradiction is not understood. Several wasps and at least one tachinid fly have been reported as parasitoids. The ecological importance of predation and parasitism varies among sites and is less well understood than the effects of habitat availability.

=== Movement and habitat connectivity ===
Karner blues generally move relatively short distances, making the arrangement and connectivity of habitat patches important. A mark-release-recapture study at Indiana Dunes found that about three-quarters of recorded movements were under 100 m (330 ft) and that maximum ranges were below 1 km (0.62 mi); the authors recommended that suitable habitat patches be separated by less than 300 m (980 ft). The recovery plan concluded that distances likely to permit recolonization within a metapopulation fall in the range of 0.5–2 km (0.31–1.24 mi), depending on the canopy cover of the intervening land.

Suitable lupine and nectar patches separated by large areas of forest, development, or other unsuitable habitat may therefore function as isolated populations. Although most individual movements are short, the U.S. Fish and Wildlife Service reports that adults are capable of flying up to about 1.4 mi (2.3 km) across sufficiently open landscapes. Corridors containing both lupine and nectar plants have been proposed as a means of connecting habitat patches, although the recovery plan notes that evidence for both corridors and barriers remains largely anecdotal.

== Conservation ==
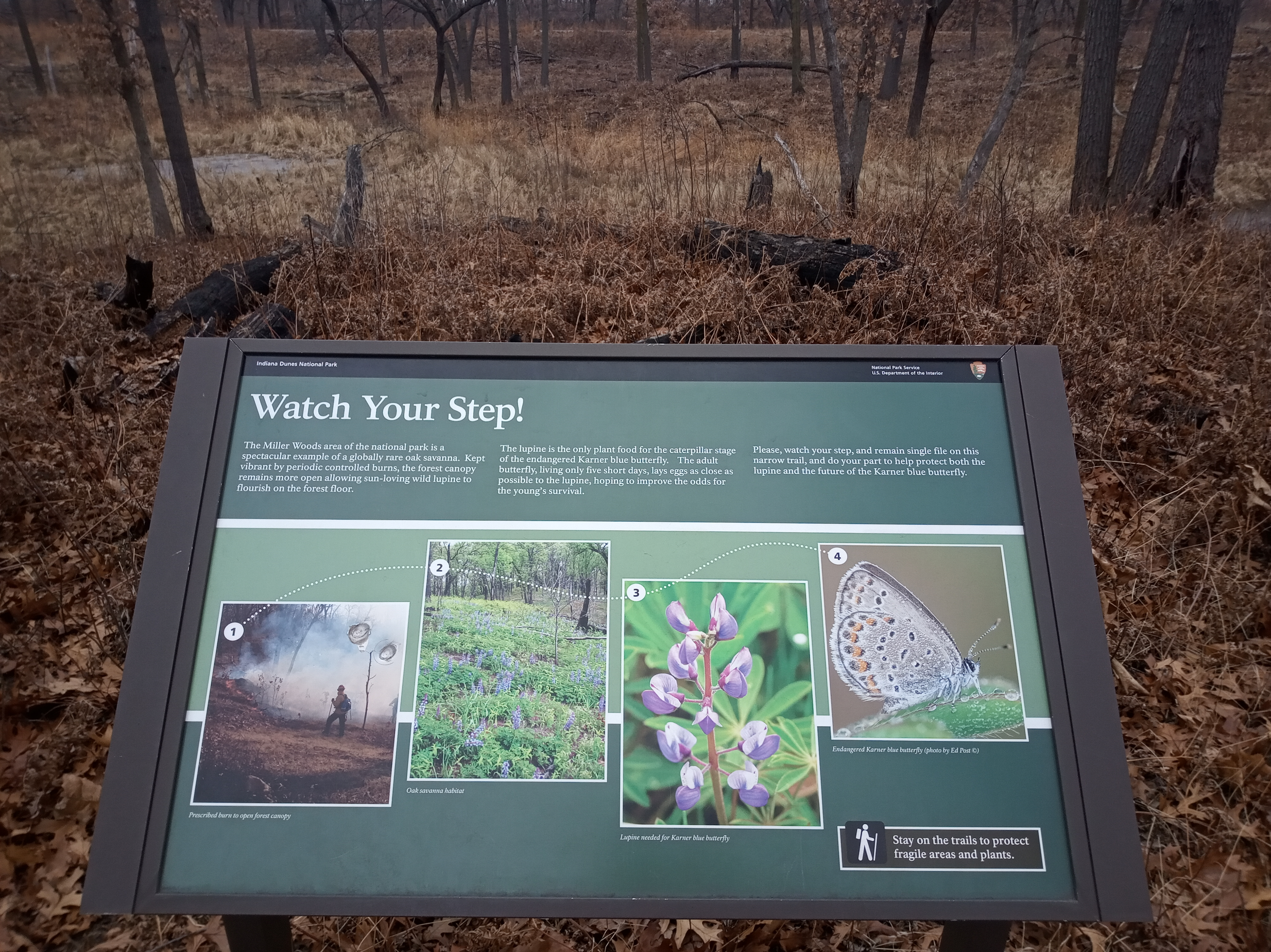
Trail signage concerning Karner blue conservation at Miller Woods in Indiana Dunes National Park.

=== Decline and threats ===
The principal historical cause of the Karner blue's decline has been the destruction and alteration of the open oak savanna and pine barrens ecosystems on which it depends. Conversion of land to agriculture, residential and commercial development, road construction, and other land uses directly eliminated habitat.

The suppression of wildfire produced a second major change. Without periodic disturbance, shrubs and trees invade formerly open habitats and shade out wild lupine and many nectar plants. This process can render otherwise undeveloped land unsuitable for the butterfly.

Habitat fragmentation further increases risk because many Karner blue populations are small and relatively isolated. Small populations can be eliminated by drought, severe weather, poorly timed habitat management, or other local events and may not be naturally recolonized.

Climate change is an additional concern. Temperature and precipitation influence lupine growth, adult flight periods, egg development, and the timing of the butterfly's two broods. The loss of the Indiana Dunes population following extreme heat and drought in 2012 has been studied as an example of a climate-related phenological mismatch, and was used as a case study in the Service's 2019 five-year review of the species.

=== United States ===
The Karner blue was listed as endangered under the U.S. Endangered Species Act on 14 December 1992, having been proposed for listing that January. A federal recovery plan was published in 2003. It sets out criteria based on the establishment of viable metapopulations across at least thirteen recovery units, with 27 metapopulations required for reclassification to threatened and 29 for delisting.

Wisconsin supports some of the largest remaining Karner blue populations and has implemented a statewide habitat conservation plan involving public and private land managers, covering roughly 250,000 acres. Necedah National Wildlife Refuge in central Wisconsin holds the largest known population of the species.

Reintroduction and captive-rearing programs have been used in several states, including at Concord, New Hampshire; West Gary, Indiana; and in Ohio. The last native New England population, in the Concord pine barrens, declined from an estimated 3,700 butterflies in 1983 to fewer than 50 by 1994 and was extirpated in 2000. A reintroduction program began the following year using stock from the Saratoga Airport population in New York, and captive rearing at a New Hampshire Army National Guard facility has continued since.

==== Habitat management ====
Conservation programs use prescribed fire, mowing, selective tree and shrub removal, lupine planting, nectar-plant restoration, captive propagation, and reintroduction. Management is generally conducted in sections or on rotations so that disturbance does not affect an entire population at once; the recovery plan recommends allowing at least two generations between repeat treatments of the same area and dividing important subpopulations into discrete management units.

Where burning is impractical, or where a site is too small for a population to survive a burn, mowing can maintain open conditions with little detectable harm. On restored oak savanna in south-central Wisconsin, Karner blue densities did not differ significantly between sites burned in summer, sites mowed in August, and untreated controls. The recovery plan recommends mowing at a blade height above 4 in (10 cm), annually or biennially in autumn or winter, with clippings left in place.

Practices identified as harmful include close-cropped grazing, frequent or poorly timed mowing, plowing, management that substantially increases deer populations, and the use of herbicides or insecticides that kill lupine, nectar plants, associated ants, or the butterflies themselves. Management of power-line corridors by cutting, mowing, or targeted herbicide application has been shown to increase the number and cover of nectar species.

=== Canada and possible reintroduction ===
Although the Karner blue is extirpated in Canada, habitat restoration has continued at several historical and potential recovery sites. Management has included prescribed burning, removal of woody vegetation, and the planting or restoration of wild lupine.

The federal recovery strategy concluded that the feasibility of restoring the species to Canada remains uncertain. Several potential Ontario reintroduction sites have been identified, but none met all of the requirements considered necessary to support a viable, interconnected population when the recovery strategy was prepared.

The strategy notes that a viable Karner blue population requires a substantial area of suitable habitat containing multiple connected local populations. Some Ontario lupine populations have increased through restoration, particularly in Norfolk County, but habitat remains limited and fragmented.

Captive propagation has been investigated as part of a possible Canadian reintroduction. Work associated with the Toronto Zoo indicated that Karner blues could be successfully reared for release in Ontario, and captive-rearing techniques developed in the United States provide additional experience for a future program.

Natural recolonization is considered extremely unlikely. Surviving U.S. populations are geographically isolated from historical Ontario sites, the species is not migratory, and normal dispersal distances are limited. COSEWIC concluded that restoration of the butterfly in Canada would therefore require human assistance, including habitat restoration, captive propagation, and reintroduction.

=== Climate adaptation ===
In 2023, the National Park Service published a synthesis examining the vulnerability of the Karner blue to climate change. The report discussed habitat management intended to increase resilience and considered more interventionist approaches, including the managed relocation of populations from the southern part of the range into areas expected to remain climatically suitable.

Because Karner blues depend on a disturbance-maintained habitat mosaic rather than simply the presence of wild lupine, conservation under a changing climate requires management of vegetation structure, nectar plants, canopy cover, habitat connectivity, and the timing and intensity of prescribed disturbance.
