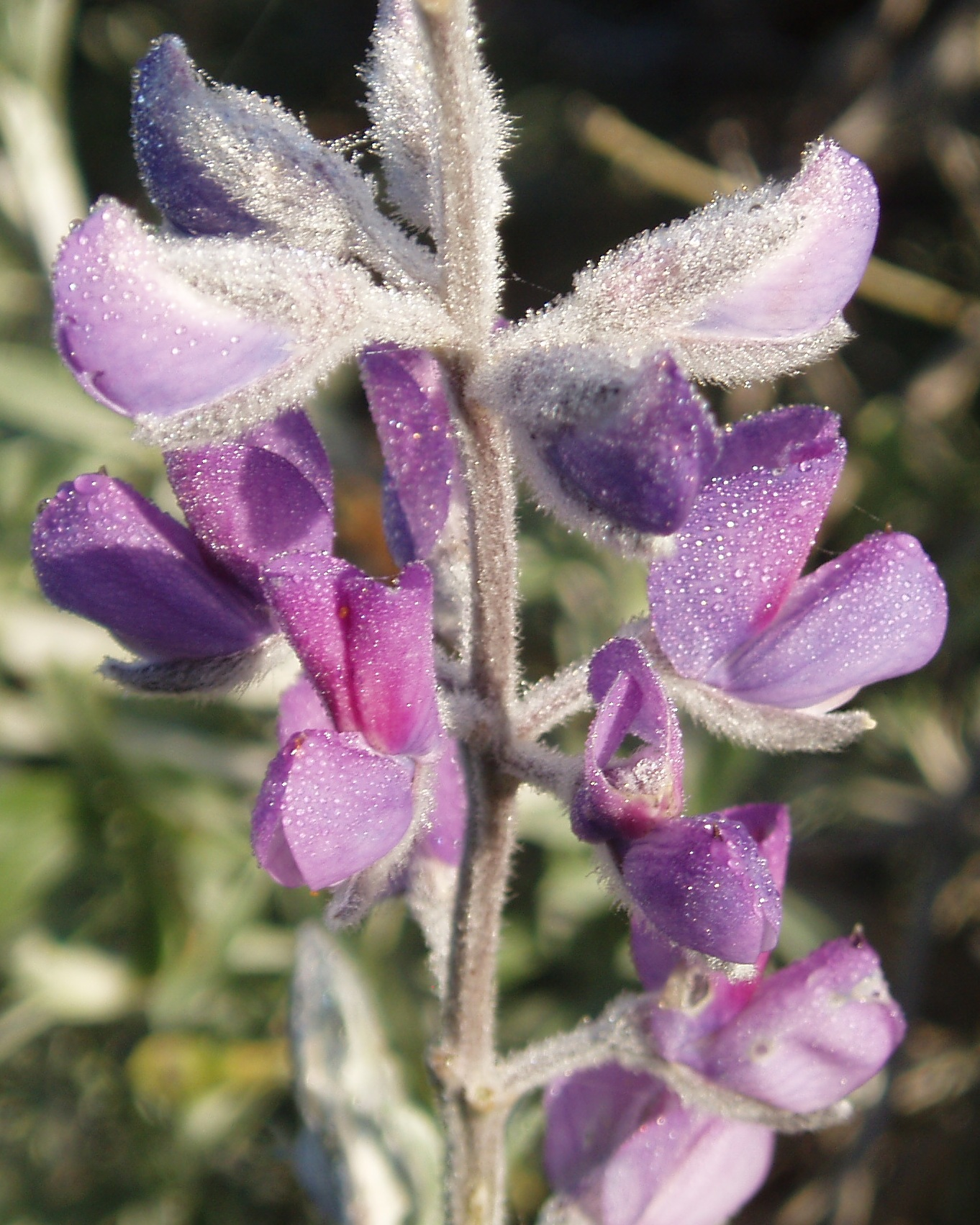

Scientific classification
- Kingdom: Plantae
- Clade: Tracheophytes
- Clade: Angiosperms
- Clade: Eudicots
- Clade: Rosids
- Order: Fabales
- Family: Fabaceae
- Subfamily: Faboideae
- Genus: Lupinus
- Species: L. chamissonis

Binomial name
- Lupinus chamissonis Eschsch.

= Lupinus chamissonis =

Species of legume

Lupinus chamissonis is a species of lupine known by the common name Chamisso bush lupine. It is endemic to California, where it is known from most of the length of the coastline. It grows in sand dunes and other immediate coastal habitat.

== Description ==
Lupinus chamissonis is a spreading, bushy shrub growing 1.5–2 metres (4 ft 11 in – 6 ft 7 in) tall. Each palmate leaf is made up of 5 to 9 leaflets up to 2.5 centimetres (0.98 in) long. The herbage is coated in silvery hairs.

The inflorescence bears whorls of flowers each about one to 1.5 centimetres (0.59 in) long. Each flower is light purple to blue with a yellow spot on its banner. The fruit is a hairy legume pod 2.5–3.5 centimetres (0.98–1.38 in) long.
