= Buffalo clover =

Buffalo clover may refer to:

- Buffalo clover, Alysicarpus vaginalis, a plant in the genus Alysicarpus
- Buffalo clover, Lupinus subcarnosus, a bluebonnet lupin
- Buffalo clover, Trifolium reflexum, a true clover
- Buffalo clover or running buffalo clover, Trifolium stoloniferum, a true clover
