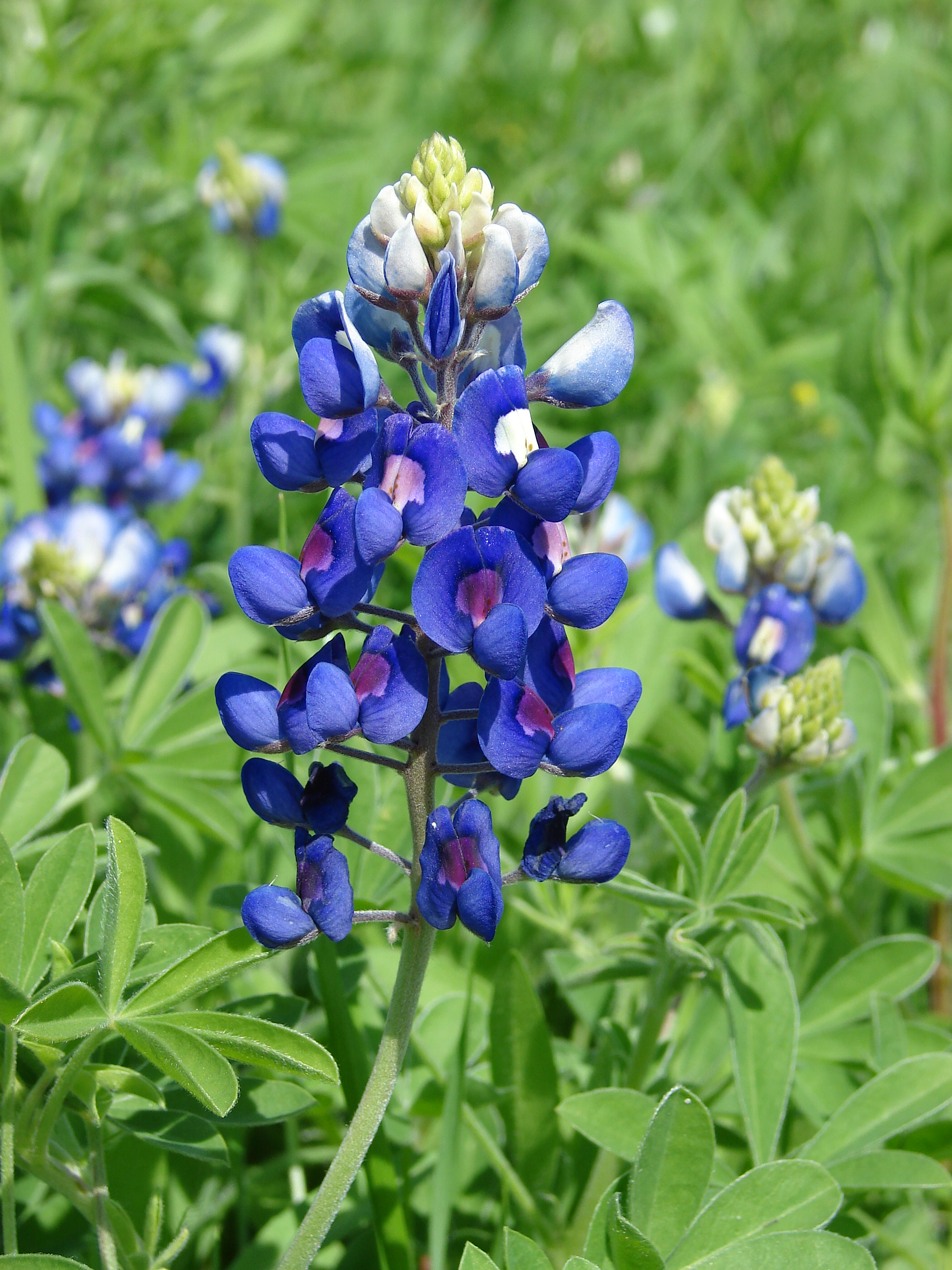

Scientific classification
- Kingdom: Plantae
- Clade: Tracheophytes
- Clade: Angiosperms
- Clade: Eudicots
- Clade: Rosids
- Order: Fabales
- Family: Fabaceae
- Subfamily: Faboideae
- Genus: Lupinus
- Species: L. texensis

Binomial name
- Lupinus texensis Hook.

= Lupinus texensis =

Species of lupine

Lupinus texensis, the Texas bluebonnet or Texas lupine is a species of lupine found in Texas, Louisiana, Arkansas and the Mexican states of Coahuila, Nuevo León, and Tamaulipas. With other related species of lupines also called bluebonnets, it is the state flower of Texas.

It is an annual which begins its life as a small, gravel-like seed. The seed has a hard seed coat that must be penetrated by wind, rain, and weather over the course of a few months (but sometimes several years). In the fall, the bluebonnets emerge as small seedlings with two cotyledons, and later a rosette of leaves that are palmately compound, with five to seven leaflets 3–10 cm long, green with a faint white edge and hair. Growth continues over the mild winter, and then in the spring takes off, rapidly grow larger, before sending up a 20– to 50-cm-tall plume of blue flowers (with bits of white and occasionally a tinge of pinkish-red). The scent of these blossoms has been diversely described; many people say they give off no scent at all, while a few have described the scent as 'sickly sweet'.

Bluebonnet seeds have a hard outer shell to protect from dry conditions as the plant grows better in moist years. Seeds may be scarified - a process to weaken the seed casing to encourage germination - before being stored. If scarified and stored at twenty-two degrees Celsius, the seeds face no reduction in germinability one year after being harvested and treated.

It has been found in the wild with isolated mutations in other colors, most notably all-white flowers, pink, and the maroon 'Alamo Fire' variation. These mutations have since been selectively bred to produce different color strains that are available commercially.

Texas recognizes all native lupine species occurring in the state as the official state flower. That fact leads to other species such as L. subcarnosus and L. havardii also being referred to as bluebonnets, but distinctions are seen among the species that differentiate them from L. texensis.

== Evolutionary History ==
Lupinus texensis' evolutionary roots go back to the emergence of the Lupinus genus in the Old World about 12-14 million years ago, followed by a later lineage of lupine species distributed across South America and parts of North America from 2.3-7.1 million years ago.
