= Alamo Fire =

Lupine cultivar

Lupinus texensis 'Alamo Fire'
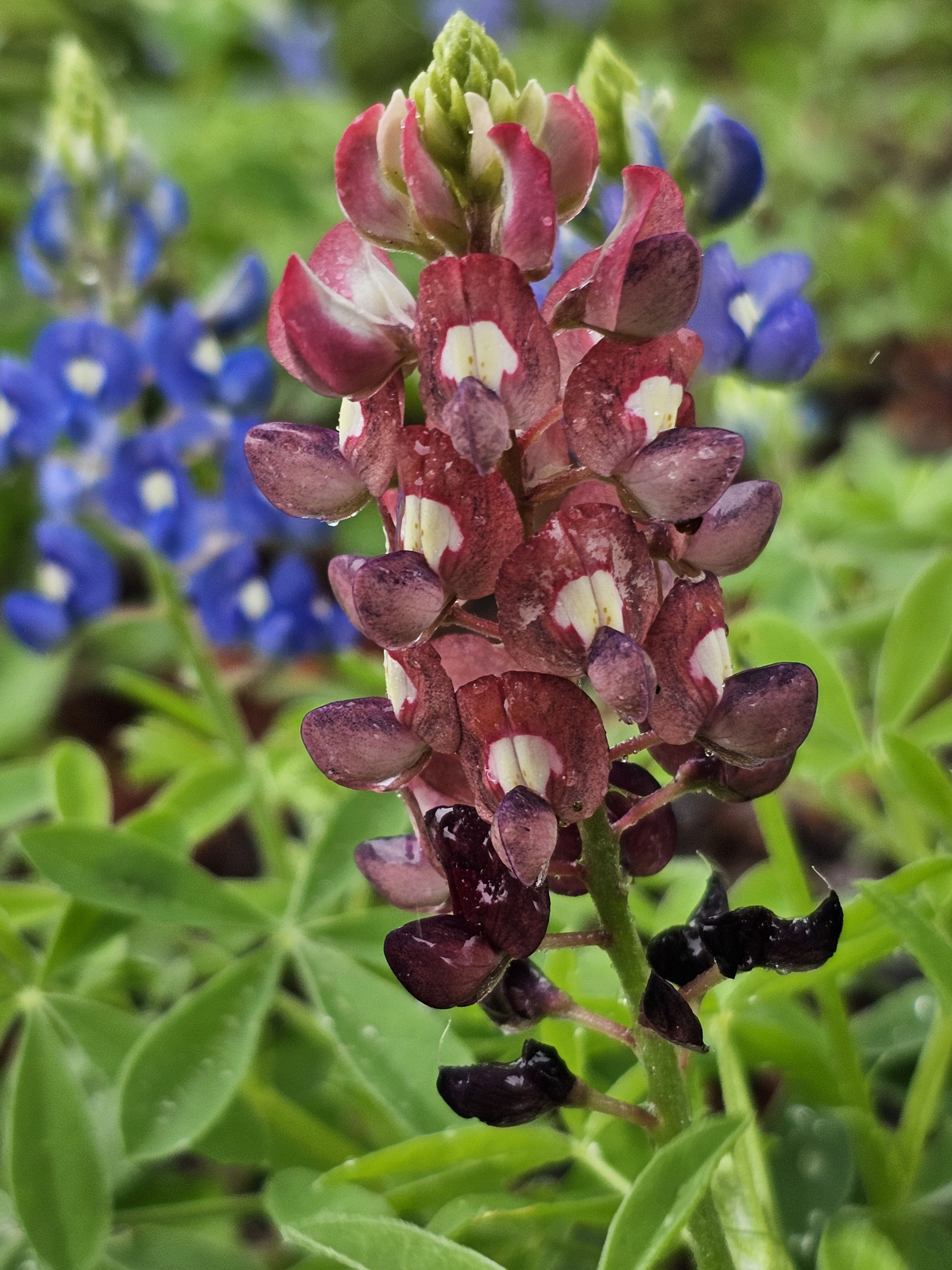
- Species: Lupinus texensis
- Cultivar: Alamo Fire
- Marketing names: Texas Maroon
- Breeder: Wildseed Farms, Dr. Jerry Parsons
- Origin: San Antonio, Texas

Alamo Fire or Texas Maroon are names given to a maroon hybrid cultivar of Lupinus texensis (or bluebonnet), Texas' state flower.

Maroon and white bluebonnets were developed as part of an effort to compose a Texas flag with red, white, and blue bluebonnets to celebrate the Texas sesquicentennial in 1986. Pink bluebonnets were found in San Antonio, and reddish examples were selectively bred by Dr. Jerry Parsons of the Texas A&M AgriLife Extension Service to eventually give maroon bluebonnets in 2000. The color of these bluebonnets was fitting, as the color maroon is strongly associated with Texas A&M University.

== Rarity ==
Alamo Fire bluebonnets are rarely found in nature because the genetic mutation that causes them is recessive.
