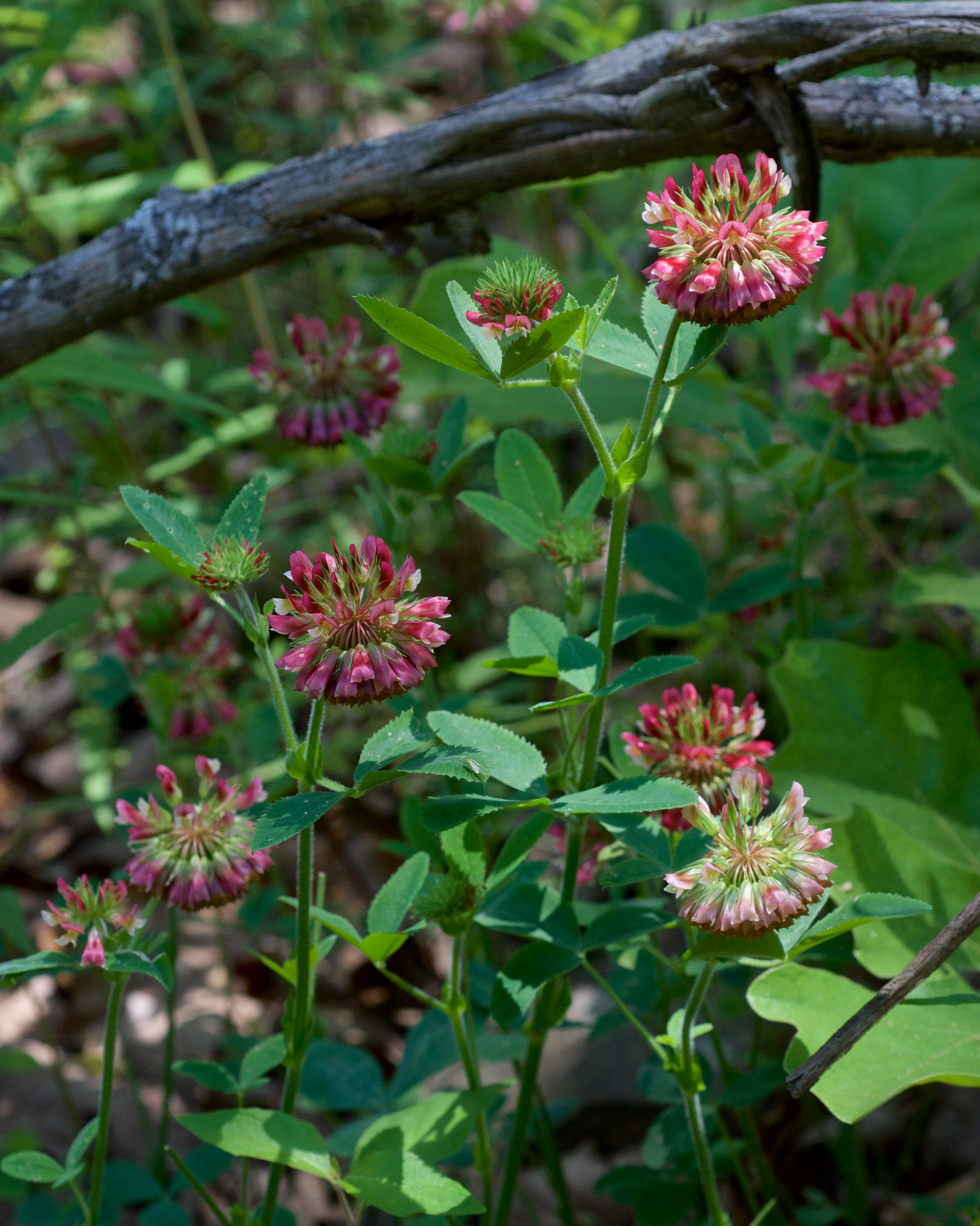

Conservation status
- Vulnerable (NatureServe)

Scientific classification
- Kingdom: Plantae
- Clade: Tracheophytes
- Clade: Angiosperms
- Clade: Eudicots
- Clade: Rosids
- Order: Fabales
- Family: Fabaceae
- Subfamily: Faboideae
- Genus: Trifolium
- Species: T. reflexum

Binomial name
- Trifolium reflexum L.

= Trifolium reflexum =

Species of legume

Trifolium reflexum, the buffalo clover, is a species of clover native to the Eastern United States. It is found in areas of natural openings including woodlands, glades, and prairies, often in acidic areas. It is an annual or biennial that produces white to dark pink flowers in the late spring.

Early in the European colonization of the Americas, clover species, likely including T. reflexum as well as related species such as T. stoloniferum, were recorded as forming a major component of the plant life in meadows and open woodlands, often in association with river cane, nettles, and other legumes.

Like many native clovers of the Eastern United States, Trifolium reflexum's populations have declined considerably in the past 200 years. For this species, fire suppression is indicated as a significant cause for decline. Controlled burns have been found to stimulate seed germination in T. reflexum.

== As host plant ==
Buffalo clover is a host plant for the caterpillars of the following butterfly species:

- Colias philodice
- Colias eurytheme
- Everes comyntas
- Strymon melinus
- Thorybes pylades

== Gallery ==
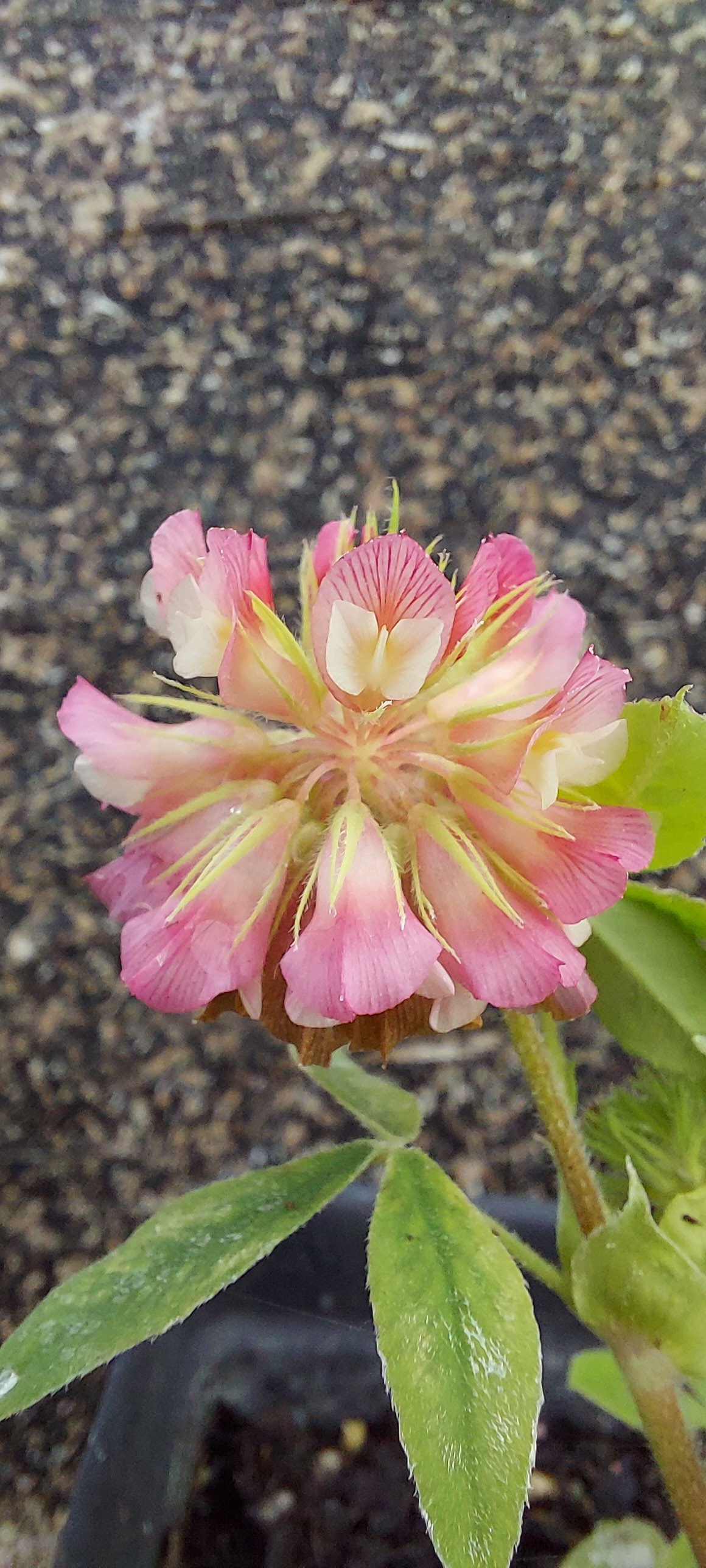
Trifolium reflexum - Close-up of flowers

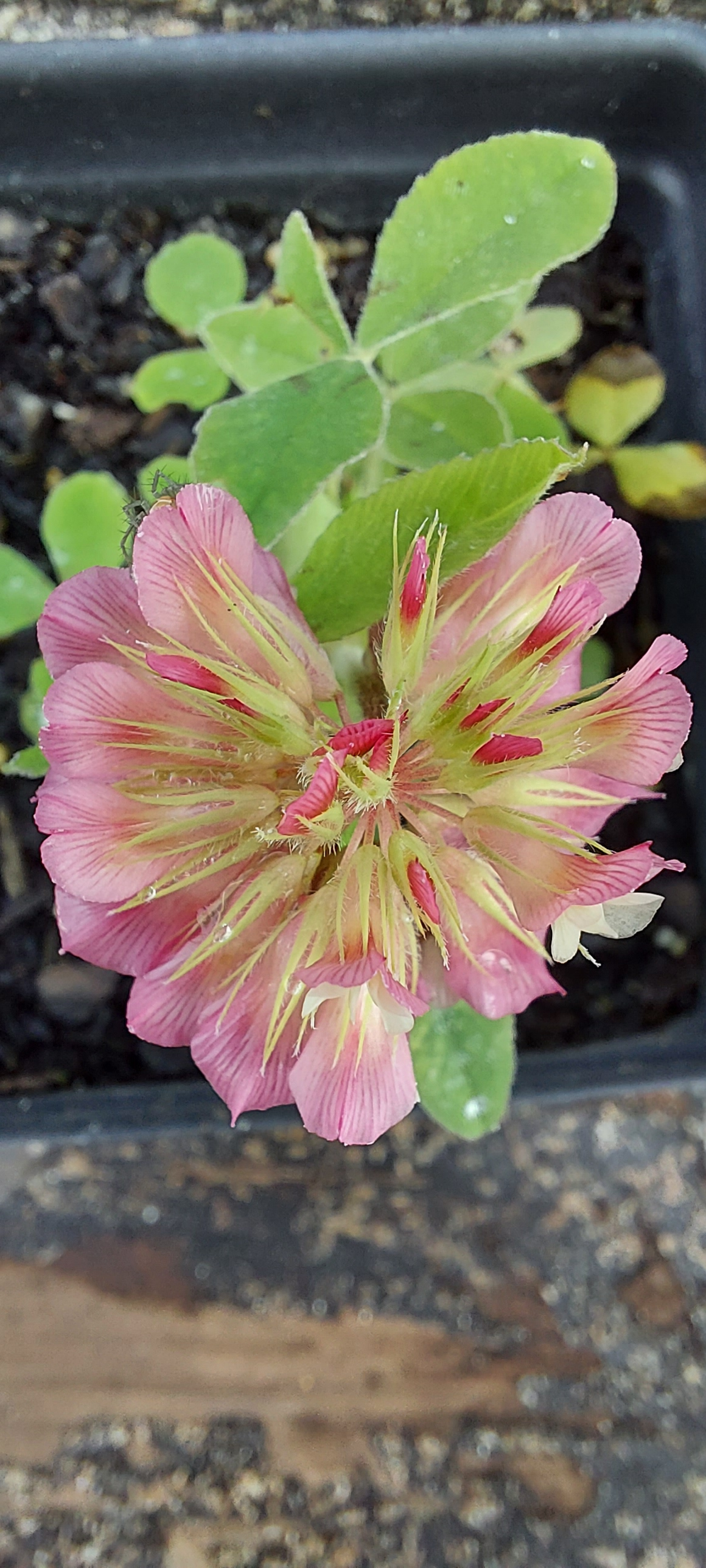
Top of flower

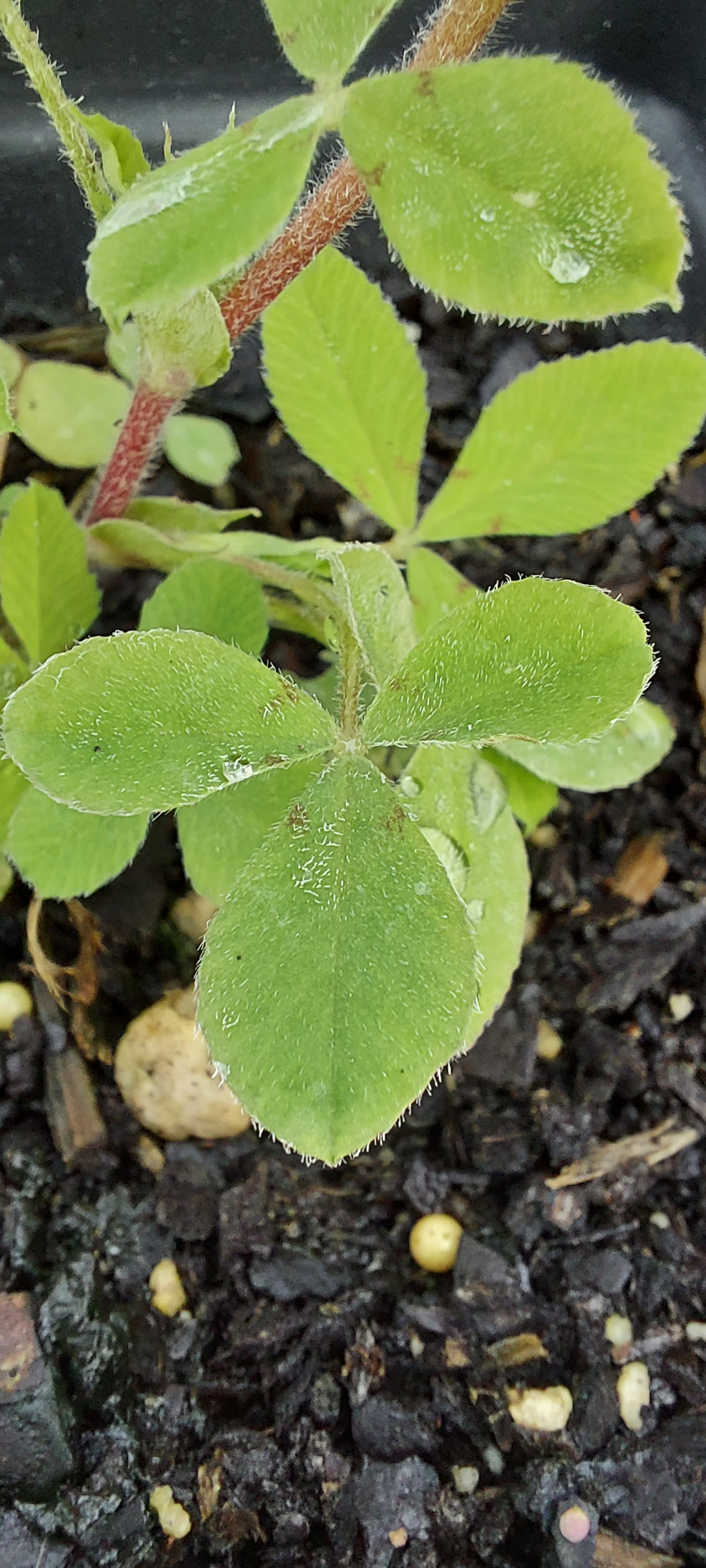
Adaxial side of leaf, showing chevrons and slight pubescence

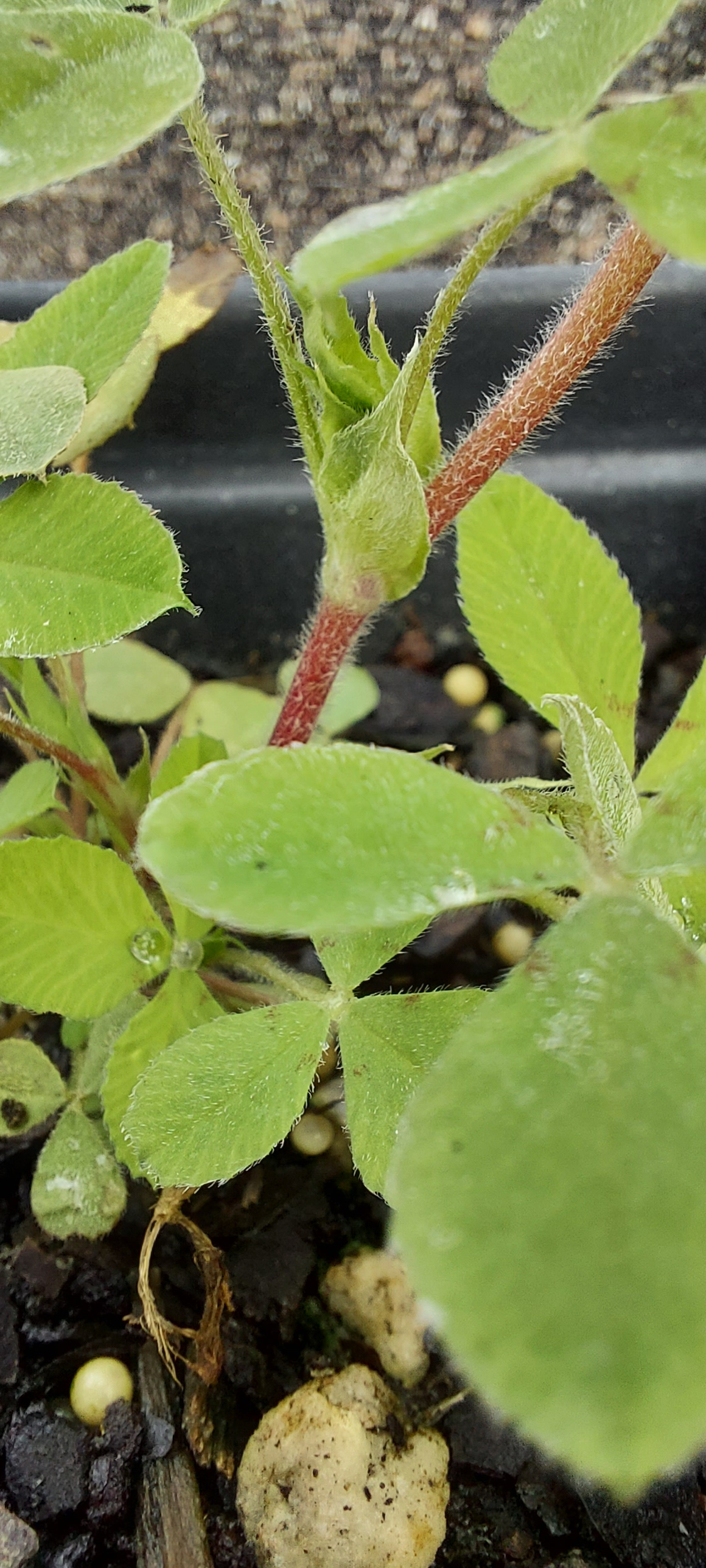
Pubescent stem, stipule, and petioles
