= Bluebonnet (plant) =

Flowering plant of the genus Lupinus

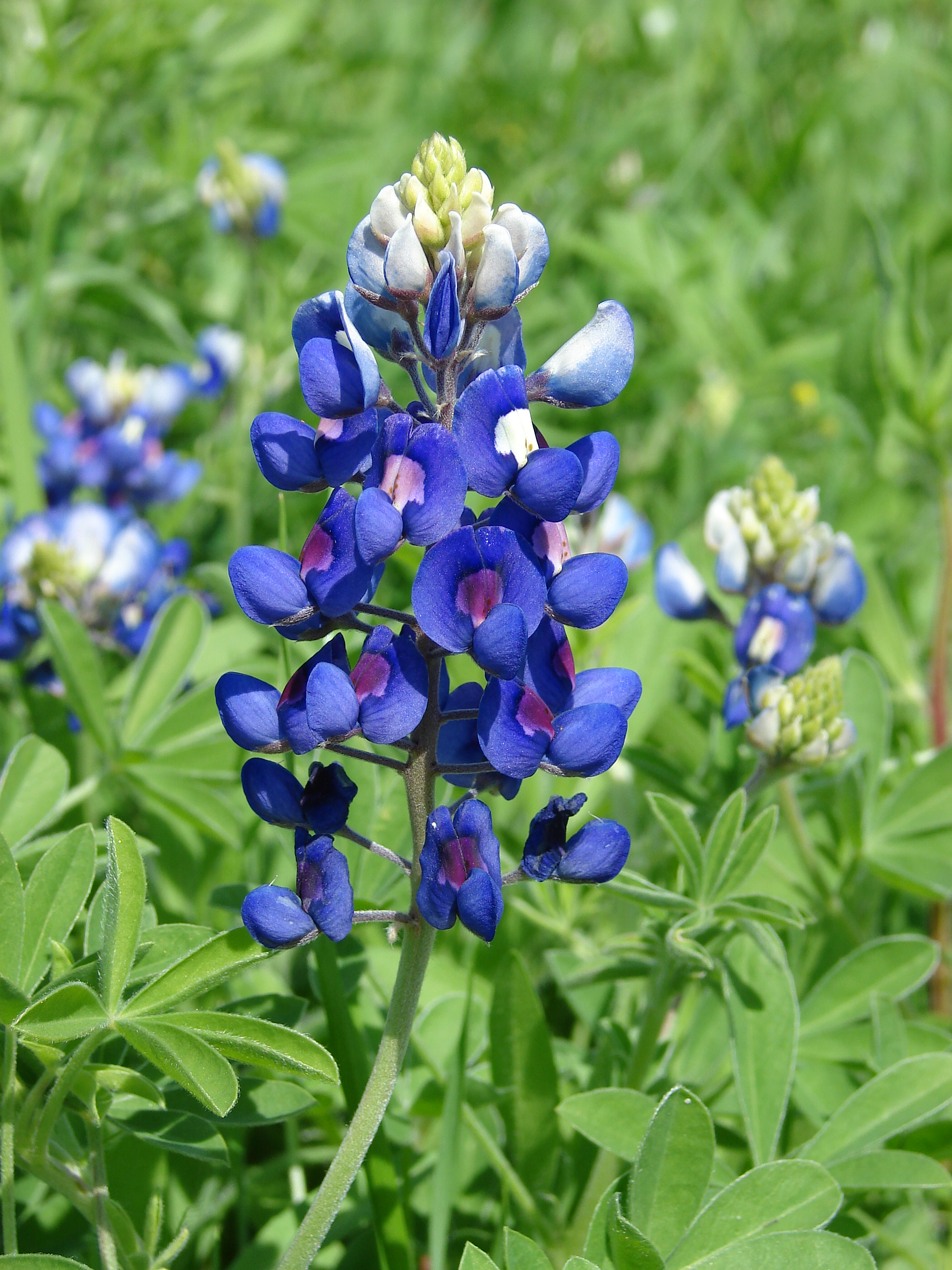
Bluebonnet, Texas

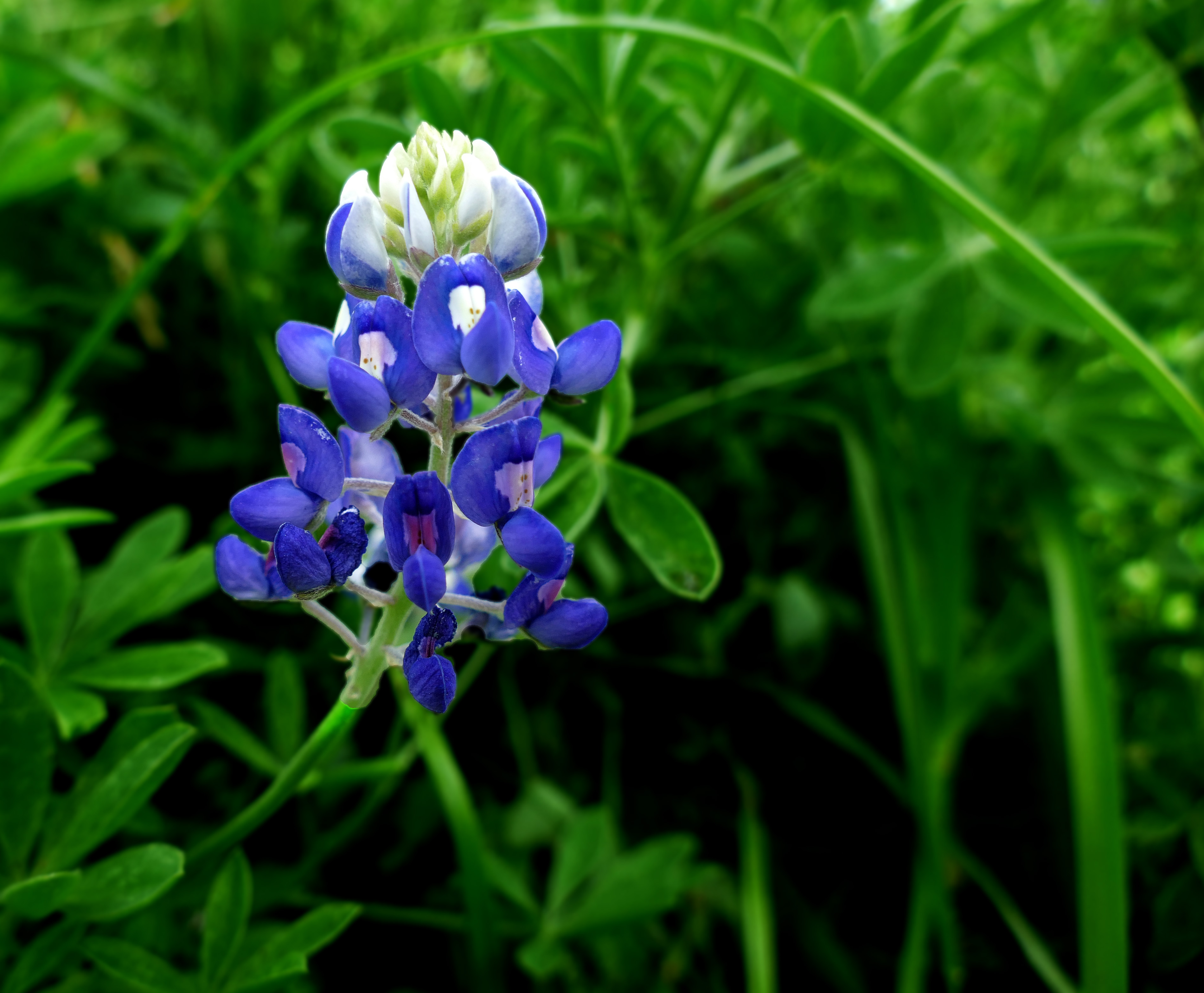
Texas bluebonnet -- Lupinus

Bluebonnet is a name given to any of a number of purple-flowered or blue-flowered species of the genus Lupinus and is collectively the state flower of Texas. The shape of the petals on the flower resembles the bonnet worn by pioneer women to shield them from the sun. Species often called bluebonnets include:

- Lupinus argenteus, silvery lupine
- Lupinus concinnus, Bajada lupine
- Lupinus havardii, Big Bend bluebonnet or Chisos bluebonnet
- Lupinus perennis, wild lupine or blue lupine
- Lupinus plattensis, Nebraska lupine
- Lupinus subcarnosus, sandyland bluebonnet or buffalo clover
- Lupinus texensis, Texas bluebonnet or Texas lupine

On March 7, 1901, Lupinus subcarnosus became the only species of bluebonnet recognized as the state flower of Texas; however, Lupinus texensis emerged as the favorite of most Texans. So, in 1971, the Texas Legislature made any similar species of Lupinus that could be found in Texas the state flower. Despite the common belief among Texans that picking bluebonnets is illegal in the state, this is a myth, and there are no laws that specifically prohibit picking them.

As an extension of Lady Bird Johnson's efforts at highway beautification in the United States (see Highway Beautification Act), she encouraged the planting of native plants along Texas highways after she left the White House. Bluebonnet blooms are now a common sight along these highways in the springtime. They serve as a popular backdrop for family photographs, and the Department of Public Safety issues safety recommendations with regard to drivers pulling off highways to take such pictures.

== Bluebonnets in media ==
=== Books ===
- 1983: The Legend of the Bluebonnet, by Tomie dePaola

=== College football ===
- The Bluebonnet Bowl was an annual college football postseason bowl game in Texas, played in Houston in late December from 1959 through 1987.
- The Baylor–TCU football rivalry is known as The Bluebonnet Battle

=== Music ===
- 2016: Bluebonnets (Julia's Song), by Aaron Watson
