= Valery Havard =

American army officer, physician (1846–1927)

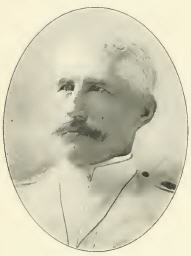
- Valery Havard
- Born: February 18, 1846; Compiegne, France
- Died: November 6, 1927 (aged 81) mid-Atlantic Ocean
- Military career
- Allegiance: United States of America
- Branch: United States Army
- Service years: 1871-1910, 1917-1923
- Rank: Colonel
- Conflicts: Spanish–American War; Russo-Japanese War (military attaché); World War I
- Other work: physician, author, and botanist

Valery Havard (February 18, 1846 – November 6, 1927), was a career army officer, physician, author, and botanist. Although he held many notable posts during his military career, he is most well known for his service on the western frontier of the United States and in Cuba. Many Texas plants are named for Havard, including the Chisos bluebonnet (Lupinus havardii), Havard oak (Quercus havardii), and Havard's evening primrose (Oenothera havardii).

== Biography ==
=== Early life ===
Havard was born in Compiegne, France. After graduating from the Institute of Beauvais, he studied medicine in Paris before immigrating to the United States. He entered Manhattan College and the medical department of New York University, in New York City, graduating from both in 1869. For a time thereafter, he was house physician in Children's Hospital and professor of French, chemistry, and botany at Manhattan College.

=== Frontier posts ===
In 1871, he was appointed an acting assistant surgeon in the army and was commissioned an assistant surgeon in the medical corps three years later. For six months in 1877, he served with the 7th Cavalry in Montana in pursuit of hostile Sioux and Nez Perce Indians. In 1880, he joined the 1st Infantry then engaged in opening roads in the Pecos River Valley in West Texas. In the summer of 1881, he accompanied an exploring expedition into northwest Texas, headed by Captain William R. Livermore, Corps of Engineers. From stations at Fort Duncan and San Antonio, he again went with exploring parties under Captain Livermore to the upper Rio Grande Valley during the summers of 1883 and 1884. While on frontier duty, he became interested in economic botany and studied the food and drink plants of the Indians, Mexicans, and early settlers.

Havard served in various posts from 1884 to 1898, including service in New York (Fort Schuyler, Fort Wadsworth, and the recruiting depot at Davids Island), North Dakota (Fort Lincoln and Fort Buford), and Wyoming (Fort D. A. Russell).

=== Spanish–American War ===
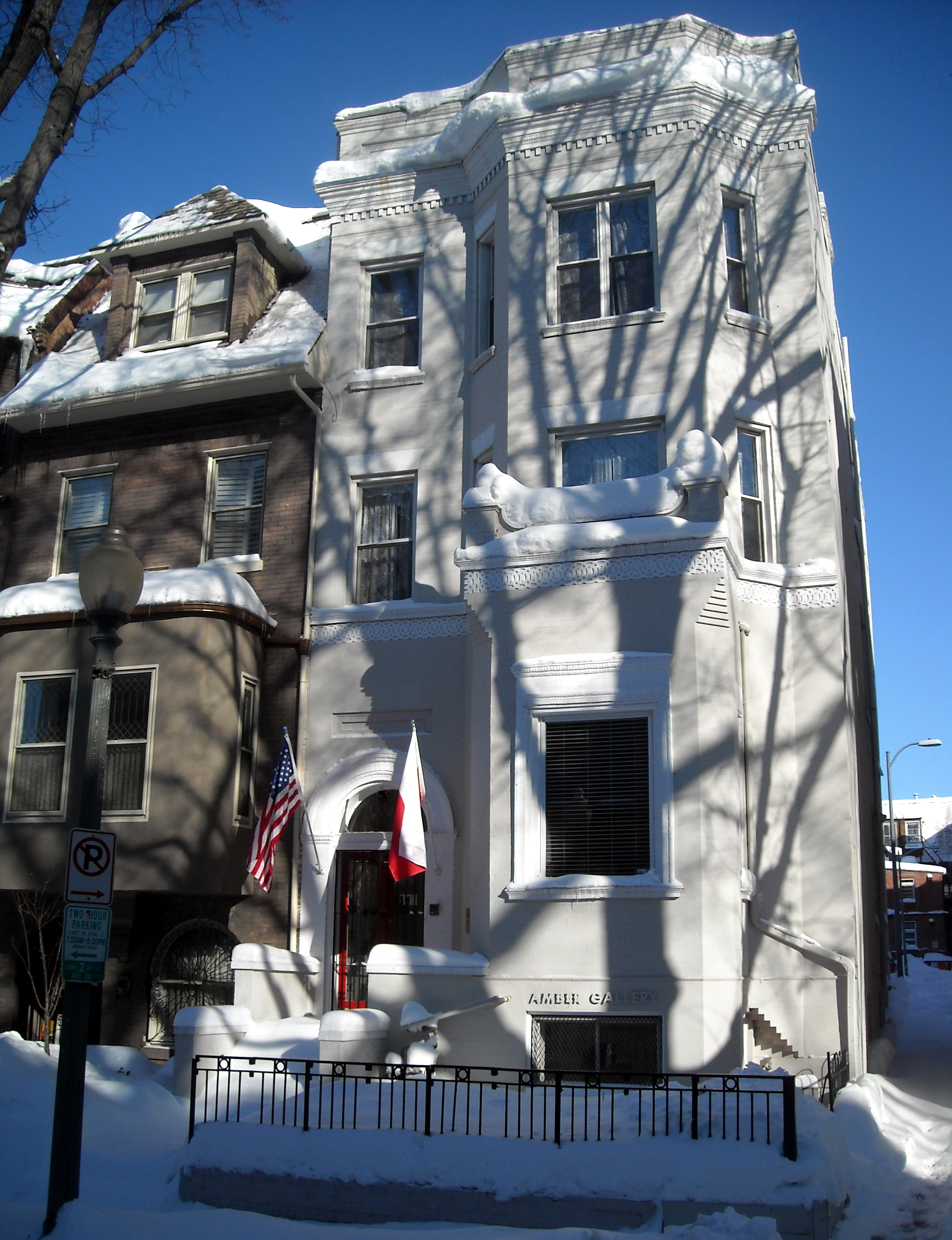
Havard's former house in the Dupont Circle neighborhood of Washington, DC

With the outbreak of the Spanish–American War in 1898, Havard was assigned as chief surgeon of the Cavalry Division, and accompanied the division to Siboney, Cuba. He served in the field during the Battle of San Juan Hill on July 1. After the war, he joined the staff of General Leonard Wood in Havana as chief surgeon of the Division of Cuba and continued with Wood when he became military governor. While in Havana in October 1900, he was the subject of a severe attack of yellow fever.

=== Russo-Japanese War ===
With the establishment of civil government in Cuba, Colonel Havard returned to the United States for duty in Virginia (Fort Monroe) and New York (West Point and Department of the East at Governors Island). In 1904, he was detailed to the Imperial Russian Army as among the medical military attachés and observers in the Russo-Japanese War. Havard arrived in St. Petersburg on December 7, 1904, and reached the frontlines in Manchuria on February 8, 1905. After being embedded with Russian forces just over a month, Havard was captured by the Imperial Japanese Army at the Battle of Mukden. Upon reaching Tokyo, he was sent back to the United States.

In his official report, Havard compiled a list of lessons learned from the Russo-Japanese experience. He noted the lack of frontal assaults that were the result of improved weaponry, particularly the machine gun. Flanking movements became more necessary to avoid the machine gun, which necessitated increased frequency and distance of forced marches. In previous wars, soldiers were able to rest at night and armies saw little action during winter months. Both practices had become antiquated. Attacks were often ordered at night and the waging of war never ceased, even in subzero temperatures. According to Havard, the result of these trends was soldiers experiencing an increased level of battle fatigue, as well as resurgence in the usefulness of the bayonet in night assaults. The Japanese claimed seven percent of their casualties resulted from bayonet wounds.

Because of his observations in Manchuria, Havard recommended changes to the U.S. Army's Medical Corps. He suggested the war department devise a plan to train and mobilize large numbers of medical personnel for war and to promote the development of civilian organizations such as the Red Cross. Because of the increased number of casualties resulting from modern weaponry, Havard stressed the significance of training enlisted soldiers in assisting medical officers in field hospitals. He also spoke to the importance of devising an adequate evacuation system from the battlefield to military hospitals. He explained that railroads were of importance in this process. Havard also advocated the implementation of telephone technology for hospital staff to have quick access to information from the battle.

He was subsequently elected to a term as president of the Association of Military Surgeons. In 1906, he was appointed president of the faculty of the Army Medical School, which he held until he retired from military duty in 1910. Upon retirement, Havard established his home in Fairfield, Connecticut. There, he continued a career of writing begun when he entered the army.

=== World War I ===
With the onset of World War I, Colonel Havard was called from retirement for duty with the Cuban government in the reorganization of the medical departments of its army and navy (1917–1923), for which he received the Cuban Order of Military Merit. In his 81st year, he died on board the steamship Columbo while returning from a visit to France.

== Writings ==
Havard's early articles were on botany and military hygiene, continued with reports on observations on the Spanish-American and Russo-Japanese Wars. While at Fort Lincoln in 1889, Havard published a "Manual of Drill for the Hospital Corps". He won the Enno Sander prize given by the Association of Military Surgeons in 1901 with an essay on "The Most Practicable Organization for the Medical Department of the United States Army in Active Service". Pamphlets on "Transmission of Yellow Fever" (1902) and "The Venereal Peril" (1903) were issued as government publications. During his last service in Washington, he published his "Manual of Military Hygiene" (1909), with second and third editions (1914 and 1917) prepared at Fairfield. At time of publication this was the best work on military hygiene yet produced in this country.

Havard's article "The French Half-breeds of the Northwest" was published in the Annual Report of the Smithsonian Institution (1879). He published a number of articles on the flora of Montana, North Dakota, Texas, and Colorado, including "Botanical Outlines" in Report of the Chief of Engineers, Part III (1878), and "Report on the Flora of Western and Southern Texas" in Proceedings of the United States National Museum (1885). Havard's "Notes on Trees of Cuba" was published in The Plant World, IV (1901).
