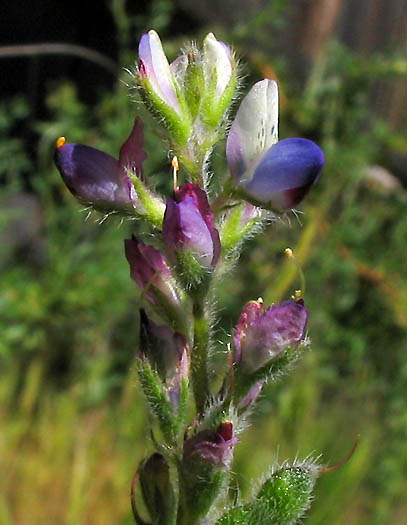

Scientific classification
- Kingdom: Plantae
- Clade: Tracheophytes
- Clade: Angiosperms
- Clade: Eudicots
- Clade: Rosids
- Order: Fabales
- Family: Fabaceae
- Subfamily: Faboideae
- Genus: Lupinus
- Species: L. concinnus

Binomial name
- Lupinus concinnus J.Agardh

= Lupinus concinnus =

Species of legume

Lupinus concinnus is a species of lupine known by the common name Bajada lupine. It is native to the southwestern United States from California to Texas, and northern Mexico, where it is known from many types of habitat. This is a hairy erect or decumbent annual herb with a stem growing 10 to 30 centimeters long. Each small palmate leaf is made up of 5 to 9 leaflets up to 3 centimeters long and under a centimeter wide, sometimes narrow and linear in shape. The inflorescence is a dense spiral of flowers, with some flowers also appearing in leaf axils lower on the plant. Each flower is 5 to 12 millimeters long and purple, pink, or nearly white in color. The fruit is a hairy legume pod around a centimeter long.
