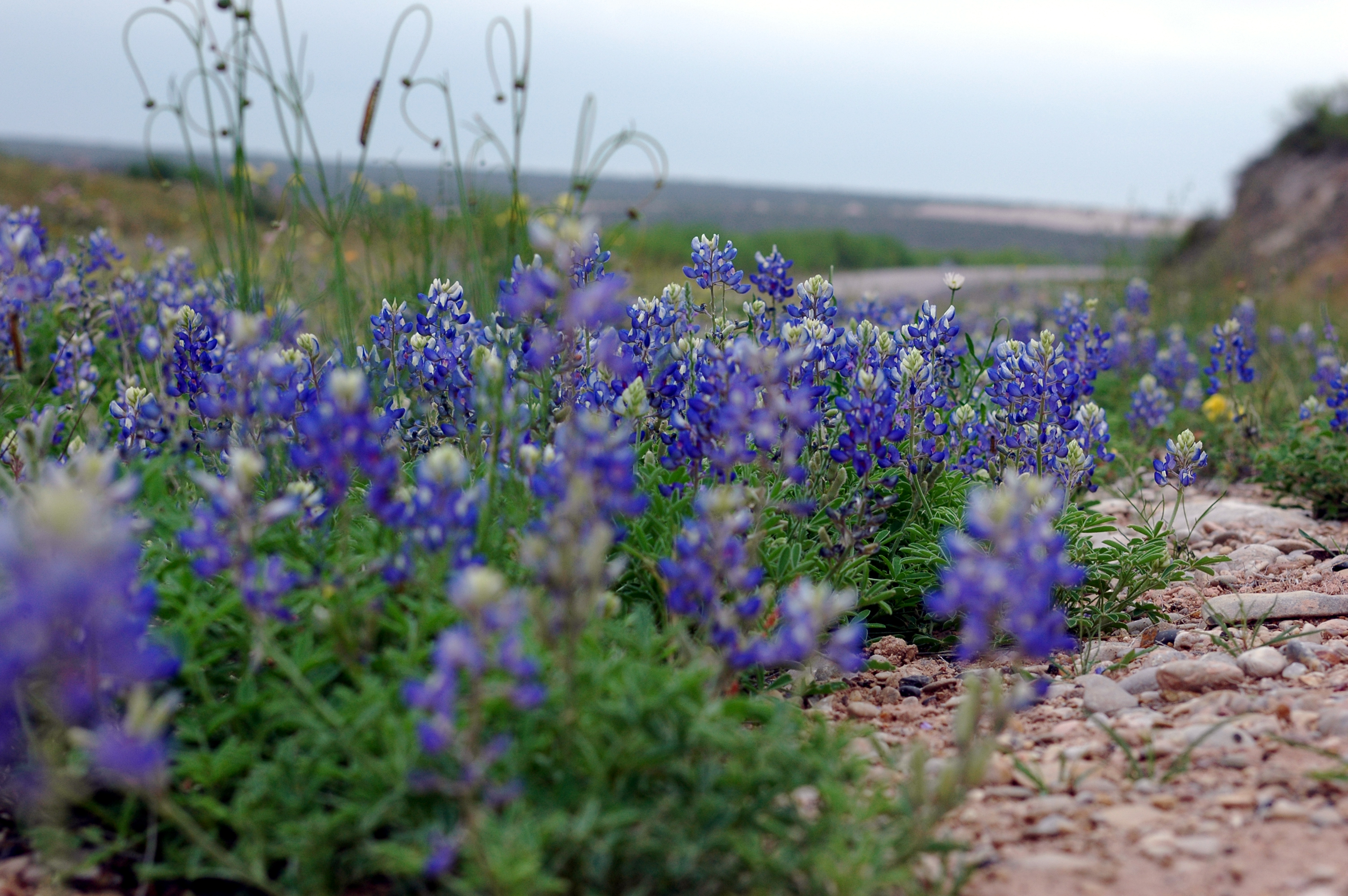
- On a roadside in Texas
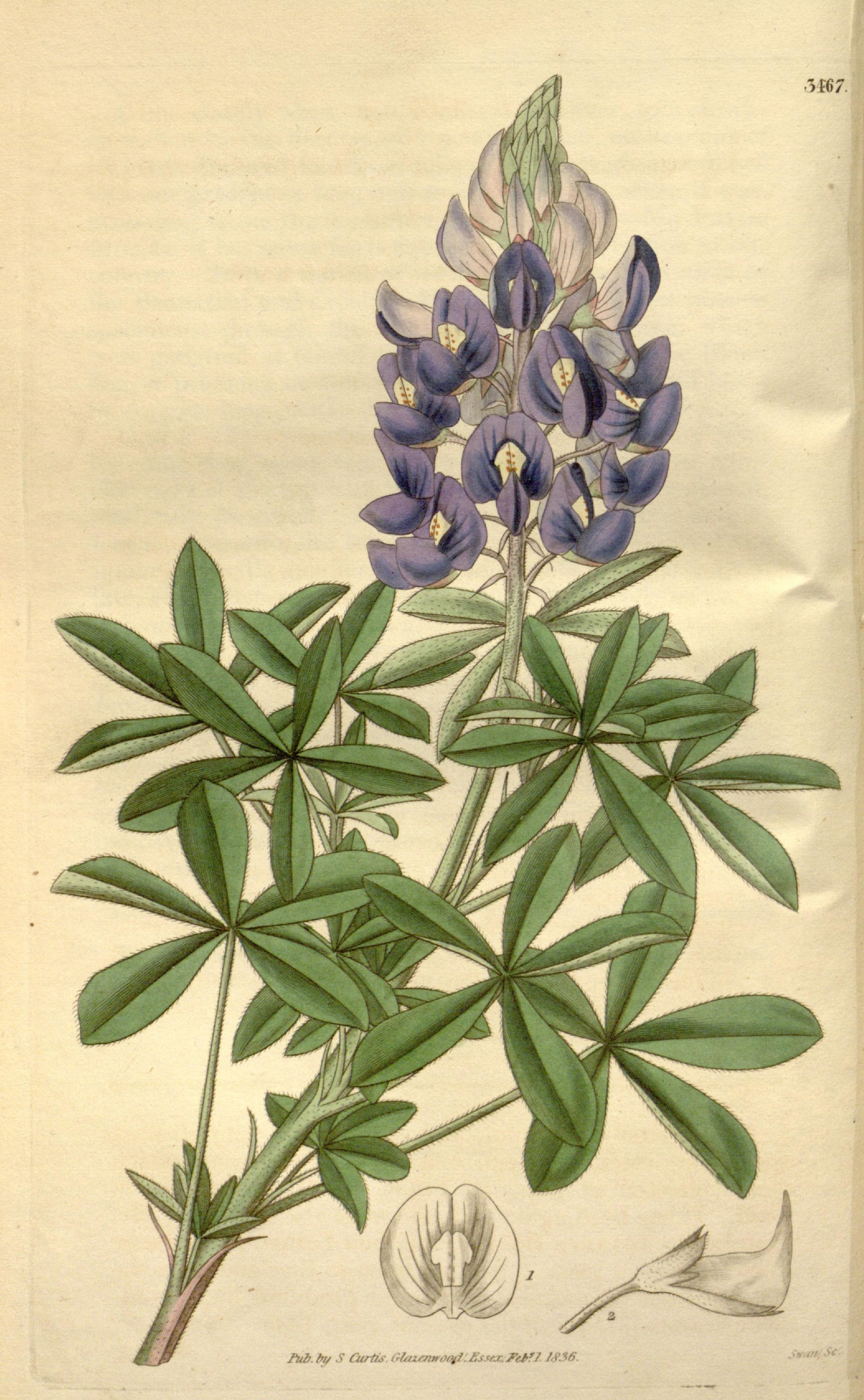
- Botanical illustration

Scientific classification
- Kingdom: Plantae
- Clade: Tracheophytes
- Clade: Angiosperms
- Clade: Eudicots
- Clade: Rosids
- Order: Fabales
- Family: Fabaceae
- Subfamily: Faboideae
- Genus: Lupinus
- Species: L. subcarnosus

Binomial name
- Lupinus subcarnosus Hook.

Synonyms
- Lupinus bimaculatus Hook. ex D.Don; Lupinus perennis var. austrinus Shinners

= Lupinus subcarnosus =

Species of plant

Lupinus subcarnosus, the sandy land bluebonnet or Texas bluebonnet, is a species of flowering plant in the family Fabaceae. It is native to southeastern Texas and northeastern Mexico. A winter annual reaching 40 cm (16 in), it prefers deep sandy soils. With other related species of lupines also called bluebonnets, it is the state flower of Texas.
