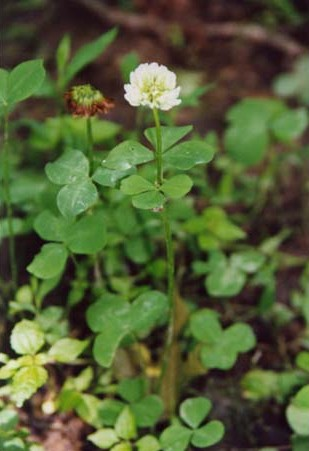

Conservation status
- Vulnerable (NatureServe)

Scientific classification
- Kingdom: Plantae
- Clade: Tracheophytes
- Clade: Angiosperms
- Clade: Eudicots
- Clade: Rosids
- Order: Fabales
- Family: Fabaceae
- Subfamily: Faboideae
- Genus: Trifolium
- Species: T. stoloniferum

Binomial name
- Trifolium stoloniferum Muhl. ex A. Eaton

= Trifolium stoloniferum =

Species of legume

Trifolium stoloniferum, the running buffalo clover, is an endangered species of perennial clover native to the eastern and midwestern United States.

== Description ==
This plant has erect, unbranched flowering stems, typically 10–50 centimeters (4–20 in) tall. The apex of the stem is topped by a round flower head, subtended by two leaves. These apical leaves are typically larger than those found on stems without flowers. The flower heads are white, sometimes tinged with purple, and 2–2.5 cm diameter.

Like other clovers, running buffalo clover has leaves divided into three leaflets. It sends out long creeping runners (stolons) from its base, which grow along the ground and take root. The stems and leaves are hairless. It flowers from mid-May to June and fruits in July.

== Distribution and habitat ==
The original habitat of this plant is believed to be areas of rich soils in open areas among forests and prairies. Grazing bison probably maintained these open areas while migrating along established trails. Running buffalo clover has current populations in West Virginia, Ohio, Kentucky, Indiana, Pennsylvania and Missouri. There are also historical reports from Illinois, Kansas, and Arkansas.

Remaining running buffalo clover populations are generally small and sporadically located. It is most often rediscovered in lightly shaded woodlands along streams, but some have also been found in lawns of old home sites and cemeteries.

From 1940 to 1983 it was believed to be extinct until two populations were discovered in West Virginia. Since then, more populations have been found in the US but it still remains one of the most imperiled plants in North America.

== Threats ==
Historical records show that running buffalo clover was once abundant in certain parts of its range, but it rapidly disappeared upon pioneer settlement. The reasons for this plant's decline are not known entirely, but they are believed to be directly related to the disappearance of large herbivores from the plant's habitat. This species appears to have been dependent upon the woodland disturbance created by large animals, especially the bison. Many of the species' old records were in proximity to bison licks and trails. Other causes may include competition from introduced species and habitat loss.

Running buffalo clover is also the only known species of Trifolium that has no apparent rhizobial association. Rhizobia typically nodulate the roots of Trifolium, increasing nitrogen availability to the plant. It is unknown whether T. stoloniferum has lost the ability to associate with rhizobia due to the high nitrogen environment associated with bison, or if the rhizobial associate is extinct due to either the decline of the clover or from competition with rhizobia that was introduced with exotic clovers.
