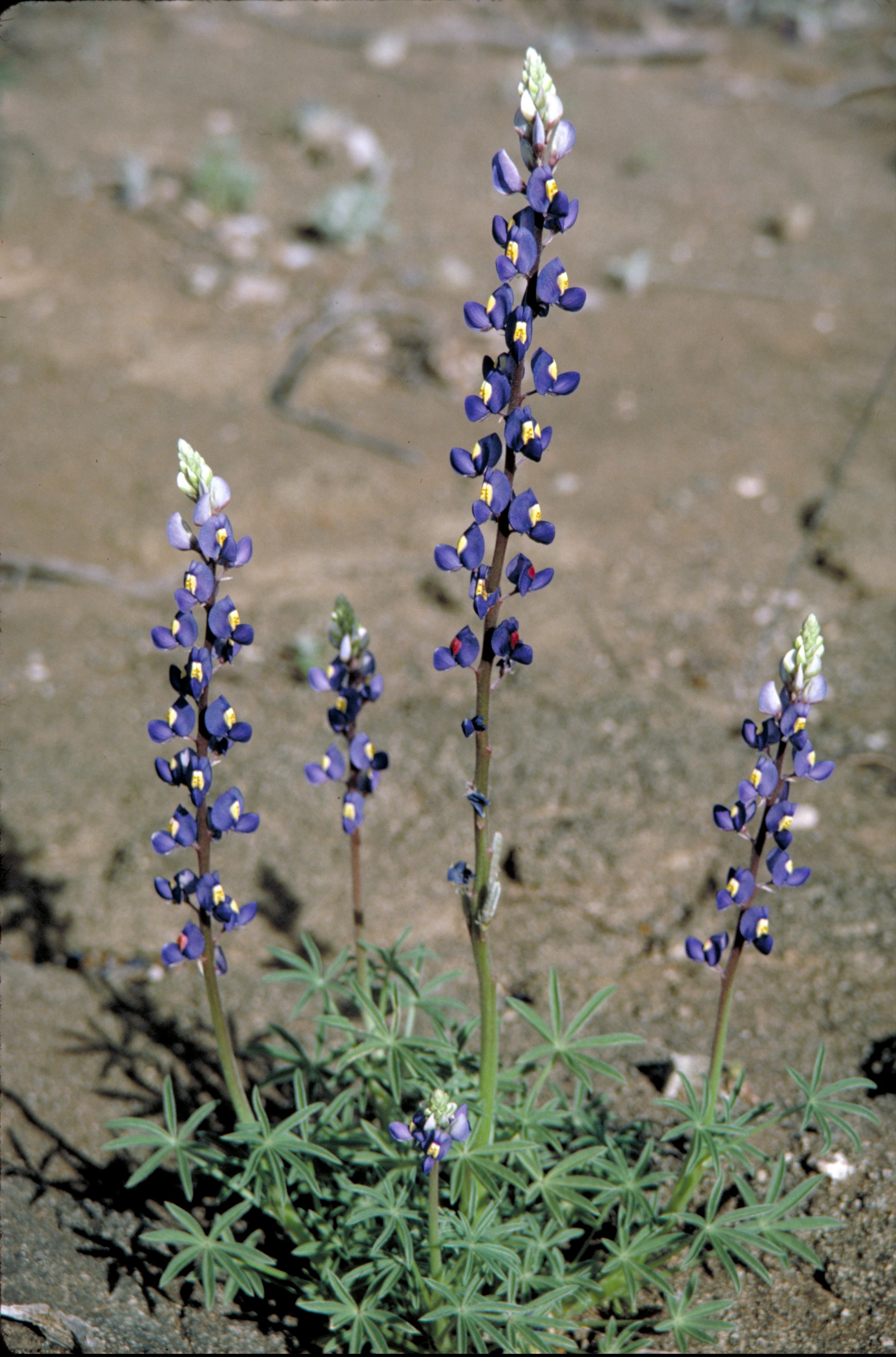

Scientific classification
- Kingdom: Plantae
- Clade: Tracheophytes
- Clade: Angiosperms
- Clade: Eudicots
- Clade: Rosids
- Order: Fabales
- Family: Fabaceae
- Subfamily: Faboideae
- Genus: Lupinus
- Species: L. havardii

Binomial name
- Lupinus havardii S.Wats.

= Lupinus havardii =

Species of legume

Lupinus havardii is a species of lupine known by the common names Big Bend bluebonnet and Chisos bluebonnet. It is native to Texas and Chihuahua, where it blooms between January and June. Its habitat includes gravelly, fine talus, and the alluvial soils in the desert, valleys, hills, and mountain slopes.

It is an erect annual herb with a slender, branching stem which can reach over 4 ft in height. The height of the flower and plant is dependent on available soil moisture and can be as short as a few inches and as tall as the current record at 5 ft 4in. The flower is about half an inch long and purple to blue in color. The spot on its banner is white to yellow turning red once the flower is no longer fertile. This color change makes the flower less visible to bees so they continue on to more fertile flowers. The palmate leaves are each made up of about seven leaflets. In the wild, white and even pink blooming plants are very rarely observed. These rare colors have been isolated and propagated by horticulturalists at Texas A&M University, and along with the blue flowers are available as a premium cut flower.

The Big Bend bluebonnet's specific epithet honors surgeon and botanist Valery Havard.

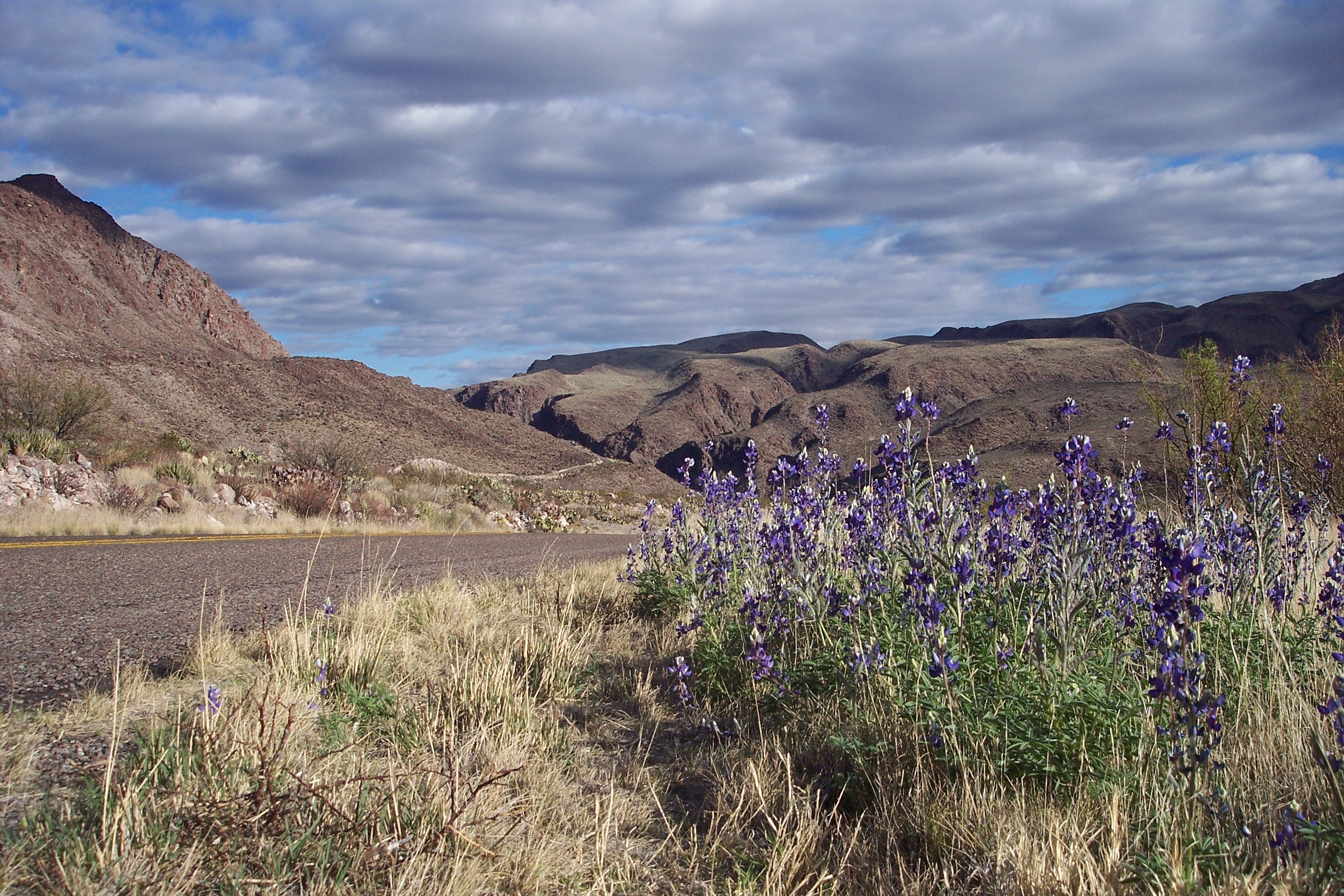
Bluebonnets in Big Bend National Park

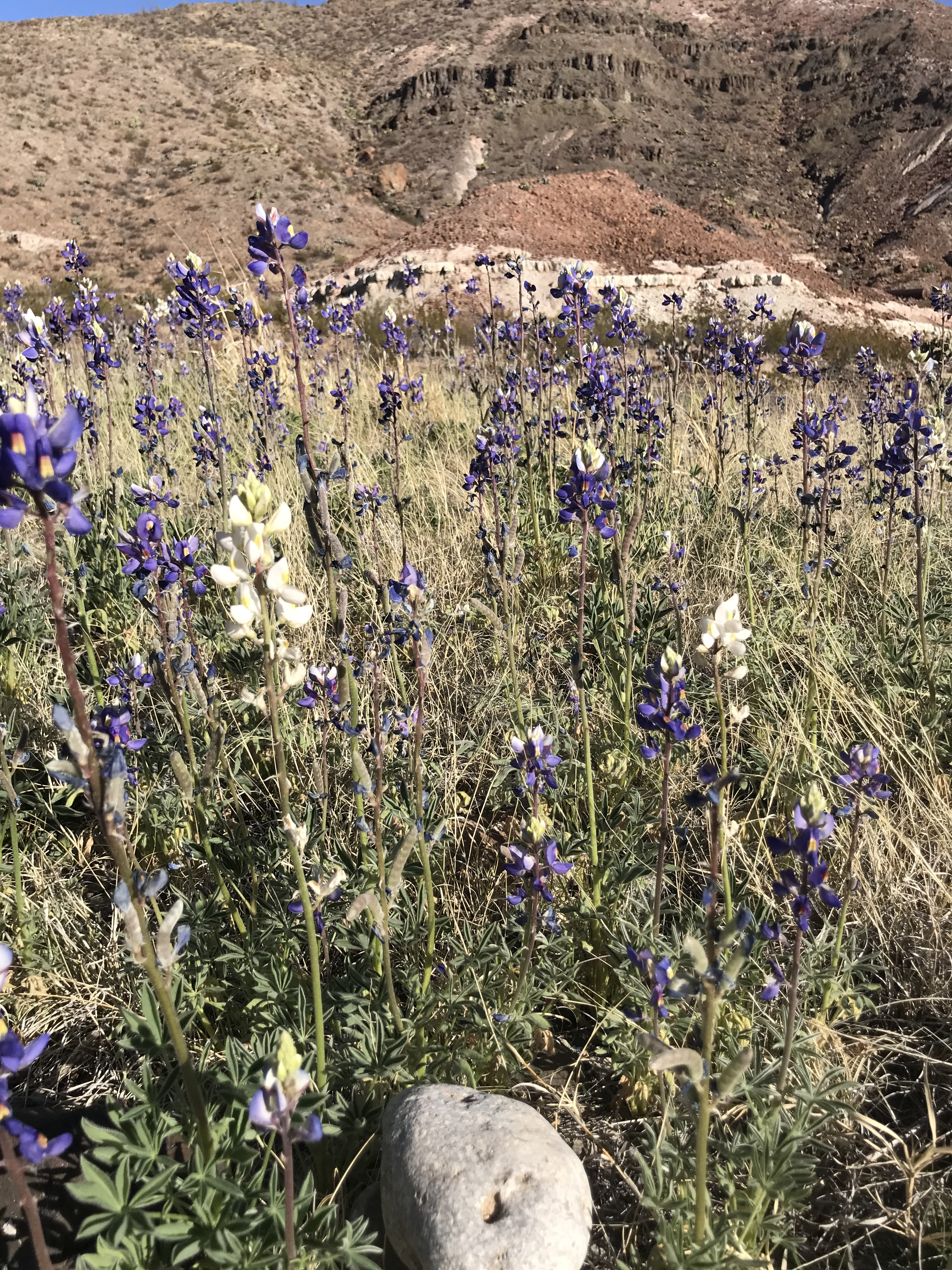
White and blue Big Bend Bluebonnets in the wild, Presidio County, Texas.

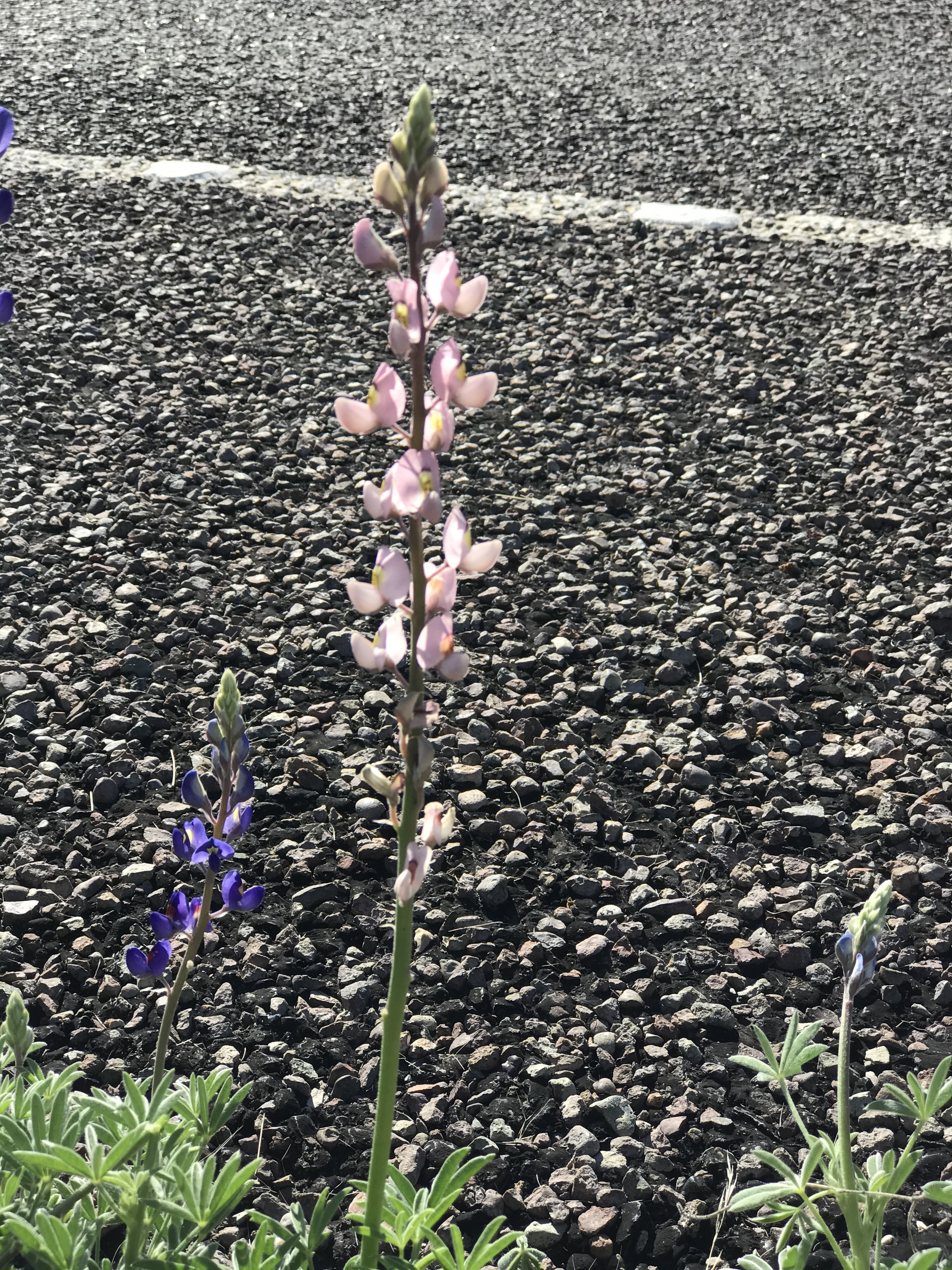
Pink Big Bend Bluebonnet in the wild, Presidio County, Texas.

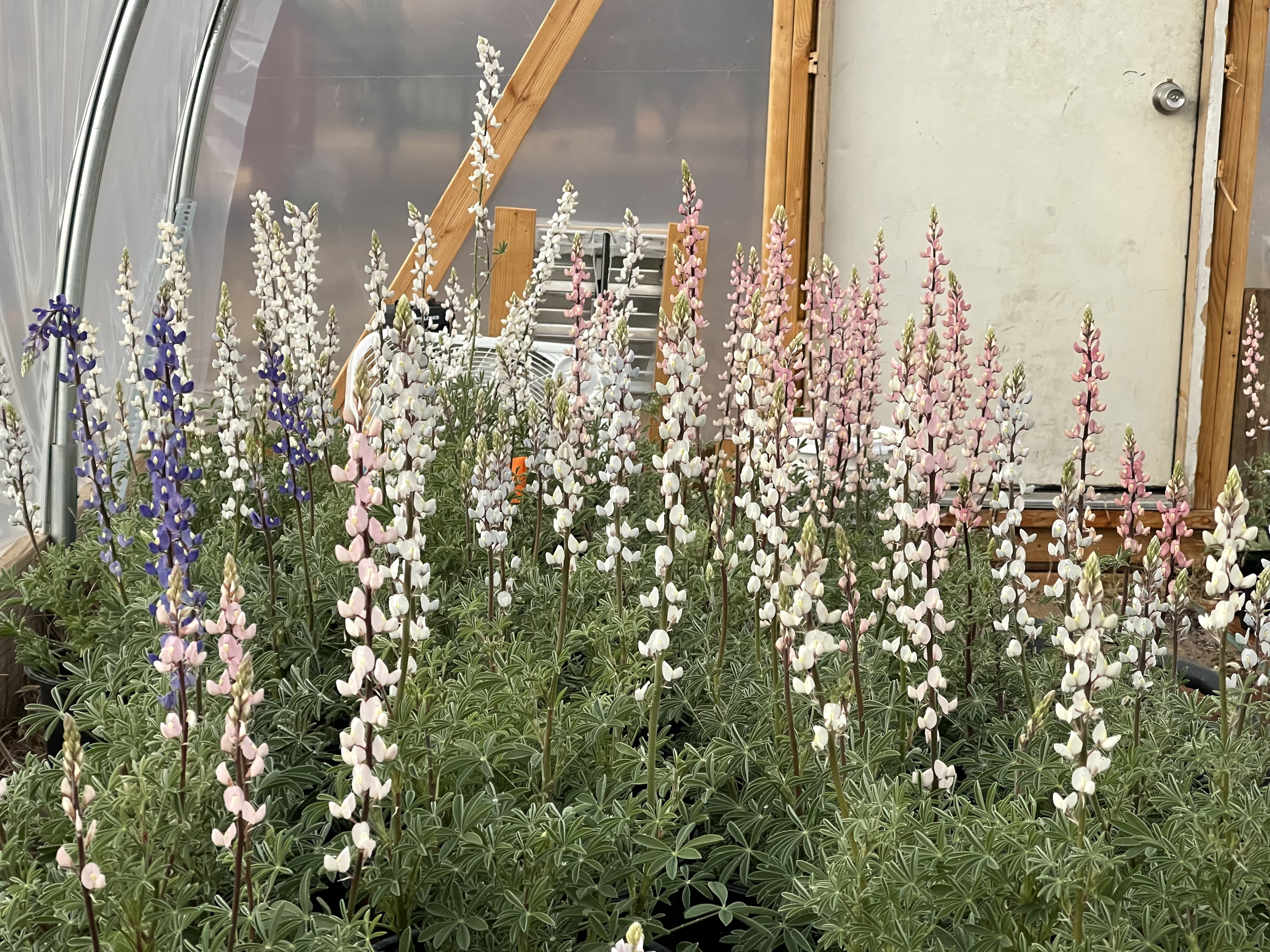
Pink, white, and blue Big Bend Bluebonnets in a greenhouse.

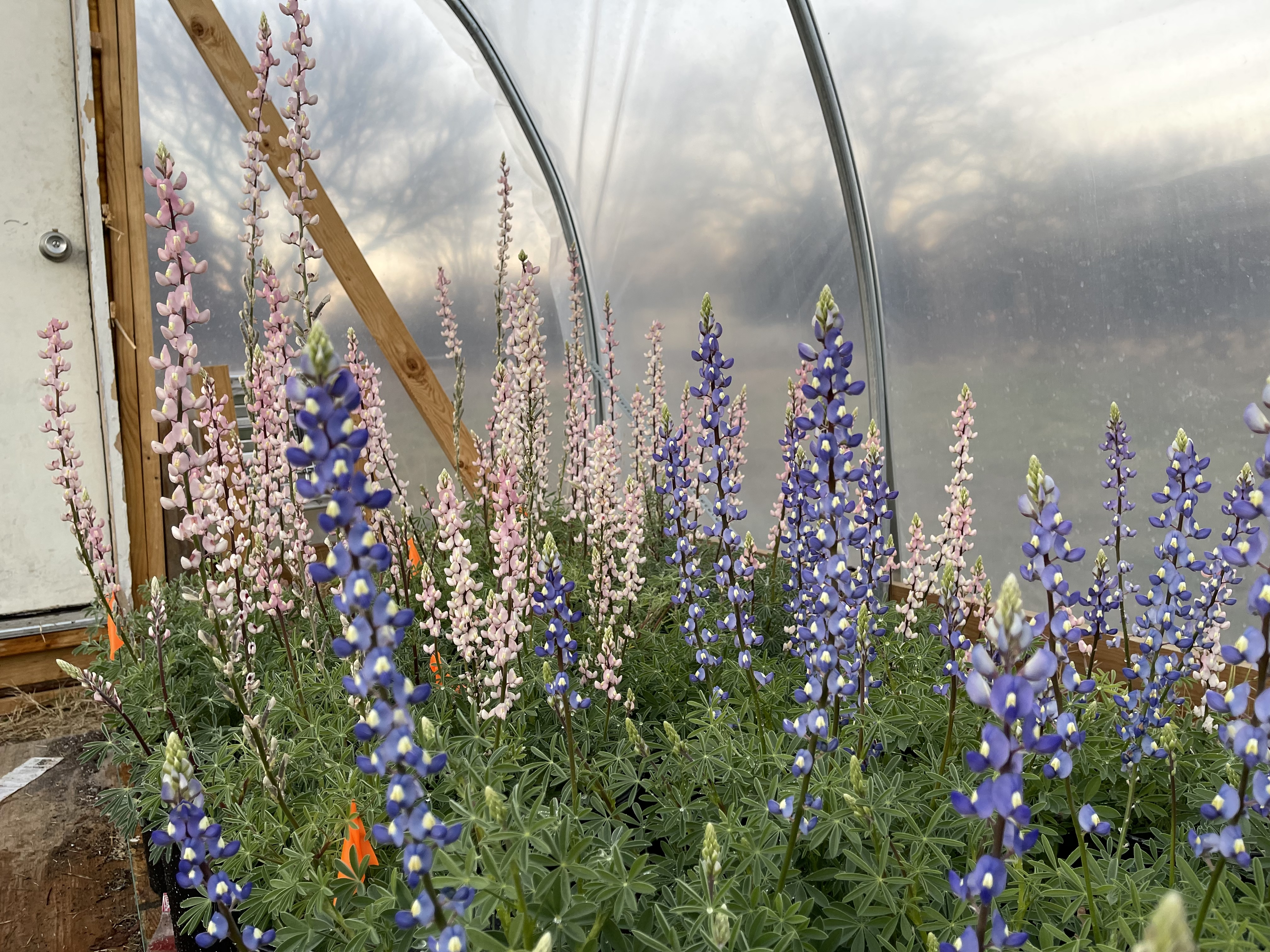
Pink and blue Big Bend Bluebonnets in a greenhouse.
