= Erythranthe inflatula =

Conservation status
- Imperiled (NatureServe)

Scientific classification
- Kingdom: Plantae
- Clade: Embryophytes
- Clade: Tracheophytes
- Clade: Angiosperms
- Clade: Eudicots
- Clade: Asterids
- Order: Lamiales
- Family: Phrymaceae
- Genus: Erythranthe
- Species: E. inflatula

Binomial name
- Erythranthe inflatula (Suksd.) G.L.Nesom

Synonyms
- Mimulus evanescens Meinke; Mimulus inflatulus Suksd.

Species of succulent

Erythranthe inflatula, synonyms Mimulus inflatulus and Mimulus evanescens, is a rare species of monkeyflower known by the common name disappearing monkeyflower. It is native to the western United States, where it is known from about ten locations in and around the Great Basin within the states of Idaho, Oregon, and California; it is also found in Nevada. Specimens of the plant had been catalogued as Mimulus breviflorus (now Erythranthe breviflora), but on further examination it was evident that they were a separate, unclassified species; this was described to science in 1995. It is thought that the plant may have evolved via hybridization between Erythranthe breviflora and Erythranthe latidens, or that it evolved from E. latidens and then into E. breviflora.

Erythranthe inflatula is a succulent annual herb coated with tiny glandular hairs and having a somewhat slimy texture. The thin stems grow mostly erect to a maximum height near 25 centimeters (9.8 in). The leaves are lance-shaped to oval and up to 4 centimeters (1.6 in) long by 3 centimeters (1.2 in) wide. The flowers are small and barely open, their tubular bases enclosed in a ribbed calyx of sepals, which becomes papery and inflated as the fruits mature. The flower is less than 1 centimeter (0.39 in) long and is mostly yellow in color, sometimes with brownish dots in the throat.

Erythranthe inflatula has been observed in rocky sagebrush habitat, especially in areas still moist from early spring soaking. Most of the areas where the plant grows are on rangeland used for grazing livestock. Threats to the plant include land degradation from cattle grazing, encroachment by invasive plant species, and changes in the hydrology of the plant's vernally wet habitat.
