= Erythranthe nudata =

- Along the Pope-to-Putah Trail, Napa County, California

Conservation status
- Apparently Secure (NatureServe)

Scientific classification
- Kingdom: Plantae
- Clade: Tracheophytes
- Clade: Angiosperms
- Clade: Eudicots
- Clade: Asterids
- Order: Lamiales
- Family: Phrymaceae
- Genus: Erythranthe
- Species: E. nudata

Binomial name
- Erythranthe nudata (Curran ex Greene) G.L.Nesom

Synonyms
- Mimulus dentatus A.Gray; Mimulus nudatus Curran ex Greene

Plant species in the lopseed family

Erythranthe nudata, the bare monkeyflower, is a species of monkeyflower endemic to the serpentine soils of Colusa, Lake and Napa Counties in California. It is an annual flower with bright yellow tube-shaped blooms and small narrow leaves.

== Taxonomy ==
This species was first described by Edward Lee Greene in 1885, naming it Mimulus nudatus but attributing it to Mary Katharine Curran. In 2012 it was moved to the Erythranthe genus by Guy L. Nesom. The species has one other synonym Mimulus dentatus published by Asa Gray in 1857, but it was an illegitimate name due to a prior use of the name. Erythranthe nudata is a member of the Erythranthe guttata species complex, a group of closely related wildflower species that vary dramatically in mating system, life history and edaphic tolerance. Species in the E. guttata complex are largely inter-fertile, with some notable exceptions. In particular, E. nudata is reproductively isolated from other complex members via a postzygotic isolating barrier during seed development.
