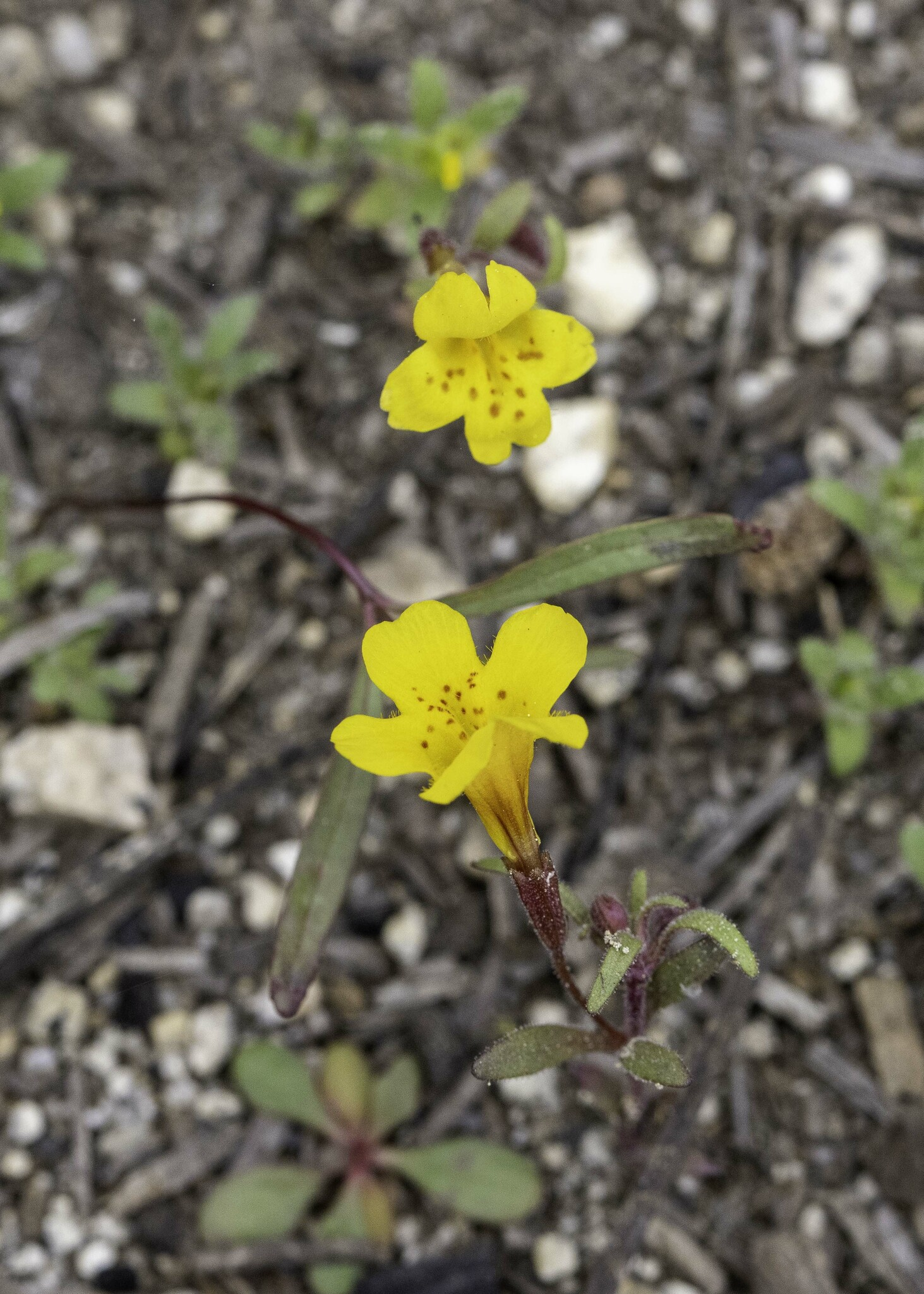

Conservation status
- Imperiled (NatureServe)

Scientific classification
- Kingdom: Plantae
- Clade: Embryophytes
- Clade: Tracheophytes
- Clade: Angiosperms
- Clade: Eudicots
- Clade: Asterids
- Order: Lamiales
- Family: Phrymaceae
- Genus: Erythranthe
- Species: E. montioides

Binomial name
- Erythranthe montioides (A.Gray) N.S.Fraga

Synonyms
- Mimulus montioides A.Gray; Mimulus rubellus var. latiflorus S.Watson

= Erythranthe montioides =

Species of flowering plant

Erythranthe montioides is a species of monkeyflower known by the common name montia-like monkeyflower. It is native to the Sierra Nevada and its foothills in California, and it has been observed in the mountains near Carson City, Nevada. It grows in moist areas in the mountains and disturbed, rocky soils. It was formerly known as Mimulus montioides.

== Description ==
It is a hairy annual herb growing up to about 18 centimeters (7 in) tall. The oppositely arranged leaves are linear in shape and up to 3 centimeters (1.2 in) long. The tubular, wide-faced flower may be yellow, purple, or bicolored, and some populations have more than one color type. The face of the flower is divided into five lobes, each of which may be subdivided into two lobes.
