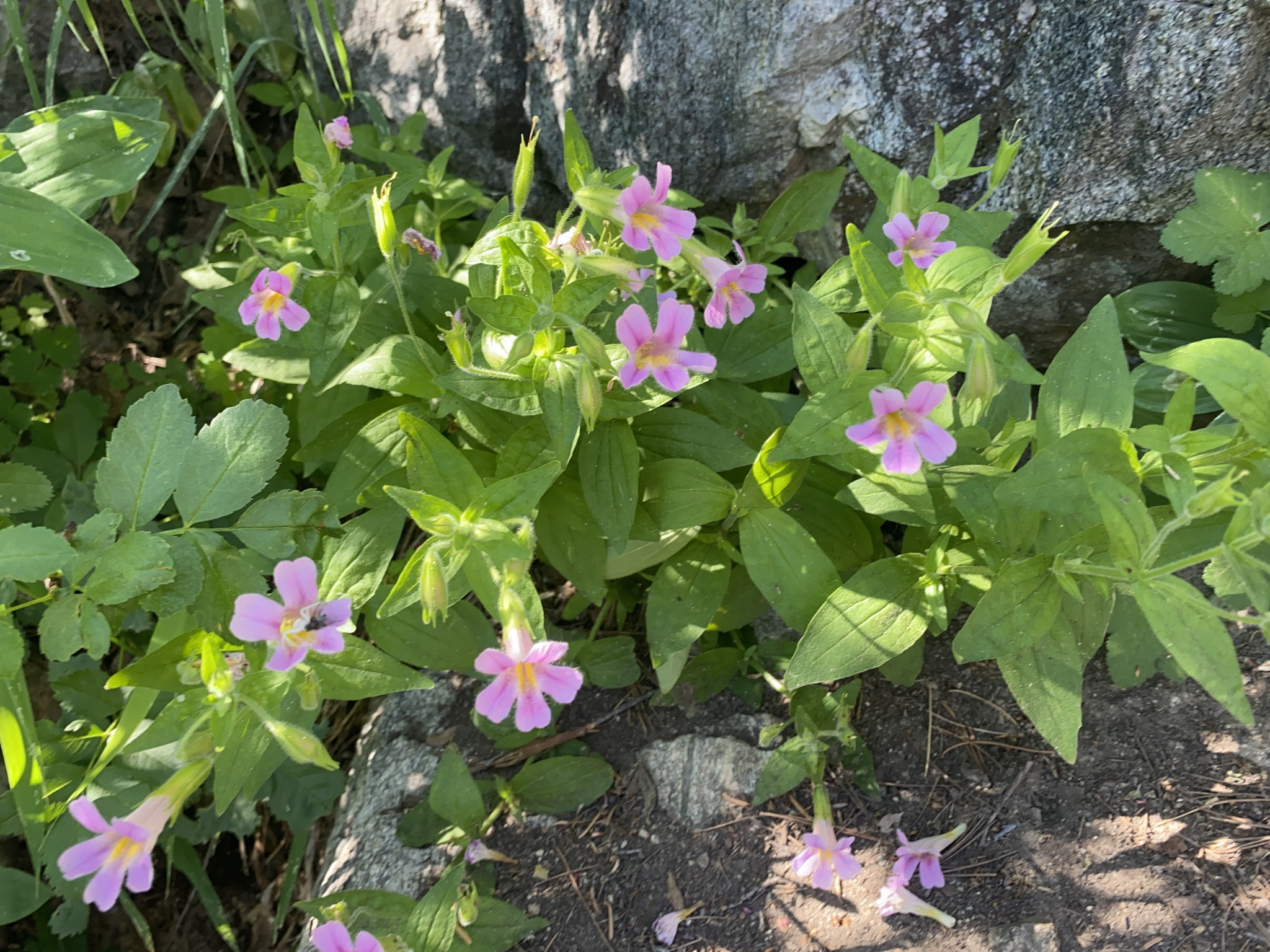
- South of Fallen Leaf Lake

Conservation status
- Unranked (NatureServe)

Scientific classification
- Kingdom: Plantae
- Clade: Embryophytes
- Clade: Tracheophytes
- Clade: Angiosperms
- Clade: Eudicots
- Clade: Asterids
- Order: Lamiales
- Family: Phrymaceae
- Genus: Erythranthe
- Species: E. erubescens

Binomial name
- Erythranthe erubescens G.L.Nesom

= Erythranthe erubescens =

Species of plant

Erythranthe erubescens, the California blushing monkeyflower, is a species of flowering plant in the family Phrymaceae, native to the U.S. states of California and Nevada. A perennial, it is found in the Sierra Nevada, and is sister to Erythranthe lewisii.
