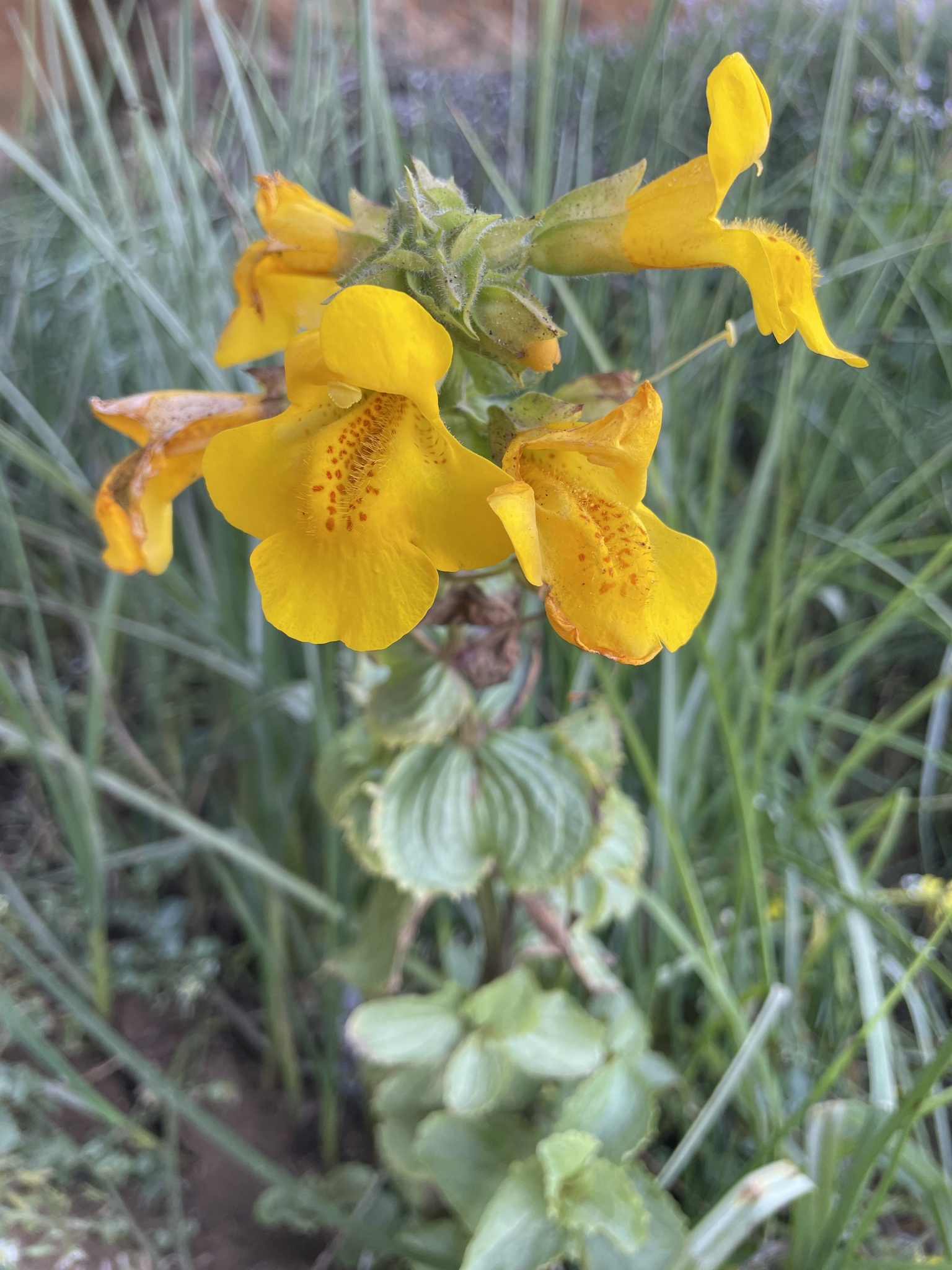

Conservation status
- Unranked (NatureServe)

Scientific classification
- Kingdom: Plantae
- Clade: Tracheophytes
- Clade: Angiosperms
- Clade: Eudicots
- Clade: Asterids
- Order: Lamiales
- Family: Phrymaceae
- Genus: Erythranthe
- Species: E. grandis

Binomial name
- Erythranthe grandis (Greene) G.L.Nesom (2012)

Synonyms
- Mimulus grandis (Greene) A.Heller (1904); Mimulus guttatus var. grandis Greene (1894); Mimulus langsdorffii var. grandis (Greene) Greene (1895); Mimulus procerus Greene (1909)

= Erythranthe grandis =

Species of plant

Erythranthe grandis, the magnificent monkeyflower, is a species of perennial flowering plant in the family Phrymaceae which is native to California and Oregon.

== Description ==
Erythranthe grandis is a coastal perennial species closely related to E. guttata. Prior to flowering and during winter months, it often has spreading prostrate growth habit many lateral branches (stolons). The peak of flowering is typically from May through August, which is later than nearby inland populations of E. guttata. The flowering inflorescences can become quite elongated in some populations. The height of plants of this species decreases with latitude, with very compact plants in the north and highly elongated plants in the south. The leaves of plant are typically thicker and are often waxier looking than E. guttata, especially when in direct proximity to the ocean. The leaf margins of E. grandis are generally rounded to dentate. The stems are typically thicker than most populations of E. guttata and are hollow. The calyxes of E. grandis typically have trichomes, some of which are glandular and some crinkly. In far Northern California into central Oregon, some populations have red spotting on their calyxes. Many biological researchers still refer to this species as a coastal perennial ecotype of Mimulus guttatus, as it is completely inter-fertile with other inland annual and perennial populations. Molecular genetic analyses have revealed that populations for E. grandis cluster as a distinct group from nearby inland populations of E. guttata. While E. grandis has recently been raised to the species level, it could also be regarded as a coastal perennial ecotype of E. guttata. E. grandis has evolved a higher level of salt tolerance than other related inland populations of E. guttata.

== Range and Habitat ==
It ranges from central California to Oregon, where it grows in coastal areas and the South Coast Ranges. Generally found in coastal seeps, cliff, dunes, marshes, roadside ditches, or headland with high levels of soil moisture from sea level up to 800 meters elevation.

== Ecology ==
Erythranthe grandis is strikingly different in morphology from inland annual populations of E. guttata. However, some inland perennial populations of E. guttata do resemble E. grandis. Many of the trait differences between perennial and annual populations is controlled primarily by a chromosomal inversion that is shared by E. grandis and perennial E. guttata. Annual E. guttata generally has the opposite orientation of this inversion. All populations of E. grandis are perennial and they are able to maintain this life-history due to lower temperatures along the ocean and coastal summer fog, which maintains soil moisture and reduces transpiration during the summer dry season. E. grandis has higher levels of herbivore defensive compounds and higher salt tolerance than inland annual populations of E. guttata. These higher levels of herbivore resistance and salt tolerance are likely the result of more herbivores in coastal habitats and the impact of oceanic salt spray landing on above-ground tissues.

== Taxonomy ==
From Nesom 2012:

"ERYTHRANTHE GRANDIS (Greene) Nesom, Phytoneuron 2012-40: 43. 2012. Mimulus grandis (Greene) Heller, Muhlenbergia 1: 110. 1904. Mimulus langsdorffii var. grandis (Greene) Greene, J. Bot. (Brit. & Foreign) 33: 7: 1895. Mimulus guttatus var. grandis Greene, Man. Bot. San Francisco Bay, 277. 1894. LECTOTYPE (designated here): USA. California. [Solano Co.:] Rocky hills 5 mi E from Vallejo, 10 Apr 1874, E.L. Greene s.n. (ND-Greene! photo-PH!). No type was cited in 1894 protologue, which noted only 'a conspicuous perennial of stream banks and some boggy places among the hills near the Bay.' Another collection of type material at ND-Greene is this: [Alameda Co.:] Berkeley, 20 Aug 1887, E.L. Greene s.n.; the label has handwritten "Mimulus grandis Greene." The label for the Solano County collection has "Mimulus luteus grandis" in Greene's handwriting."
