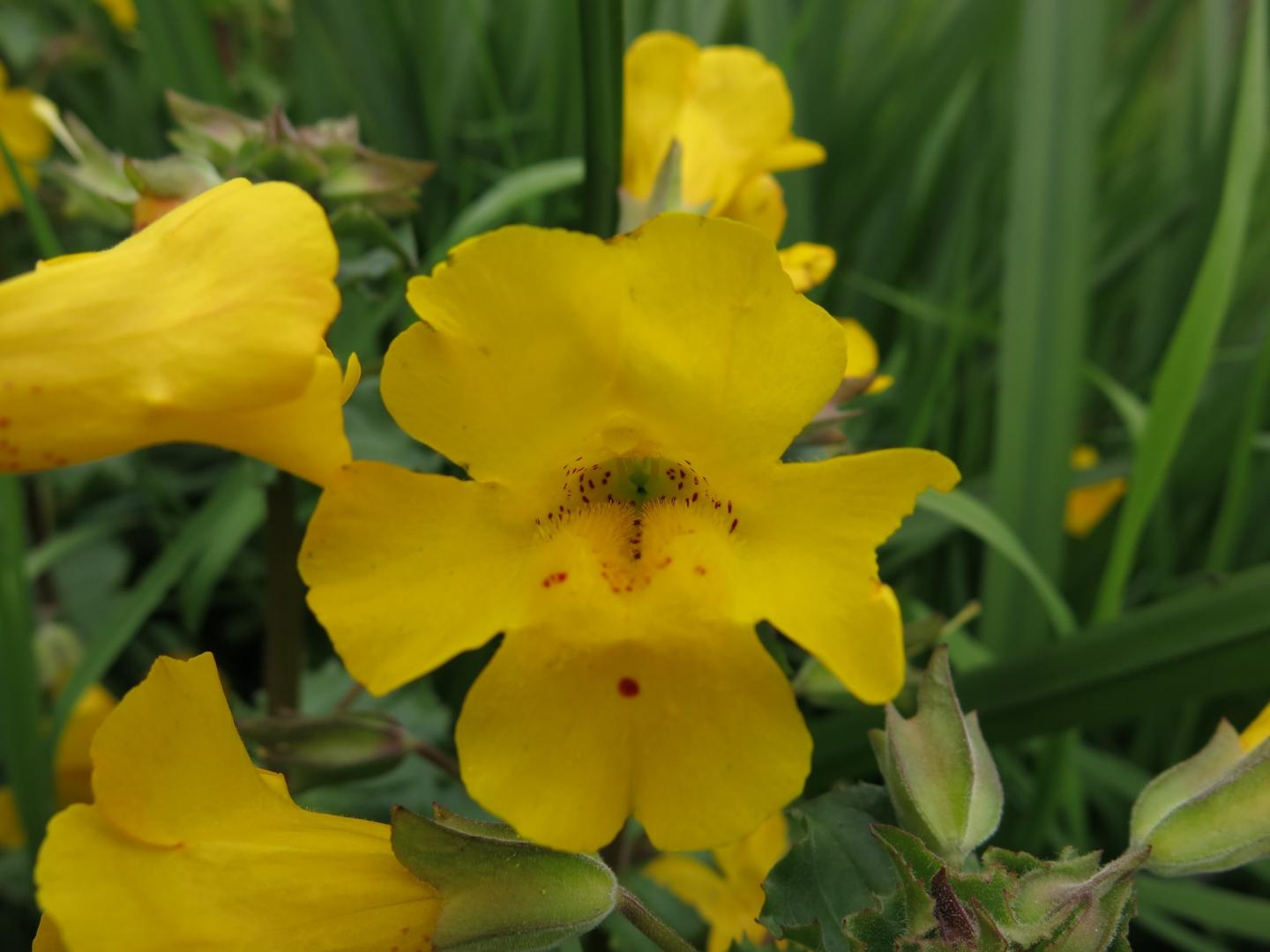
- E. peregrina in Scotland

Scientific classification
- Kingdom: Plantae
- Clade: Embryophytes
- Clade: Tracheophytes
- Clade: Angiosperms
- Clade: Eudicots
- Clade: Asterids
- Order: Lamiales
- Family: Phrymaceae
- Genus: Erythranthe (L.) G. L. Nesom

Type species
- Erythranthe cardinalis (Douglas ex Benth.) Spach ≡Mimulus cardinalis Douglas ex Bentham 1835

Synonyms
- Mimulus sect. Erythranthe (Spach) Greene, Bull. Calif. Acad. Sci. 1: 108. 1885

= Erythranthe =

Genus of flowering plants in the family Phrymaceae

Erythranthe, the monkey-flowers and musk-flowers, is a diverse plant genus with more than 120 members (as of 2022) in the family Phrymaceae. Erythranthe was originally described as a separate genus, then generally regarded as a section within the genus Mimulus, and recently returned to generic rank. Mimulus sect. Diplacus was segregated from Mimulus as a separate genus at the same time. Mimulus remains as a small genus of eastern North America and the Southern Hemisphere. Molecular data show Erythranthe and Diplacus to be distinct evolutionary lines that are distinct from Mimulus as strictly defined, although this nomenclature is controversial.

Member species are usually annuals or herbaceous perennials. Flowers are red, pink, or yellow, often in various combinations. A large number of the Erythranthe species grow in moist to wet soils with some growing even in shallow water. They are not very drought resistant, but many of the species now classified as Diplacus are. Species are found at elevations from oceanside to high mountains as well as a wide variety of climates, though most prefer wet areas such as riverbanks.

The largest concentration of species is in western North America, but species are found elsewhere in the United States and Canada, as well as from Mexico to Chile and eastern Asia. Pollination is mostly by either bees or hummingbirds. Member species are widely cultivated and are subject to several pests and diseases. Several species are listed as threatened by the International Union for Conservation of Nature.

== Description ==
Erythranthe is a highly diverse genus with the characteristics unifying the various species being axile placentation and long pedicels. Other characteristics of species can vary widely, especially between the sections, and even within some sections. Some species of Erythranthe are annuals and some are perennials. Flowers are red, pink, purple, or yellow, often in various combinations and shades of those colors. Some species produce copious amounts of aromatic compounds, giving them a musky odor (hence "musk-flowers"). Erythranthe is used as food by the larvae of some Lepidoptera species, such as the mouse moth (Amphipyra tragopoginis), as a main part of their diet.

Within the section Erythranthe, stems and leaves range from glabrous to hirsute, and are generally glandular. Leaves can be oblong, elliptical, or oval, with small tooths. Fruiting pedicels are longer than calyces. Calyces have sharp, definite angles and flat sides. Corollas are deciduous, relatively large (tube-throat 8–42 mm (0.3–1.7 in) long), and strongly red to purplish, magentarose, pink, or white, rarely yellow.

Erythranthe guttata is the most widespread of the genus Erythranthe and its characteristics are fairly representative of the genus. E. guttata is 5–80 cm (2–31 in) tall with disproportionately large 5–20 mm (0.2–0.8 in) long, tubular flowers. Leaves are opposite and oval, 1–10 cm (0.4–3.9 in) long. The species as strictly defined is perennial and spreads with stolons or rhizomes. The stem may be erect or recumbent. In the latter form, roots may develop at lower leaf nodes. Sometimes dwarfed, it may be hairless or have some hairs. Leaves are opposite, round to oval, usually coarsely and irregularly toothed or lobed. The bright yellow flowers are born on a raceme, most often with five or more flowers. The calyx has five lobes that are much shorter than the flower. Each flower has bilateral symmetry and has two lips. The upper lip usually has two lobes; the lower, three. The lower lip may have one large to many small red to reddish brown spots. The opening to the flower is hairy. The fruit is a two-valved capsule 1 cm (0.4 in) long, containing many seeds.

Erythranthe alsinoides is similar to several species found in the Pacific Northwest. It is an annual herb that blooms from April–June with a preference for shady and moist dense habitats. The plant is hairy to slightly hairy and grows from 0.5–3 dm (2–12 in) tall. The stems are often reddish. The leaves are opposite and have a few prominent upper veins. Blades are 0.5–2.5 cm (0.2–1.0 in) long. The petiole is about the same length. The flowers are yellow with reddish-brown spots, usually on the lower lip, and the upper and lower lips have fused, growing 8–14 cm (3.1–5.5 in). Each flower is attached by a pedicel. The fruits are capsules.

== Etymology and taxonomy ==
The derivation of Erythranthe is from Greek ἐρυθρός ("erythros"), red, with ἄνθος ("anthos"), flower. They are called monkey-flowers because some species have flowers shaped like a monkey's face. The widely used generic name, Latin mimus meaning "mimic actor", from the Greek mimos meaning "imitator" also alludes to the fancied monkey resemblance. The stem of Erythranthe can be either smooth or hairy, and this is known in a few species to be a trait determined by a simple allelic difference. At least E. lewisii is known to possess "flypaper-type" traps and is apparently protocarnivorous, supplementing its nutrients with small insects. Variations in color largely reflect concentrations of anthocyanins. The species that are subshrubs with woody stems were originally placed in the section Diplacus, and this was subsequently made a separate genus. Diplacus is clearly derived from within Mimulus, broadly defined, and was not usually considered to be a separate genus.

The French botanist Édouard Spach established Erythranthe as a separate genus with just the type species Erythranthe cardinalis. In 1885, American botanist Edward Lee Greene classified Erythranthe as a section of Mimulus while adding E. lewisii and E. parishii. In the 2012 restructuring of Mimulus by Barker et al., based largely upon DNA evidence, seven species were left in Mimulus as strictly defined; Erythranthe was greatly enlarged to include 111 species, based upon axile placentation and long pedicels, 46 placed into Diplacus (species with parietal placentation and sessile flowers), two placed in Uvedalia, and one each placed in Elacholoma, Mimetanthe, and Thyridia. All of the American genera are still referred to as "monkey-flowers".

Views on the evolutionary position of the monkey-flower species have changed. It was long considered to be in the family Scrophulariaceae, but is now placed in Phyrmaceae, primarily on the basis of DNA evidence. The genus Phryma (comprising only a single species), for which the family is named, is considerably different in morphology from all of the monkey-flowers.

Attempts at crossing species, whether from different sections or within the same section, of Erythranthe are not always successful. E. peregrina is an example of a successful naturally occurring hybrid that not only arose independently in two different locations, but is also a rare example of evolutionary recent allopolyploidization, complete chromosomal inheritance.

Charles Darwin's 1876 study of inbreeding depression and self-fertility in South American species was a progenitor for the study of Erythranthe biology. The genus has become a model system "for studies of evolutionary and ecological functional genomics ... [as it] ... contains a wide array of phenotypic, ecological and genomic diversity." Species under intense genomic study are mostly among the section Simiolus (E. guttata and relatives) and the section Erythranthe (including E. lewisii, E. cardinalis, E. parishii, and others). The genome sequence of E. guttata was released in late spring, 2007.

Many issues remain in Erythranthe taxonomy. E. guttata is highly complex, with many variations apparently reflecting differences in geographic environment and elevation. Molecular geneticists regard the species broadly as including both perennial and annual populations, but there is rationale for treating this complex as several distinct species (perennials are E. guttata, E. grandis, and E. corallina; annuals are E. microphylla and others). The perennials and annuals differ as groups from each other by an inversion sequence on chromosome 8. Evidence tentatively indicates that the perennials evolved from annual ancestors, although some evidence has been interpreted to indicate that E. nasuta evolved from E. guttata in central California between 500,000 and 200,000 years ago and since then become primarily a self-pollinator. Relationships among the apparently closely related E. tilingii, E. minor, and E. caespitosa are not clearly understood. Some currently recognized species may be just variants of other species: E. arenicola, E. brachystylis, E. regni. Chromosomal issues may affect the classification of some species: E. corallina, E. guttata, E. nasuta, E. tilingii, and E. utahensis.

== Species ==
=== Species listed alphabetically ===
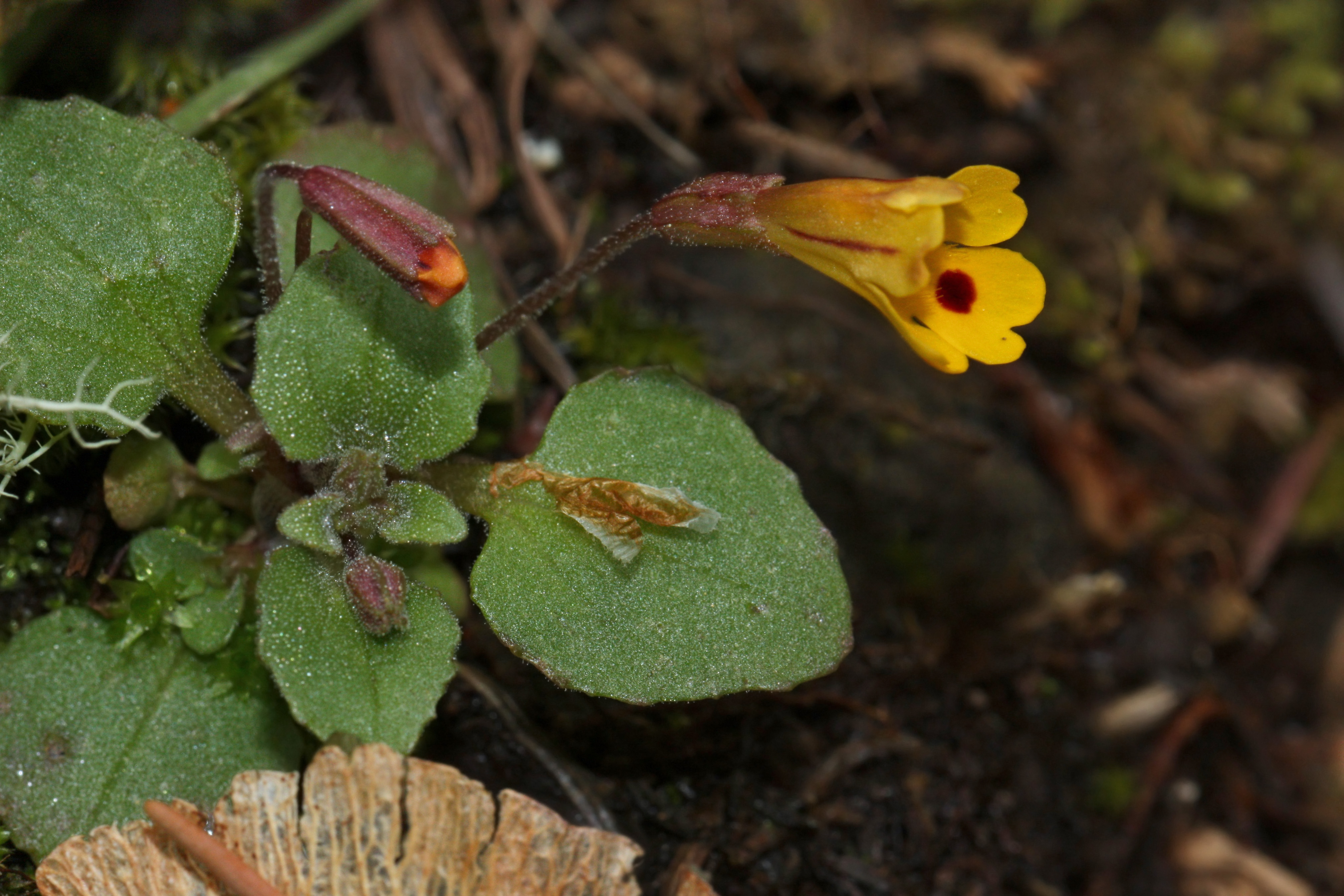
E. alsinoides in Oregon

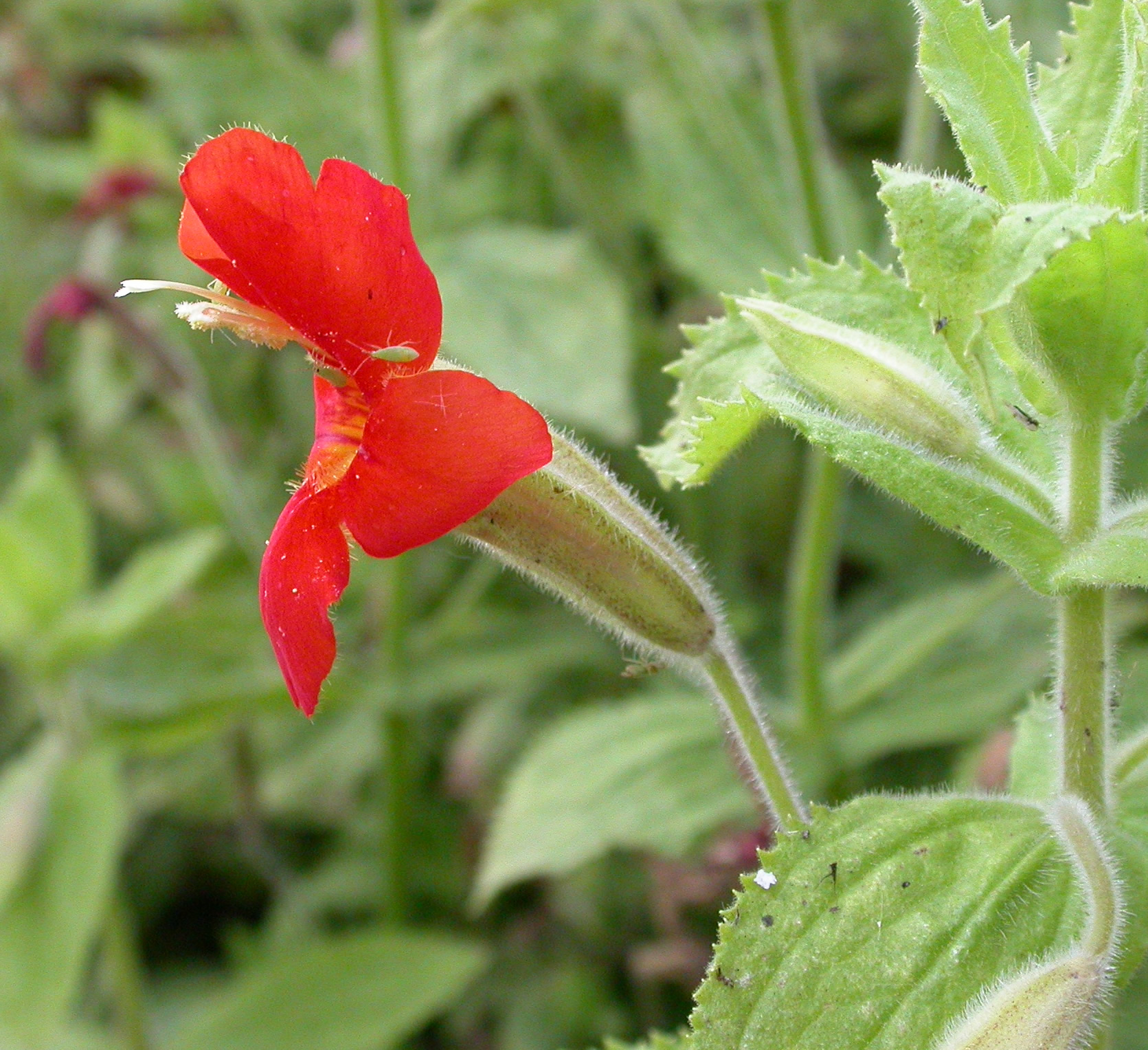
E. cardinalis in southern California

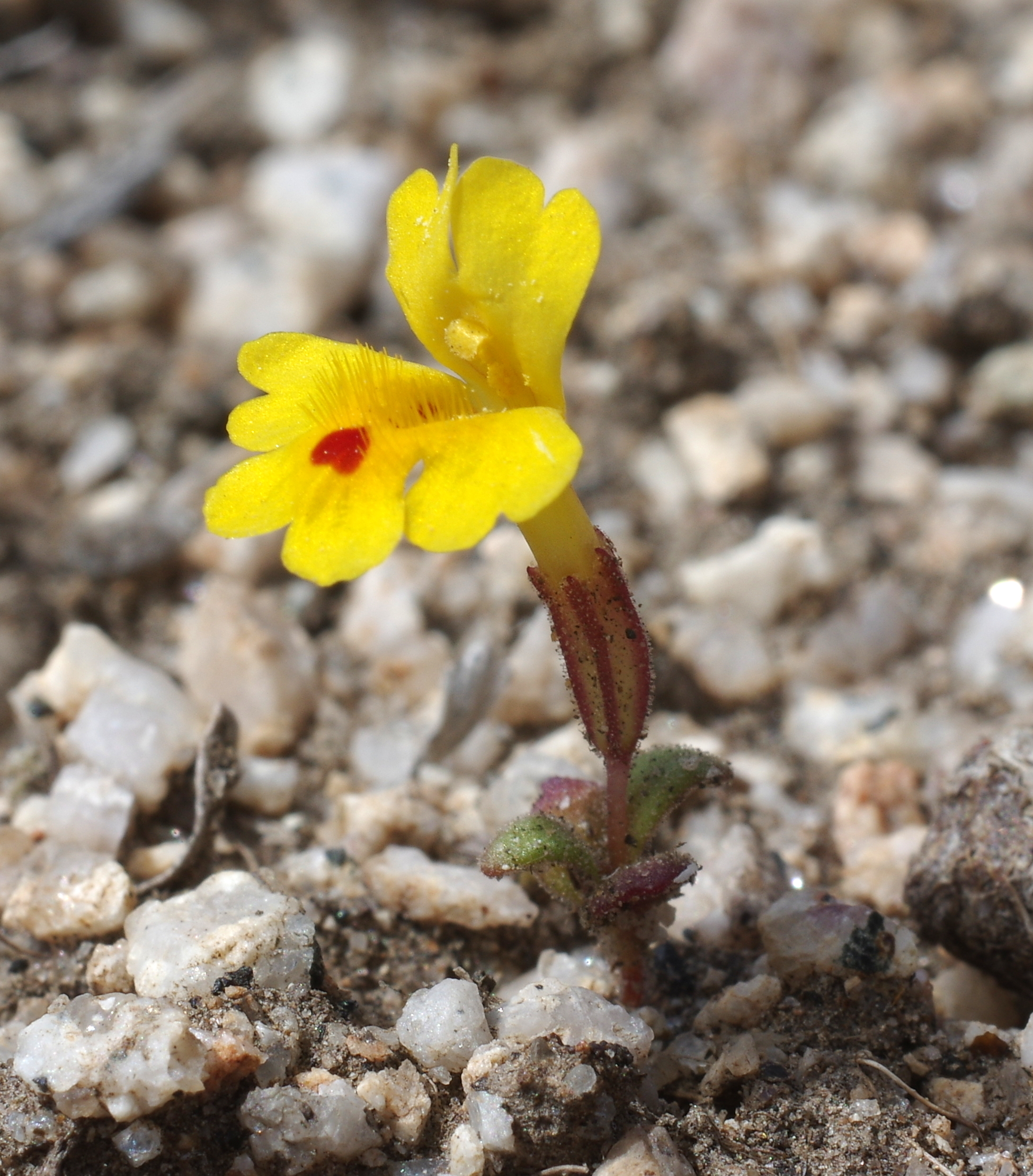
E. carsonensis in Nevada

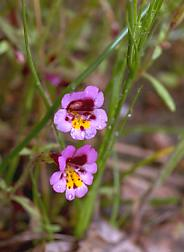
E filicaulis in Sierra Nevada

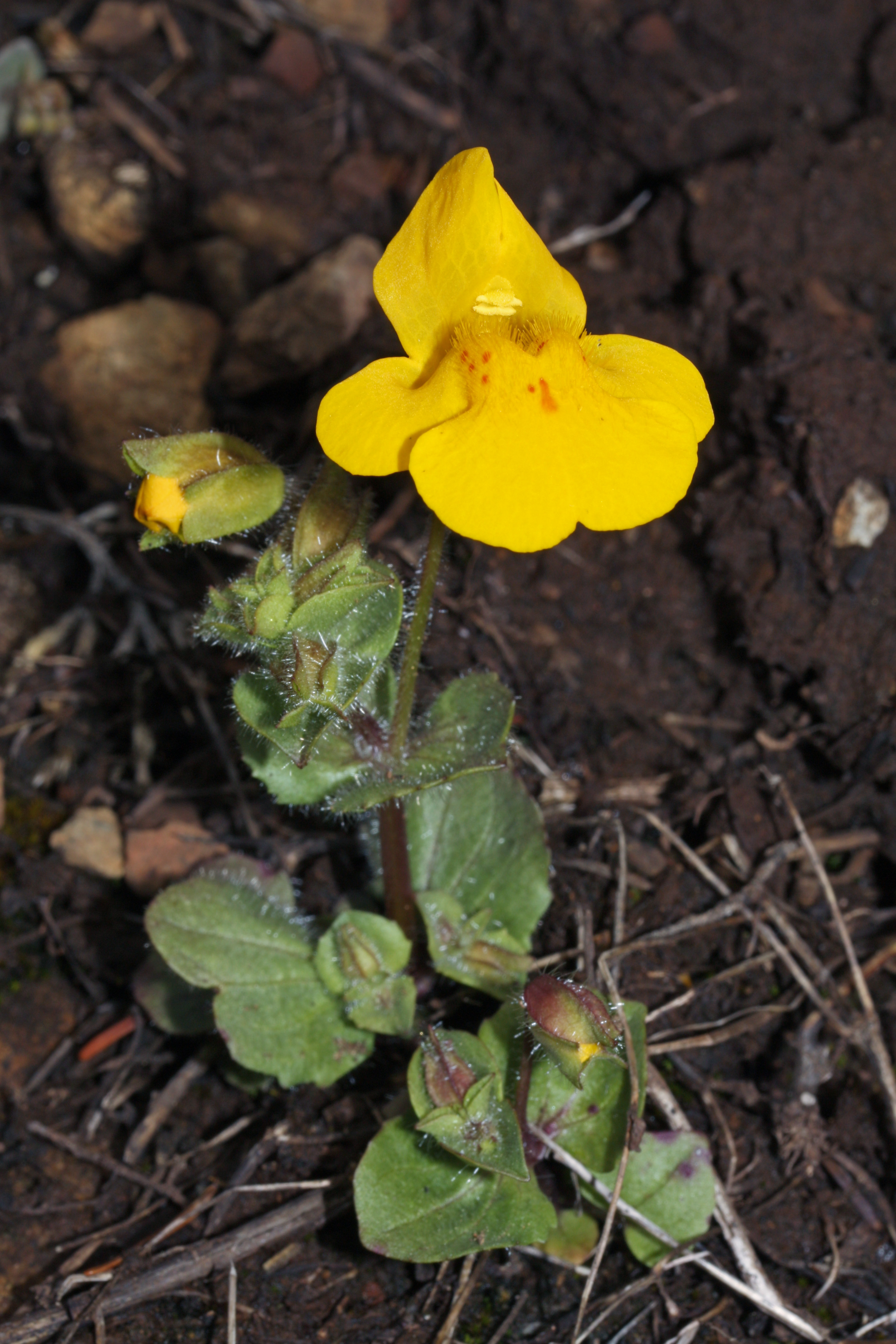
E. guttata in Skagit County, Washington

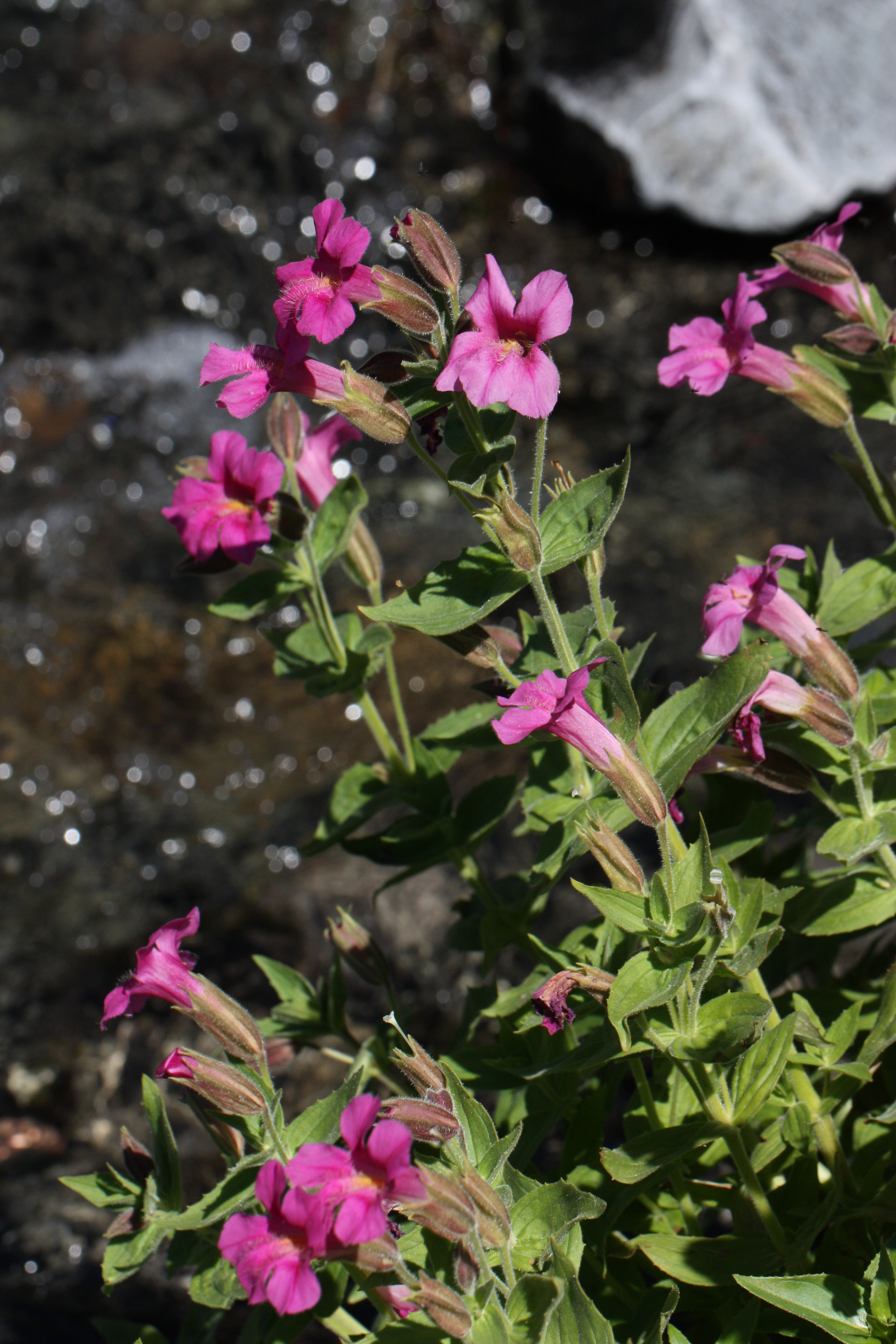
E. lewisii in Mount Rainier National Park

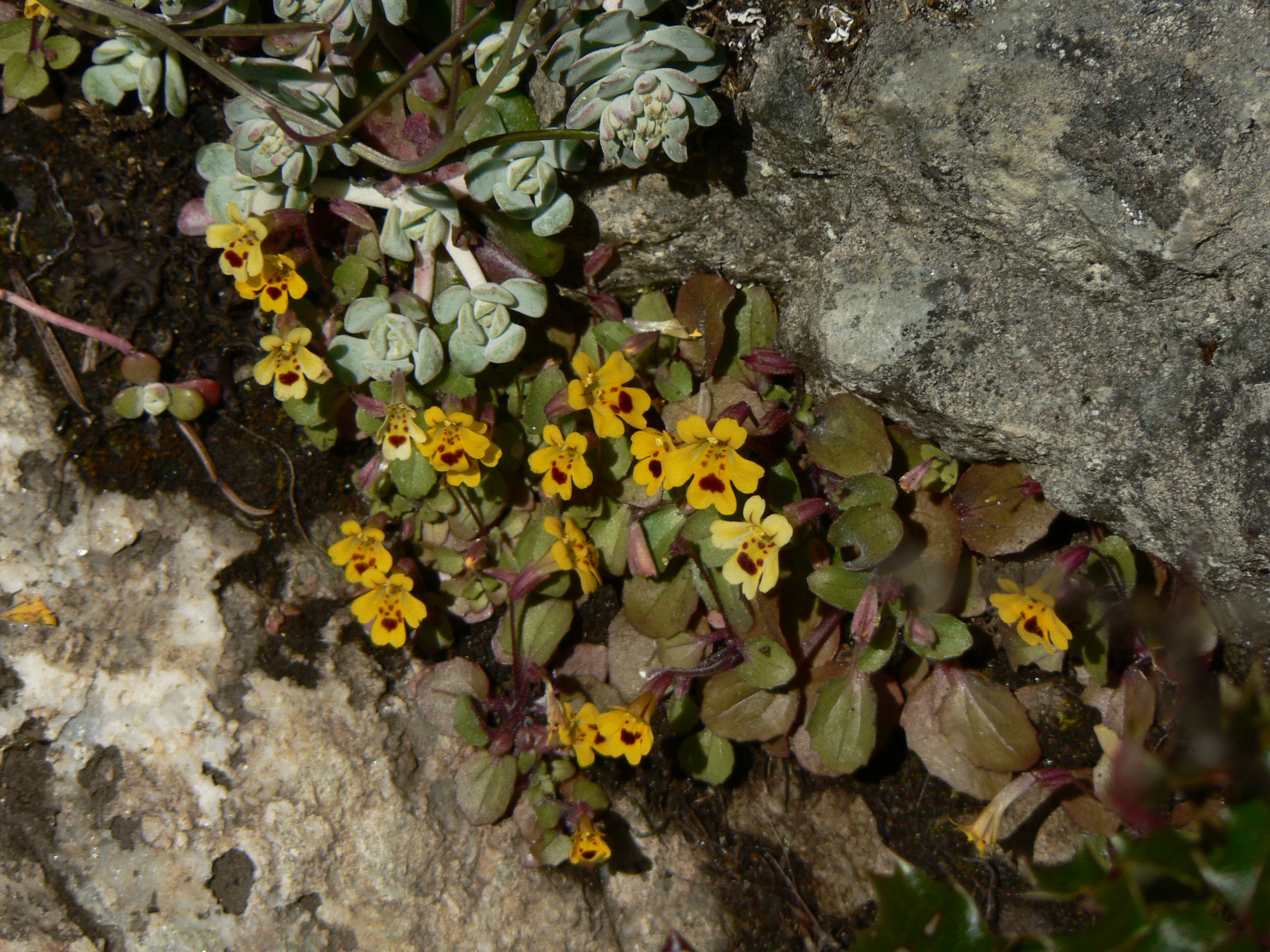
E. primuloides in Washington

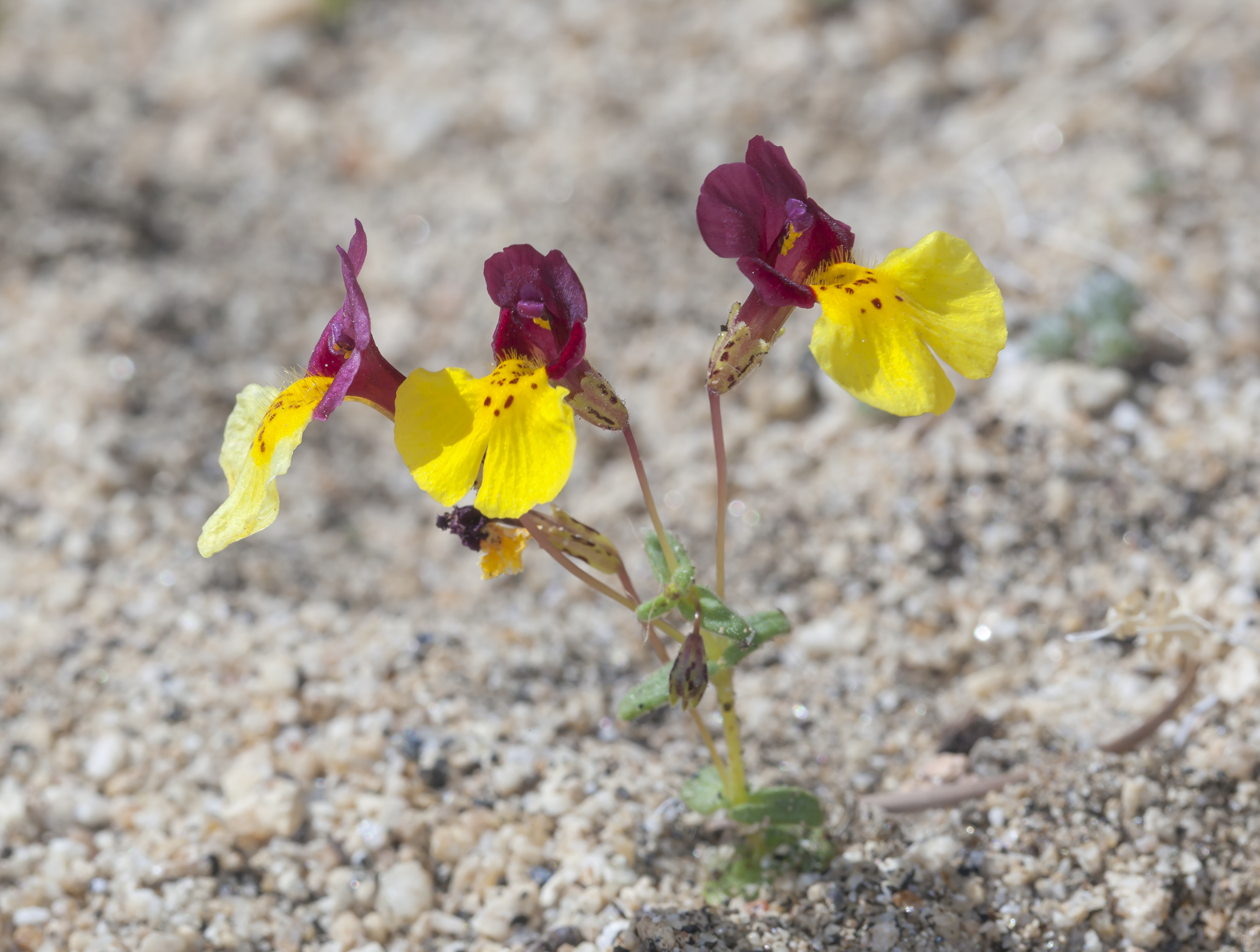
E. shevockii

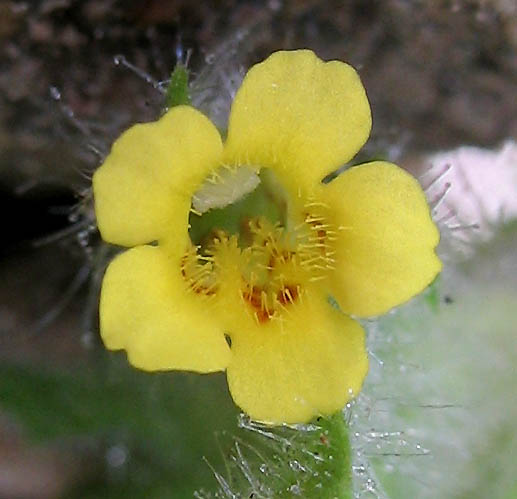
E. floribunda in southern California

As of April 2022, Plants of the World Online accepted the following species and hybrids:

- Erythranthe acutidens (Greene) G.L.Nesom
- Erythranthe alsinoides (Douglas ex Benth.) G.L.Nesom & N.S.Fraga – chickweed monkey-flower (British Columbia to northern California)
- Erythranthe ampliata (A.L.Grant) G.L.Nesom
- Erythranthe androsacea (Curran ex Greene) N.S.Fraga – rockjasmine monkey-flower (California)
- Erythranthe arenaria (A.L.Grant) G.L.Nesom
- Erythranthe arenicola (Pennell) G.L.Nesom
- Erythranthe arvensis (Greene) G.L.Nesom
- Erythranthe austrolatidens G.L.Nesom
- Erythranthe barbata (Greene) N.S.Fraga
- Erythranthe bhutanica (Yamazaki) G.L.Nesom – (Asia)
- Erythranthe bicolor (Hartw. ex Benth.) G.L.Nesom & N.S.Fraga – yellow and white monkey-flower (California)
- Erythranthe bodinieri (Vaniot) G.L.Nesom – (Asia)
- Erythranthe brachystylis (Edwin) G.L.Nesom
- Erythranthe bracteosa (P.C.Tsoong) G.L.Nesom – (Asia)
- Erythranthe breviflora (Piper) G.L.Nesom – (British Columbia to California to Wyoming)
- Erythranthe brevinasuta G.L.Nesom
- Erythranthe breweri (Greene) G.L.Nesom & N.S.Fraga – Brewer's monkey-flower (British Columbia to California to Colorado)
- Erythranthe bridgesii (Benth.) G.L.Nesom – (South America)
- Erythranthe caespitosa (Greene) G.L.Nesom
- Erythranthe calcicola N.S.Fraga
- Erythranthe calciphila (Gentry) G.L.Nesom
- Erythranthe cardinalis (Douglas ex Benth.) Spach – scarlet monkey-flower (southwestern United States and Baja California)
- Erythranthe carsonensis N.S.Fraga – Carson Valley monkey-flower (California and Nevada)
- Erythranthe charlestonensis G.L.Nesom
- Erythranthe chinatiensis G.L.Nesom
- Erythranthe cinnabarina G.L.Nesom
- Erythranthe corallina (Greene) G.L.Nesom
- Erythranthe cordata (Greene) G.L.Nesom
- Erythranthe cuprea (Dombrain) G.L.Nesom – Flor de cobre (Eng: copper flower) (central and southern Chile)
- Erythranthe decora (A.L.Grant) G.L.Nesom
- Erythranthe dentata (Nutt. ex Benth.) G.L.Nesom – toothleaf monkey-flower, coastal monkey-flower (British Columbia to northern California)
- Erythranthe dentiloba (B.L.Rob. & Fernald) G.L.Nesom
- Erythranthe depressa (Phil.) G.L.Nesom
- Erythranthe diffusa (A.L.Grant) N.S.Fraga
- Erythranthe diminuens G.L.Nesom – (Sonora, Mexico)
- Erythranthe discolor (A.L.Grant) N.S.Fraga
- Erythranthe eastwoodiae (Rydb.) G.L.Nesom & N.S.Fraga
- Erythranthe erubescens G.L.Nesom
- Erythranthe exigua (A.Gray) G.L.Nesom & N.S.Fraga – San Bernardino Mountains monkey-flower (southern California, Baja California)
- Erythranthe filicaulis (S.Watson) G.L.Nesom & N.S.Fraga – slender-stemmed monkey-flower (California)
- Erythranthe filicifolia (Sexton, K.G.Ferris & Schoenig) G.L.Nesom
- Erythranthe flammea G.L.Nesom
- Erythranthe floribunda (Douglas ex Lindl.) G.L.Nesom – manyflowered monkey-flower (western Canada, Pacific Coast, Rocky Mountains, northern Mexico)
- Erythranthe gemmipara (W.A.Weber) G.L.Nesom & N.S.Fraga – Rocky Mountain monkey-flower (Colorado)
- Erythranthe geniculata (Greene) G.L.Nesom
- Erythranthe geyeri (Torr.) G.L.Nesom
- Erythranthe glabrata (Kunth) G.L.Nesom – roundleaf monkey-flower (widespread in North America, Mesoamerica and South America)
- Erythranthe glaucescens (Greene) G.L.Nesom – shieldbract monkey-flower (California)
- Erythranthe gracilipes (B.L.Rob.) N.S.Fraga – slenderstalk monkey-flower (California)
- Erythranthe grandis (Greene) G.L.Nesom
- Erythranthe grayi (A.L.Grant) G.L.Nesom
- Erythranthe guttata (Fisch. ex DC.) G.L.Nesom – common large monkey-flower, common monkey-flower, stream monkey-flower, seep monkey-flower (AK, AZ, CA, CO, CT, DE, ID, MI, MT, ND, NE, NM, NV, NY, OR, PA, SD, UT, WA, WY; Canada: BC, Yukon; Mexico to Guatemala; naturalized in Britain)
- Erythranthe hallii (Greene) G.L.Nesom
- Erythranthe hardhamiae N.S.Fraga
- Erythranthe howaldiae G.L.Nesom
- Erythranthe hymenophylla (Meinke) G.L.Nesom
- Erythranthe inamoena (Greene) G.L.Nesom
- Erythranthe inconspicua (A.Gray) G.L.Nesom – small-flower monkeyflower (California)
- Erythranthe inflata (Miq.) G.L.Nesom – (Asia)
- Erythranthe inflatula (Suksd.) G.L.Nesom
- Erythranthe jungermannioides (Suksd.) G.L.Nesom
- Erythranthe karakormiana (Yamazaki) G.L.Nesom – (Asia)
- Erythranthe laciniata (A.Gray) G.L.Nesom
- Erythranthe lagunensis G.L.Nesom
- Erythranthe latidens (Greene) G.L.Nesom – broadtooth monkey-flower (southern California, Baja California)
- Erythranthe lewisii (Pursh) G.L.Nesom & N.S.Fraga – great purple monkey-flower, Lewis' monkey-flower (BC, AB; Alaska to California to Colorado)
- Erythranthe linearifolia (A.L.Grant) G.L.Nesom & N.S.Fraga
- Erythranthe lutea (L.) G.L.Nesom – yellow monkey-flower, monkey musk, blotched monkey-flower, and blood-drop-emlets (North and South America, naturalized in Britain)
- Erythranthe madrensis (Seem.) G.L.Nesom
- Erythranthe marmorata (Greene) G.L.Nesom
- Erythranthe michiganensis (Pennell) G.L.Nesom – Michigan monkey-flower (Michigan)
- Erythranthe microphylla (Benth.) G.L.Nesom
- Erythranthe minima (C.Bohlen) J.M.Watson & A.R.Flores– (Michoacan, Mexico)
- Erythranthe minor (A. Nelson) G.L.Nesom
- Erythranthe montioides (A.Gray) N.S.Fraga – montia-like monkey-flower (California, Nevada)
- Erythranthe moschata (Douglas ex Lindl.) G.L.Nesom – (North and South America, naturalized in Britain and Finland)
- Erythranthe naiandina (J.M.Watson & C.Bohlen) G.L.Nesom
- Erythranthe nasuta (Greene) G.L.Nesom
- Erythranthe nelsonii (A.L.Grant) G.L.Nesom & N.S.Fraga – In 2014 Nesom lists as a synonym of Erythranthe verbenacea
- Erythranthe nepalensis (Benth.) G.L.Nesom (Asia)
- Erythranthe norrisii (Heckard & Shevock) G.L.Nesom
- Erythranthe nudata (Curran ex Greene) G.L.Nesom
- Erythranthe orizabae (Benth.) G.L.Nesom – (Mexico)
- Erythranthe pallens (Greene) G.L.Nesom
- Erythranthe palmeri (A.Gray) N.S.Fraga – Palmer's monkey-flower (central California south to Baja California)
- Erythranthe pardalis (Pennell) G.L.Nesom
- Erythranthe parishii (Greene) G.L.Nesom & N.S.Fraga – Parish's monkey-flower (southern California, western Nevada, Baja California)
- Erythranthe parvula (Wooton & Standl.) G.L.Nesom
- Erythranthe patula (Pennell) G.L.Nesom
- Erythranthe pennellii (Gentry) G.L.Nesom
- Erythranthe percaulis G.L.Nesom
- Erythranthe platyphylla (Franch.) G.L.Nesom – (Asia)
- Erythranthe plotocalyx G.L.Nesom
- Erythranthe primuloides (Benth.) G.L.Nesom & N.S.Fraga – primrose monkey-flower (WA, OR, CA, ID, NV, UT, AZ, MT, NM)
- Erythranthe procera (A.L.Grant) G.L.Nesom – (Asia)
- Erythranthe ptilota G.L.Nesom
- Erythranthe pulsiferae (A.Gray) G.L.Nesom – candelabrum monkey-flower (Washington to northern California)
- Erythranthe purpurea (A.L.Grant) N.S.Fraga – little purple monkey-flower (southern California, Baja California)
- Erythranthe regni G.L.Nesom
- Erythranthe rhodopetra N.S.Fraga
- Erythranthe rubella (A.Gray) N.S.Fraga – little redstem monkey-flower (CA, NV, UT, WY, CO, NM, TX)
- Erythranthe rupestris (Greene) G.L.Nesom & N.S.Fraga
- Erythranthe scouleri (Hook.) G.L.Nesom
- Erythranthe serpentinicola D.J.Keil
- Erythranthe sessilifolia (Maxim.) G.L.Nesom – (Asia)
- Erythranthe shevockii (Heckard & Bacig.) N.S.Fraga – Kelso Creek monkey-flower (Kern County, California)
- Erythranthe sierrae N.S.Fraga
- Erythranthe sinoalba G.L.Nesom – (Asia)
- Erythranthe sookensis B.G. Benedict – newly discovered 2012, originally named M. sookensis (British Columbia to northern California)
- Erythranthe stolonifera (Novopokr.) G.L.Nesom – (Russia)
- Erythranthe suksdorfii (A.Gray) N.S.Fraga – Suksdorf's monkey-flower and miniature monkey-flower (Washington, Oregon, California, Idaho, Montana, Wyoming, Colorado, Nevada, Utah, Arizona, New Mexico)
- Erythranthe szechuanensis (Pai) G.L.Nesom – (Asia)
- Erythranthe taylorii G.L.Nesom
- Erythranthe tenella (Bunge) G.L.Nesom – (Asia)
- Erythranthe thermalis (A. Nelson) G.L.Nesom – (Yellowstone National Park)
- Erythranthe tibetica (P.C.Tsoong & H.P.Yang) G.L.Nesom – (Asia)
- Erythranthe tilingii (Regel) G.L.Nesom – large mountain monkey-flower, Tiling's monkey-flower (Alaska to New Mexico)
- Erythranthe trinitiensis G.L.Nesom
- Erythranthe unimaculata (Pennell) G.L.Nesom
- Erythranthe utahensis (Pennell) G.L.Nesom
- Erythranthe verbenacea (Greene) G.L.Nesom & N.S.Fraga
- Erythranthe veronicifolia (Greene) G.L.Nesom
- Erythranthe visibilis G.L.Nesom
- Erythranthe washingtonensis (Gand.) G.L.Nesom
- Erythranthe willisii G.L.Nesom

Hybrids:

- Erythranthe × burnetii (S.Arn.) Silverside
- Erythranthe × hybrida (Voss) Silverside
- Erythranthe × maculosa (T.Moore) Mabb.
- Erythranthe × robertsii (Silverside) G.L.Nesom, syn. Erythranthe peregrina (M. Vallejo-Marin) G.L.Nesom – newly discovered 2012, originally named M. peregrinus (Scotland)

=== Species listed sectionally ===
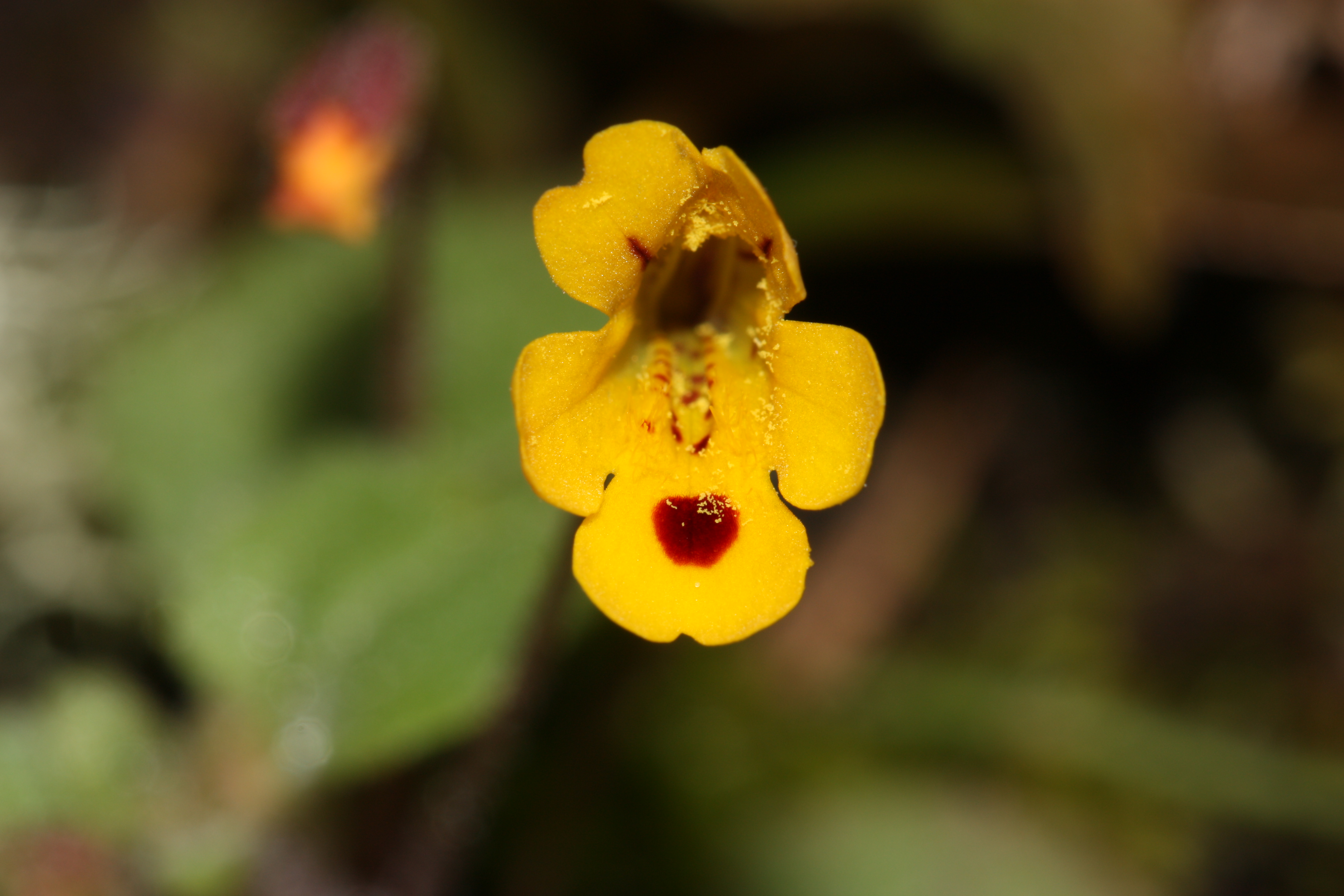
E. alsinoides in Oregon

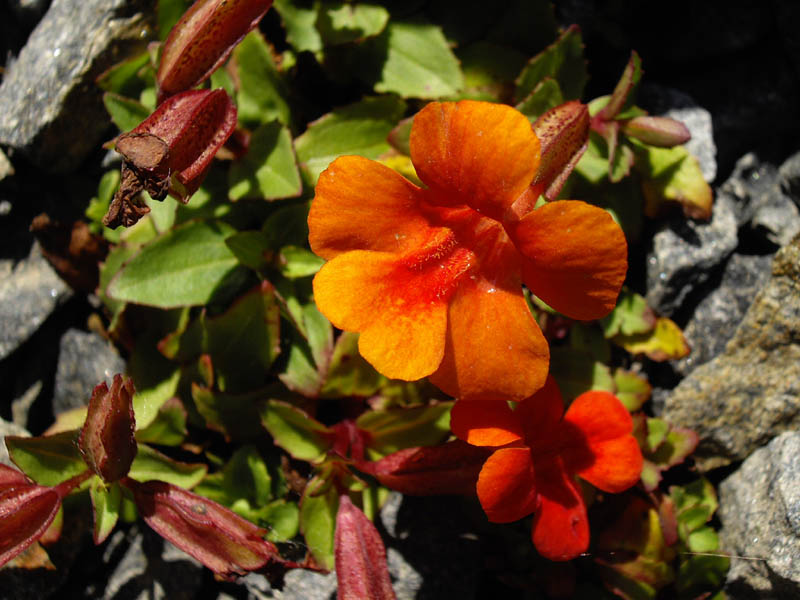
E. cuprea

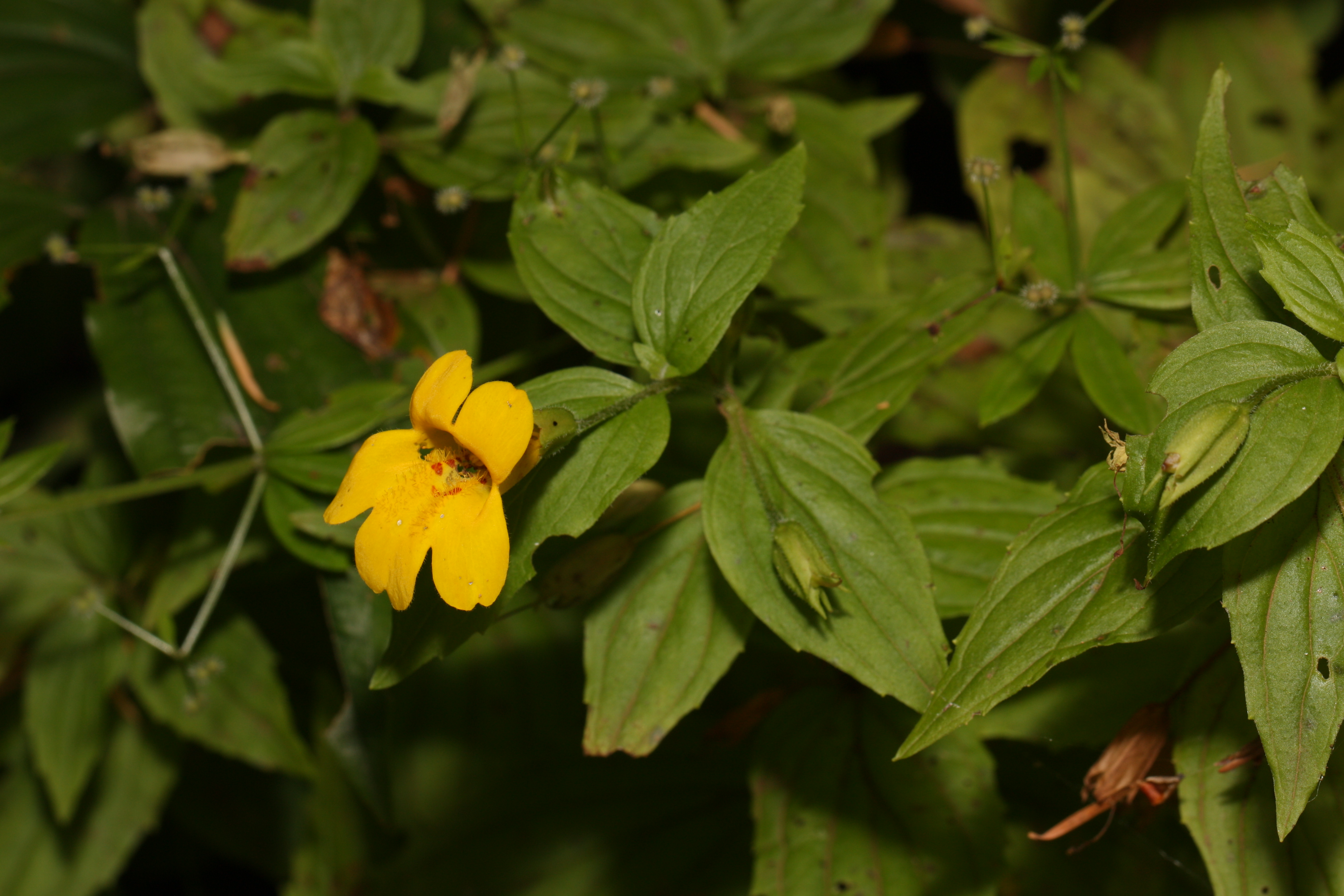
E. dentatus

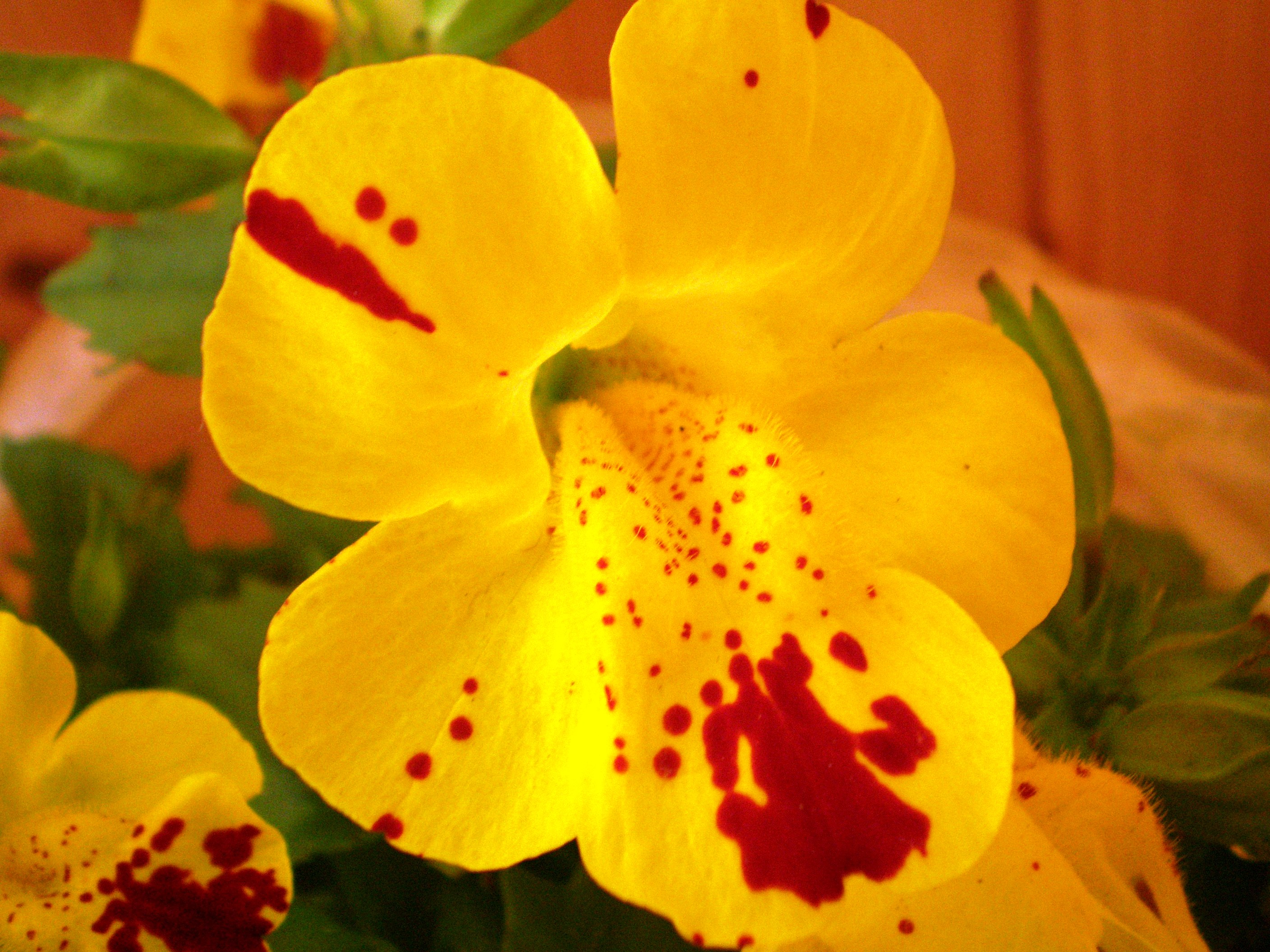
E. lutea

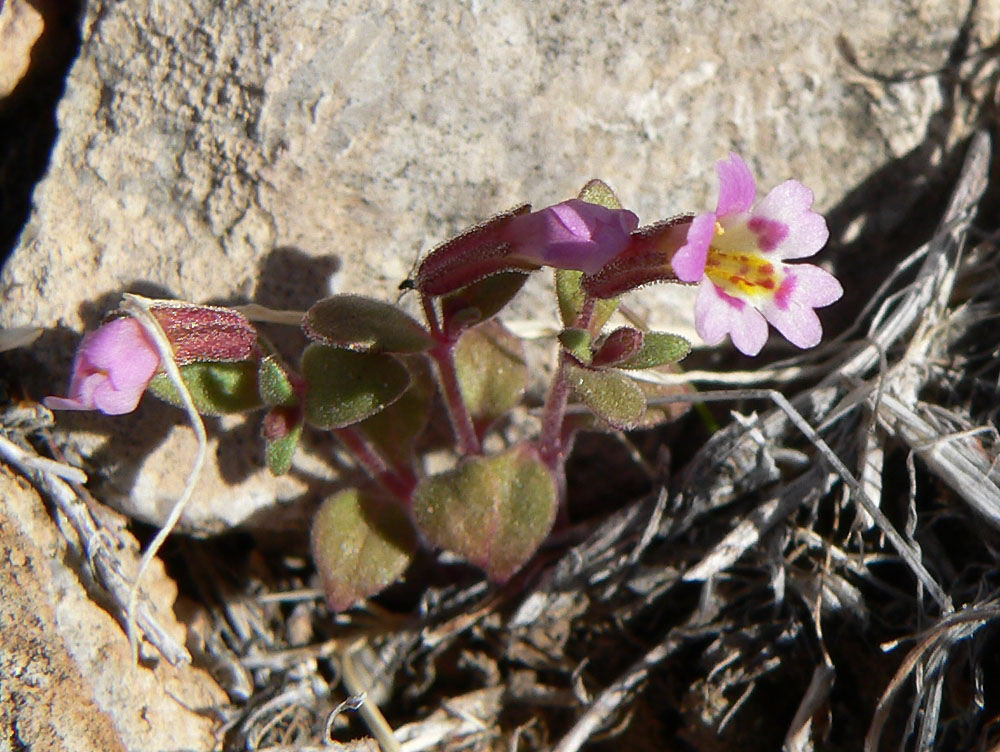
E. rubella on Fossil Ridge, Blue Diamond Hill, Nevada

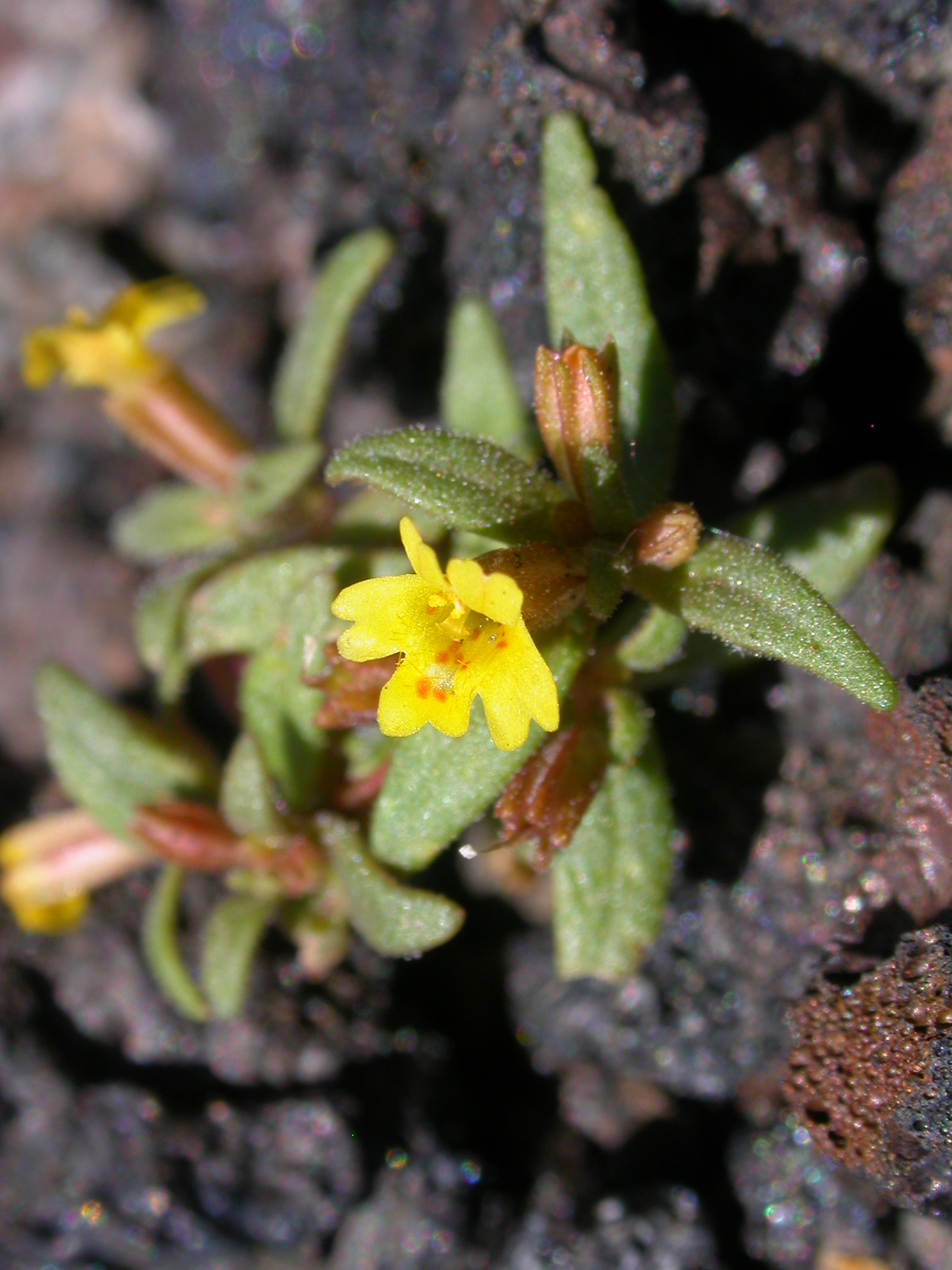
E. suksdorfii in Butte County, Idaho

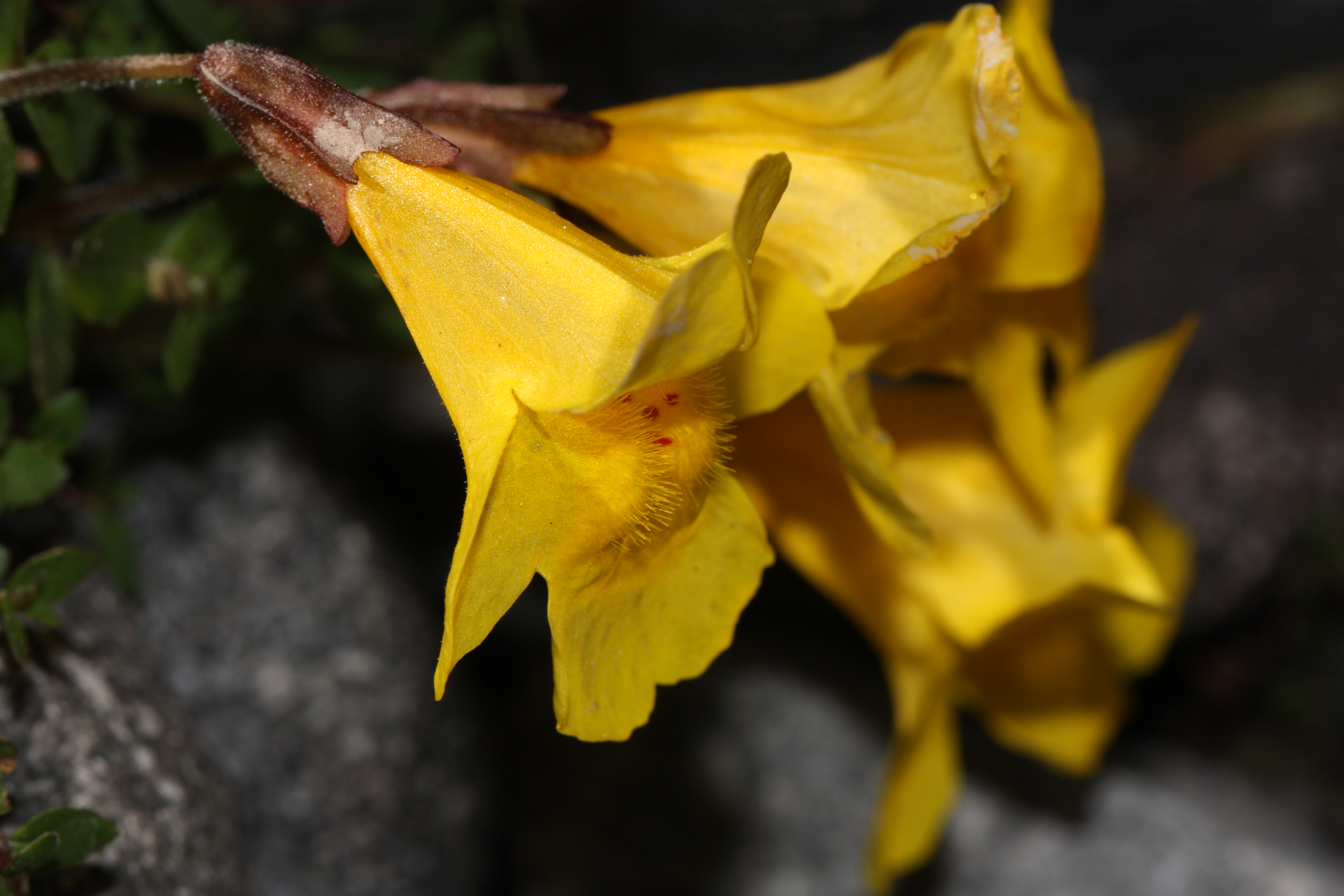
E. tilingii

In a 2014 paper, G. L. Nesom and N. S. Fraga placed Erythranthe members into the following 12 sections (unless listed below as "newly discovered"). Names accepted as of April 2022 are from Plants of the World Online.

- Erythranthe sect. Simiolus

Erythranthe arenicola (Pennell) G.L.Nesom
Erythranthe arvensis (Greene) G.L.Nesom
Erythranthe brachystylis (Edwin) G.L.Nesom
Erythranthe brevinasuta G.L.Nesom
Erythranthe caespitosa (Greene) G.L.Nesom
Erythranthe calciphila (Gentry) G.L.Nesom
Erythranthe charlestonensis G.L.Nesom
Erythranthe chinatiensis G.L.Nesom
Erythranthe corallina (Greene) G.L.Nesom
Erythranthe cordata (Greene) G.L.Nesom
Erythranthe decora (A.L.Grant) G.L.Nesom
Erythranthe diminuens G.L.Nesom – newly discovered in 2017 and added to this list (Sonora, Mexico)
Erythranthe dentiloba (B.L.Rob. & Fernald) G.L.Nesom
Erythranthe filicifolia (Sexton, K.G.Ferris & Schoenig) G.L.Nesom
Erythranthe geyeri (Torr.) G.L.Nesom
Erythranthe glabrata (Kunth) G.L.Nesom – roundleaf monkey-flower (widespread in North America, Mesoamerica and South America)
Erythranthe glaucescens (Greene) G.L.Nesom – shieldbract monkey-flower (California)
Erythranthe grandis (Greene) G.L.Nesom
Erythranthe guttata (Fisch. ex DC.) G.L.Nesom – common large monkey-flower, common monkey-flower, stream monkey-flower, seep monkey-flower (AK, AZ, CA, CO, CT, DE, ID, MI, MT, ND, NE, NM, NV, NY, OR, PA, SD, UT, WA, WY; Canada: BC, Yukon; Mexico to Guatemala; naturalized in Britain)
Erythranthe hallii (Greene) G.L.Nesom
Erythranthe inamoena (Greene) G.L.Nesom
Erythranthe laciniata (A.Gray) G.L.Nesom
Erythranthe lagunensis G.L.Nesom
Erythranthe madrensis (Seem.) G.L.Nesom
Erythranthe marmorata (Greene) G.L.Nesom
Erythranthe michiganensis (Pennell) G.L.Nesom – Michigan monkey-flower (Michigan)
Erythranthe microphylla (Benth.) G.L.Nesom
Erythranthe minima (C.Bohlen) J.M.Watson & A.R.Flores – (Michoacan, Mexico)
Erythranthe minor (A. Nelson) G.L.Nesom
Erythranthe nasuta (Greene) G.L.Nesom
Erythranthe nudata (Curran ex Greene) G.L.Nesom
Erythranthe pallens (Greene) G.L.Nesom
Erythranthe pardalis (Pennell) G.L.Nesom
Erythranthe parvula (Wooton & Standl.) G.L.Nesom
Erythranthe pennellii (Gentry) G.L.Nesom
Erythranthe percaulis G.L.Nesom
Erythranthe peregrina M. Vallejo-Marin, synonym of Erythranthe × robertsii – newly discovered 2012, originally named M. peregrinus (Scotland)
Erythranthe regni G.L.Nesom
Erythranthe scouleri (Hook.) G.L.Nesom
Erythranthe sookensis B.G. Benedict – originally named M. sookensis (British Columbia to northern California)
Erythranthe thermalis (A. Nelson) G.L.Nesom – (Yellowstone National Park)
Erythranthe tilingii (Regel) G.L.Nesom – large mountain monkey-flower, Tiling's monkey-flower (Alaska to New Mexico)
Erythranthe unimaculata (Pennell) G.L.Nesom
Erythranthe utahensis (Pennell) G.L.Nesom
Erythranthe visibilis G.L.Nesom
- (South America)
Erythranthe acaulis (Phil.) G.L.Nesom, synonym of Erythranthe depressa var. depressa
Erythranthe andicola (Kunth) G.L.Nesom, synonym of Erythranthe glabrata
Erythranthe cuprea (Dombrain) G.L.Nesom – Flor de cobre (Eng: copper flower) (central and southern Chile)
Erythranthe depressa (Phil.) G.L.Nesom
Erythranthe lacerata (Pennell) G.L.Nesom, synonym of Erythranthe lutea var. lutea
Erythranthe lutea (L.) G.L.Nesom – yellow monkey-flower, monkey musk, blotched monkey-flower, and blood-drop-emlets (North and South America, naturalized in Britain)
Erythranthe naiandina (J.M.Watson & C.Bohlen) G.L.Nesom
Erythranthe parviflora (Lindl.) G.L.Nesom
Erythranthe pilosiuscula (Kunth) G.L.Nesom, synonym of Erythranthe glabrata

- Erythranthe sect. Erythranthe

Erythranthe cardinalis (Douglas ex Benth.) Spach – scarlet monkey-flower (southwestern United States and Baja California)
Erythranthe cinnabarina G.L.Nesom
Erythranthe eastwoodiae (Rydb.) G.L.Nesom & N.S.Fraga
Erythranthe erubescens G.L.Nesom
Erythranthe flammea
Erythranthe lewisii (Pursh) G.L.Nesom & N.S.Fraga – great purple monkey-flower, Lewis' monkey-flower (Alaska to California to Colorado)
Erythranthe nelsonii (A.L.Grant) G.L.Nesom & N.S.Fraga – In 2014 Nesom lists as a synonym of Erythranthe verbenacea
Erythranthe parishii (Greene) G.L.Nesom & N.S.Fraga – Parish's monkey-flower (southern California, western Nevada, Baja California)
Erythranthe rupestris (Greene) G.L.Nesom & N.S.Fraga
Erythranthe verbenacea (Greene) G.L.Nesom & N.S.Fraga

- Erythranthe sect. Mimulosma

Erythranthe ampliata (A.L.Grant) G.L.Nesom
Erythranthe arenaria (A.L.Grant) G.L.Nesom
Erythranthe austrolatidens G.L.Nesom
Erythranthe breviflora (Piper) G.L.Nesom – (British Columbia to California to Wyoming)
Erythranthe floribunda (Douglas ex Lindl.) G.L.Nesom – manyflowered monkey-flower (western Canada, Pacific Coast, Rocky Mountains, northern Mexico)
Erythranthe geniculata (Greene) G.L.Nesom
Erythranthe hymenophylla (Meinke) G.L.Nesom
Erythranthe inflatula (Suksd.) G.L.Nesom
Erythranthe inodora (Greene) G.L.Nesom, synonym of Erythranthe moschata
Erythranthe jungermannioides (Suksd.) G.L.Nesom
Erythranthe latidens (Greene) G.L.Nesom – broadtooth monkey-flower (southern California, Baja California)
Erythranthe moniliformis (Greene) G.L.Nesom, synonym of Erythranthe moschata
Erythranthe moschata (Douglas ex Lindl.) G.L.Nesom – (North and South America, naturalized in Britain and Finland)
Erythranthe norrisii (Heckard & Shevock) G.L.Nesom
Erythranthe patula (Pennell) G.L.Nesom
Erythranthe pulsiferae (A.Gray) G.L.Nesom – candelabrum monkey-flower (Washington to northern California)
Erythranthe taylorii G.L.Nesom
Erythranthe trinitiensis G.L.Nesom
Erythranthe washingtonensis (Gand.) G.L.Nesom
Erythranthe stolonifera (Novopokr.) G.L.Nesom – (Russia)

- Erythranthe sect. Achlyopitheca

Erythranthe acutidens (Greene) G.L.Nesom
Erythranthe grayi (A.L.Grant) G.L.Nesom
Erythranthe inconspicua (A.Gray) G.L.Nesom – (syns. Mimulus acutidens and M. grayi)

- Erythranthe sect. Paradantha

Erythranthe androsacea (Curran ex Greene) N.S.Fraga – rockjasmine monkey-flower (California)
Erythranthe barbata (Greene) N.S.Fraga
Erythranthe calcicola N.S.Fraga
Erythranthe carsonensis N.S.Fraga – Carson Valley monkey-flower (California and Nevada)
Erythranthe diffusa (A.L.Grant) N.S.Fraga
Erythranthe discolor (A.L.Grant) N.S.Fraga
Erythranthe gracilipes (B.L.Rob.) N.S.Fraga – slenderstalk monkey-flower (California)
Erythranthe hardhamiae N.S.Fraga
Erythranthe montioides (A.Gray) N.S.Fraga – montia-like monkey-flower (California, Nevada)
Erythranthe palmeri (A.Gray) N.S.Fraga – Palmer's monkey-flower (central California south to Baja California)
Erythranthe purpurea (A.L.Grant) N.S.Fraga – little purple monkey-flower (southern California, Baja California)
Erythranthe rhodopetra N.S.Fraga
Erythranthe rubella (A.Gray) N.S.Fraga – little redstem monkey-flower (CA, NV, UT, WY, CO, NM, TX)
Erythranthe shevockii (Heckard & Bacig.) N.S.Fraga – Kelso Creek monkey-flower (Kern County, California)
Erythranthe sierrae N.S.Fraga
Erythranthe suksdorfii (A.Gray) N.S.Fraga – Suksdorf's monkey-flower and miniature monkey-flower (Washington, Oregon, California, Idaho, Montana, Wyoming, Colorado, Nevada, Utah, Arizona, New Mexico)

- Erythranthe sect. Monantha

Erythranthe linearifolia (A.L.Grant) G.L.Nesom & N.S.Fraga
Erythranthe primuloides (Benth.) G.L.Nesom & N.S.Fraga – primrose monkey-flower (WA, OR, CA, ID, NV, UT, AZ, MT, NM)

- Erythranthe sect. Monimanthe

Erythranthe bicolor (Hartw. ex Benth.) G.L.Nesom & N.S.Fraga – yellow and white monkey-flower (California)
Erythranthe breweri (Greene) G.L.Nesom & N.S.Fraga – Brewer's monkey-flower (British Columbia to California to Colorado)
Erythranthe filicaulis (S.Watson) G.L.Nesom & N.S.Fraga – slender-stemmed monkey-flower (California)

- Erythranthe sect. Alsinimimulus

Erythranthe alsinoides (Douglas ex Benth.) G.L.Nesom & N.S.Fraga – chickweed monkey-flower (British Columbia to northern California)

- Erythranthe sect. Simigemma

Erythranthe gemmipara (W.A.Weber) G.L.Nesom & N.S.Fraga – Rocky Mountain monkey-flower (Colorado)

- Erythranthe sect. Exigua

Erythranthe exigua (A.Gray) G.L.Nesom & N.S.Fraga – San Bernardino Mountains monkey-flower (southern California, Baja California)

- Erythranthe sect. Sinopitheca

Erythranthe bracteosa (P.C.Tsoong) G.L.Nesom – (Asia)
Erythranthe bridgesii (Benth.) G.L.Nesom – (South America)
Erythranthe platyphylla (Franch.) G.L.Nesom – (Asia)
Erythranthe sessilifolia (Maxim.) G.L.Nesom – (Asia)
Erythranthe tibetica (P.C.Tsoong & H.P.Yang) G.L.Nesom – (Asia)

- Erythranthe sect. Mimulasia

Erythranthe dentata (Nutt. ex Benth.) G.L.Nesom – toothleaf monkey-flower, coastal monkey-flower (British Columbia to northern California)
Erythranthe orizabae (Benth.) G.L.Nesom – (Mexico)
Erythranthe bhutanica (Yamazaki) G.L.Nesom – (Asia)
Erythranthe bodinieri (Vaniot) G.L.Nesom – (Asia)
Erythranthe inflata (Miq.) G.L.Nesom – (Asia)
Erythranthe karakormiana (Yamazaki) G.L.Nesom – (Asia)
Erythranthe nepalensis (Benth.) G.L.Nesom – (Asia)
Erythranthe procera (A.L.Grant) G.L.Nesom – (Asia)
Erythranthe sinoalba G.L.Nesom – (Asia)
Erythranthe szechuanensis (Pai) G.L.Nesom – (Asia)
Erythranthe tenella (Bunge) G.L.Nesom – (Asia)

== Reproductive biology ==
Before recognition of E. cinnabarina as a species, E. lewisii was interpreted to be the sister of E. cardinalis. It is now clear that E. cinnabarina and E. cardinalis are sister species and that E. lewisii and E. erubescens are sister species. In the hypothesized phylogeny, the 'cinnabarina/cardinalis' pair is sister to the 'lewisii/erubescens' pair.

Erythranthe lewisii is a model system for studying pollinator-based reproductive isolation. E. lewisii is pollinated by bees, primarily Bombus and Osmia, which feed on its nectar and transfer its pollen. Although it is fully interfertile with its sister species E. cardinalis, the two do not interbreed in the wild, a difference ascribed primarily to pollinator differences; E. cardinalis is pollinated by hummingbirds, especially Calypte anna and Selasphorus rufus. It was previously reported that evidence strongly linking pollination preference to color differences between the species, but this has been disproven. E. erubescens is mostly pollinated by Bombus balteatus, B. centralis, B. flavifrons, and B. vosnesenskii.

Erythranthe parishii is also closely related to E. lewisii, but it has evolved in a different direction as a self-pollinated species with small flowers.

E. eastwoodiae, E. nelsonii, E. rupestris, and E. verbenacea are also pollinated by hummingbirds. These four species as well as E. cardinalis and E. nelsonii produce bisexual flowers and are self-compatible. This approximate ratio of insect vs hummingbird pollination holds true for the rest of the genus. There have been two separate transformations to hummingbird pollination. Pollination changes are highly affected by changes in flower morphology. E. cardinalis and its sister species E. cinnabarina likely evolved via allopatric speciation.

Erythranthe guttata is pollinated by bees, such as Bombus impatiens. Inbreeding reduces flower quantity and size and pollen quality and quantity. E. guttata also displays a high degree of self-pollination. Erythranthe nasuta evolved from E. guttata in central California between 200,000 and 500,000 years ago and since then has become primarily a self-pollinator.

== Distribution and habitat ==
Over 80% of Erythranthe species are found in western North America, especially California, Oregon, and Washington. Genus members are also found in Baja California, Alaska, British Columbia, Nevada, Utah, Idaho, Montana, Wyoming, Colorado, Arizona, New Mexico, and to a lesser extent the midwestern states, northeastern states, Canada, and Latin America. Members of this genus are found in eastern Asia; several species of which have a high degree of similarity with some of the species found in North and South America.

A large number of the species grow in moist to wet soils with some growing even in shallow water. They are not very drought resistant, but the species now classified as Diplacus are. Some species grow in dry areas, others in wet habitats, such as members of the section Simiolus, which are hydrophilic. Both overall plant size and corolla size vary greatly throughout the genus. A minimum of 25 of the species are listed as threatened by the International Union for Conservation of Nature. Species are found at elevations from oceanside to high mountains as well as a wide variety of climates, though most prefer wet areas such as riverbanks.

== Pests and diseases ==
Diplacus, Erythranthe, and Mimulus are subject to a very similar set of pests and diseases. The pests these genera are susceptible to include: gall midges, golden mealybugs, thrips, and seed bugs. Diseases they are susceptible to include: crown gall, aster yellows phytoplasma, impatiens necrotic spot virus (INSV), leaf spots, powdery mildew — especially Erysiphe brunneopunctata and Erysiphe cichoracearum, botrytis blight, pythium root rot, rusts, cucumber mosaic virus (CMV), as well as mineral and nutrient deficiencies.

== Human culture ==
=== Horticulture ===
In horticulture, several species, cultivars and hybrids are used. Because of their wide range and many variations, the most important are those derived from E. gutatta and E. lutea. E. cuprea alone has at least 10 cultivars and hybrids.

=== Culinary uses ===
Erythranthe species tend to concentrate sodium chloride and other salts absorbed from the soils in which they grow in their leaves and stem tissues. Native Americans and early travelers in the American West used this plant as a salt substitute to season wild game. The entire plant is edible, but reported to be very salty and bitter unless well cooked. The juice from the leaves was used as a poultice for mild skin irritations and burns. Leaves can be used in salads and soups; flowers taste best before blooming. E. lutea has been used for cooking in Peru.

=== Alternative medical use ===
Erythranthe has been listed as one of the 38 plants that are used to prepare Bach flower remedies, a kind of alternative medicine promoted for its effect on health. However, according to Cancer Research UK, "there is no scientific evidence to prove that flower remedies can control, cure or prevent any type of disease, including cancer".
