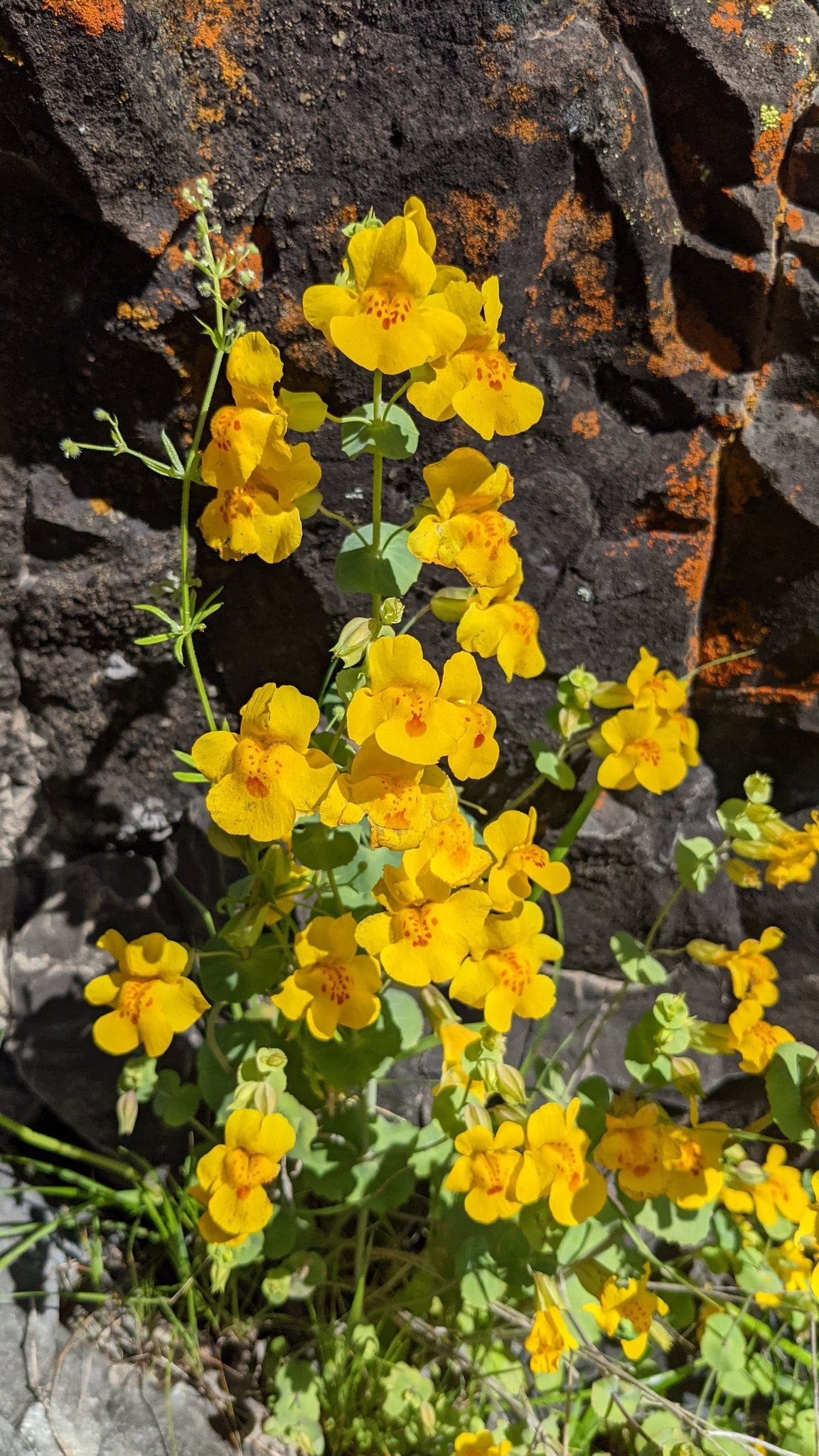
- Butte County, California, 2021

Conservation status
- Vulnerable (NatureServe)

Scientific classification
- Kingdom: Plantae
- Clade: Embryophytes
- Clade: Tracheophytes
- Clade: Angiosperms
- Clade: Eudicots
- Clade: Asterids
- Order: Lamiales
- Family: Phrymaceae
- Genus: Erythranthe
- Species: E. glaucescens

Binomial name
- Erythranthe glaucescens (Greene) G.L.Nesom

Synonyms
- Mimulus glaucescens Greene; Mimulus guttatus var. glaucescens (Greene) Jeps.

= Erythranthe glaucescens =

Species of flowering plant

Erythranthe glaucescens is a species of monkeyflower known by the common name shieldbract monkeyflower. It was formerly known as Mimulus glaucescens.

== Distribution ==
It is endemic to California, where it is known only from the western foothills of the southernmost Cascade Range and adjacent northernmost Sierra Nevada in Butte and Tehama counties. It grows in moist areas, such as seeps, above 600 meters elevation.

== Description ==
Erythranthe glaucescens is an annual herb varying in maximum height from 6 to 80 centimeters. The stem is hairless and waxy. The oval to rounded leaves are up to 7 centimeters long and are sometimes borne on petioles. The inflorescence is a raceme of flowers with a distinctive pair of bracts completely fused around the stem to form a rounded disc up to 4.5 centimeters wide. The flowers are up to 3.5 centimeters long, spreading at the mouth into an upper lip with two notched lobes and a lower lip with three. The flower often has red spotting in the mouth.
