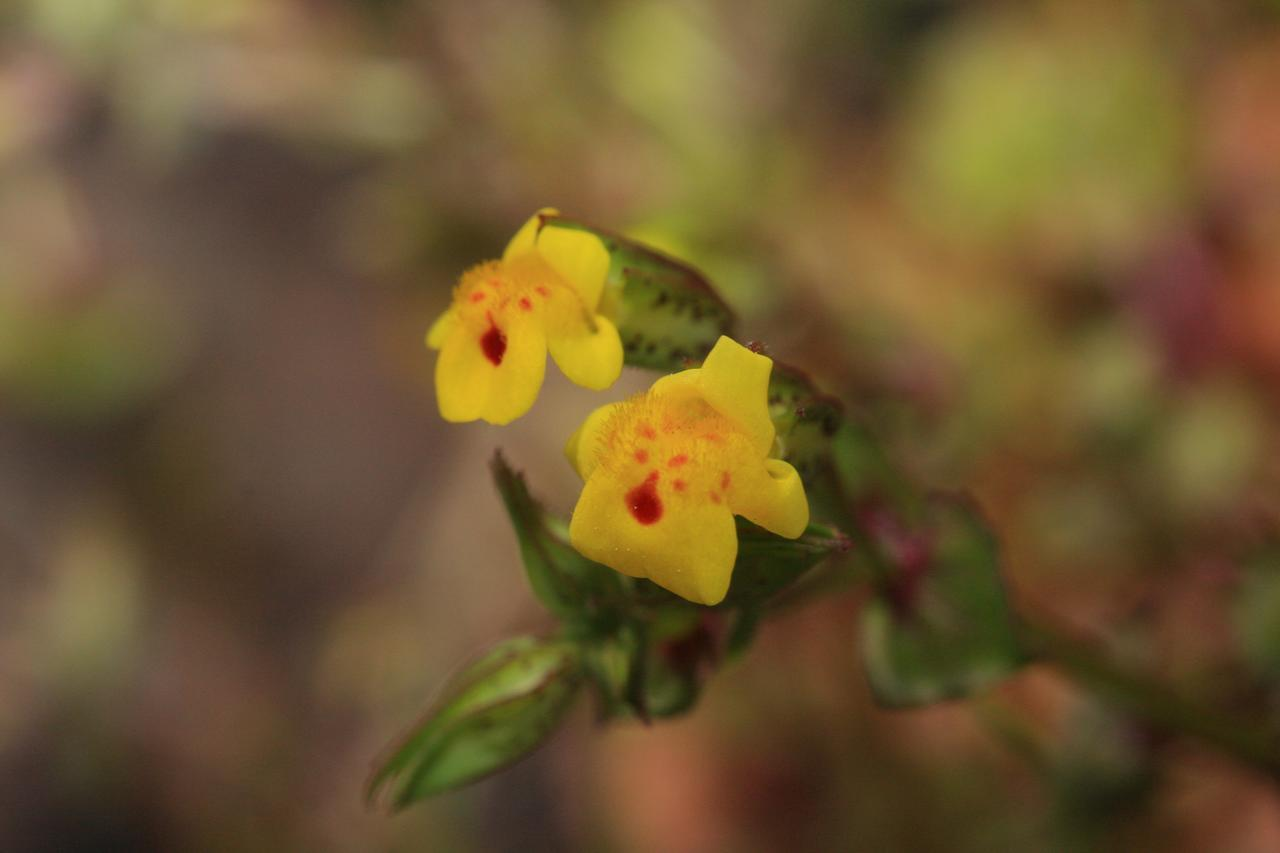

Conservation status
- Apparently Secure (NatureServe)

Scientific classification
- Kingdom: Plantae
- Clade: Embryophytes
- Clade: Tracheophytes
- Clade: Angiosperms
- Clade: Eudicots
- Clade: Asterids
- Order: Lamiales
- Family: Phrymaceae
- Genus: Erythranthe
- Species: E. laciniata

Binomial name
- Erythranthe laciniata (A.Gray) G.L.Nesom

Synonyms
- Mimulus eisenii Kellogg; Mimulus laciniatus A.Gray

= Erythranthe laciniata =

Cutleaf monkeyflower

Species of flowering plant

Erythranthe laciniata, synonym Mimulus laciniatus, is an uncommon species of flowering plant known by the common name cutleaf monkeyflower, it is endemic to the Sierra Nevada in California.

== Description ==
Erythranthe laciniata is an annual herb producing a mostly hairless stem reaching maximum heights between 3 and 38 centimeters. The oppositely arranged leaves are up to 5 centimeters in length and generally oval in shape, though some of them are divided into lobes. The inflorescence is a raceme of several tiny red-spotted yellow flowers each 4 millimeters to 1.5 centimeters long. The tubular base of each flower is encapsulated in a ribbed, reddish calyx of sepals.

== Distribution and habitat ==
Erythranthe laciniata is endemic to the Sierra Nevada in California, where it most often grows in moist areas on granitic soils, within chaparral and lower and upper montane forests from 490 to 2,650 meters elevation.
