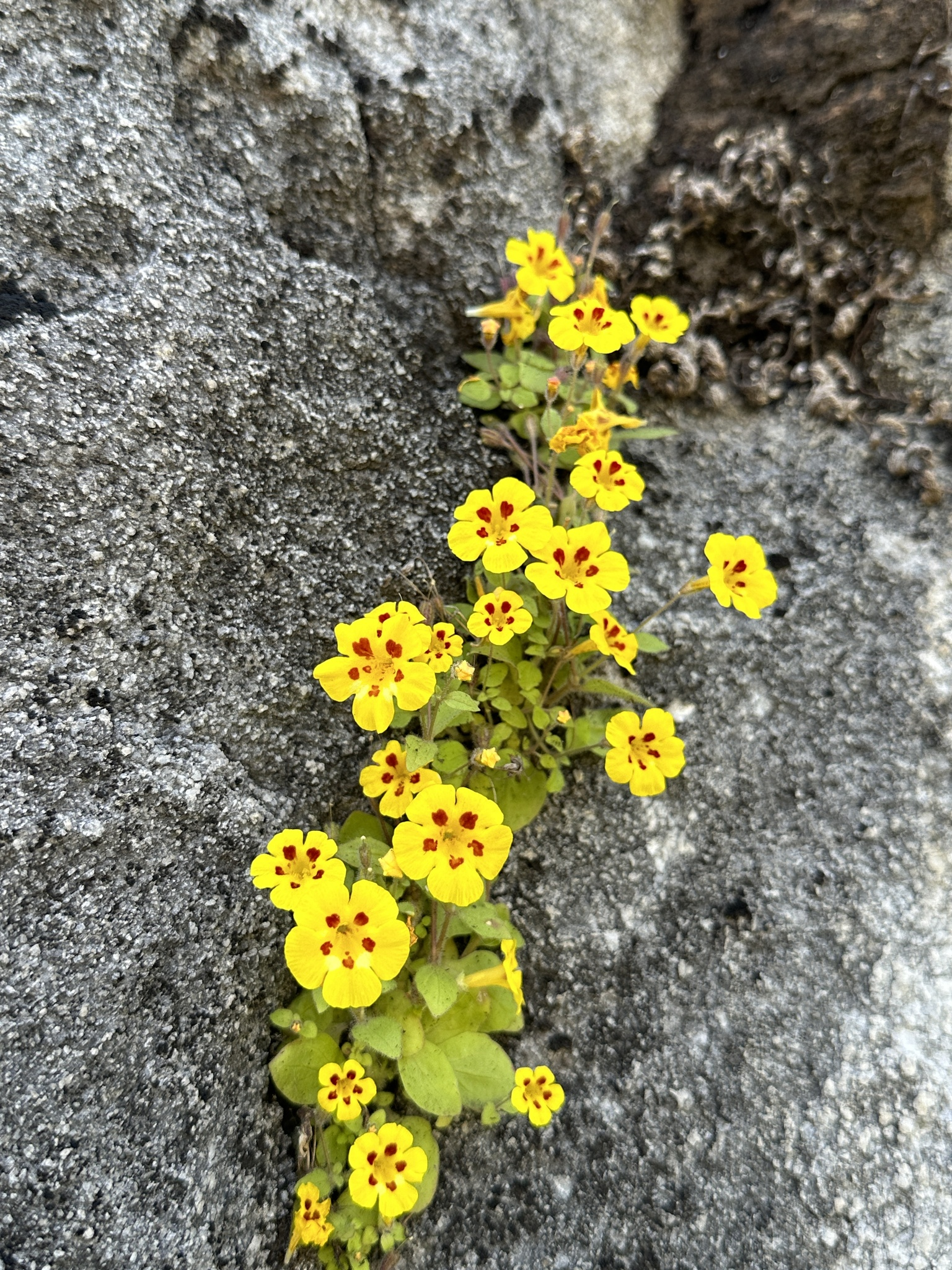
- Tulare County, California, 2023

Conservation status
- Imperiled (NatureServe)

Scientific classification
- Kingdom: Plantae
- Clade: Embryophytes
- Clade: Tracheophytes
- Clade: Angiosperms
- Clade: Eudicots
- Clade: Asterids
- Order: Lamiales
- Family: Phrymaceae
- Genus: Erythranthe
- Species: E. norrisii

Binomial name
- Erythranthe norrisii (Heckard & Shevock) G.L.Nesom, 2012

Synonyms
- Mimulus norrisii Heckard & Shevock

= Erythranthe norrisii =

Species of plant

Erythranthe norrisii, formerly Mimulus norrisii, also known as Kaweah monkeyflower, is a species of flowering plant. Kaweah monkeyflower is endemic to the Kaweah River watershed in the Sierra Nevada of central California and is considered a rare species. Most specimens are known from Sequoia National Park in Tulare County. It is native to the western foothills of the southern Sierra, from 600 to 1,300 meters elevation. According to the Flora of North America Association, Kaweah monkeyflower grows in "steep marble outcrops in soil pockets, moss covered marble and quartzite ledges, cracks, fractures, weathered faces, chamise chaparral or blue oak woodlands."
