= Erythranthe cinnabarina =

Conservation status
- Unranked (NatureServe)

Scientific classification
- Kingdom: Plantae
- Clade: Embryophytes
- Clade: Tracheophytes
- Clade: Angiosperms
- Clade: Eudicots
- Clade: Asterids
- Order: Lamiales
- Family: Phrymaceae
- Genus: Erythranthe
- Species: E. cinnabarina

Binomial name
- Erythranthe cinnabarina G.L.Nesom

Species of flowering plant

Erythranthe cinnabarina, the Arizona big red monkeyflower, is a species of flowering plant native to the sky islands of Arizona.

== Description ==
Erythranthe cinnabarina is a perennial monkey-flower. The stem is glabrous and stands erect between 25 cm to 60 cm. It has flowers that range from orange to deep scarlet.

== Distribution and habitat ==
Erythranthe cinnabarina is only found in the Santa Catalina Mountains, the Pinaleno Mountains, and the Chirichahua Mountains of southeastern Arizona. Its habitats include streambeds, canyons, and other riparian zones.

== Taxonomy ==
Erythranthe cinnabarina populations were originally considered to be E. cardinalis until being split into a distinctive species in 2014 based on morphological and genetic analysis.
