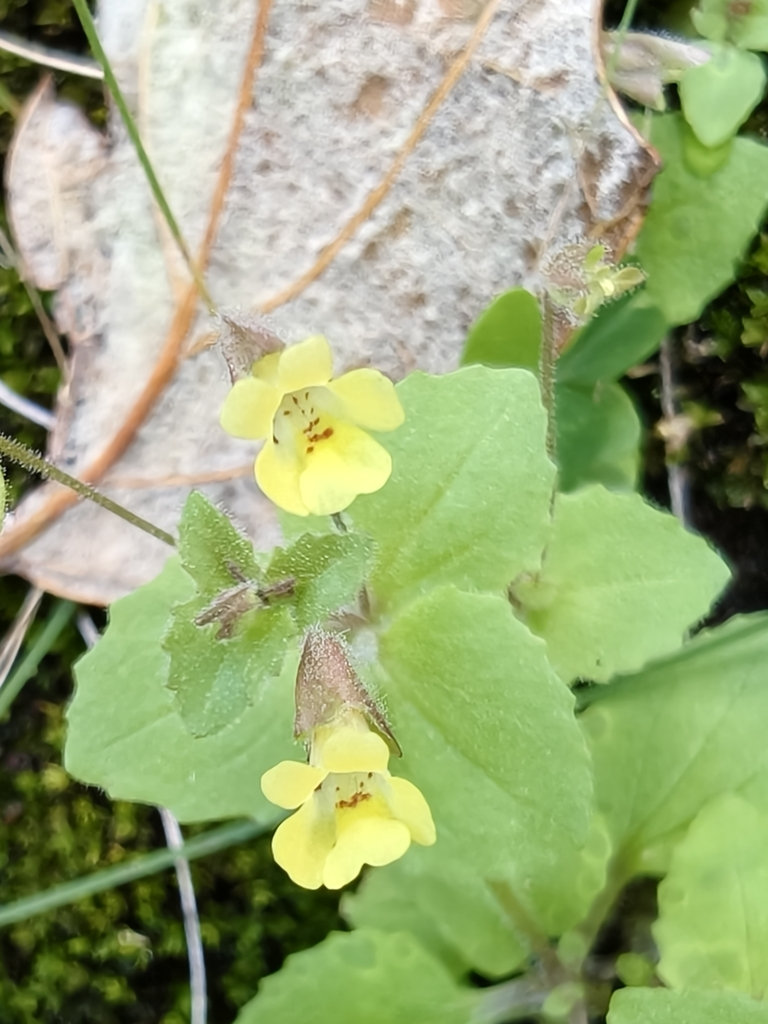
- Erythranthe calciphila in bloom

Conservation status
- Unranked (NatureServe)

Scientific classification
- Kingdom: Plantae
- Clade: Tracheophytes
- Clade: Angiosperms
- Clade: Eudicots
- Clade: Asterids
- Order: Lamiales
- Family: Phrymaceae
- Genus: Erythranthe
- Species: E. calciphila

Binomial name
- Erythranthe calciphila (Gentry) G.L.Nesom

Synonyms
- Mimulus calciphilus Gentry; Mimulus minutiflorus R.K.Vickery

= Erythranthe calciphila =

Species of flowering plant

Erythranthe calciphila, commonly known as the Mexican moss monkeyflower, is a species of flowering plant in the family Phrymaceae. It is a small annual herb native to southeastern Arizona and northern Mexico. It grows in moist, sheltered places beneath rock ledges in desert and dry shrubland.
