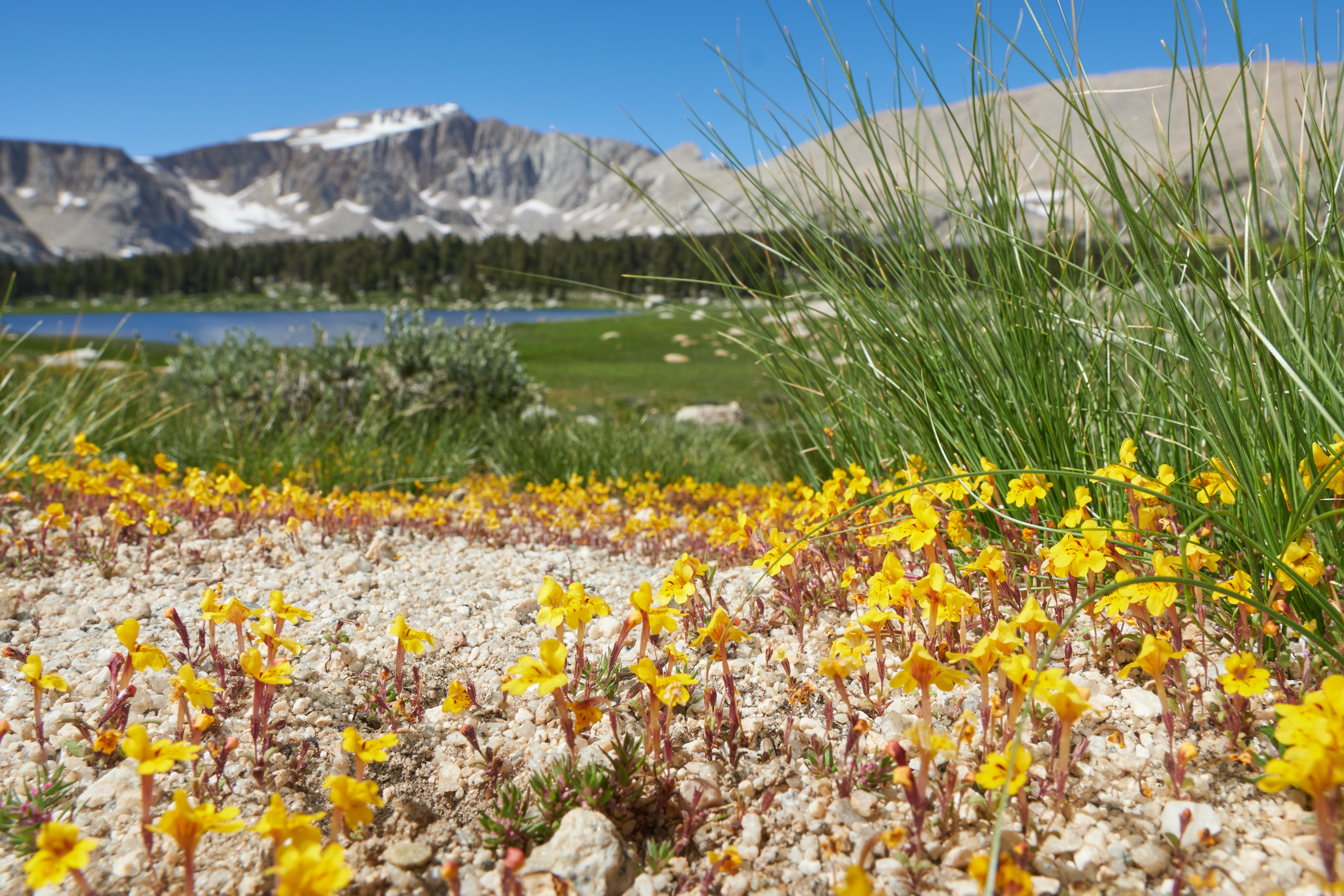
- A meadow full of blooming yellow-morph E. barbata in the southern Sierra Nevada, 3350m elevation

Conservation status
- Vulnerable (NatureServe)

Scientific classification
- Kingdom: Plantae
- Clade: Embryophytes
- Clade: Tracheophytes
- Clade: Angiosperms
- Clade: Eudicots
- Clade: Asterids
- Order: Lamiales
- Family: Phrymaceae
- Genus: Erythranthe
- Species: E. barbata

Binomial name
- Erythranthe barbata (Greene) N.S.Fraga (2012)

Synonyms
- Mimulus barbatus Greene (1884); Mimulus deflexus S.Watson

= Erythranthe barbata =

Species of plant

Erythranthe barbata, the bearded monkeyflower, is a species of plant in the lopseed family endemic to the southern Sierra Nevada mountains in the state of California.

== Description ==
Erythranthe barbata is a small annual wildflower 2-15cm tall. Flowers are solitary. There are two color morphs: a yellow morph with all-yellow flowers, and a bicolor morph where one lip is a dark maroon-purple. Blooming occurs between May and August.

== Distribution and habitat ==
Erythranthe barbata is endemic to moderate-to-high elevations (1800-3400m) of the southern Sierra Nevada mountains, occurring mainly in Tulare county with populations in Inyo and Kern counties. It grows on bare decomposed granite at the edges of meadows as well as in the understory of conifer forest, sometimes forming large single-species mats.

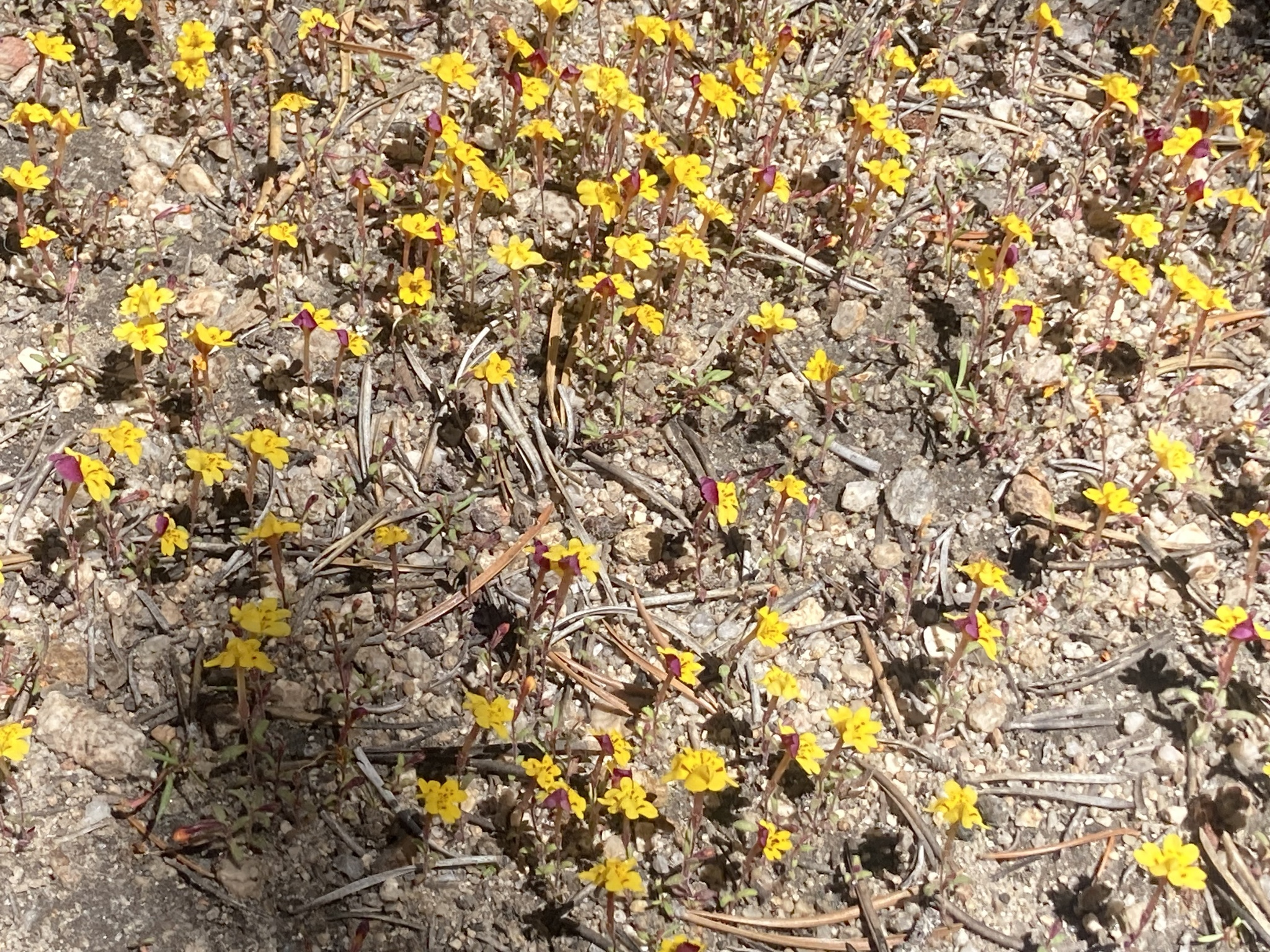
Bicolor-morph E. barbata growing in the understory of a lodgepole-foxtail pine forest
