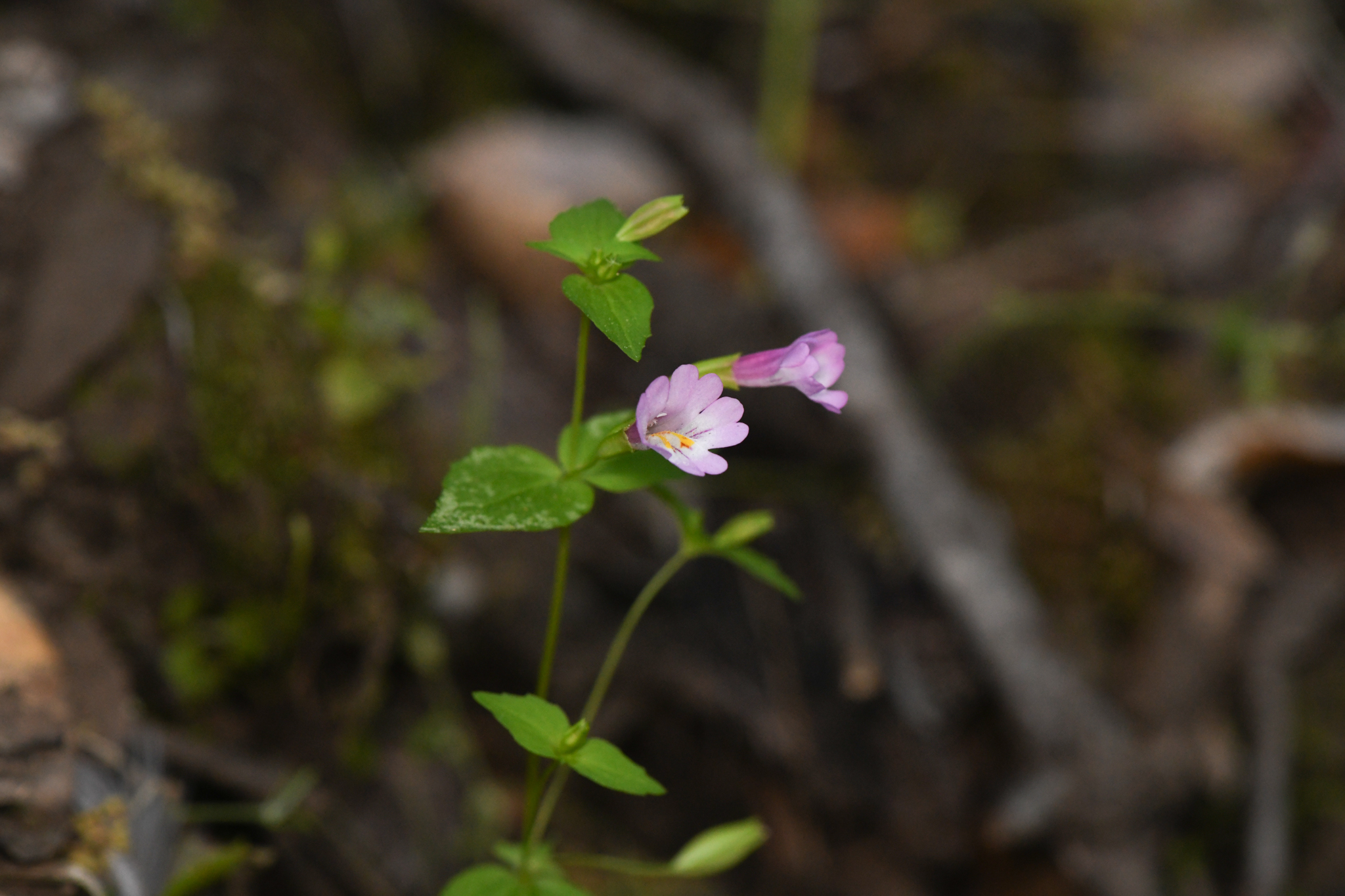
- Yosemite Valley, 2023

Conservation status
- Apparently Secure (NatureServe)

Scientific classification
- Kingdom: Plantae
- Clade: Embryophytes
- Clade: Tracheophytes
- Clade: Angiosperms
- Clade: Eudicots
- Clade: Asterids
- Order: Lamiales
- Family: Phrymaceae
- Genus: Erythranthe
- Species: E. inconspicua

Binomial name
- Erythranthe inconspicua (A.Gray) G.L.Nesom

Synonyms
- Mimulus inconspicuus A.Gray

= Erythranthe inconspicua =

Species of flowering plant

Erythranthe inconspicua, synonym Mimulus inconspicuus, is an uncommon species of monkeyflower known by the common name smallflower monkeyflower.

== Distribution ==
It is endemic to California, where it is known only from the western foothills of the central and southern Sierra Nevada, from El Dorado County south. It grows mainly in moist areas with partial shade from 200 to 2,100 meters elevation.

== Description ==
Erythranthe inconspicua is an annual herb producing a thin but elongated and sometimes branching stem up to 30 centimeters long. The leaves are oval in shape, the largest ones up to 4 centimeters long and arranged in a basal rosette, and smaller ones located in pairs along the stem. The tubular throat of the flower is encapsulated in a calyx of sepals which swells as the fruits mature. The pink flower is up to about 1.5 centimeters long and wide, its face divided into five notched lobes.
