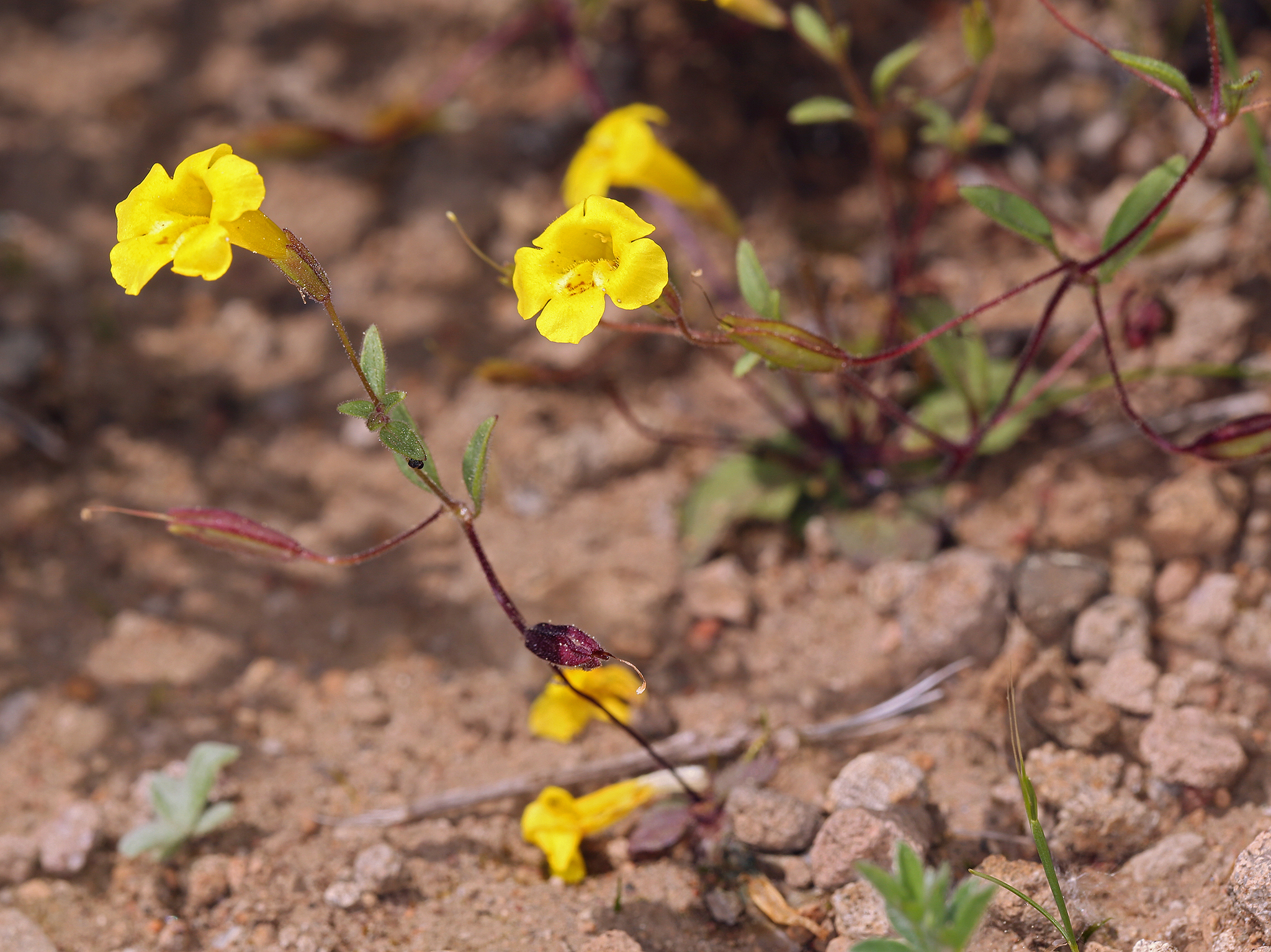
- Nevada County, California, 2016

Conservation status
- Apparently Secure (NatureServe)

Scientific classification
- Kingdom: Plantae
- Clade: Embryophytes
- Clade: Tracheophytes
- Clade: Angiosperms
- Clade: Eudicots
- Clade: Asterids
- Order: Lamiales
- Family: Phrymaceae
- Genus: Erythranthe
- Species: E. pulsiferae

Binomial name
- Erythranthe pulsiferae (A.Gray) G.L.Nesom

Synonyms
- Mimulus pulsiferae A.Gray

= Erythranthe pulsiferae =

Species of flowering plant

Erythranthe pulsiferae is a species of monkeyflower known by the common names candelabrum monkeyflower and Pulsifer's monkeyflower. It was formerly known as Mimulus pulsiferae. It is native to the western United States from Washington to northern California, where it grows in wet habitat such as streambanks. It is an annual herb growing 2 to 21 centimeters tall. The leaves occur in a basal rosette and oppositely along the stem, each on a short petiole and with an oval blade. The tubular base of the flower is encapsulated in a ribbed calyx of sepals with tiny pointed lobes. The flower is roughly a centimeter long and yellow in color, sometimes with red spotting or pink-tinged white coloration in the mouth.
