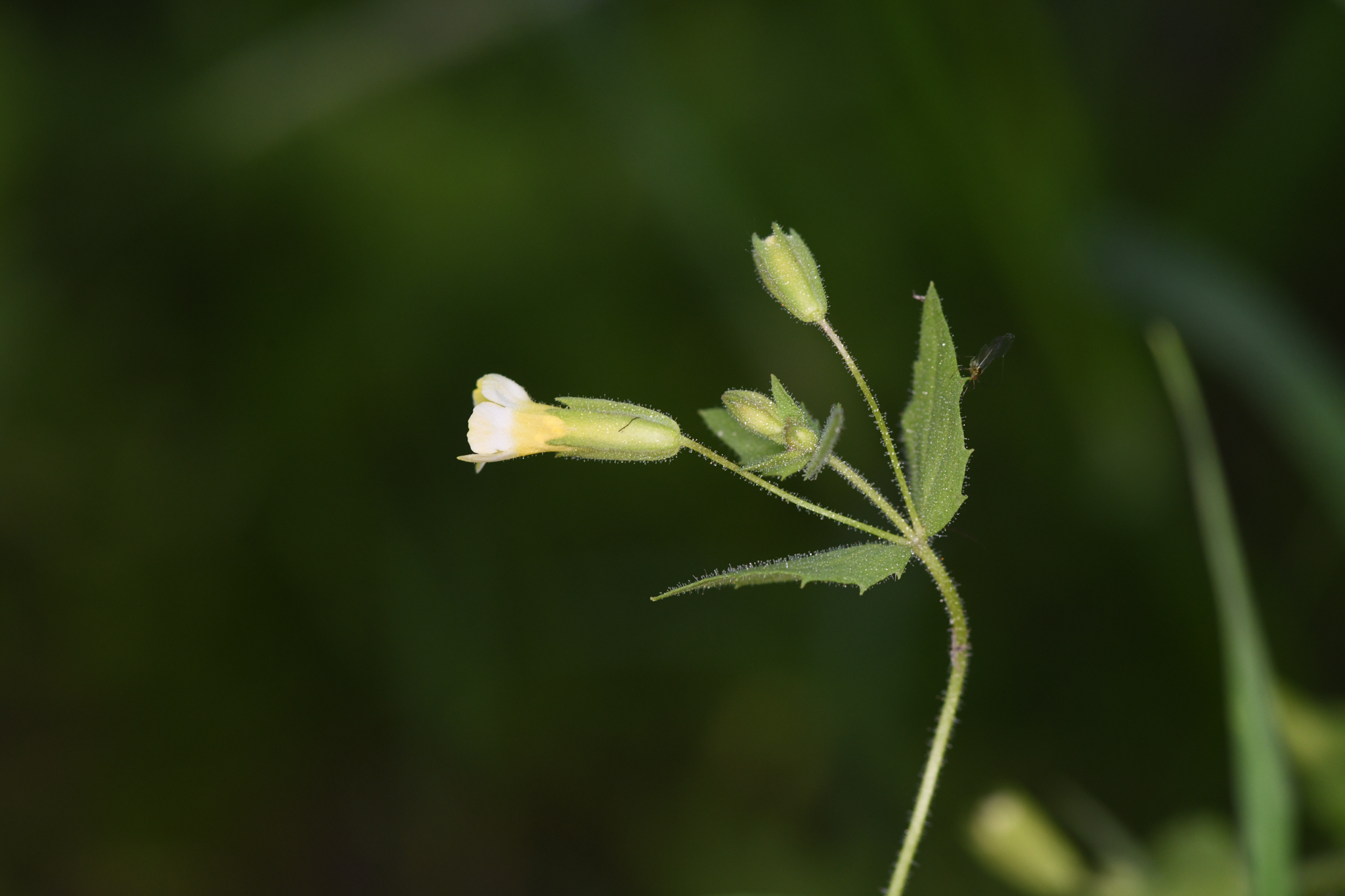

Conservation status
- Apparently Secure (NatureServe)

Scientific classification
- Kingdom: Plantae
- Clade: Embryophytes
- Clade: Tracheophytes
- Clade: Angiosperms
- Clade: Eudicots
- Clade: Asterids
- Order: Lamiales
- Family: Phrymaceae
- Genus: Erythranthe
- Species: E. latidens

Binomial name
- Erythranthe latidens (A.Gray) G.L.Nesom

Synonyms
- Mimulus inconspicuus var. latidens A.Gray; Mimulus latidens (A.Gray) Greene

= Erythranthe latidens =

Species of flowering plant

Erythranthe latidens, synonym Mimulus latidens, is a species of monkeyflower known by the common name broadtooth monkeyflower.

It is native to the valleys and coastal mountains of Oregon, California, and Baja California state in Mexico below 900 meters elevation. It grows in seasonally moist areas, such as vernal pools, typically on clay soils.

== Description ==
Erythranthe latidens is an annual herb producing a thin, branching stem reaching a maximum height near 27 centimeters. The leaves are lance-shaped to oval, with some located in a basal rosette and smaller ones paired along the stem.

The tubular base of each flower is encapsulated in a ribbed calyx of sepals which swells as the fruit matures. The flower is up to a centimeter long, just a few millimeters wide at the mouth, and pink, white, or occasionally yellow in color.
