= Samuel Bonsall Parish =

American botanist (1838-1928)

Samuel Bonsall Parish (1838–1928) was a California botanist and curator of the herbarium at Stanford University. A number of plants were named in his honor, including Allium parishii, Atriplex parishii, Boechera parishii, Chaenactis parishii, Cheilanthes parishii, Delphinium parishii ssp. pallidum, Delphinium parishii ssp. parishii, Ericameria parishii, Erigeron parishii, Eriogonum parishii, Eschscholzia parishii, Euphorbia parishii, Galium parishii, Grusonia parishii, Heuchera parishii, Lycium parishii, Malacothamnus parishii, Mimulus parishii, Orobanche parishii ssp. brachyloba, Orobanche parishii ssp. parishii, Perideridia parishii, Phacelia parishii, Plagiobothrys parishii, Puccinellia parishii, Silene parishii, Solanum parishii, Stipa parishii, Symphoricarpos parishii, Tauschia parishii, Trichostema parishii, Viguiera parishii, and others.

After studying at New York University in 1858, he became a professor and then participated for four years at the American Civil War. With his brother, he bought a ranch near San Bernardino in 1872 and studied the flora of southern California. His collection of plants of this region led him to undertake a collaboration with Charles Christopher Parry and C. G. Pringle. He distributed a numbered exsiccata-like specimen series called Selected plants of Southern California. His herbarium was sold to Stanford University in 1917.
