= Wand sage =

Wand sage is a common name for several plants and may refer to:

- Salvia vaseyi, native to the Colorado Desert of North America
- Salvia virgata, native to Asia and southeastern Europe
