= Helianthus nuttallii subsp. parishii =

Conservation status
- Presumed Extinct (NatureServe)

Scientific classification
- Kingdom: Plantae
- Clade: Tracheophytes
- Clade: Angiosperms
- Clade: Eudicots
- Clade: Asterids
- Order: Asterales
- Family: Asteraceae
- Tribe: Heliantheae
- Genus: Helianthus
- Species: H. nuttallii
- Subspecies: H. n. subsp. parishii

Trinomial name
- Helianthus nuttallii subsp. parishii (A.Gray) Heiser

Subspecies of sunflower

Helianthus nuttallii subsp. parishii is a subspecies of the species Helianthus nuttallii in the genus Helianthus, family Asteraceae. It is also known by the common names Los Angeles sunflower and Parish's sunflower. This subspecies has not been seen, in the wild or in cultivation, since 1937.

== Description ==
- Stems: Range from glabrous (smooth) to tomentose (furry).
- Leaves: Leaf arrangement is alternate. Upper leaf surfaces are hairy and rough or tomentose, while the lower leaf surfaces are more or less finely tomentose.
- Inflorescences: Variable number of flowers are borne in round or flat-topped clusters. Peduncles (flower stalks) and phyllaries (involucral bracts) are densely hairy. Flowers from August–October.
  - Ray Florets: Typically 12-21 ray florets per capitulum. Individual ray florets measure between 15-25mm in length.
  - Disc Florets: Corollas measure 5-7mm, with yellow lobes.
- Fruits: Fruits measure 3-4mm in length, with a pappus scales 3-4mm, sometimes less.

== Habitat and distribution ==
Inhabits marshy areas less than 500 m (1,640 ft) above sea level in central western and southwestern California.

== Etymology ==
Helianthus is derived from Greek, meaning 'sun-flower' ('heli' meaning 'sun', and 'anthus', as in 'anther', meaning 'flower'). As the large, yellow-gold heads of many species tend to follow the sun, the Italian-derived 'girare-sole', literally meaning 'turning sun', is also a cognate with 'Jerusalem', as in Jerusalem artichoke.

Nuttallii is named for Thomas Nuttall (1786–1859), a grower of American plants at Rainhill in Lancashire, though he lived in Long Preston in Yorkshire.

Parishii is named for Samuel Bonsall Parish and William Fletcher Parish, California botanists.
