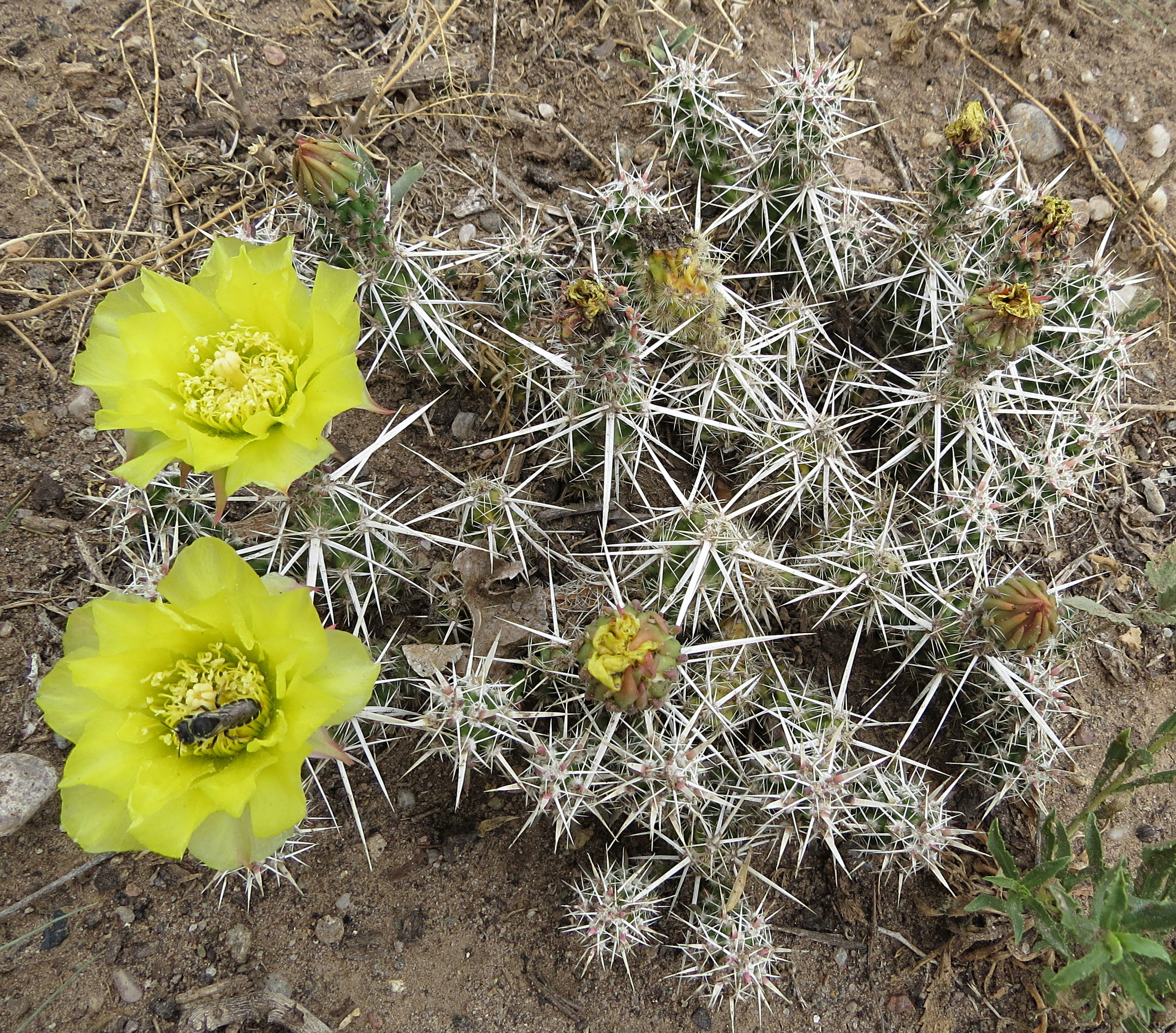

Conservation status
- Least Concern (IUCN 3.1)

Scientific classification
- Kingdom: Plantae
- Clade: Tracheophytes
- Clade: Angiosperms
- Clade: Eudicots
- Order: Caryophyllales
- Family: Cactaceae
- Genus: Grusonia
- Species: G. clavata

Binomial name
- Grusonia clavata (Engelm.) H.Rob.

Synonyms
- Cactus clavatus (Engelm.) Lem.; Corynopuntia clavata (Engelm.) F.M.Knuth; Cylindropuntia clavata (Engelm.) F.M.Knuth; Opuntia clavata Engelm., 1848 (basionym)

= Grusonia clavata =

Species of cactus

Grusonia clavata, the club-cholla, is a species of succulent flowering plant in the genus Grusonia, within the family Cactaceae. It is endemic to central New Mexico, in the southwestern United States.

== Description ==
Spines

Flower

Grusonia clavata is a species of cactus with a short growth form. It forms carpets which are 5-15 cm in height. Its epidermis is bright green, and its root system is made up of fibrous roots. The stems are articulated and are made up of short, club-shaped segments, which narrow significantly at the base. Each segment measures 2.5-7.5 cm in length and 1.5-3 cm in width. This species has ovoid tubercles, on which are situated circular areoles with white or gray woolly trichomes. The glochids, which are light yellow in color and up to 4 mm in length, are situated on the upper parts of the areoles. The leaves are tiny, subulate, and fall off in an early stage of development. The areoles (mainly those near the apices of the segments) have 7-15 slightly-rough spines. Among these are 1-3 upper spines, which are pointed upwards and are white, yellowish, or ochre in color. These are angular-flattened or almost cylindrical in cross-section. Furthermore, there are 3-5 lower spines, which are curved downwards, white in color, and flattened; the largest of these are sword-shaped and measure 1.2-3.5 cm.

The flowers are bright yellow in color and reach 2.5 cm in length. The fruits are barrel-shaped to ellipsoid and yellow in color, with a fleshy texture. They measure 3-4.5 cm in length and 1.5-2.5 cm in width. They do not have spines, although they do have glochids. The seeds are snout-shaped and have a small beak at one end.

== Distribution and habitat ==
Grusonia clavata is native to central New Mexico, in the southwestern United States. It grows primarily in deserts and dry shrublands, as well as grasslands. It is able to adapt to the arid conditions and soils found in these ecosystems.

== Taxonomy ==
Grusonia clavata was first described as Opuntia clavata, a name published in 1848 by the German-American botanist George Engelmann in his book Memoir of a Tour to Northern Mexico: connected with Col. Doniphan's Expedition: 95.

Later, the American botanist Harold Ernest Robinson transferred this species to the genus Grusonia, renaming it Grusonia clavata. He registered these changes in the scientific journal Phytologia 26: 176, published in 1973.

Etymology

- Grusonia: the genus name honors the German businessman and cactus collector Hermann Gruson (1821-1895).
- clavata: the specific epithet is derived from the Latin word clāvātus (meaning "club-shaped"); this refers to the club-shaped segments of this species' stems.

== Conservation status ==
On the IUCN Red List, Grusonia clavata is classified as being Least Concern (LC), signifying that this species has a relatively wide geographic distribution and that its populations have currently not experienced a significant decline on a global scale. Therefore, it is not considered to be at immediate risk of extinction.

Although in certain areas the use of fire for the expansion of livestock grazing land may threaten populations of Grusonia clavata, there are generally no known significant threats to the survival of the species.

== Cultivation ==
Grusonia clavata is cultivated primarily as an ornamental. It may be propagated vegetatively via cuttings. Additionally, the stems are used for medicinal purposes.

== Gallery ==
Plant in Socorro, New Mexico, United States

Stems and spines

Flower bud

Plant in flower

Plant with developing fruits
