= Grusonia aggeria =

Conservation status
- Least Concern (IUCN 3.1)

Scientific classification
- Kingdom: Plantae
- Clade: Tracheophytes
- Clade: Angiosperms
- Clade: Eudicots
- Order: Caryophyllales
- Family: Cactaceae
- Genus: Grusonia
- Species: G. aggeria

Binomial name
- Grusonia aggeria (Ralston & Hilsenb.) E.F.Anderson

Synonyms
- Corynopuntia aggeria (Ralston & Hilsenb.) M.P.Griff.; Opuntia aggeria Ralston & Hilsenb. (basionym)

Species of cactus

Grusonia aggeria, commonly known as the Big Bend club-cholla, is a species of succulent flowering plant in the genus Grusonia, within the family Cactaceae. It is native to the southern United States and northern Mexico.

== Description ==
Grusonia aggeria is a species of low-growing cactus which forms compact clusters, which measure 3 to 9 cm in height. The stems are articulated and are made up of short, cylindrical or club-shaped segments, each of which measures 3.5 to 9 cm in length and 1.5 to 3 cm in diameter.

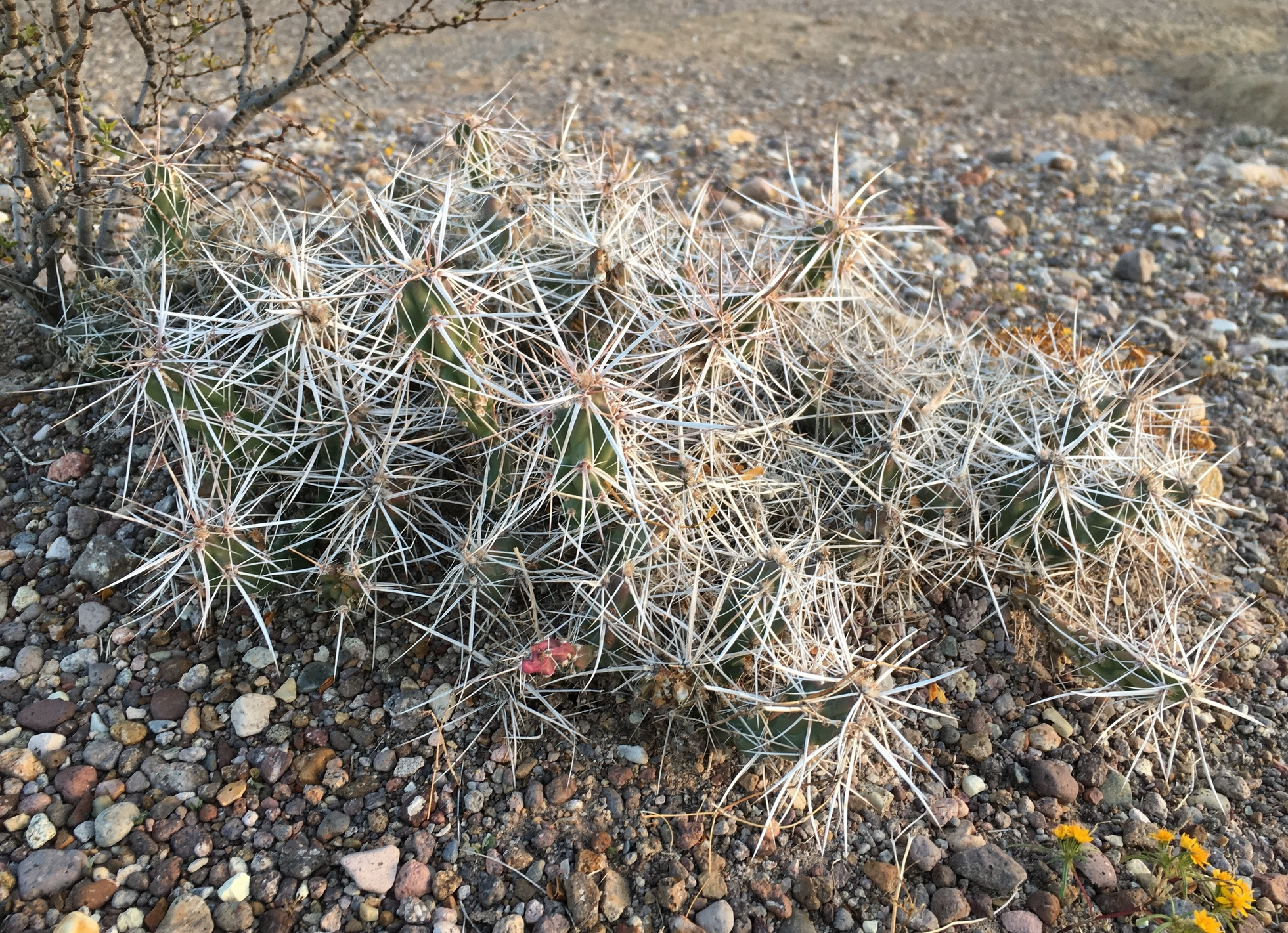
Growth form

Situated on the stems are areoles with yellow glochids that measure up to 5 mm in length. There are also 5 to 15 spines, although there may occasionally be only 1. The spines are mainly found on the areoles closer to the apices of the stems; they reach 3 to 5 cm in length. The ≤5 central spines are red-brown to gray in color, pointed upward or outwards, and cylindrical in cross-section. They are bulbous at the base. The radial spines are chalk-white in color, curved downwards, and flattened, twisted, or arched.

Flower

The flowers are light yellow in color and reach up to 2.5 cm in length. The fruits are dry, cylindrical to ellipsoid, 2 to 2.5 cm in length (or more), and spineless (although glochids are present).

== Distribution and habitat ==
Grusonia aggeria is native to the southern United States (specifically, in southwestern Texas) and northern Mexico. In the US, it is primarily found in and around Big Bend National Park, within southeastern Presidio County and southern Brewster County. In Mexico, it is found in desert areas in Coahuila and eastern Chihuahua.

This species mainly inhabits desert and dry shrubland biomes at altitudes from 549 to 1067 meters above sea level. It grows in loose igneous or calcareous alluvial desert soils, generally in flat areas or on gentle slopes characteristic of dry shrubland.

== Taxonomy ==
This species was first described as Opuntia aggeria, a name published in 1990 by the botanists Barbara E. Ralston and Richard A. Hilsenbeck in the scientific journal Madroño 36: 226.

Later, the American botanist Edward Frederick Anderson transferred the species to the genus Grusonia, renaming it Grusonia aggeria. He published these changes in the scientific journal Cactus and Succulent Journal 71: 325, published in 1999.

Etymology

- Grusonia: the genus name honors the German businessman and cactus collector Hermann Gruson (1821–1895).
- aggeria: the specific epithet is derived from the Latin word aggĕr (meaning "mound") and the suffix -ĭus (meaning "made of"), in reference to the mound-like growth form of this species.

== Conservation status ==
On the IUCN Red List, Grusonia aggeria is classified as being of Least Concern (LC), signifying that the species has a relatively wide distribution and that, currently, its populations have not undergone a significant decline on a global scale. Furthermore, there are no known important specific threats to the species' survival.

== Cultivation ==
This species is cultivated primarily as an ornamental. It is propagated mainly via cuttings.

== Gallery ==
In habitat in Brewster County, Texas, USA

Low growth form

Stems

Plant in flower

Developing fruits
