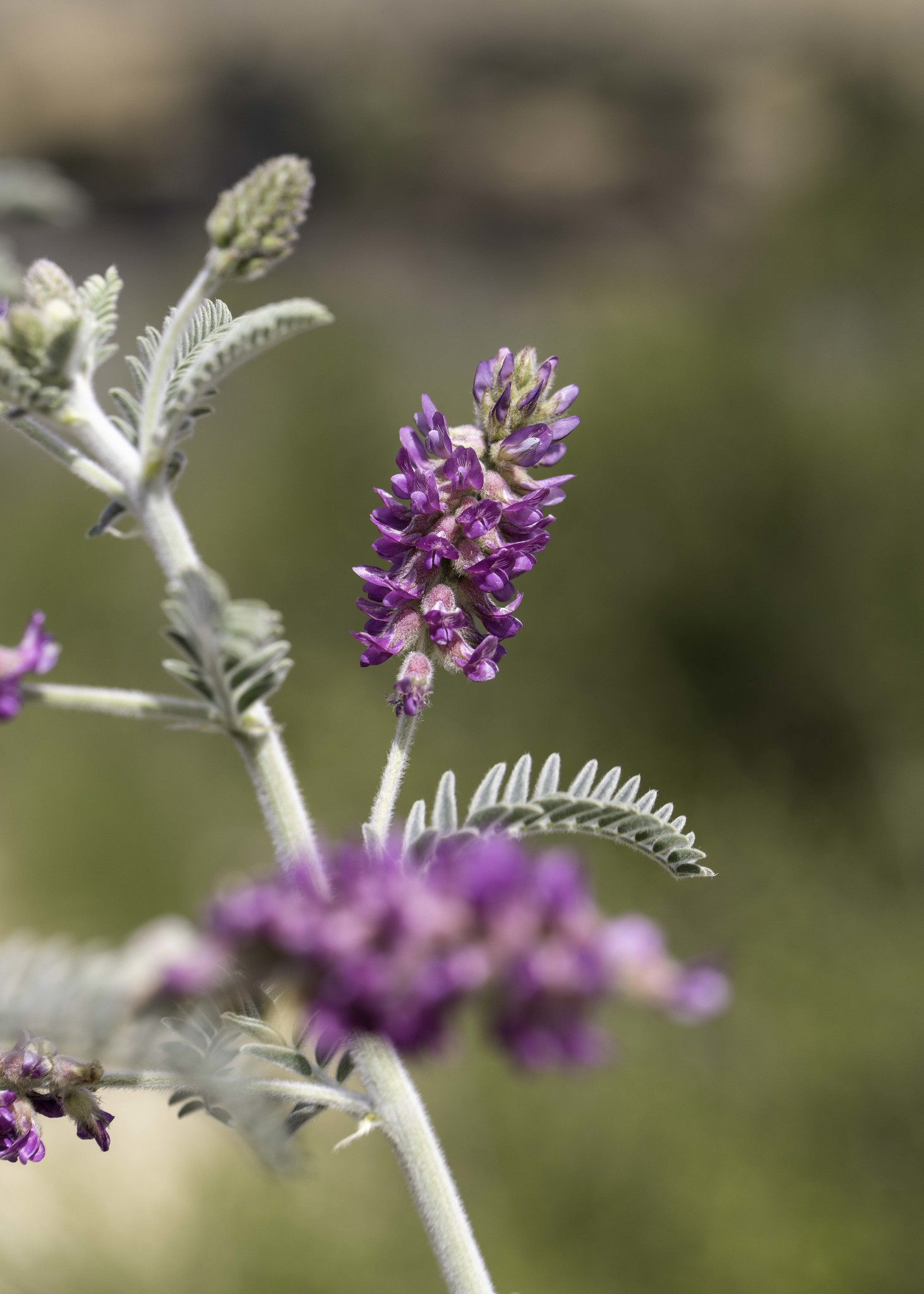

Conservation status
- Endangered (ESA)

Scientific classification
- Kingdom: Plantae
- Clade: Embryophytes
- Clade: Tracheophytes
- Clade: Spermatophytes
- Clade: Angiosperms
- Clade: Eudicots
- Clade: Rosids
- Order: Fabales
- Family: Fabaceae
- Subfamily: Faboideae
- Genus: Astragalus
- Species: A. brauntonii

Binomial name
- Astragalus brauntonii Parish, 1903

= Astragalus brauntonii =

Braunton's milkvetch

Species of legume

Astragalus brauntonii is a rare species of milkvetch known by the common name Braunton's milkvetch. It is a short-lived perennial shrub with lilac flowers that is typically found on carbonate soils in fire-prone areas. It is an opportunistic pioneer species that usually appears in the aftermath of wildfires and other disturbances. It is known from fewer than 20 extant occurrences in the hills and mountains surrounding the Los Angeles Basin in Southern California, as well as an isolated population in northern Baja California.

Altered fire cycles, urban development, and habitat fragmentation all pose threats to the survival of the species. It is a federally listed endangered species in the United States.

== Description ==
Braunton's milkvetch is a large perennial herb which grows from a woody caudex and reaches up to 1.5 m (4.9 ft) tall. The thick hollow stems are coated in coarse white hairs. Leaves are up to 16 cm (6.3 in) long and are made up of many pairs of oval-shaped leaflike leaflets.

The inflorescence is a dense spike of up to 60 bright lilac flowers. Each pealike flower is about a centimeter long with a reflexed hood. The flowers wither and turn brown but remain on the plant instead of dropping off. The plant is pollinated by native Megachile bees and native bumble bees (i.e. Bombus sp.).

The fruit is a small bent legume pod.

== Taxonomy ==
Astragalus brauntonii was described by Samuel Bonsall Parish in the Bulletin of the Southern California Academy of Sciences in 1903. It was first discovered by Herman Edward Hasse in 1899, who collected it in "sterile clay soil" in the Santa Monica Mountains. A later 1902 collection by Hasse served as the type specimen. Parish named the species in honor of Ernest Braunton, an English-American botanist who worked in the Los Angeles area.

A new variety endemic to Baja California was described in 2022. It was discovered in the vicinity of Tijuana during a cross-border BioBlitz by Mexican and American naturalists. The variety is named lativexillum in reference to the much wider banner petal compared to var. brauntonii. It is further distinguished by its shorter peduncles and reduced number of flowers per raceme.

There are two described varieties of Astragalus brauntonii:

- Astragalus brauntonii brauntonii: Southern California (Los Angeles, Orange, and Ventura counties)
- Astragalus brauntonii lativexillum: Northern Baja California between Tijuana and Rosarito

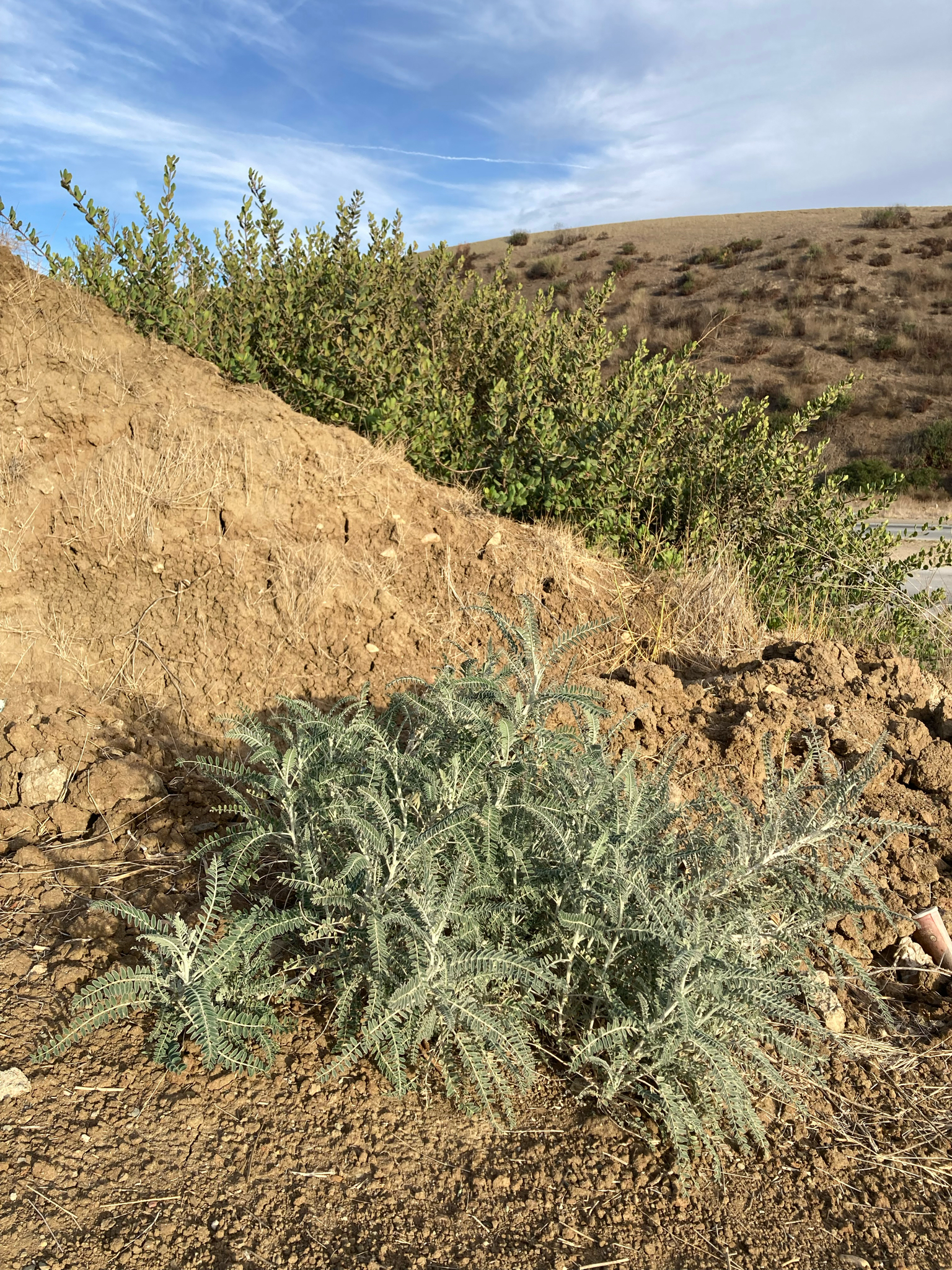
var. lativexillum in Baja California, growing in disturbed soil along a dirt road

== Distribution and habitat ==
Astragalus brauntonii is a plant of the coastal prairie grasslands, coastal sage scrub, and chaparral plant communities of the region. It is often found growing in disturbed areas, especially in carbonate soils areas. The 16 known remaining populations in California are found in the southwestern Transverse Ranges (eastern Santa Monica Mountains, east end Simi Hills, south base San Gabriel Mountains), northern Peninsular Ranges (northwest side Santa Ana Mountains) — within Los Angeles, Orange, and Ventura Counties.

A disjunct population (var. lativexillum) occurs in the coastal hills between Tijuana and Rosarito in extreme northwest Baja California. It occurs almost 240 km to the south of the southernmost populations of var. brauntonii. It grows sympatric with Astragalus tijuanensis.

== Fire ecology ==
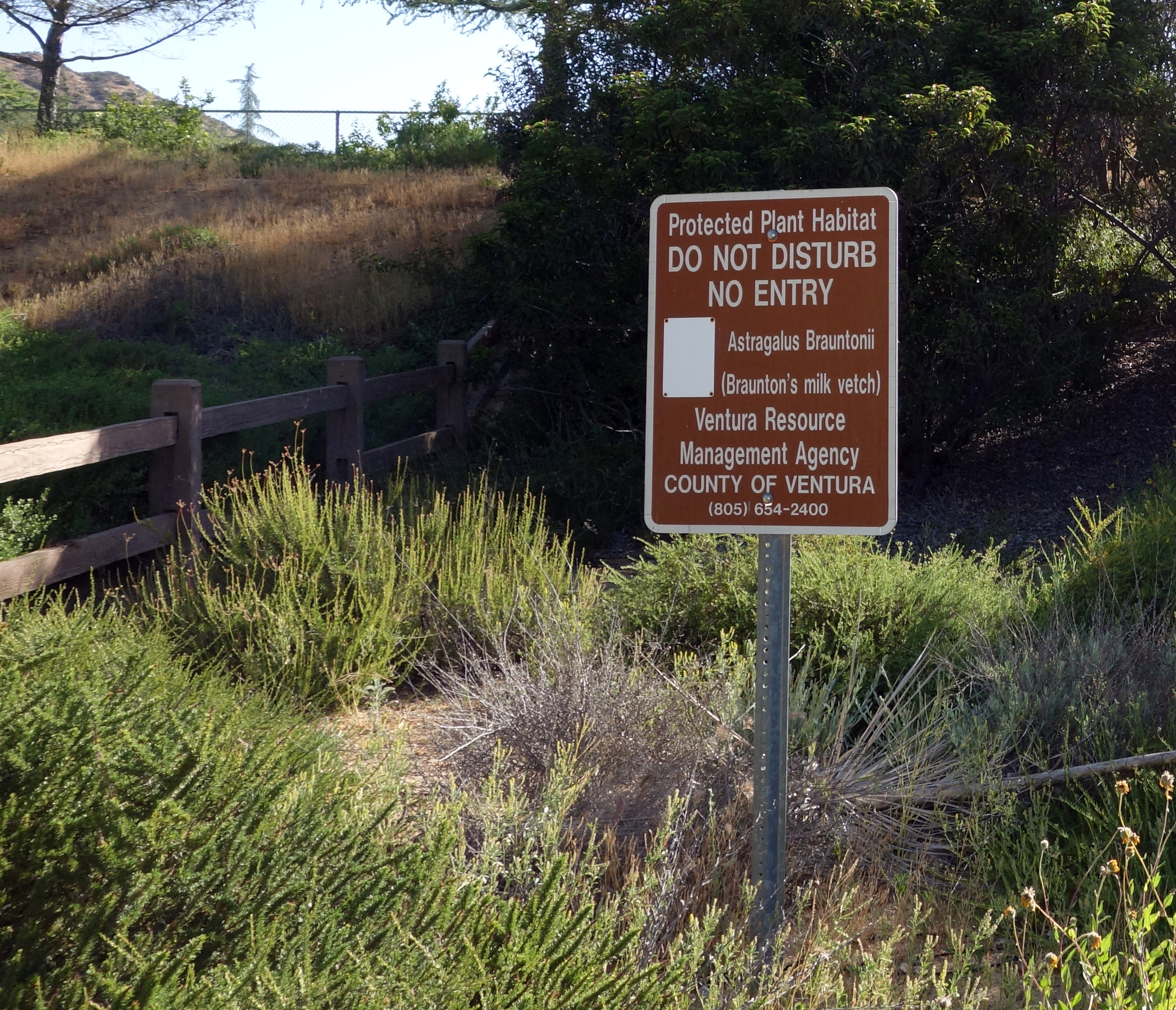
Sign designating a protected area for Braunton's milk-vetch

Astragalus brauntonii is an opportunistic species that relies on disturbance to reproduce, which primarily comes in the form of natural wildfire. Unlike other fire-adapted perennials in the chaparral, it does not resprout from a vegetative underground part, but rather relies on a long-lived dormant seedbank, a trait also seen in another rare perennial legume, Thermopsis macrophylla.

The beanlike seeds require scarification from fire or mechanical disturbance to break down their tough seed coats before they can germinate. The seeds persist for years in the soil until fire or disturbance allows them to sprout, with populations of the plant springing up in an area that has been recently swept by wildfire.

A significant threat to the species is the alteration of natural fire regimes. Natural fire frequencies in Southern California historically occurred in intervals of 50-100 years, compared to the current substantially higher frequency of 15 years or less, despite modern fire suppression. Wildlands in proximity to urban areas suffer from more frequent fires and ignition sources, leading to the conversion of native woody perennial vegetation into landscapes of invasive non-native annual grasses and forbs. The non-native grasslands further the alteration of the fire cycle with their easy ignition and flashier fuels.

Shortened fire cycles create diminished seedbanks as a result of mature plants dying before they can set large numbers of seed. Subsequently, the non-native annuals outcompete the species, reduce critical habitat, and lead to more alteration of the fire cycle.
