= Helianthus nuttallii subsp. nuttallii =

Conservation status
- Secure (NatureServe)

Scientific classification
- Kingdom: Plantae
- Clade: Tracheophytes
- Clade: Angiosperms
- Clade: Eudicots
- Clade: Asterids
- Order: Asterales
- Family: Asteraceae
- Tribe: Heliantheae
- Genus: Helianthus
- Species: H. nuttallii Torr. & A.Gray
- Subspecies: H. n. subsp. nuttallii

Trinomial name
- Helianthus nuttallii subsp. nuttallii

Subspecies of sunflower

Helianthus nuttallii subsp. nuttallii, also known by the common name Nuttall's sunflower is a subspecies of Helianthus nuttallii in the genus Helianthus in the family Asteraceae. is a subspecies of Helianthus nuttallii in the genus Helianthus in the family Asteraceae. It is considered by The Plant List to be a synonym for H. nuttallii. However, The Jepson Manual argues that it is distinct from the species.

== Description ==
- Stems: Range from glabrous (smooth) to scabrous (rough).
- Leaves: Upper leaf surfaces are scabrous, while the undersides of the leaves are covered in short, rough hairs.
- Inflorescences: Flowers from June–October.
  - Peduncle: Glabrous.
  - Involucral bracts: Smooth or covered with short, stiff, adpressed hairs.

== Habitat and distribution ==
Found in moist meadows, streams, and springs from 1,200–1,750 m (3,940–5,740 ft) elevation. Occurs in California in the San Gabriel Mountains, San Bernardino Mountains, Great Basin province, western Mojave Desert, and parts of New Mexico. Populations exist as far north as British Columbia, stretching into eastern Canada.

== Etymology ==
Helianthus is derived from Greek, meaning 'sun-flower' ('heli' meaning 'sun', and 'anthus', as in 'anther', meaning 'flower'). As the large, yellow-gold heads of many species tend to follow the sun, the Italian-derived 'girare-sole', literally meaning 'turning sun', is also a cognate with 'Jerusalem', as in Jerusalem artichoke.

Nuttallii is named for Thomas Nuttall (1786-1859), a grower of American plants at Rainhill in Lancashire, though he lived in Long Preston in Yorkshire.
