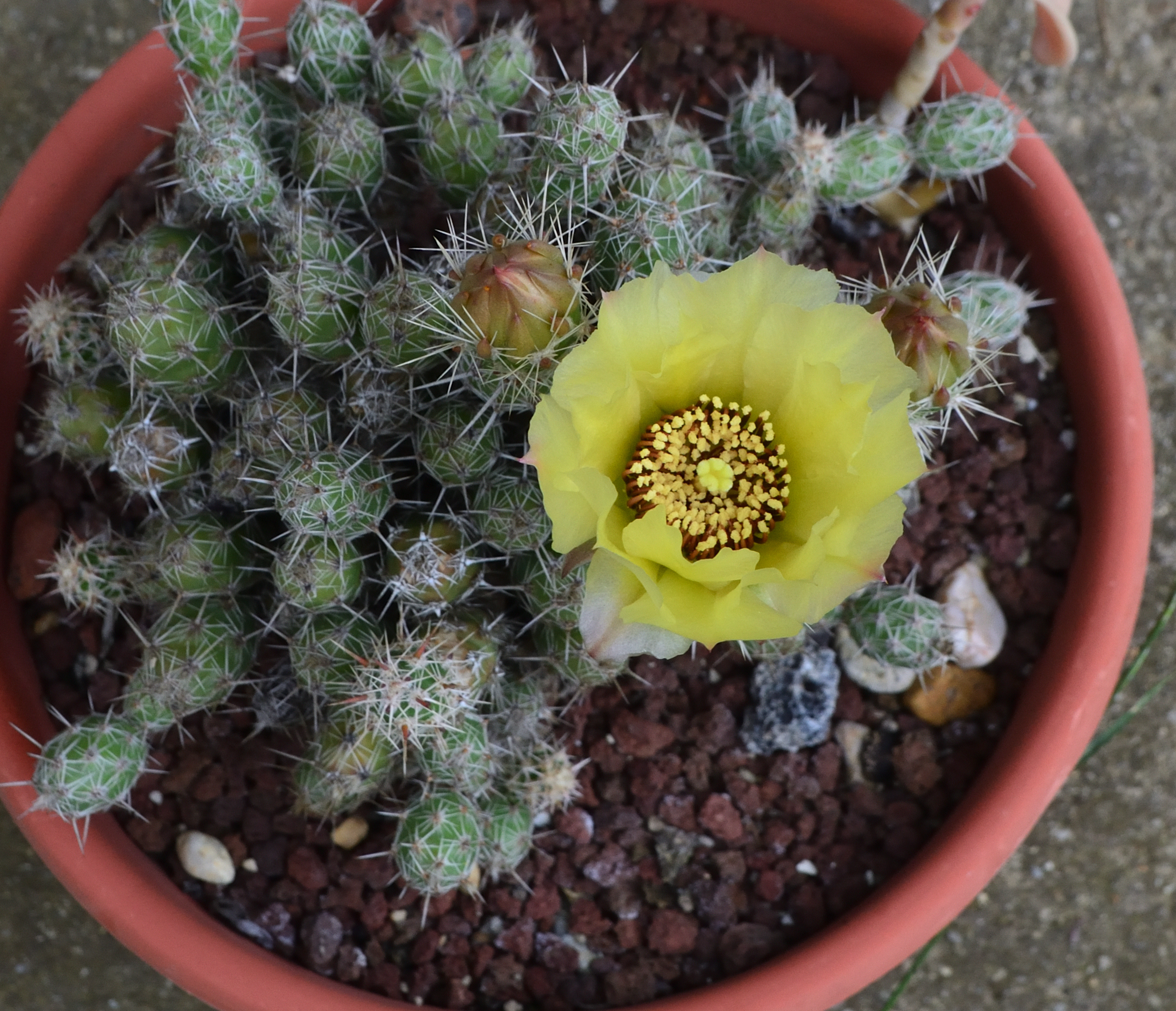

Scientific classification
- Kingdom: Plantae
- Clade: Tracheophytes
- Clade: Angiosperms
- Clade: Eudicots
- Order: Caryophyllales
- Family: Cactaceae
- Genus: Grusonia
- Species: G. bulbispina

Binomial name
- Grusonia bulbispina (Engelm.) H.Rob.

= Grusonia bulbispina =

Species of cactus

Grusonia bulbispina is native to Mexico. It is a member of the family Cactaceae.
