= Fahrpanzer =

German mobile artillery piece

5.3 cm Fahrpanzer
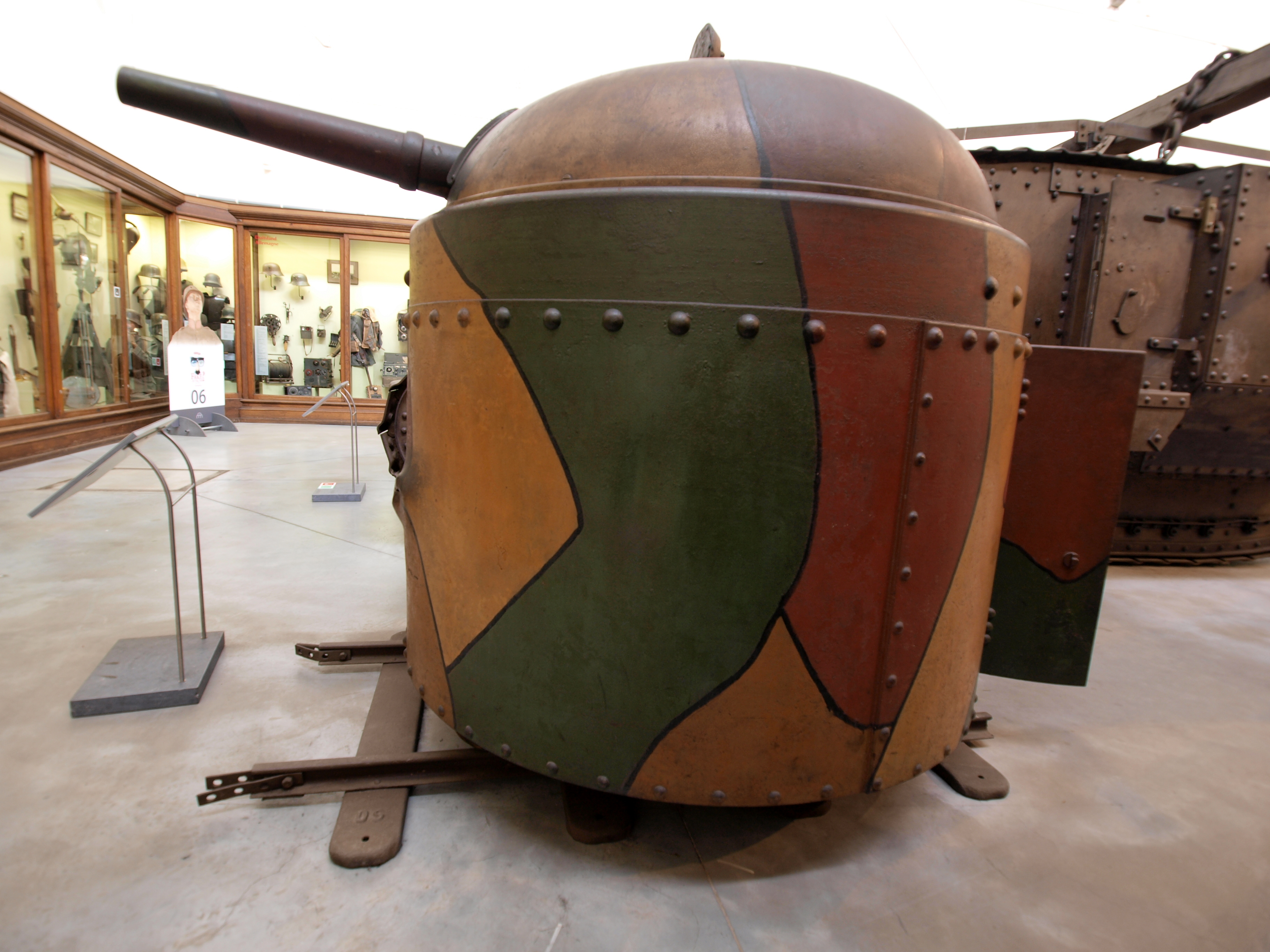
- A German 5.3 cm Fahrpanzer at the Royal Military History Museum, Brussels, Belgium
- Place of origin: German Empire

Service history
- In service: 1892–1945
- Wars: Balkan Wars; World War I

Production history
- Designer: Hermann Gruson
- Designed: 1890
- Manufacturer: H. Gruson Eisengiesserei & Maschinenfabrik Buckau
- Produced: 1892

Specifications
- Mass: Travel: 2,940 kg (6,480 lb); Combat: 2,240 kg (4,940 lb)
- Barrel length: 1.3 m (4 ft 3 in) L/24.5
- Shell: Fixed QF 53 x 176 R
- Shell weight: 1.75 kg (3 lb 14 oz)
- Caliber: 5.3 cm (2.1 in)
- Breech: Falling block action
- Carriage: Horse cart for transport, 60 cm (24 in) military gauge tracks
- Elevation: -10° to +10°
- Traverse: 360°
- Rate of fire: 30–35 rpm
- Muzzle velocity: 495 m/s (1,620 ft/s)
- Maximum firing range: 3 km (2 mi)

5.7 cm Fahrpanzer
- Place of origin: German Empire

Service history
- Wars: Balkan Wars; World War I

Specifications
- Mass: Travel: 3,600 kg (7,900 lb); Combat: 2,550 kg (5,620 lb)
- Barrel length: 1.46 m (4 ft 9 in) L/25.6
- Shell: Fixed QF 57 x 250 R
- Shell weight: 2.7–4 kg (5 lb 15 oz – 8 lb 13 oz)
- Caliber: 5.7 cm (2.2 in)
- Breech: Falling block action
- Carriage: Horse cart for transport, 60 cm rail track on site
- Elevation: -10° to +10°
- Traverse: 360°
- Rate of fire: 30–35 rpm
- Muzzle velocity: 495 m/s (1,620 ft/s)
- Maximum firing range: 5.5 km (3 mi)

The Fahrpanzer was a mobile artillery piece made prior to World War I in Germany, implemented in several German fortifications from 1890 onwards and exported to several foreign military powers prior to the outbreak of hostilities.

== Specifications ==
Beginning in 1878 the German industrialist Hermann Gruson's company located in Magdeburg, Germany specialized in the design and construction of armored gun turrets for fortifications. In 1892 Gruson's company merged with Krupp which greatly increased production capacity and the market for their designs. Gruson works turrets could be found in fortifications in Austria-Hungary, Belgium, Denmark, Germany, and Italy. One of his company's products was the Fahrpanzer, which was a type of mobile armored pillbox.

As designed, the Fahrpanzer was mounted on narrow gauge railroad tracks and was wheeled along 60 cm (24 in) military gauge tracks to its battle station. When not in use it would be pushed into a protective bunker to avoid damage during heavy bombardment. The Fahrpanzer was not autonomous: as originally designed it could only be pushed into place and rearmed from outside. It is not clear whether in practice any Fahrpanzer were retrofitted to be self-propelled or self-reloading. However, artillery pieces of any kind were in short supply during World War I, and many Fahrpanzers were removed from their fortifications and installed in forward trenches by the Germans.

For road transport, the Fahrpanzers had purpose-built horse-drawn carriages. Most export models of the Fahrpanzer were sold with such a carriage, and it appears some export Fahrpanzer remained affixed to their carriages for the duration of their military career. All Fahrpanzer were fully armored and operated by a two-man crew. They may have been positioned and rearmed by the gun crew, or by handlers stationed outside the weapon. In any event, the lack of self-propulsion and self-rearming capability placed its operators at risk. The Fahrpanzer could have benefitted from continued development to equip it with such capabilities, however, the emergence of fully autonomous armored tanks on the battlefield effectively rendered the concept obsolete. A period illustration clearly showing several remote-controlled, machine gun-armed Fahrpanzer engaged in trench warfare does exist, however, no photos or documents exist to suggest the idea ever evolved past the conceptual stage.

== Armament ==
The armament of the Fahrpanzer consisted of one quick-fire gun ranging in size from 37–65 mm (1.5–2.6 in) with the most common sizes being 3.7 cm, 5.3 cm, and 5.7 cm. The Fahrpanzer's guns were capable of +10 degrees and -10 degrees elevation, mounted in a 360-degree rotating turret. The shells were fed from inside by the two-man gun crew, who would be fully protected by the Fahrpanzer's armor until it ran out of ammunition. In practice the firing of the gun destabilized the Fahrpanzer badly, reducing the accuracy of the crew's aim. Since the Fahrpanzer had limited elevation it was a direct fire anti-personnel weapon meant to fire on infantry assaults in the open and the most common types of shells were common, canister and shrapnel. In addition to the Fahrpanzer the Germans also used the 5.3 cm gun in retractable Gruson Works turrets designated the 5 cm SchnellFeuer Kanone in Panzerlafette and a version on a wheeled pedestal mount designated the 5 cm SchnellFeuer Kanone in Kasemattenlafette for use in armored casemates in German frontier fortifications.

Austria-Hungary also produced the 6 cm Fahrpanzer Kanone M98 and the 6 cm Kasemattkanone M98/M99 to arm their fortifications. Despite being designated 6 cm they were actually 5.7 cm guns and the Austro-Hungarian Army designation system just rounded up to the nearest centimeter. The Kingdom of Italy and the Kingdom of Bulgaria also purchased 5.7 cm variants of the Gruson guns. The Bulgarians bought Fahrpanzers while the Italian guns were mounted in retractable turrets such as those at Colle delle Finestre. However, due to a shortage of field artillery, the Royal Italian Army removed a number of guns from fortifications on their western border and placed them on simple two-wheeled box trail carriages for use as infantry support guns under the designation Cannone da 57/25 Gruson.

== Romanian infantry variant ==
Tunul “Gruson”, calibrul 53 mm, model 1887/1916
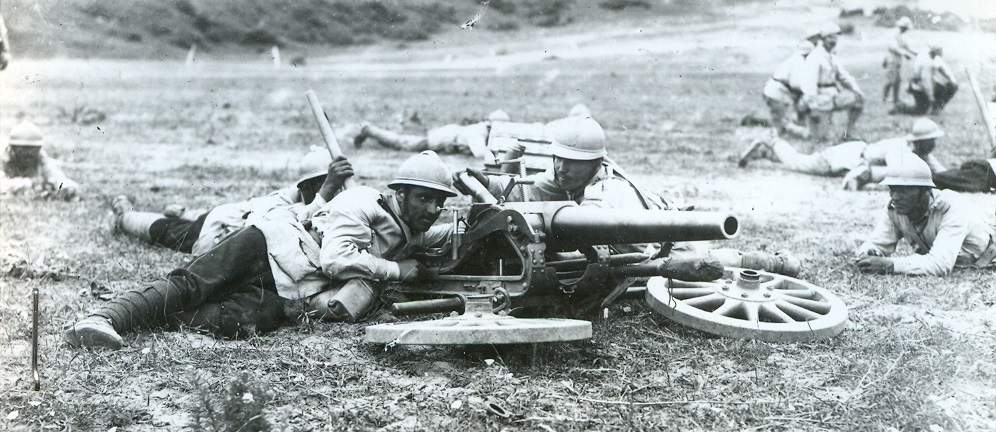
- 53 mm Gruson in infantry gun role in the Romanian Army
- Place of origin: Kingdom of Romania

Service history
- In service: 1916–1919
- Wars: World War I Hungarian–Romanian War
Further information
Production history
Designer	Arsenalul Armatei
Manufacturer	Arsenalul Armatei
No. built	200+
Specifications
Mass	341 kg (752 lb)
Barrel length	1.3 m (4 ft 3 in) L/24.5
Shell	Fixed QF 53 x 176mm R
Shell weight	1.65 kg (3.6 lb)
Caliber	5.3 cm (2.1 in)
Carriage	Box trail
Elevation	-7° to +35°
Traverse	40°
Muzzle velocity	480 m/s (1,600 ft/s)
Maximum firing range	400 m (440 yd)

Romania purchased 334 Gruson Fahrpanzers, in the 53 mm caliber. These were initially deployed on the Siret Line at Focșani (15 batteries, with 6 turrets each), Nămoloasa (24 batteries of 3–5 turrets), Galați (30 batteries of 6 turrets and 10 batteries of 3 turrets) and Brateș (10 turrets). The bridgeheads (not part of that Line) at Cernavodă and Turtucaia were equipped with 28 turrets, and the one at Silistra was equipped with 17 turrets. These guns remained in their emplacements for about twenty years, before being transformed into infantry guns between 1914 and 1916 by mounting them on Romanian-built gun carriages. A few were transformed into anti-aircraft guns.

== Surviving examples ==
The Fahrpanzer on display in the Army Museum in Brussels has long been cited as the only remaining example; however, pictures of restored Fahrpanzers can be found originating from Bulgaria, Greece, Switzerland, France, and South America. There are also numerous Fahrpanzers on display in the Polish Army Museum and Museum of Polish Military Technology, both in Warsaw. There is at least one in Viña del Mar, on the beach near Valparaiso, Chile, at the Naval Gun Museum.

== Users ==
- Austria-Hungary
- Kingdom of Bulgaria - 30
- Chile
- Denmark
- German Empire - 200
- Kingdom of Greece
- Kingdom of Italy
- Kingdom of Romania - 334
- Russian Empire
- Kingdom of Serbia - 4 Captured from Bulgaria during the Balkan Wars
- Switzerland - Unknown exported number, 1 surviving example at Forte Airolo, Switzerland

== Weapons of similar configuration, era, and performance ==
- Tourelle démontable STG - A French machine-gun armed mobile turret from the Second World War.
- 5.7 cm Maxim-Nordenfelt - A British designed and Belgian built gun used in Belgian fortification in Gruson Works turrets and casemates. There was also a shielded infantry gun similar in concept to the Fahrpanzer.

== Photo gallery ==
This image shows the WWI German Gruson Fahrbare Panzerlafette/ Fahrpanzer.

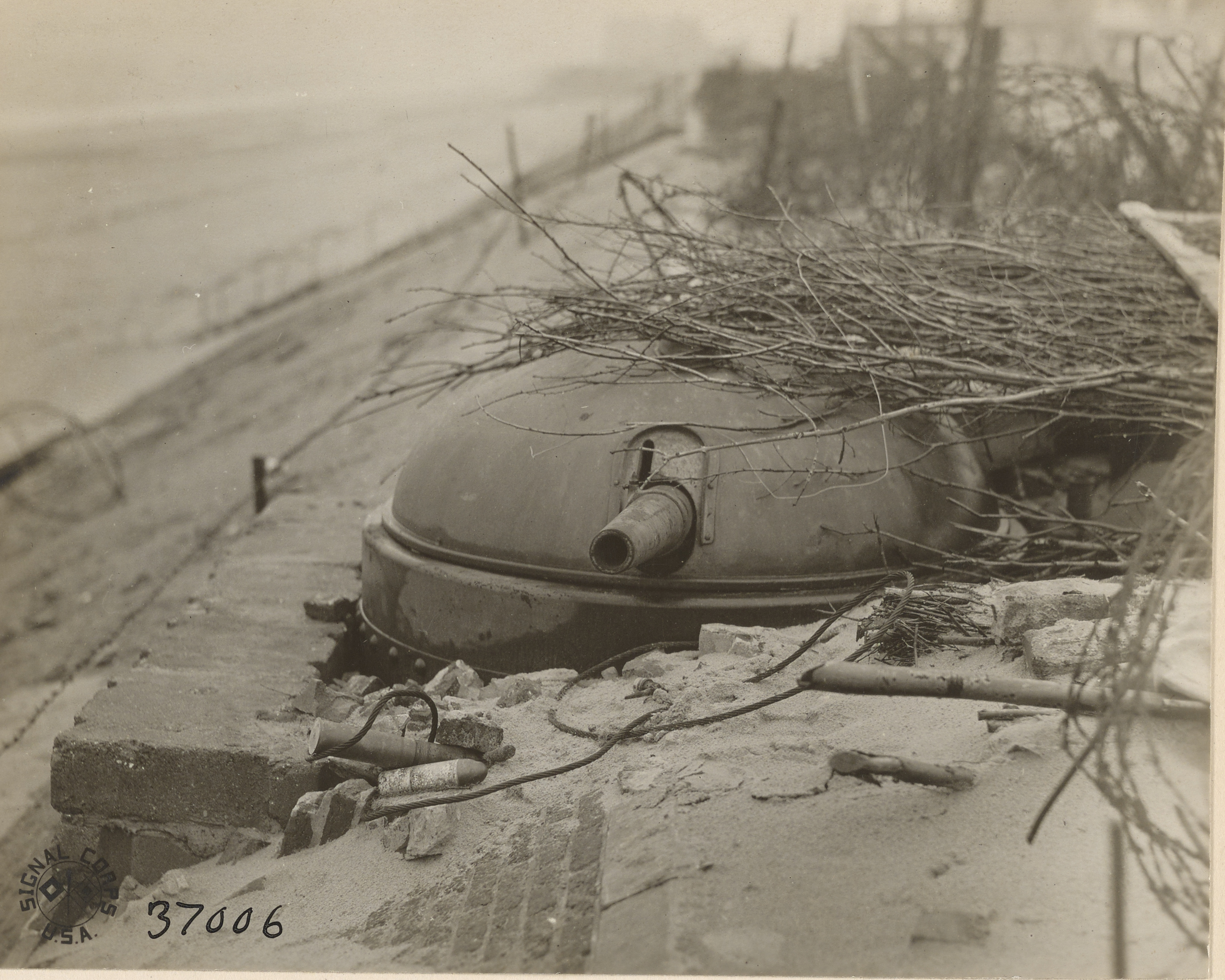
A German gun at Ostende Belgium.

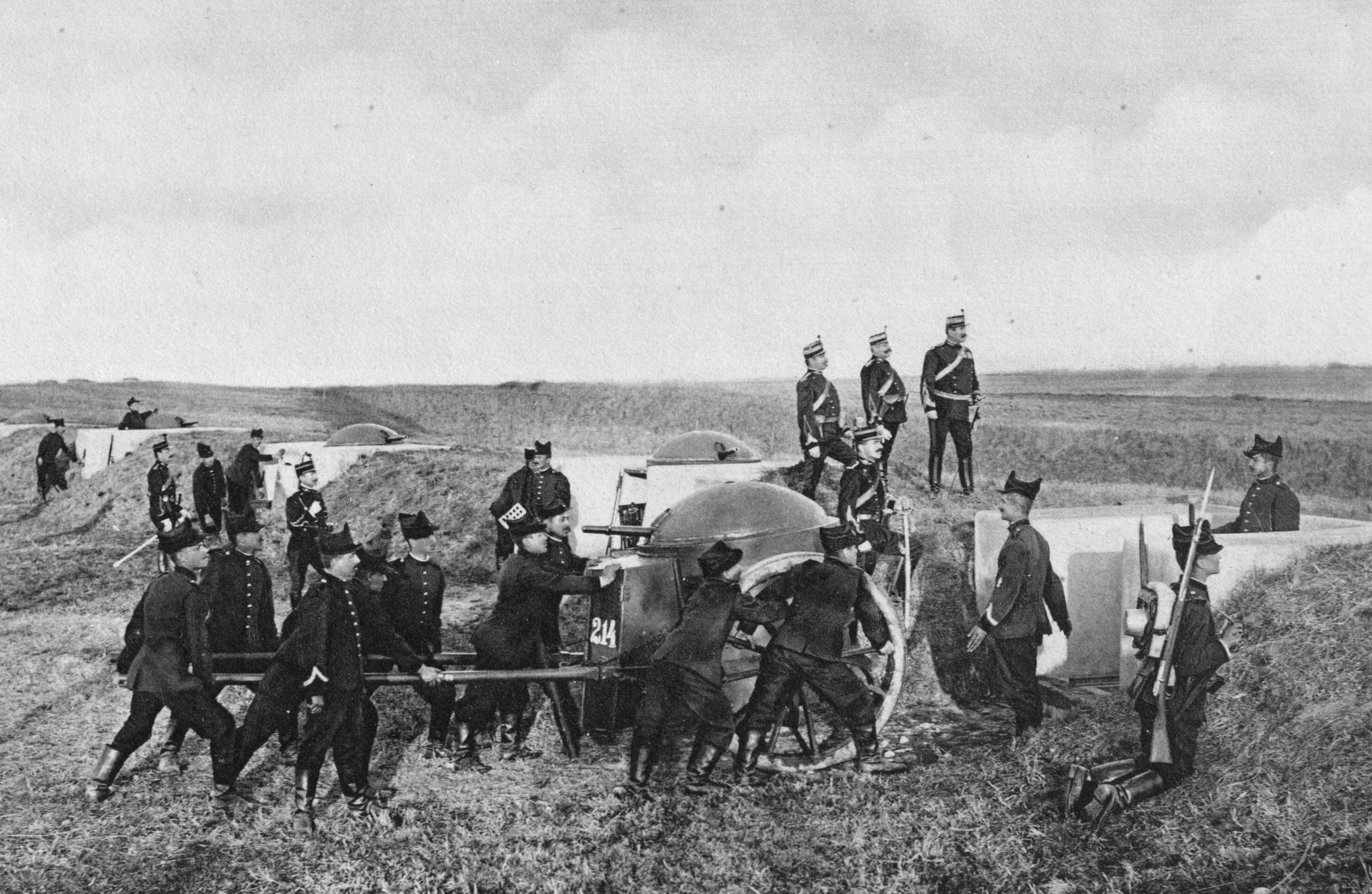
Fahrpanzers on the Siret line in 1902.

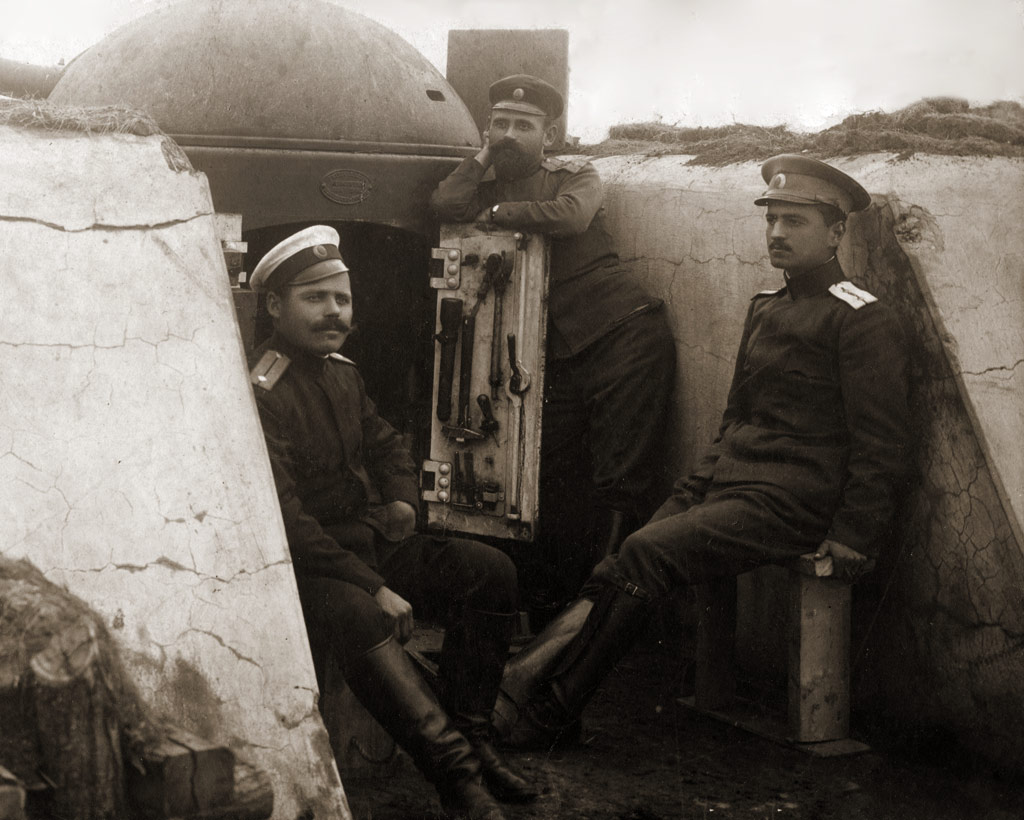
A Bulgarian gun crew.

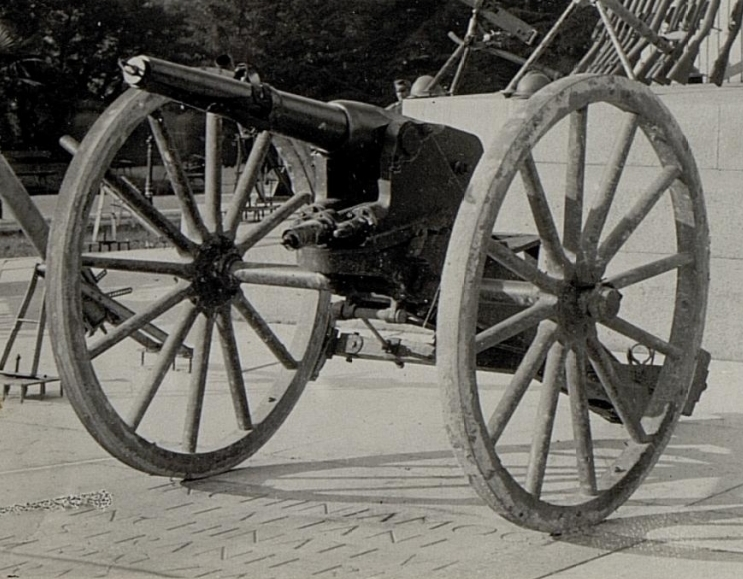
An Italian Cannone da 57/25 Gruson captured by the Austrians.

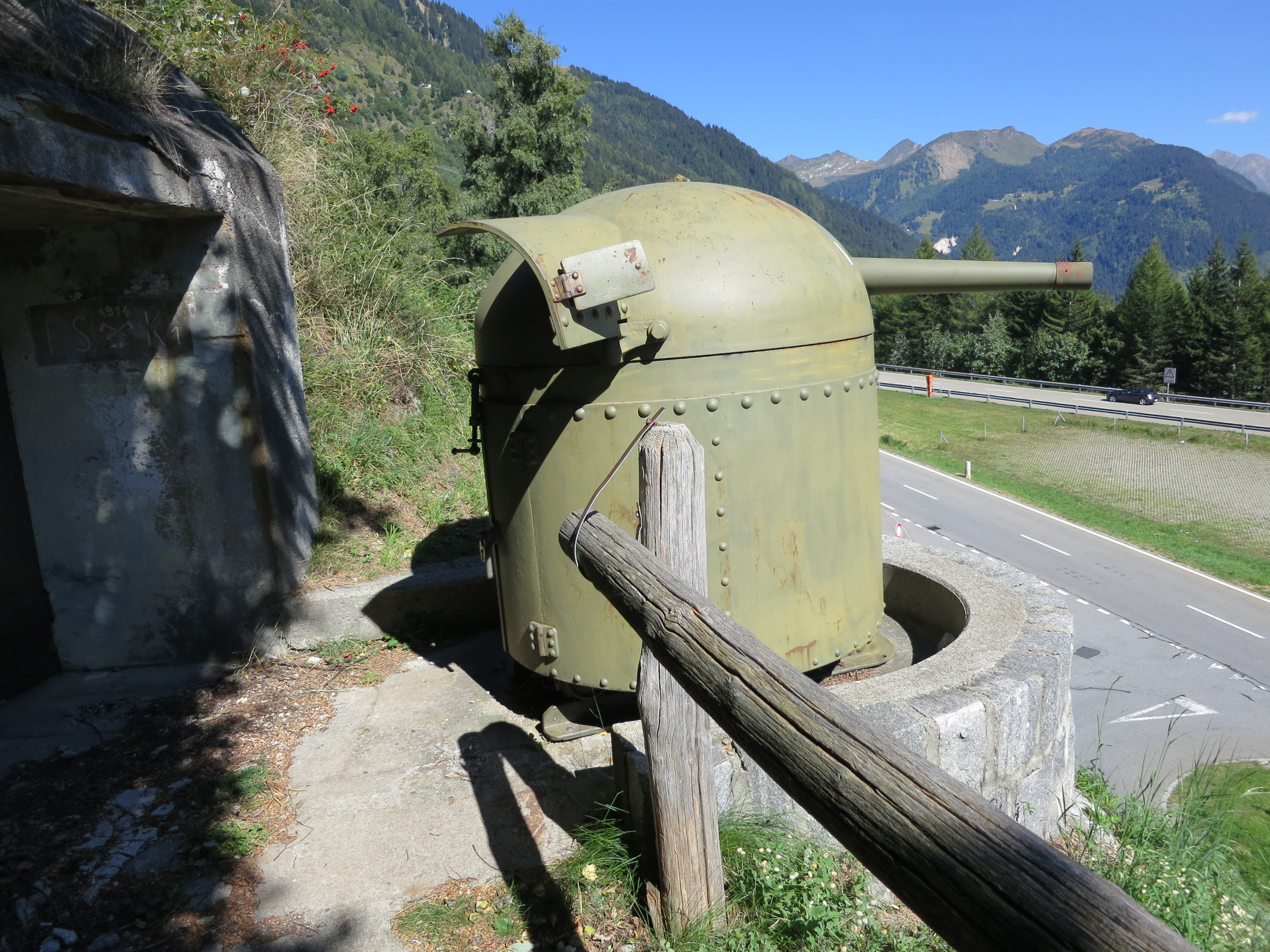
A Swiss gun.

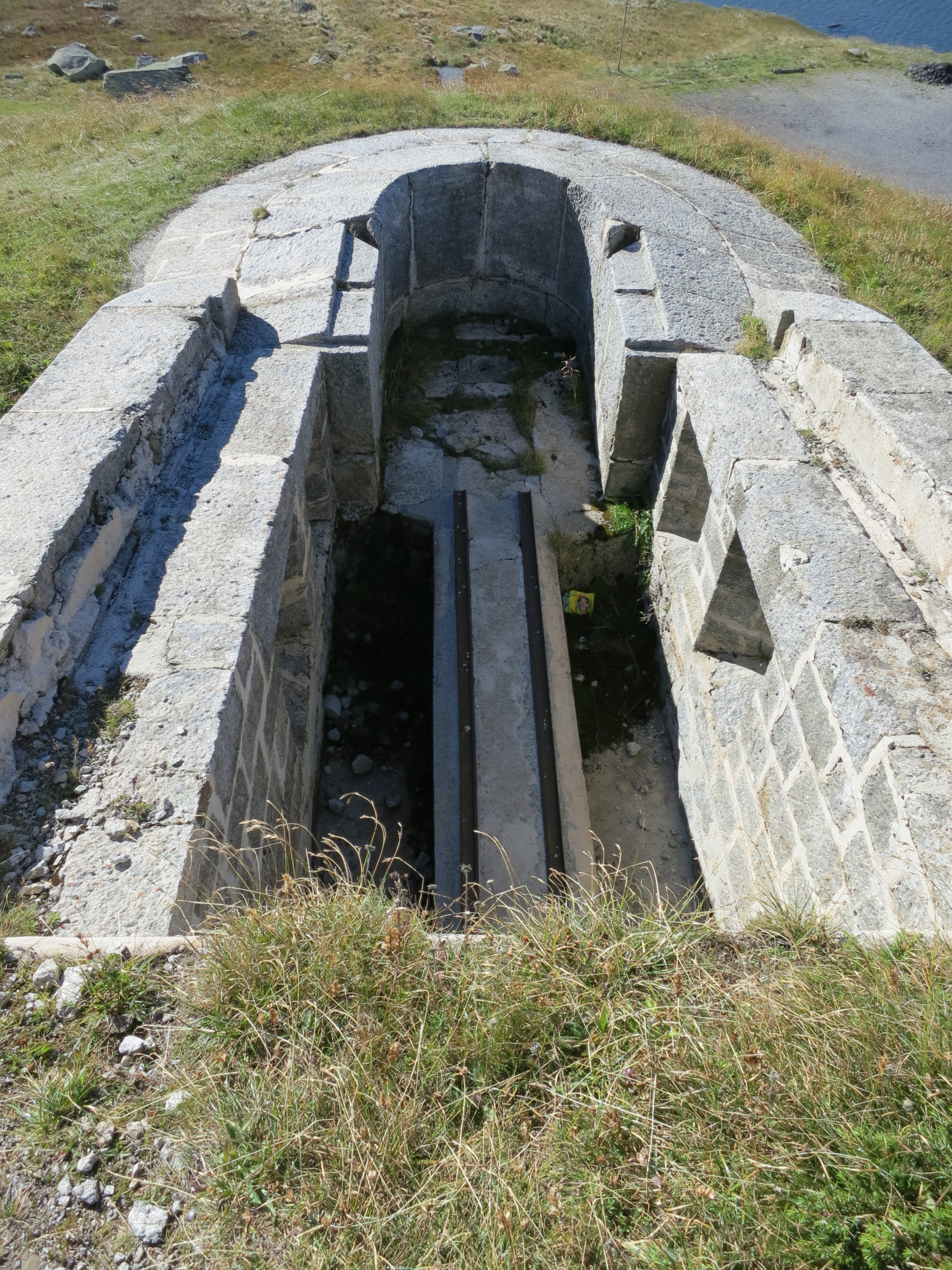
The 60 cm track used to reposition the gun.

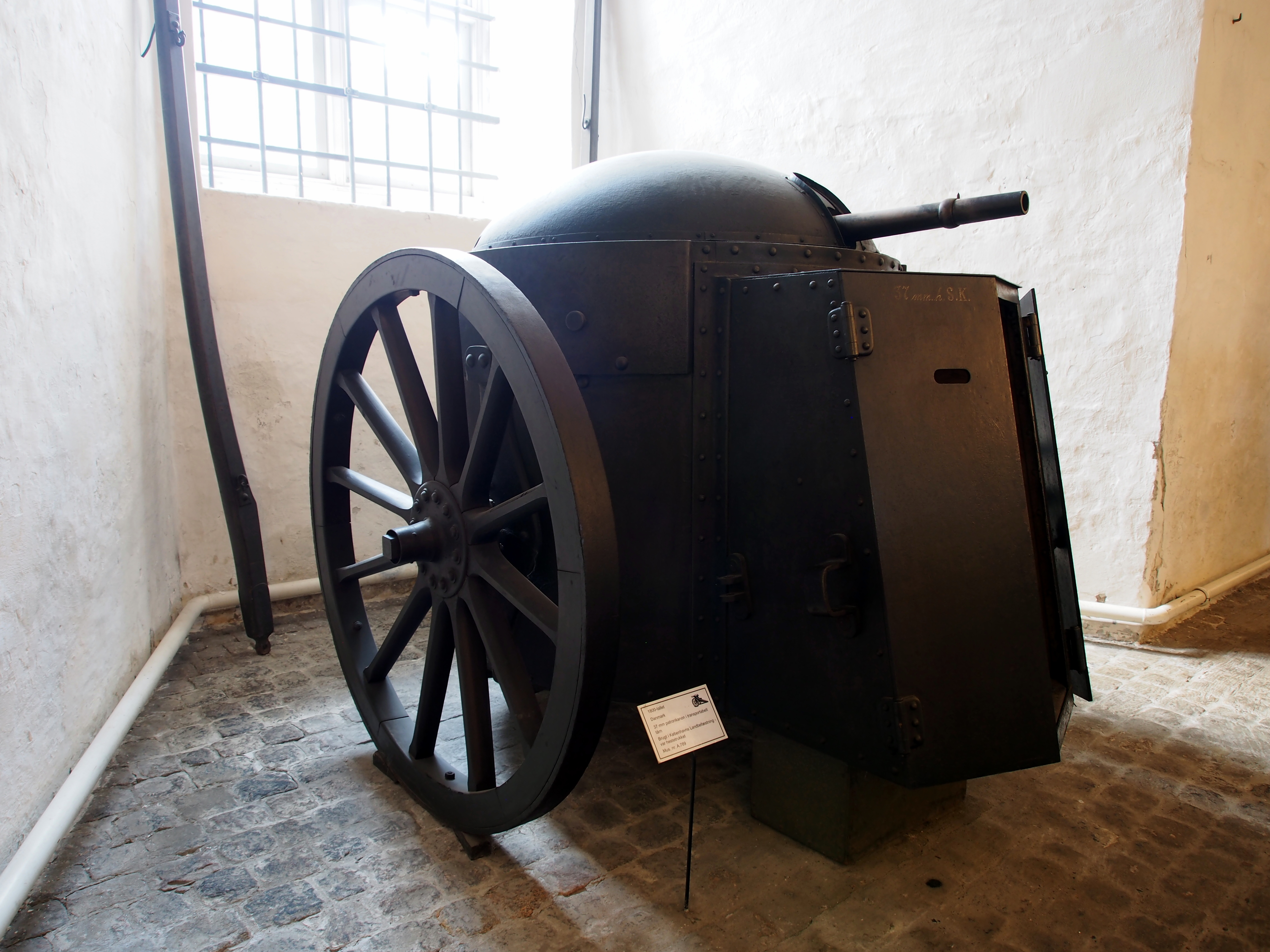
A Danish 37 mm L/30 gun in the Royal Danish Arsenal Museum.
