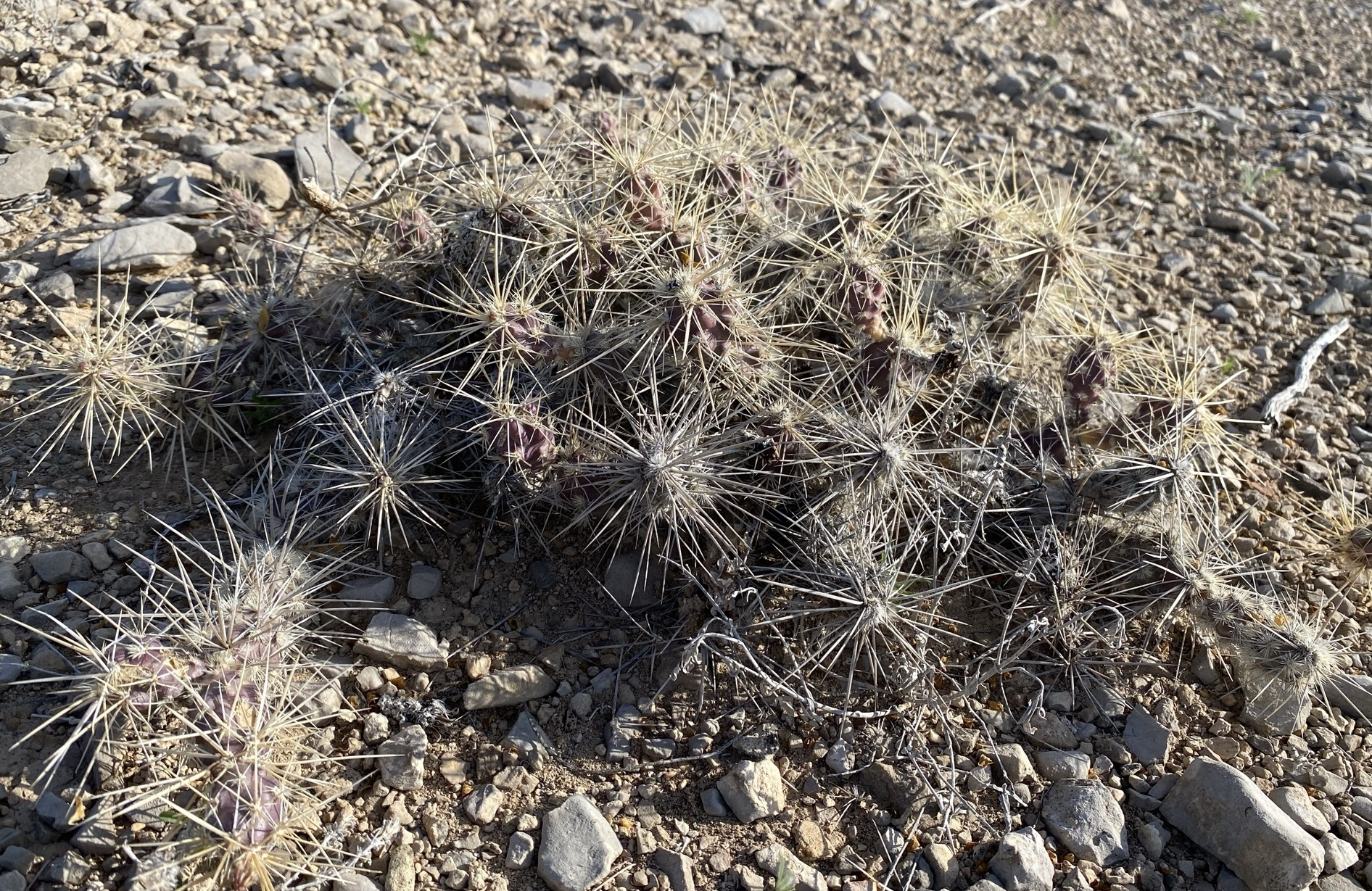

Scientific classification
- Kingdom: Plantae
- Clade: Tracheophytes
- Clade: Angiosperms
- Clade: Eudicots
- Order: Caryophyllales
- Family: Cactaceae
- Genus: Grusonia
- Species: G. grahamii

Binomial name
- Grusonia grahamii (Engelm.) H. Rob.

Synonyms
- Opuntia schottii var. grahamii; :Opuntia agglomerata

= Grusonia grahamii =

Species of cactus

Grusonia grahamii is a species of plant in the family Cactaceae.

It is endemic to Texas and New Mexico in the United States and Chihuahua and Durango in Mexico.
