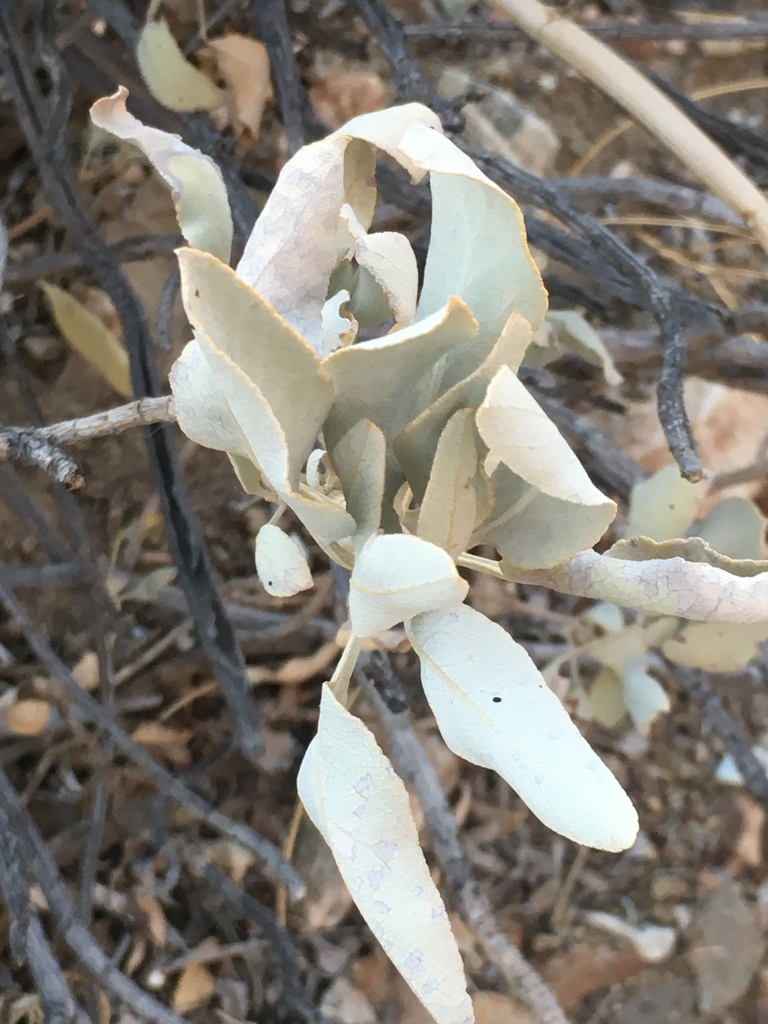

Scientific classification
- Kingdom: Plantae
- Clade: Tracheophytes
- Clade: Angiosperms
- Clade: Eudicots
- Clade: Asterids
- Order: Lamiales
- Family: Lamiaceae
- Genus: Salvia
- Species: S. vaseyi

Binomial name
- Salvia vaseyi (Porter) Parish

= Salvia vaseyi =

Species of flowering plant

Salvia vaseyi, the scallop-leaf sage, bristle sage or wand sage, is a perennial native to the western Colorado Desert. The specific epithet vaseyi honors the American plant collector George Richard Vasey, not to be confused with his father George Vasey.

== Description ==
Flowers grow in compact clusters on 1 to 2 ft (0.30 to 0.61 m) spikes. The .5 inches (1.3 cm) flowers are white, with whitish bracts, calyx, and leaves, blooming from April to June.

== Taxonomy ==
Salvia vaseyi was first described as Audibertia vaseyi by the American botanist Thomas Conrad Porter in 1881. The American botanist Samuel Bonsall Parish placed Audibertia vaseyi into genus Salvia in 1907. As of January 2025, the name Salvia vaseyi (Porter) Parish is widely accepted.

In his description, Porter describes the type specimen as follows:

Mountain Springs, San Diego county, California, June 1880. This plant is No. 500 of a large and fine collection made last summer in lower California by Mr. G. R. Vasey, in whose honor it is named.

Later authors attributed the specific epithet vaseyi to the well-known botanist George Vasey, when in fact the type specimen was collected by his son George Richard Vasey.
