= Mimulus parishii =

Mimulus parishii may refer to two different species of plants:

- Mimulus parishii Greene, a synonym for Erythranthe parishii (Greene) G.L.Nesom & N.S.Fraga
- Mimulus parishii Gand., a synonym for Erythranthe nasuta (Greene) G.L.Nesom
