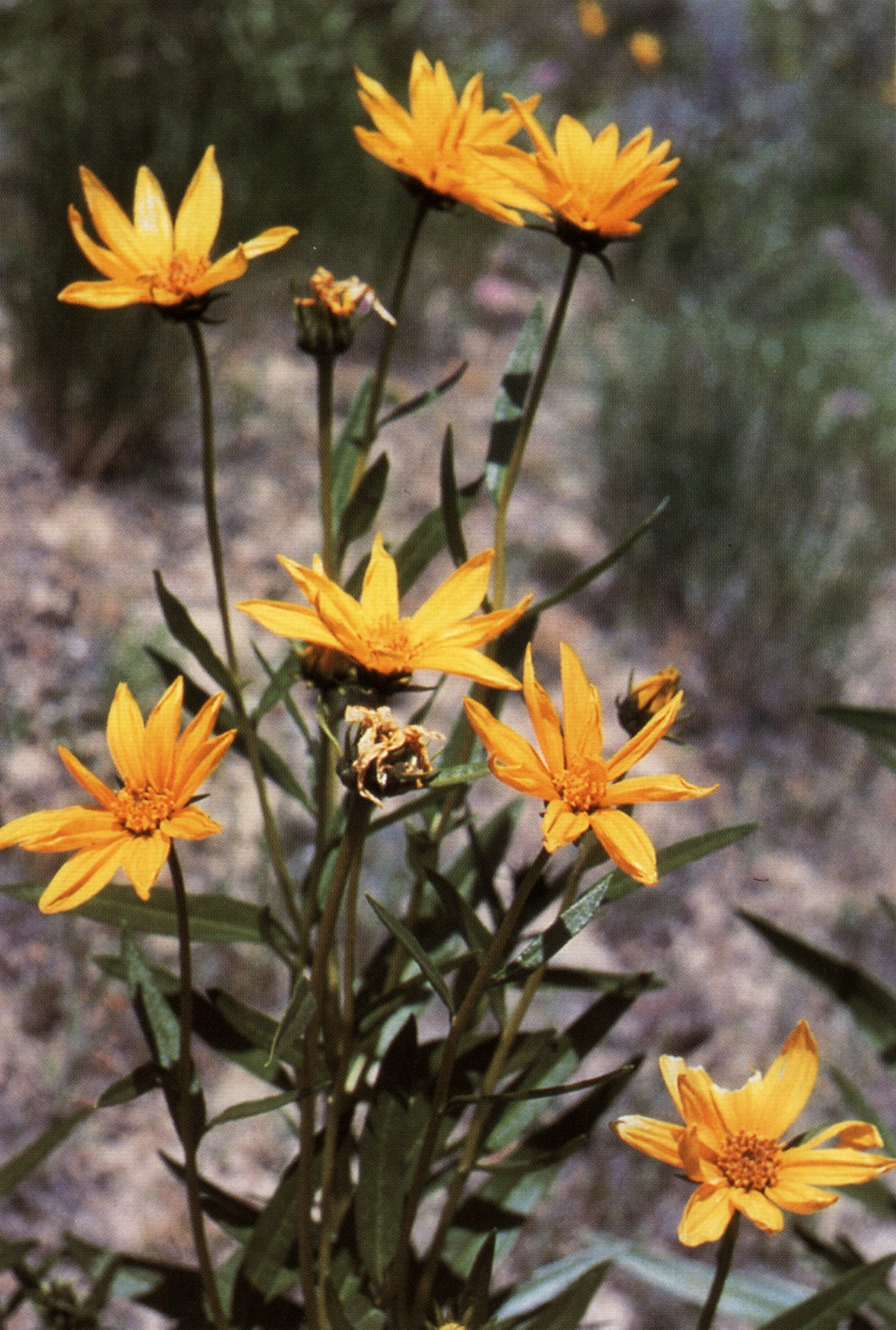

Conservation status
- Least Concern (IUCN 3.1)

- Secure (NatureServe)

Scientific classification
- Kingdom: Plantae
- Clade: Tracheophytes
- Clade: Angiosperms
- Clade: Eudicots
- Clade: Asterids
- Order: Asterales
- Family: Asteraceae
- Tribe: Heliantheae
- Genus: Helianthus
- Species: H. nuttallii

Binomial name
- Helianthus nuttallii Torr. & A.Gray

Synonyms
- Helianthus fascicularis Greene; Helianthus parishii A.Gray, syn of subsp. parishii; Helianthus rydbergii Britton, syn of subsp. rydbergii

= Helianthus nuttallii =

Species of sunflower

Helianthus nuttallii, or Nuttall's sunflower, is a species of sunflower native to northern, central, and western North America, from Newfoundland west to British Columbia, south to Missouri, New Mexico, and California.

Helianthus nuttallii is a herbaceous perennial plant growing to 20–160 inches (50–410 cm) tall. The leaves are opposite on the lower part of the stem, alternate higher up, narrow lanceolate, 3.2–8.0 inches (8.1–20.3 cm) long and 6–30 mm (1/4–1 1/8 in) wide, with a rough texture. The flowers are yellow, produced in a flowerhead approximately 3.6 inches (10 cm) diameter with 10–20 ray florets and at least 60 disc florets; each stem bears one to a few flowerheads.

Subspecies of Helianthus nuttallii include:

- Helianthus nuttallii subsp. nuttallii - Canada, western United States. is a subspecies of Helianthus nuttallii in the genus Helianthus in the family Asteraceae. H. nuttallii subsp. nuttallii is considered by some to be a synonym for H. nuttallii. However, others argue that it is distinct from the species.
- Helianthus nuttallii subsp. parishii (A.Gray) Heiser - (Los Angeles sunflower). Southern California, endemic. The subspecies is presumed to be extinct since 1937.
- Helianthus nuttallii subsp. rydbergii (Britton) R. Long. - Central Canada, interior northwestern United States
