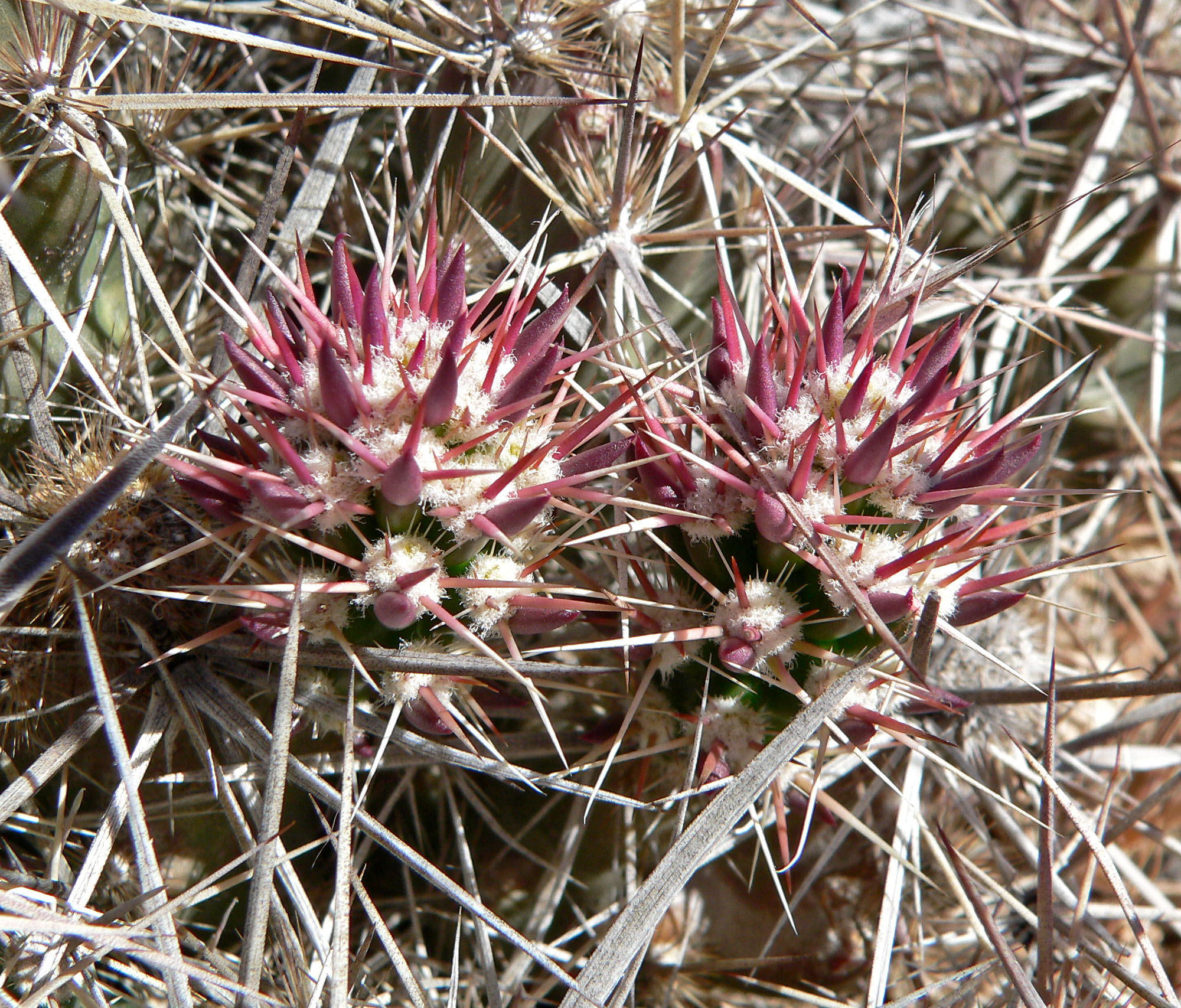
- Grusonia parishiorum

Scientific classification
- Kingdom: Plantae
- Clade: Tracheophytes
- Clade: Angiosperms
- Clade: Eudicots
- Order: Caryophyllales
- Family: Cactaceae
- Subfamily: Opuntioideae
- Tribe: Cylindropuntieae
- Genus: Grusonia; Rchb.f. ex Britton & Rose

Type species
- Grusonia bradtiana

Species
- See list

Synonyms
- Corynopuntia Knuth, 1935; Marenopuntia Backeb.

= Grusonia =

Genus of cacti

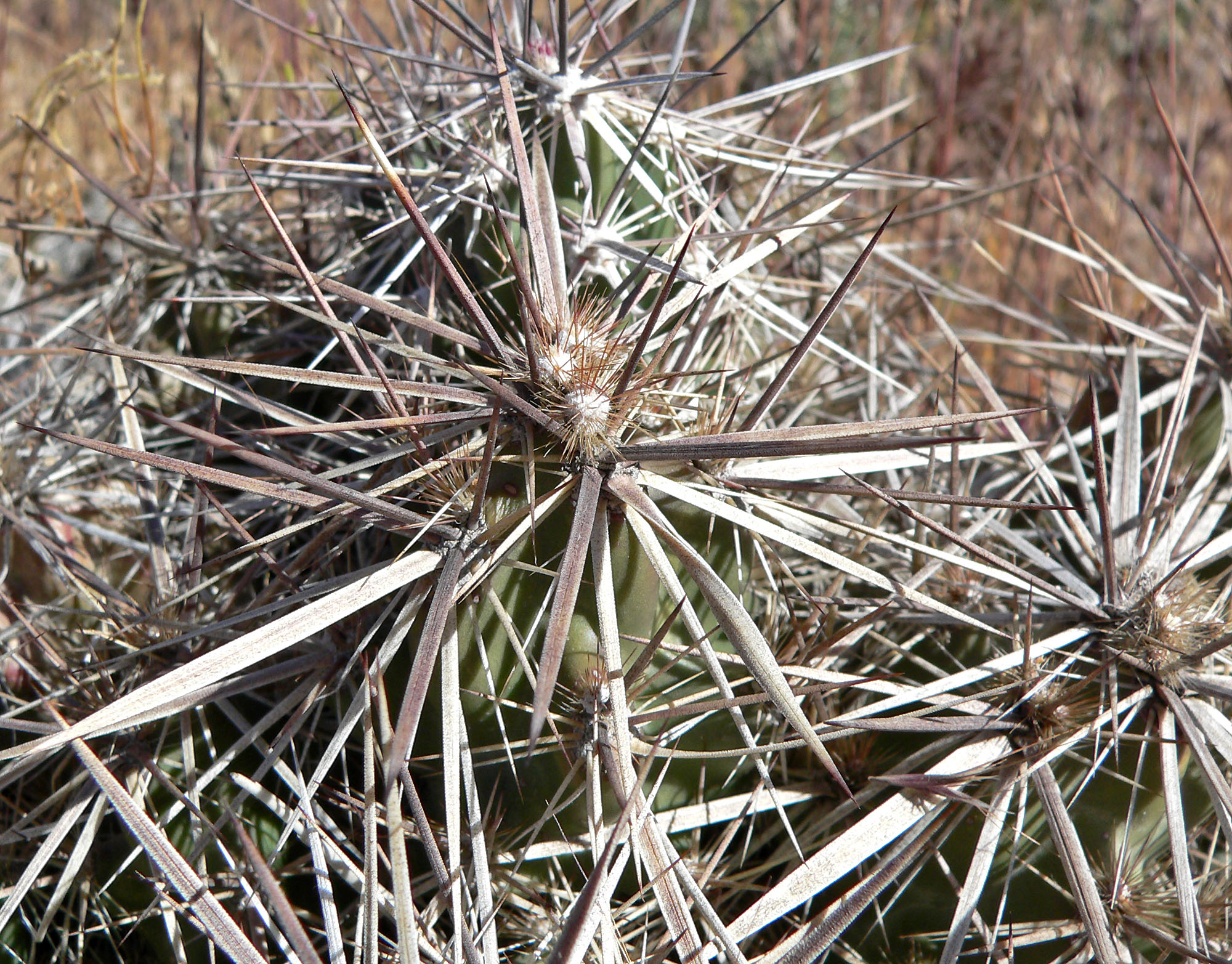
Grusonia parishiorum

Grusonia is a genus of opuntioid cacti (family Cactaceae), originating from the North American Deserts in Southwest United States and northern Mexico, including Baja California. Authors differ on precise boundaries of the genus, which has been included in Cylindropuntia. Corynopuntia, also known as club chollas (or "perritos" in Mexico), is now a synonym, with the genus originally being described by Knuth in 1935. Molecular phylogenetic studies suggest that it should be included in Grusonia, a view accepted by Plants of the World Online as of June 2021.

== Etymology ==
The name Corynopuntia comes from the Greek coryne, meaning ‘club’, and refers to the club-shaped branch segments, so "club opuntia", club cholla.

== Description ==
These opuntioid plants grow in low opuntioid cushions, consisting of rather ovoid or slightly clavate segments, from 1 up to 25 cm long, tuberculate, not ribbed, glabrous. Spines are strong, very prickly and dangerous, covered on their margins by fine denticles, with epidermal tunica (sheath) at the apex only. Flower generally yellow, few species have pink to deep magenta flower. Fruit narrowly obconic to ellipsoid, fleshy at first but soon drying, yellow to brownish, often stinky, generally full of glochids and spiny. Seed yellowish white to brownish, suborbicular or flattened. Most of the species belonging to Corynopuntia show a very similar morphology, apparently with few differences, so this genus was little studied. Recent in-depth field and lab researches are improving the knowledge about these plants, showing the existence of many undescribed species. Whilst Corynopuntia members are morphologically similar one to each other, the mentioned research studies highlighted that wild club chollas rarely naturally hybridize when they grow sympatric.

== Taxonomy ==
The genus Corynopuntia was first set up in 1935 as a segregate from Opuntia, but was reduced to sectional rank by Benson in 1969 and slightly elevated again to a subgenus by Bravo in 1972. In 1999, Anderson included Corynopuntia in his enlarged concept of Grusonia. Pioneering DNA work by Dickie in 1997, subsequent molecular data from Wallace and Dickie (2002) and Griffith (2003), and seed micromorphology studies by Stuppy (2002), suggested that Corynopuntia should be reinstated as a distinct genus. This was accepted by the Cactaceae Consensus Group in 2006. However, a 2016 molecular phylogenetic study of the tribe Cylindropuntieae showed that when separated, Corynopuntia and Grusonia were polyphyletic, and so combined them as Grusonia. This is accepted by Plants of the World Online as of June 2021.

== Distribution ==
The members of the genus Grusonia are native of South-Western United States (California, Arizona, Nevada, New Mexico and Texas) and Northern Mexico (States of Baja California, Baja California Sur, Sonora, Chihuahua, Coahuila, Nuevo Leon, Durango, Zacatecas, San Luis Potosì, Tamaulipas), from 60 up to 2000 m above the sea level.

== Ecology ==
Club chollas grow generally in very dry areas, on flats or gentle slopes, fully exposed to the sunlight or sometimes under sparse bushes. Depending on the species, they grow on sandy, loamy or gravelly soil. The stem segments of several species readily break off when touched: this is an important method of vegetative reproduction for these cacti, since the finely toothed spines stick to animal skin or fur, then the segment can be transported even for miles. The barbed spines can remain embedded in the skin, causing discomfort and sometimes injury.

== Species ==
Species of the genus Grusonia according to Plants of the World Online as of September 2026:

Image	Scientific name	Distribution
	Grusonia aggeria (Ralston & Hilsenb.) E.F.Anderson	United States (Texas) to Mexico (Coahuila)
	Grusonia bradtiana (J.M.Coult.) Britton & Rose	Mexico
	Grusonia bulbispina (Engelm.) H.Rob.	Mexico
	Grusonia clavata (Engelm.) H.Rob.	New Mexico
	Grusonia deinacantha (D.Donati) Majure, M.A.Baker & Cloud-H.	Mexico (Coahuila).
	Grusonia densispina (Ralston & Hilsenb.) Pinkava ex Rebman	United States (Texas) to Mexico
	Grusonia emoryi (Engelm.) Pinkava	United States (Texas, Arizona, New Mexico) to Mexico
	Grusonia grahamii (Engelm.) H.Rob.	United States (Texas, New Mexico) to Mexico (Jalisco)
	Grusonia guccinii (D.Donati) Bárcenas & H.M.Hern.	Mexico (Coahuila).
	Grusonia halophila (D.Donati) Majure, M.A.Baker & Cloud-H.	Mexico (Coahuila)
	Grusonia invicta (Brandegee) E.F.Anderson	Mexico (Baja California).
	Grusonia kunzei (Rose) Pinkava	United States (Arizona, California) and Mexico (Baja California Norte, Sonora).
	Grusonia marenae (S.H.Parsons) E.F.Anderson	Mexico (Sonora).
	Grusonia moelleri (A.Berger) E.F.Anderson	Mexico (Coahuila, Durango, San Luis Potosí)
	Grusonia nigrispina (D.Donati) M.H.J.van der Meer	Mexico (Coahuila)
	Grusonia parishiorum (Orcutt ex Britton & Rose) Pinkava	United States (Arizona, California, Nevada )
	Grusonia pulvinata D.Donati	Mexico (Zacatecas, San Luis Potosí)
	Grusonia reflexispina (Wiggins & Rollins) E.F.Anderson	Mexico (Sonora)
	Grusonia schottii (Engelm.) H.Rob.	United States (Texas) to Mexico
