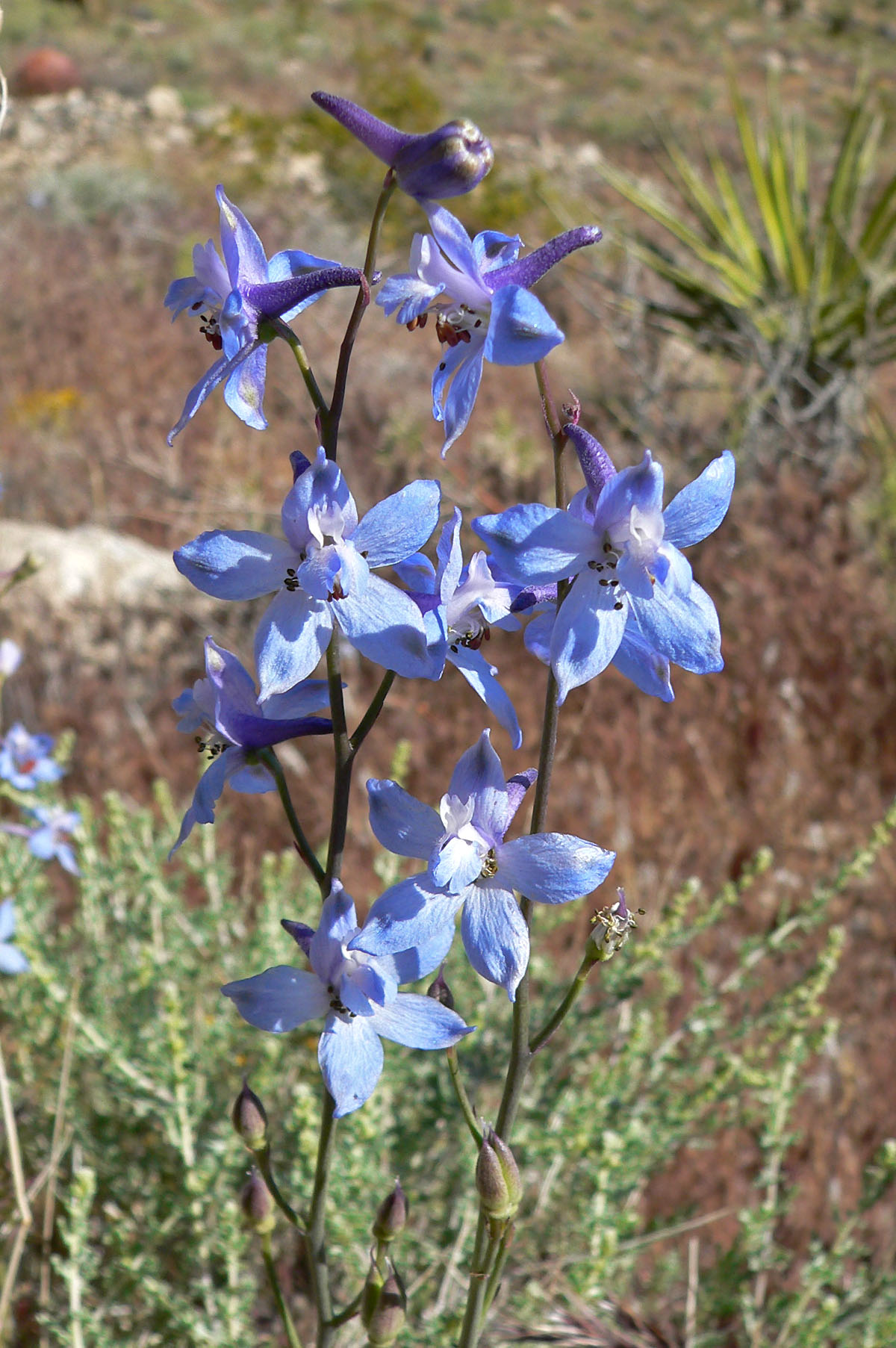

Scientific classification
- Kingdom: Plantae
- Clade: Tracheophytes
- Clade: Angiosperms
- Clade: Eudicots
- Order: Ranunculales
- Family: Ranunculaceae
- Genus: Delphinium
- Species: D. parishii

Binomial name
- Delphinium parishii A.Gray

= Delphinium parishii =

Species of plant

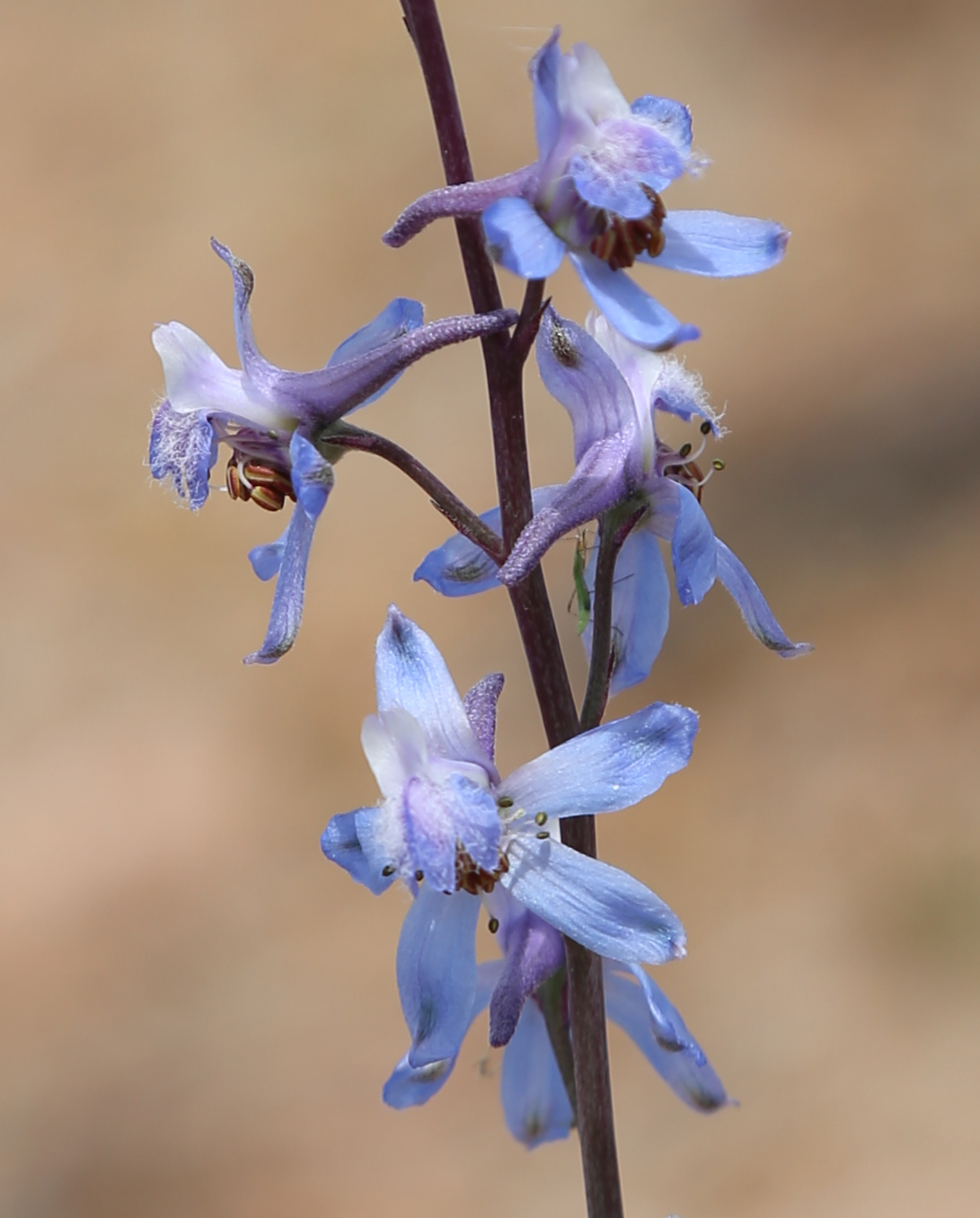
Closeup of flowers

Delphinium parishii, the desert larkspur, is a flowering plant in the family Ranunculaceae (the buttercup family) native to the Mojave Desert, in the southwestern United States and northwest Mexico. In Southern California it is also found in the Tehachapi Mountains, Transverse Ranges, and eastern Sierra Nevada.

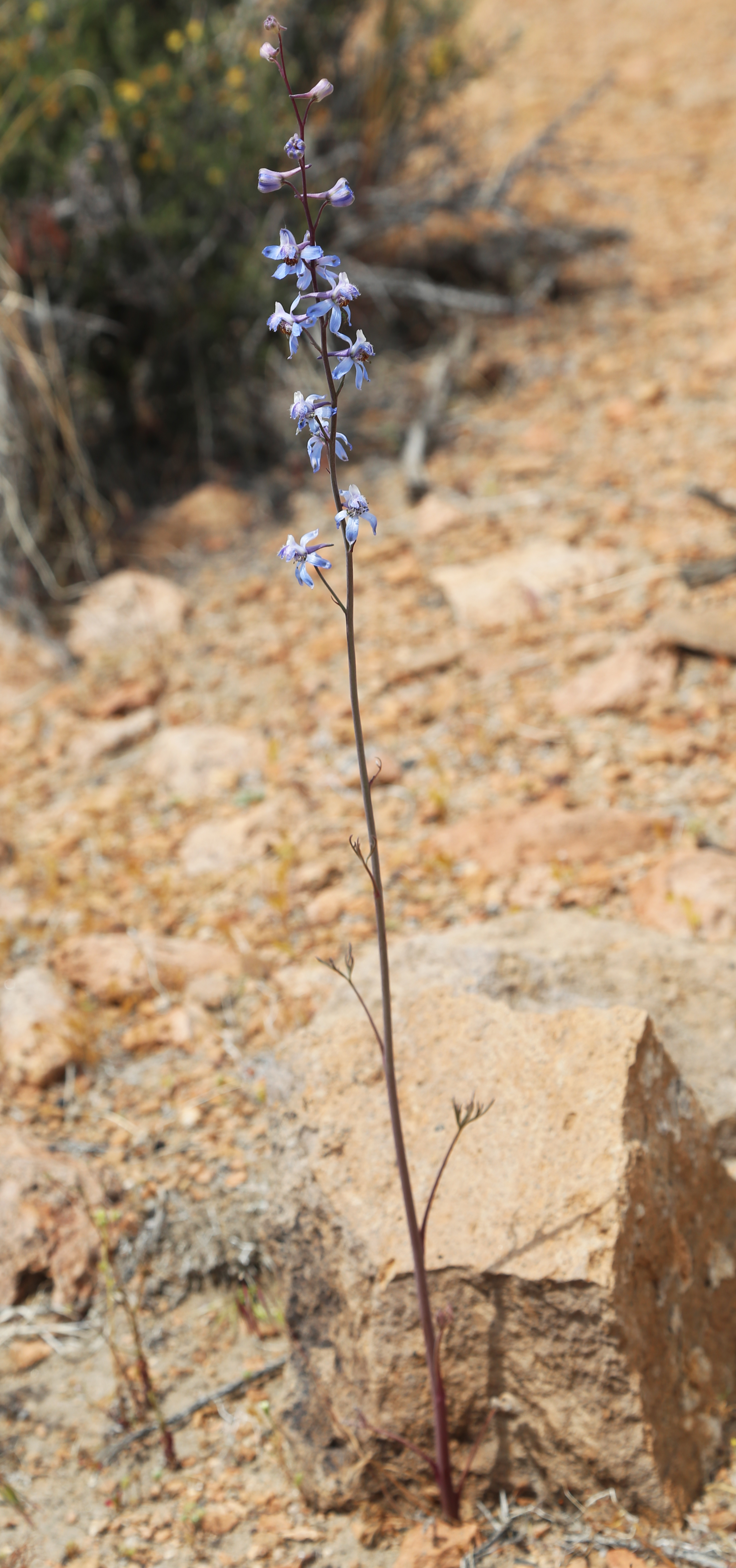
Desert larkspur plant stalk with flowers and buds

It is found in desert scrub between 300–2,500 metres (980–8,200 ft) of elevation in California, Arizona, southwestern Utah, and Baja California.

== Description ==
Delphinium parishi is a perennial herbaceous plant growing to 17–60 cm tall, rarely to 100 cm tall, with palmately lobed leaves which often shrivel by the time of flowering.

The flowers vary across the species' range, from dark blue to purplish near Joshua Tree National Park, sky-blue in the eastern and northern parts of the desert, and pink in some areas in California. Each flower can be multi-hued as well, often with upper true petals white, nectar spur darker blue or purple, and sepals light blue with darker tips. Flowering occurs between April and June.
