= Hermann Gruson =

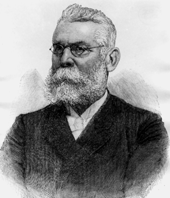
Hermann Gruson

Hermann August Jacques Gruson (March 13, 1821, in Magdeburg – January 30, 1895) was a German engineer, inventor and industrial entrepreneur.

== Life ==
Hermann Gruson was a descendant of a Huguenot immigrant family, and son of Prime Minister Lieutenant Louis Abraham Gruson in Magdeburg citadel. He attended the Domgymnasium Magdeburg, but then switched to the industrial and trade school, which he graduated in 1839, and did his military service as a one-year volunteer in a pioneer unit. He then attended the University of Berlin, where he concentrated mainly on scientific and mathematical subjects and also attended lectures of his uncle Johann Philipp Gruson.

Gruson then worked for five years in the engineering works of August Borsig, who was friends with his father, and learned machining. Borsig was able to place Gruson in a job with the Berlin-Hamburg railway, which he held between 1843 and 1851. In November 1847, Gruson rescued a boy who was drowning, and was awarded a medal for saving his life. Then, beginning on February 1, 1851, he took a chief engineering position for Friedrich Wöhlert in Berlin for three years.

In 1854, he was the first technical director of the United Hamburg-Magdeburg Steamship Company. He founded on 1 June 1855 in Buckau at Magdeburg the "Factory machinery and shipbuilding workshop H. Gruson Buckau-Magdeburg", located at the mouth of the Elbe. The mainstay of his enterprise was the affiliated foundry. He improved the strength of cast iron by mixing different types of pig iron. As a result, chilled cast iron products from the Grusonwerken became a brand product. Gruson's improvements to cast iron products was an important development for mechanical engineering and railway construction in Germany, as many railway and car manufacturers exclusively purchased Gruson's hard cast wheels.

In 1856, Gruson wrote for the inaugural meeting of the Association of German Engineers (VDI) in Alexisbad. In 1859, his company went on strike. The conservative Gruson felt compelled in the face of a stronger labor movement to pursue a more social wage policy. Under his leadership, the company was subsequently never to strike again.

He first carried out a successful deployment of the company's products at the Magdeburg-Halberstadt Railway. After 1860, he received an increasing amount of defense contracts by the Prussian military. He accordingly expanded production capacity, whereupon more modern facilities were built in the Buckenauer Marienstraße in 1869–1871. At that time also, the Gruson company expanded in the Berggießhübeler iron ore mining area in Saxony. The magnetic iron ore (magnetite) in this region was of very high quality and had gained supra-regional reputation as "Pirnisch iron" in the 16th century.

Gruson acquired the mine in 1870, "Mother of God united field including God with us and Friedrich Erbstolln" which he renamed after his daughter in "Marie Louise Stolln" and in the years to comprehensively modernized and expanded. However, the yield of the ore deposit fell short of expectations, so that the mining was in 1892 largely abandoned. An inscription above the entrance hole of the visitor mine "Marie Louise Stolln" commemorates to this day the former mine owners Hermann Gruson and his daughter Marie Louise.

== Fortification turrets ==
From his Buckenauer foundry also the first armoured gun turrets for fortifications emerged in Germany. Thus, several forts were in the Weser estuary for coastal defenses after 1871 that contained revolving turrets based on the Gruson system. These towers were manufactured by a special casting process. Other major contracts included: turret and gun emplacements for the Italian naval base, La Spezia, factory-assembled carriages by Max Schumann, and the development and the construction of their own guns required further plant expansions. In 1886, Grusonwerk was converted into a stock corporation and renamed as Grusonwerk AG Buckau.

In Tangerhütte the Gruson AG, whose management Gruson further held, erected a 10 km long firing range. The guns there tested and pre-led have been exported around the world. However, the Gruson AG also built a variety of civilian facilities (ore processing, lifting equipment, transport equipment).

Gruson also designed the unusual "fahrpanzer" mobile turret, usually horse-drawn in the field but mounted on rails in some forts.

On July 1, 1891 Gruson ended his participation on the board of Gruson AG. Two years later the company was acquired by Krupp and renamed Gruson in Friedrich Krupp AG. After the end of World War II from this was the SKET Magdeburg.

Gruson was dedicated to continue scientific studies. In 1893 he published, largely unnoticed, a research paper for zodiacal light, entitled "In the kingdom of light." His work as a botanist was more successful. He owned the largest collection of cacti in Europe. With his death, he donated his extensive collection of plants and a large endowment to the city of Magdeburg. In 1896, the Grusonschen greenhouses, now housing a collection of many rare endangered exotic plants, were built in Magdeburg.

== Honours ==
Gruson is an honorary citizen of Magdeburg. The city also named a street near the University of Magdeburg after him, called Grusonstraße, near the university's Department of Mechanical Engineering. Furthermore, a species and a genus of cactus have been named after him: Echinocactus grusonii and Grusonia.
