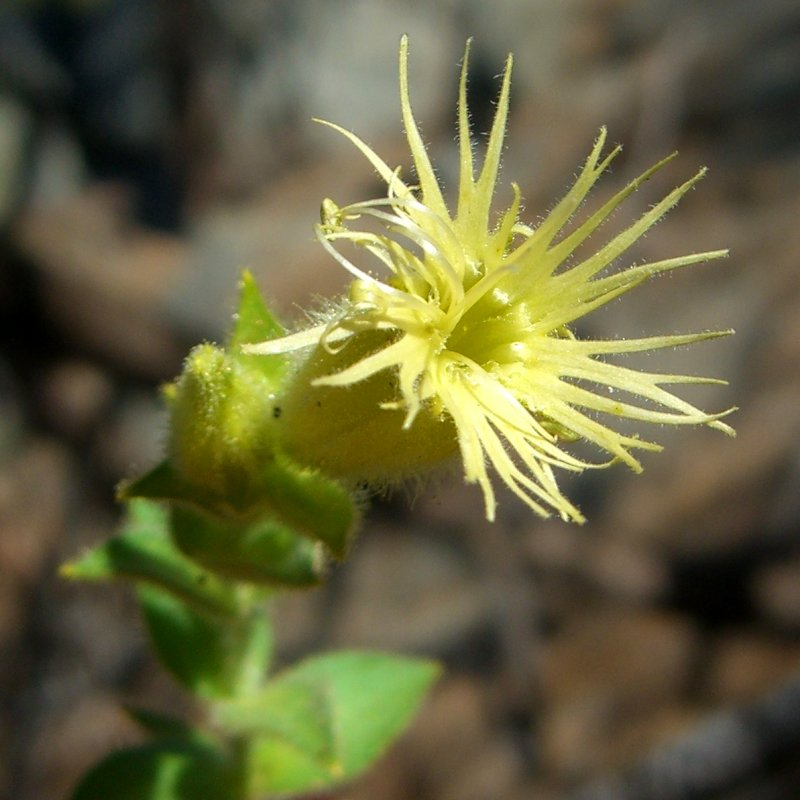

Scientific classification
- Kingdom: Plantae
- Clade: Tracheophytes
- Clade: Angiosperms
- Clade: Eudicots
- Order: Caryophyllales
- Family: Caryophyllaceae
- Genus: Silene
- Species: S. parishii

Binomial name
- Silene parishii S.Watson

= Silene parishii =

Species of flowering plant

Silene parishii is a species of flowering plant in the family Caryophyllaceae known by the common name Parish's catchfly. It is endemic to southern California, where it is known from several of the local mountain ranges, including the San Bernardino, San Gabriel, and San Jacinto Mountains. It grows in rocky, forested habitat, sometimes in the alpine climates of the higher peaks. It is a perennial herb growing from a woody, branching caudex and taproot, sending up several decumbent or erect stems 10 to 40 centimetres tall. The oppositely arranged leaves line the stems, the largest ones located at the middle of each stem. Leaves are lance-shaped to nearly oval and up to 6 centimetres long. They are thick and leathery, and sometimes glandular and sticky. Each flower is encapsulated in a tubular calyx of fused sepals which may be nearly 3 centimetres long. It is greenish with ten veins and a coating of glandular hairs. The five petals are yellowish in colour and each has about six long, fringelike lobes at the tip.
