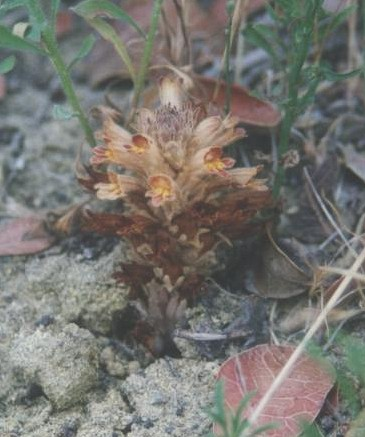

Conservation status
- Apparently Secure (NatureServe)

Scientific classification
- Kingdom: Plantae
- Clade: Tracheophytes
- Clade: Angiosperms
- Clade: Eudicots
- Clade: Asterids
- Order: Lamiales
- Family: Orobanchaceae
- Genus: Orobanche
- Species: O. parishii

Binomial name
- Orobanche parishii (Jeps.) Heckard

= Orobanche parishii =

Species of flowering plant

Orobanche parishii is a species of broomrape known by the common names Parish's broomrape and short-lobed broomrape. It is native to the coast and mountains of California and Baja California, where it is a parasite growing attached to the roots of other plants, usually shrubs of the Asteraceae, such as Menzies' goldenbush (Isocoma menziesii). This plant produces usually one thick, hairy, glandular, pale yellowish stem up to about 26 centimetres (10 in) tall. As a parasite taking its nutrients from a host plant, it lacks leaves and chlorophyll. The inflorescence is a dense cluster of flowers accompanied by dark-veined oval bracts. Each flower has a calyx of triangular sepals and a tubular corolla roughly 2 centimetres (0.8 in) long, pale brownish or pinkish in color with red veining.
