= Malacothamnus parishii =

Scientific classification
- Kingdom: Plantae
- Clade: Tracheophytes
- Clade: Angiosperms
- Clade: Eudicots
- Clade: Rosids
- Order: Malvales
- Family: Malvaceae
- Genus: Malacothamnus
- Species: M. parishii

Binomial name
- Malacothamnus parishii (Eastw.) Kearney

Species of flowering plant

Malacothamnus parishii is a species of flowering plant in the mallow family known by the common name Parish's bushmallow. It is endemic to San Bernardino County, California, where it is confirmed from only a single collection from 1895. It has a California Rare Plant Rank of 1A (Plants presumed extirpated in California and either rare or extinct elsewhere). Malacothamnus parishii is currently treated as an extreme form of Malacothamnus fasciculatus var. laxiflorus. Phylogenetic analyses are needed to confirm whether it should be treated as a separate species or not.
