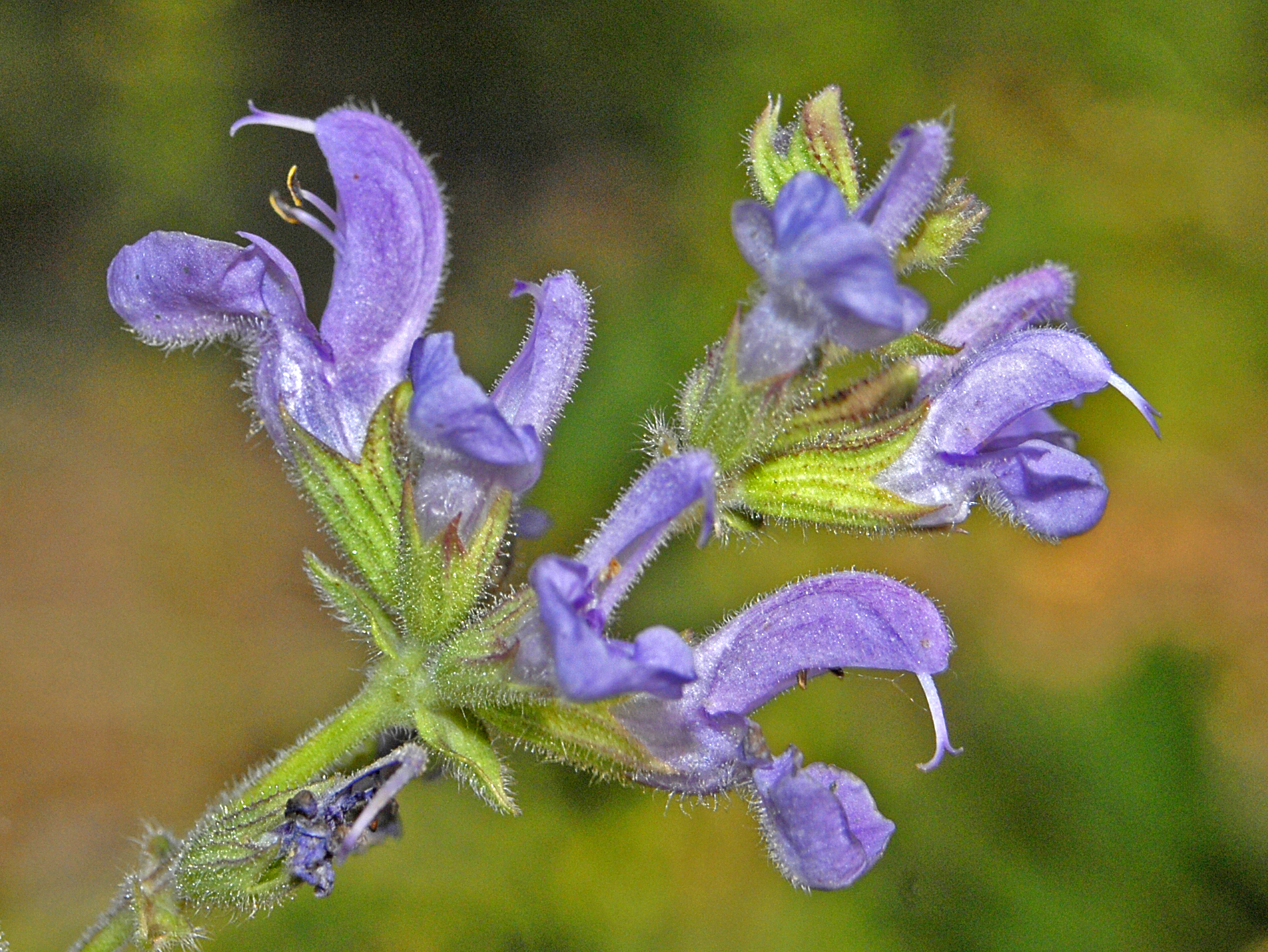
- Flower of Salvia virgata at the Orto Botanico di Brera

Scientific classification
- Kingdom: Plantae
- Clade: Tracheophytes
- Clade: Angiosperms
- Clade: Eudicots
- Clade: Asterids
- Order: Lamiales
- Family: Lamiaceae
- Genus: Salvia
- Species: S. virgata

Binomial name
- Salvia virgata Jacq.

= Salvia virgata =

Species of flowering plant

Salvia virgata (wand sage, southern meadow sage) is a perennial plant that is native to Asia and southeastern Europe. It is considered a noxious weed in many parts of the world.

S. virgata is sometimes included within Salvia pratensis. Flowers grow in whorls of 4–6 with a blue-violet corolla (rarely white) that is 1 to 2 centimetres (0.39 to 0.79 in) long. The ovate to oblong leaves are dull green on the top surface, with the underside covered with glands and thick hairs.
