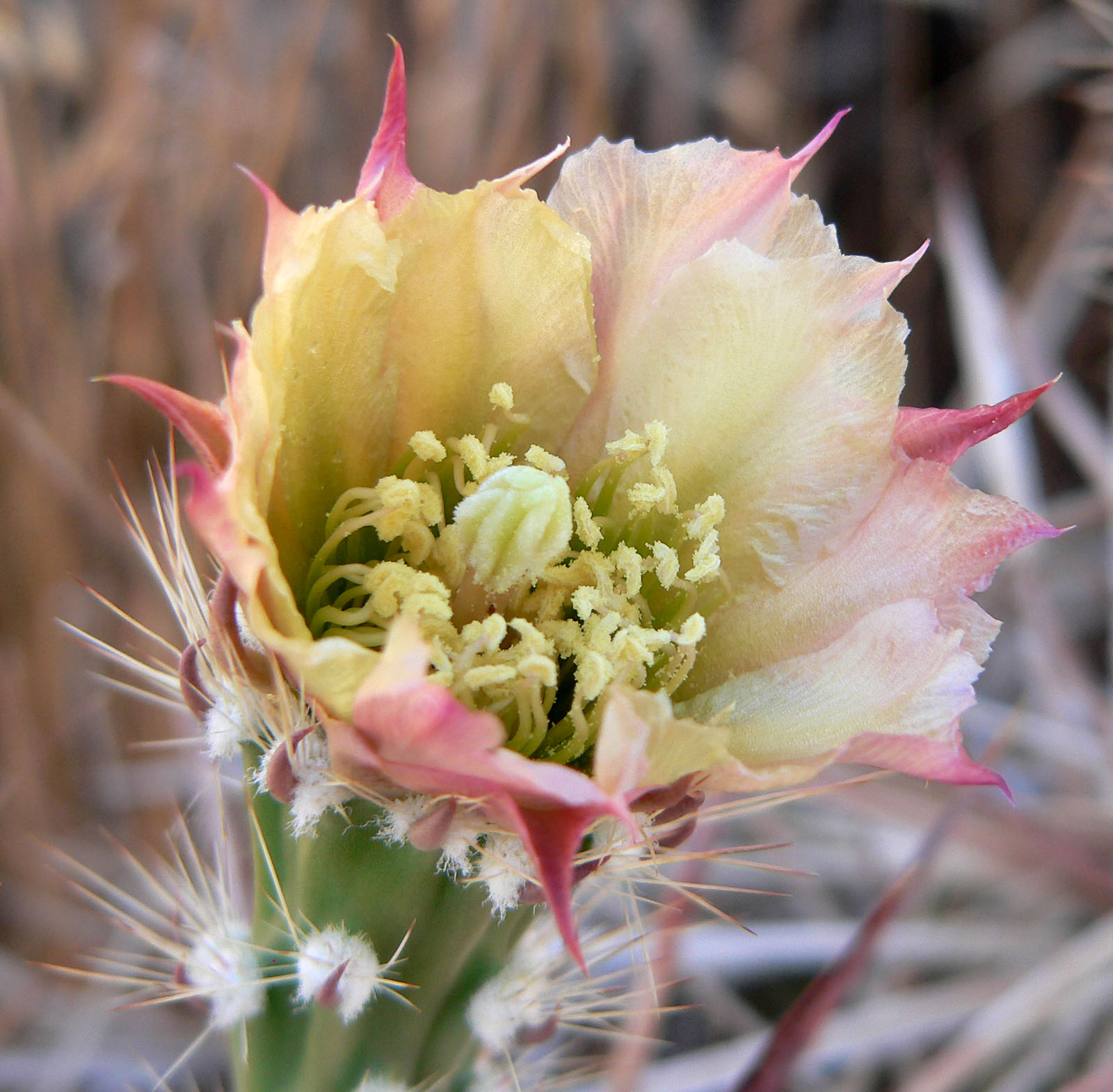

Conservation status
- Vulnerable (NatureServe)

Scientific classification
- Kingdom: Plantae
- Clade: Tracheophytes
- Clade: Angiosperms
- Clade: Eudicots
- Order: Caryophyllales
- Family: Cactaceae
- Genus: Grusonia
- Species: G. parishiorum

Binomial name
- Grusonia parishiorum (Orcutt ex Britton & Rose) Pinkava

Synonyms
- List: Opuntia parishii Orcutt, 1896.; Grusonia parishii (Orcutt) Pinkava 1999; Corynopuntia parishii (Orcutt) F. M. Knuth, 1935.; Corynopuntia parishiorum (Orcutt) F.M.Knuth in C.Backeberg & F.M.Knuth, 1936; Corynopuntia stanlyi var. parishii (Orcutt) Backeb. 1958; Opuntia parishiorum Orcutt ex Britton & Rose, 1919; Grusonia stanlyi (Engelm. ex B.D. Jacks.) H. Rob., 1973.; Opuntia stanlyi Engelm. ex B.D. Jackson, 1848.; Opuntia stanlyi var. parishiorum (Orcutt ex Britton & Rose) L.D.Benson in Cacti Ariz.,1950; Opuntia stanlyi Engelmann var. parishii ((Orcutt) L. D. Benson, 1950.

= Grusonia parishiorum =

Species of cactus

Grusonia parishiorum is a species of cactus known by the common names matted cholla and Parish club cholla. It is native to the Mojave and Sonoran Deserts of California and Arizona.

== Description ==
Grusonia parishiorum grows in spreading mats along the sandy ground no more than about 20 centimetres (7.9 in) tall. The segments are up to 9 centimetres (3.5 in) long by 3 cm (1.2 in) wide and is surfaced in fleshy tubercles bearing many spines each up to 5 centimetres (2.0 in) in length. The flower is yellowish and the fruit is yellow and up to 8 centimetres (3.1 in) long.
