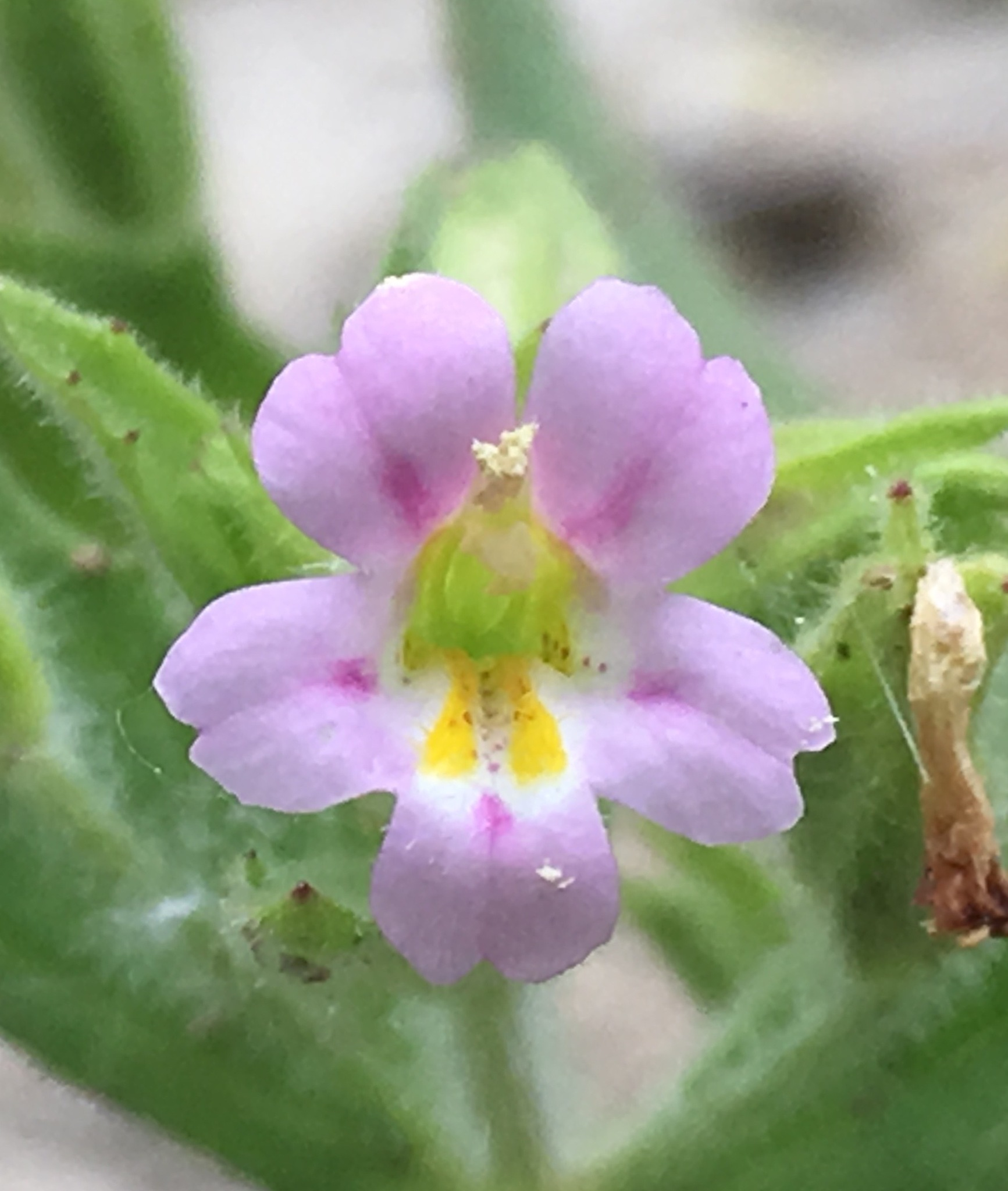
- Ventura County, California, 2019

Scientific classification
- Kingdom: Plantae
- Clade: Tracheophytes
- Clade: Angiosperms
- Clade: Eudicots
- Clade: Asterids
- Order: Lamiales
- Family: Phrymaceae
- Genus: Erythranthe
- Species: E. parishii

Binomial name
- Erythranthe parishii (Greene) G.L.Nesom & N.S.Fraga

= Erythranthe parishii =

Species of flowering plant

Erythranthe parishii is a species of monkeyflower known by the common name Parish's monkeyflower. It was formerly known as Mimulus parishii.

It is native to the mountains and hills of the southern half of California, far western Nevada, and northern Baja California, where it grows in wet, sandy habitat such as streambanks.

The flowers primarily self-pollinate, but the species evolved from an out-crossing ancestor similar to E. lewisii. The flower size greatly reduced as the species transitioned to self-pollination through changes in a number of genes that each have a small effect on the size.

== Description ==
Erythranthe parishii is an annual herb growing up to 50 centimeters in maximum height with a stout, hairy stem. The oppositely arranged oval or widely lance-shaped leaves are up to 7.5 centimeters long.

The narrow, tubular base of the flower is encapsulated in a ribbed calyx of sepals with pointed lobes. The five-lobed flower is almost white, often tinged with pink.
