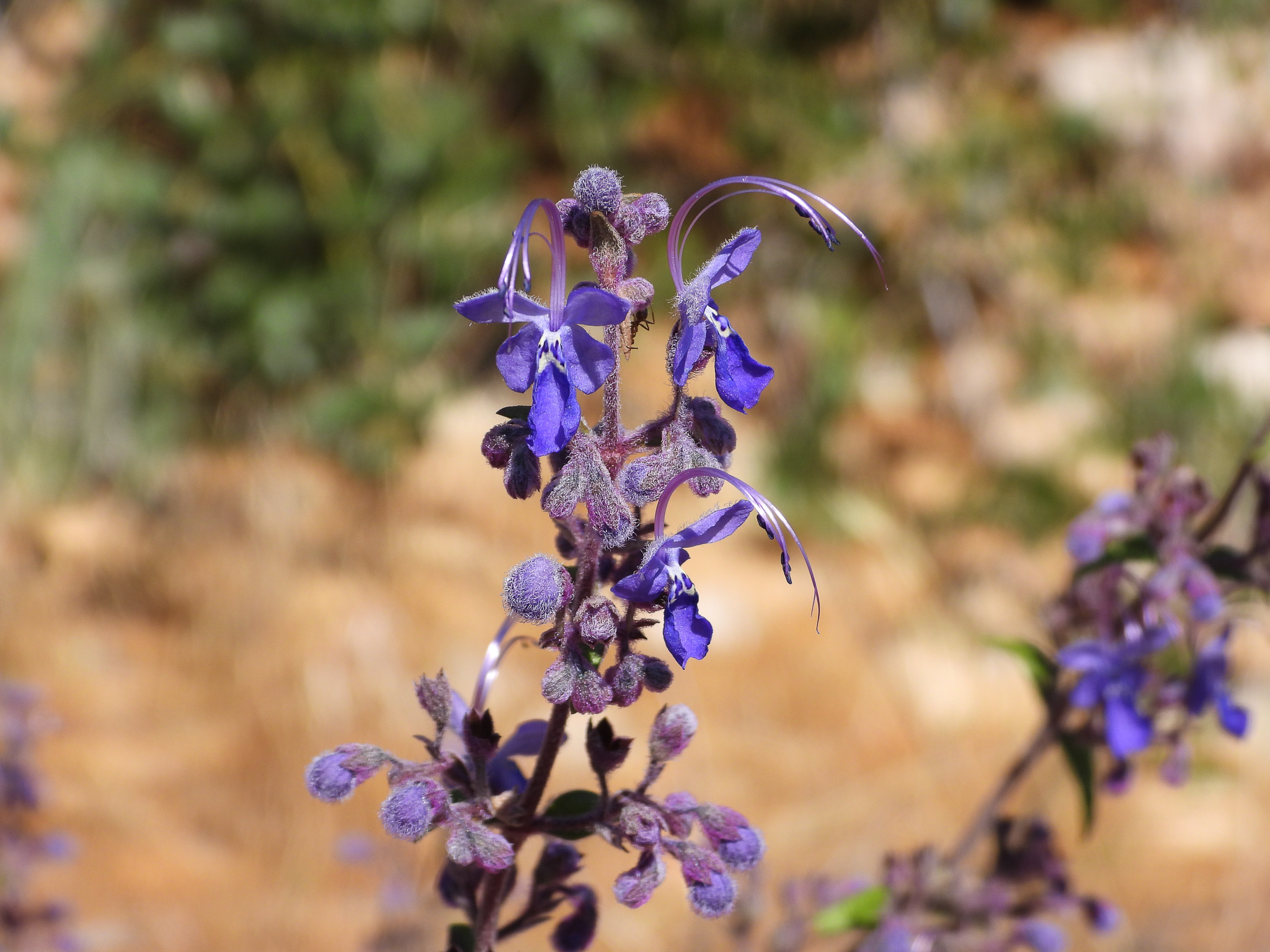

Conservation status
- Vulnerable (NatureServe)

Scientific classification
- Kingdom: Plantae
- Clade: Tracheophytes
- Clade: Angiosperms
- Clade: Eudicots
- Clade: Asterids
- Order: Lamiales
- Family: Lamiaceae
- Genus: Trichostema
- Species: T. parishii

Binomial name
- Trichostema parishii Vasey

= Trichostema parishii =

Species of flowering plant

Trichostema parishii is a species of flowering plant in the mint family known by the common name Parish's bluecurls.

== Distribution ==
It is native to the Transverse Ranges and Peninsular Ranges of southern California and south into Baja California.

Its habitat includes chaparral and coastal sage scrub. It grows at 600–2,000 metres (2,000–6,600 ft) in elevation.

== Description ==
Trichostema parishii is a shrub that grows to a maximum height around 12 decimetres (3.9 ft).

Its aromatic herbage coated in short glandular and nonglandular hairs. The linear leaves are up to 6 centimeters long. Their edges curl under, and they are hairy, especially on the undersides. A cluster of smaller leaves may occur in the axils of each main leaf.

The inflorescence is a long cyme of flowers growing from the stem between each leaf pair. The inflorescence is coated in fluffy, woolly hairs in shades of blue, pink and purple. Each flower has a hairy calyx of pointed sepals and a tubular, lipped purple corolla, the main lower lip measuring up to a centimeter in length. The four stamens are long and curved, measuring up to 2.5 centimeters long.

Its bloom period is from March to May.
