= Abraham Curry =

Founder of Carson City, Nevada (1815–1873)

Abraham Van Santvoord Curry
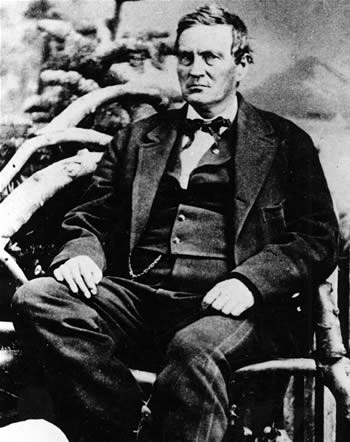
- Nevada Historical Society

Assemblyman of the Nevada Territorial Legislature
- In office 1862–1863
- Governor: James W. Nye

Senator of the Nevada Territorial Legislature
- In office 1863–1864
- Governor: James W. Nye

1st Warden of Nevada Territorial Prison
- In office January 1, 1862 – March 1, 1864
- Governor: James W. Nye
- Succeeded by: Robert M. Howland

Personal details
- Born: February 19, 1815 South Trenton, New York
- Died: October 19, 1873 (aged 58) Carson City, Nevada
- Resting place: Lone Mountain Cemetery; Carson City, Nevada
- Spouse: Mary Ann Cowen
- Children: Charles A., Mary Etta, Emma, Lucy, Elvira, Jane
- Profession: Businessman
- Website: carson.org

Abraham Van Santvoord Curry (February 19, 1815 – October 19, 1873) was an American politician considered the founding father of Carson City, Nevada. A native of the state of New York, he traveled to the West Coast during the California Gold Rush and settled in Nevada's Eagle Valley, where Carson City was established.

Curry served as an assemblyman of the Nevada Territorial Legislature from 1862 to 1863 and was a territorial senator from 1863 to 1864. He was also the first superintendent of the Carson City Mint and the first warden of Nevada State Prison. Curry donated 10 acres (4.0 ha) of land for the site of the Nevada State Capitol, for which the state prison quarry provided the stone for its construction.

Curry spent the final years of his life building facilities for the Virginia and Truckee Railroad in Carson City. Though he had achieved prominence in Nevada, his wife claimed that he had only one dollar in his pocket when he died in 1873.

== Biography ==
Abraham Van Santvoord Curry was born on February 19, 1815, in the hamlet of South Trenton, New York. He was the first son of Campbell Curry and Elvira Skinner Curry, who were married in South Trenton. On August 1, 1835, Curry married Mary Ann Cowen, who was then eighteen years old, in Ogdensburg, New York. Their first child and only son, Charles A. Curry, was born on June 10, 1836. After a year in Ogdensburg, the family moved several times and settled in Portage, Ohio, in 1848. The Currys later had six daughters. By 1852, Curry was working in Cleveland, Ohio, as a commercial merchant and later became an agent for the Michigan Southern Railroad.

=== Travel to the West ===
After his daughters, Elvira and Jane, were each married, Curry and his son Charles took a steamship from New York City that sailed around Cape Horn to San Francisco between 1854 and 1855. In 1856, the two were in the mining town of Red Dog, where Curry opened a bowling alley and established the first branch "tribe" of the Improved Order of Red Men in California. He met future business partners Benjamin F. Green, John J. Musser, and Francis "Frank" Marion Proctor in the nearby town of Downieville.

=== Settlement in Nevada ===
- Abraham Curry House
- U.S. National Register of Historic Places
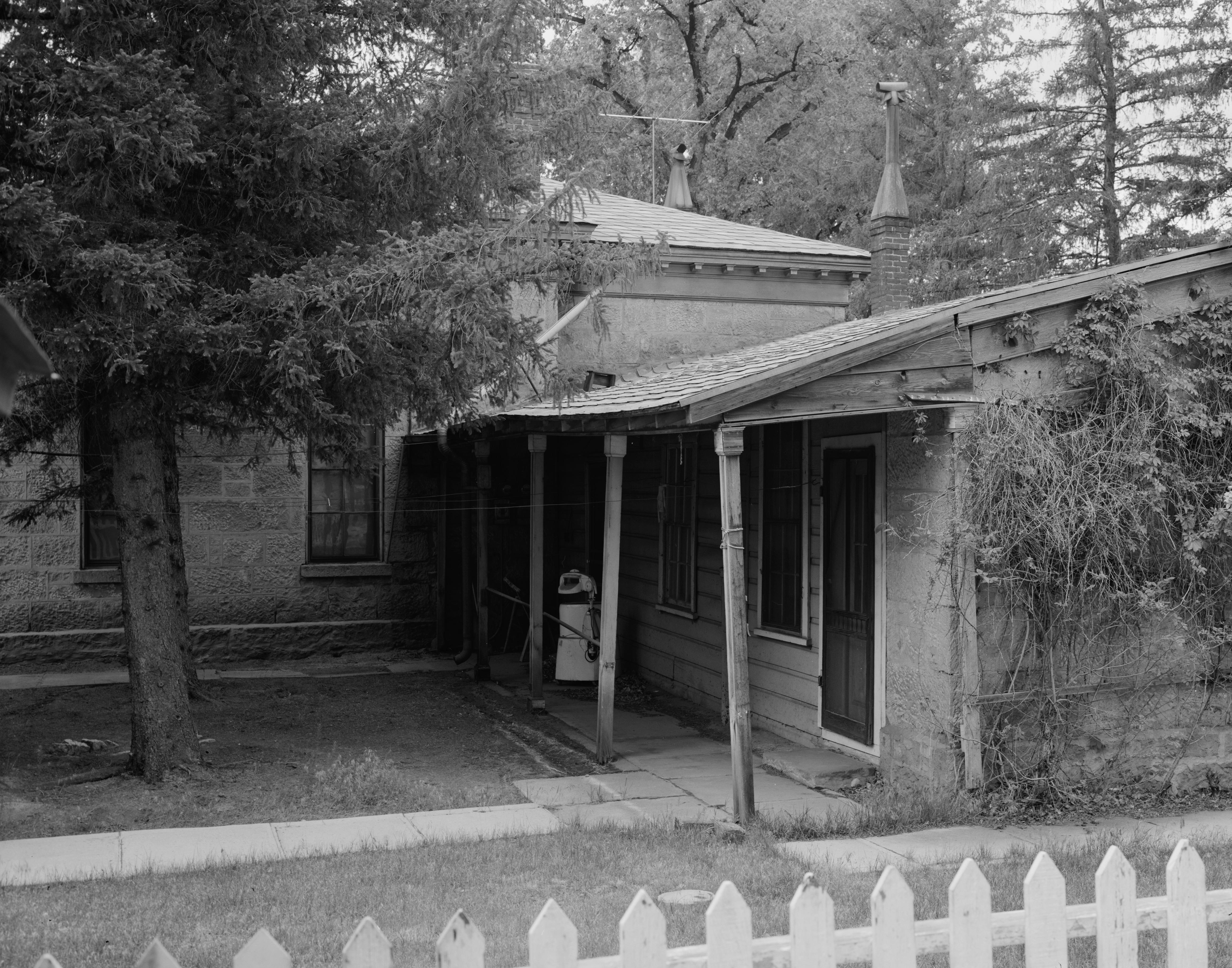
- Location: Carson City, Nevada
- Coordinates: 39°9′57″N 119°46′8″W
- Built: 1871
- Architect: Abraham Curry
- Architectural style: Vernacular with elements of Georgian and Greek Revival
- NRHP reference No.: 87000501
- Added to NRHP: March 30, 1987

In 1858, Curry traveled by stagecoach with Green, Musser, and Proctor, from California to the town of Genoa after news had spread that the western part of Utah Territory had been abandoned by Mormon settlers returning to Salt Lake City because of the Utah War. Curry's $1000 offer to buy a corner lot on which to build a store in Genoa was refused for being insufficient. After finding real estate in Genoa to be expensive, Curry moved on to the more sparsely inhabited Eagle Valley.

Curry partnered with Musser and Proctor to purchase the Eagle Ranch trading post and 865 acres of the surrounding valley for a down payment of $300 in coins out of a total sale price of $1,000. Musser and Proctor, who were both attorneys, worked to carve a separate territory from Utah, while Curry promoted the newly founded Carson City. Curry set aside and donated 10 acres (4.0 ha) of land for the site of the Nevada State Capitol.

In July 1859, Musser became president and Proctor became vice-president of the constitutional convention to establish the Territory of Nevada. Curry served as the delegate from Eagle Valley. In 1859, the discovery of the Comstock Lode east of Carson City was made public, bringing tens of thousands of miners into the area. In 1861, Curry built a 100-foot stone hotel on top of warm springs about two miles east of the city center. A large wooden eagle was placed on the top of the hotel.

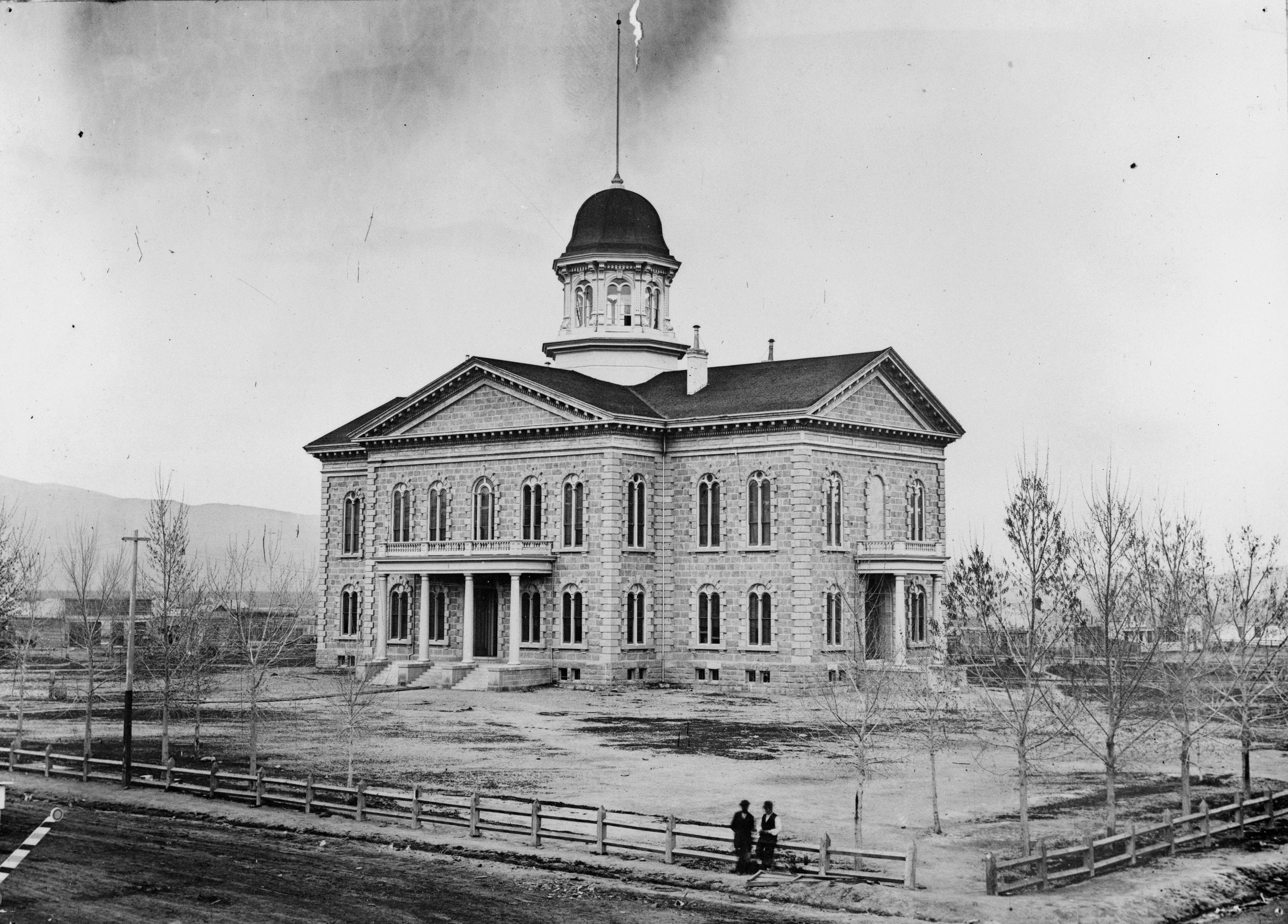
Curry donated the site upon which the Nevada State Capitol was built.

In 1862, the Nevada Territorial Legislature leased the Warm Springs Hotel from Curry to hold meetings and detain prisoners. The legislature had been using the prison quarry to provide stone material for the Nevada State Capitol while keeping costs down. In 1864, the territorial legislature paid $80,000 to acquire the hotel along with 20 acres (8.1 ha) of land from Curry, who was appointed the first warden of the facility that would become known as Nevada State Prison. In October of that year, Nevada became a state and the newly written constitution established the Lieutenant Governor of Nevada as the ex officio warden of the prison.

In 1865, the United States Congress approved the establishment of a branch of the United States Mint in Carson City. Curry was named one of the planning commissioners and became the first superintendent when the Carson City Mint began operating in 1870. Later that year, Curry left the Mint to accept a commission to supervise the building of an engine house and machine shop for the Virginia and Truckee Railroad. Construction began in 1872 with stone provided by the prison quarry. Following its completion on July 4, 1873, the engine house hosted a celebratory grand ball. The Central Pacific Railroad stated that the shops built in Carson City equaled or exceeded their own locomotive facilities in Sacramento, California.

In 1871, Curry had also designed and built a home for his family in Carson City, where he would spend the last two years of his life.

=== Death and legacy ===
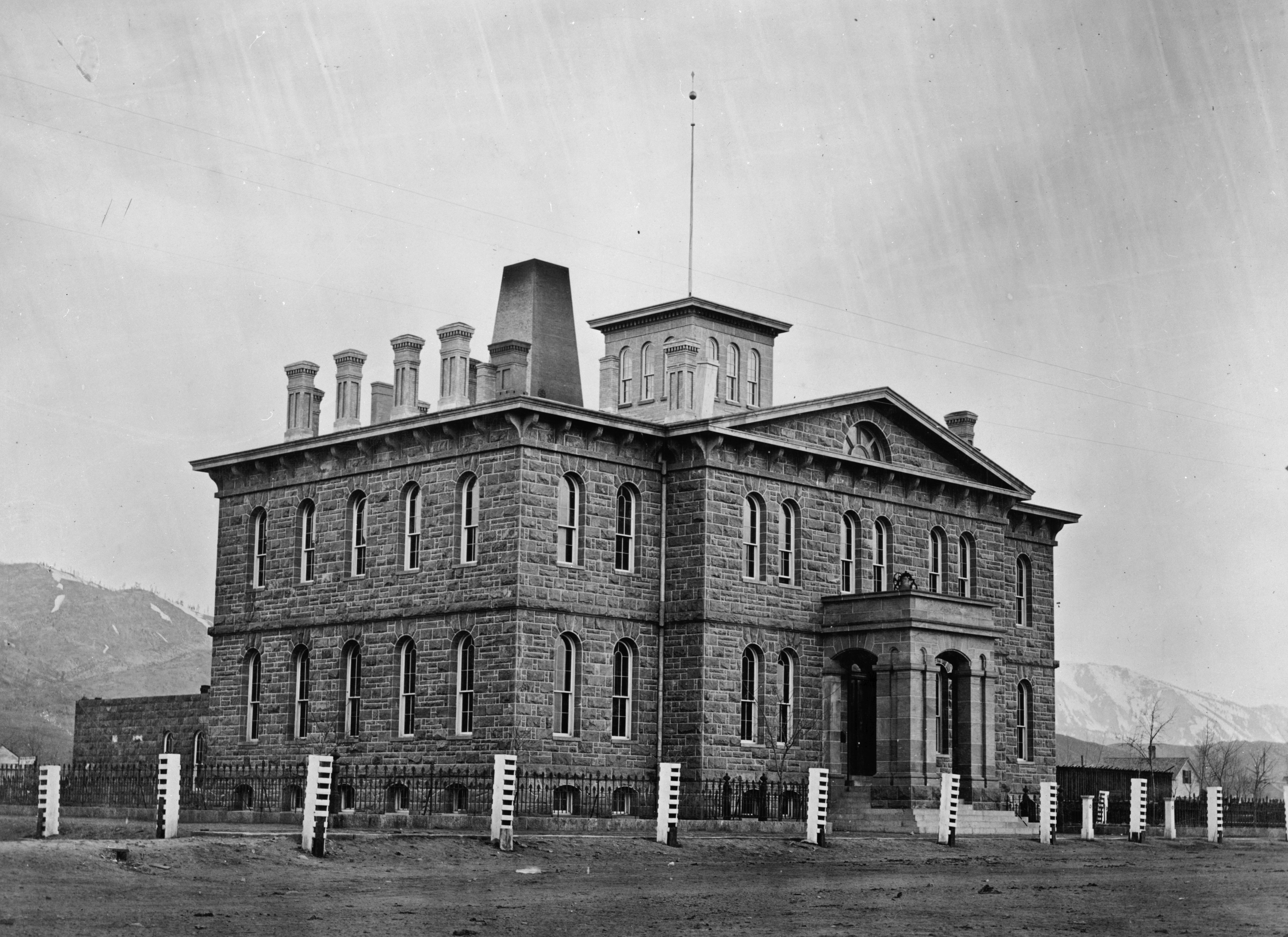
Curry was the first superintendent of the Carson City Mint.

Three months after the completion of the railroad project, Curry died of a stroke on October 19, 1873. In homage to its first superintendent, the Carson City Mint was closed that day. He was buried in Lone Mountain Cemetery in the largest funeral ever held in Carson City. A popular legend recounts that he had left only one silver dollar in his pocket for his wife Mary at the time of his death.

Abraham Curry's house was passed down to his daughter Elvira, who in turn passed it on to her son W. H. Cowan, in 1902. The house remained in the family until 1919, and is presently used as a private law office. The house is reportedly haunted by his spirit.

Abraham Curry's funeral procession has been reenacted as part of Carson City's annual Ghost Walk event, which is traditionally held during the weekend before Halloween and Nevada Day.

Curry was portrayed by the actor Mark Bennett in the 1956 episode, "The Man Who'd Bet on Anything" on the syndicated television anthology series, Death Valley Days, hosted by Stanley Andrews.

== Other offices and affiliations ==
- Founding member, Independent Order of Odd Fellows, Carson Encampment No. 2. (1867)
- Member, Masonic Lodge No. 1, Carson City
- Surveyor of Ormsby County (1871–1873)

== See also ==
- History of Nevada
- List of reportedly haunted locations in the United States
- National Register of Historic Places listings in Carson City, Nevada
