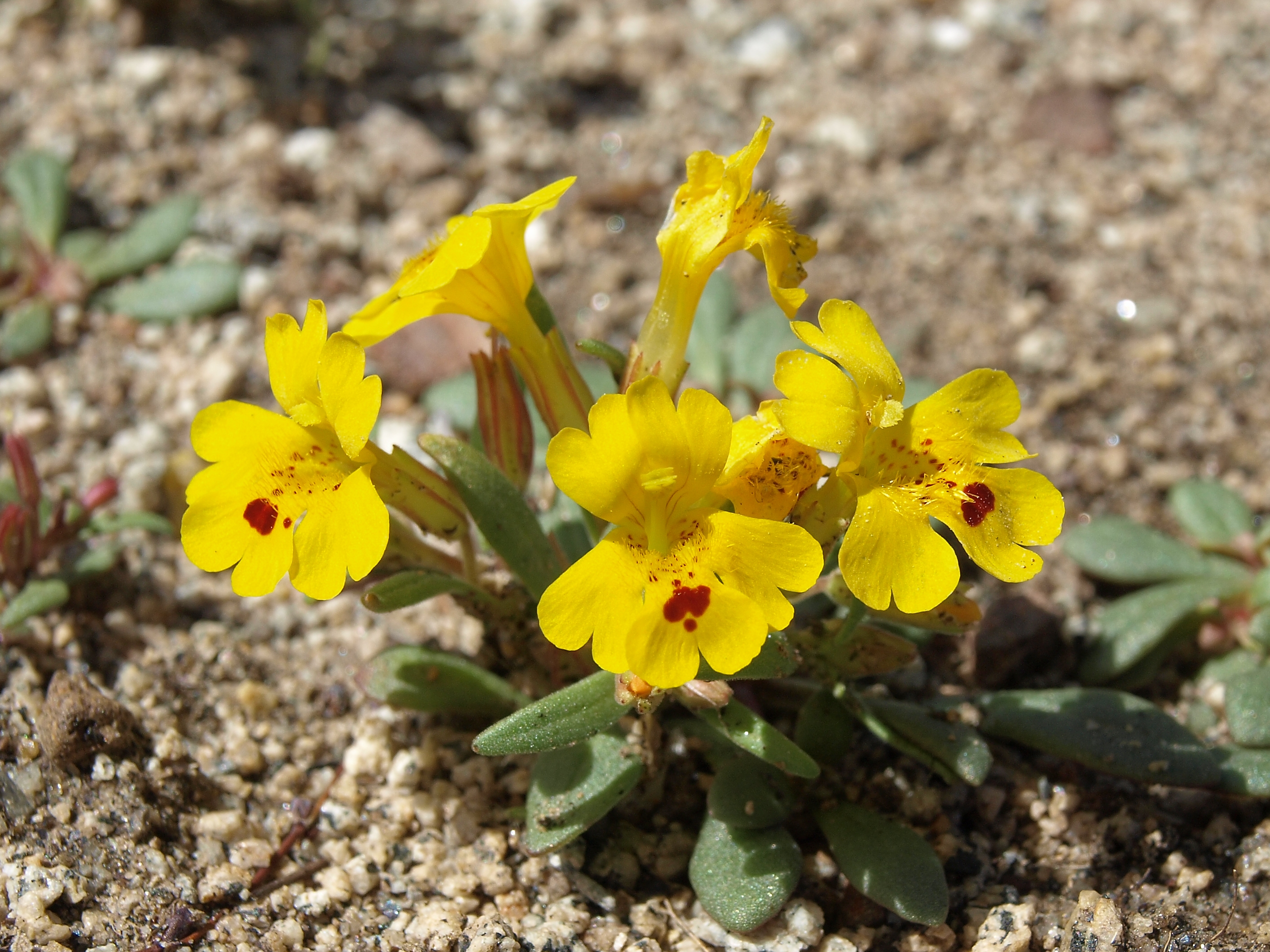

Conservation status
- Imperiled (NatureServe)

Scientific classification
- Kingdom: Plantae
- Clade: Embryophytes
- Clade: Tracheophytes
- Clade: Angiosperms
- Clade: Eudicots
- Clade: Asterids
- Order: Lamiales
- Family: Phrymaceae
- Genus: Erythranthe
- Species: E. carsonensis

Binomial name
- Erythranthe carsonensis N.S.Fraga

= Erythranthe carsonensis =

Carson Valley monkeyflower

Species of flowering plant

Erythranthe carsonensis is a species of monkeyflower known by the common name Carson Valley monkeyflower.

== Distribution ==
The species is native to Nevada and California, where its range is restricted to three valleys (Carson, Eagle, and Washoe Valleys) and the surrounding foothills. Its preferred habitat is dry, sandy soils in sagebrush and bitterbrush vegetation.

== Description ==
An annual species, 2 to 10 cm tall, bearing 1 to 20 yellow flowers. The flower is typically 0.5 to 1 inch wide, yellow with yellow hairs and tiny red dots on the palate and a large red dot on the lower limb. In small plants, the flower is often larger than the leaves and stem.

Sereno Watson first described this species as "A pretty dwarf flower of earliest spring, forming bright patches of color among the sage-brush in the lower valleys, the delicate inch-long stem seeming scarce able to sustain the absurdly disproportionate flowers that terminate it. Carson Valley, Nevada; April."

=== Taxonomy ===
Erythranthe carsonensis was separated from Erythranthe montioides in 2012 based on morphological and habitat differences.
