= Carson City, Nevada =

Capital city of Nevada, United States

- State capital and independent city
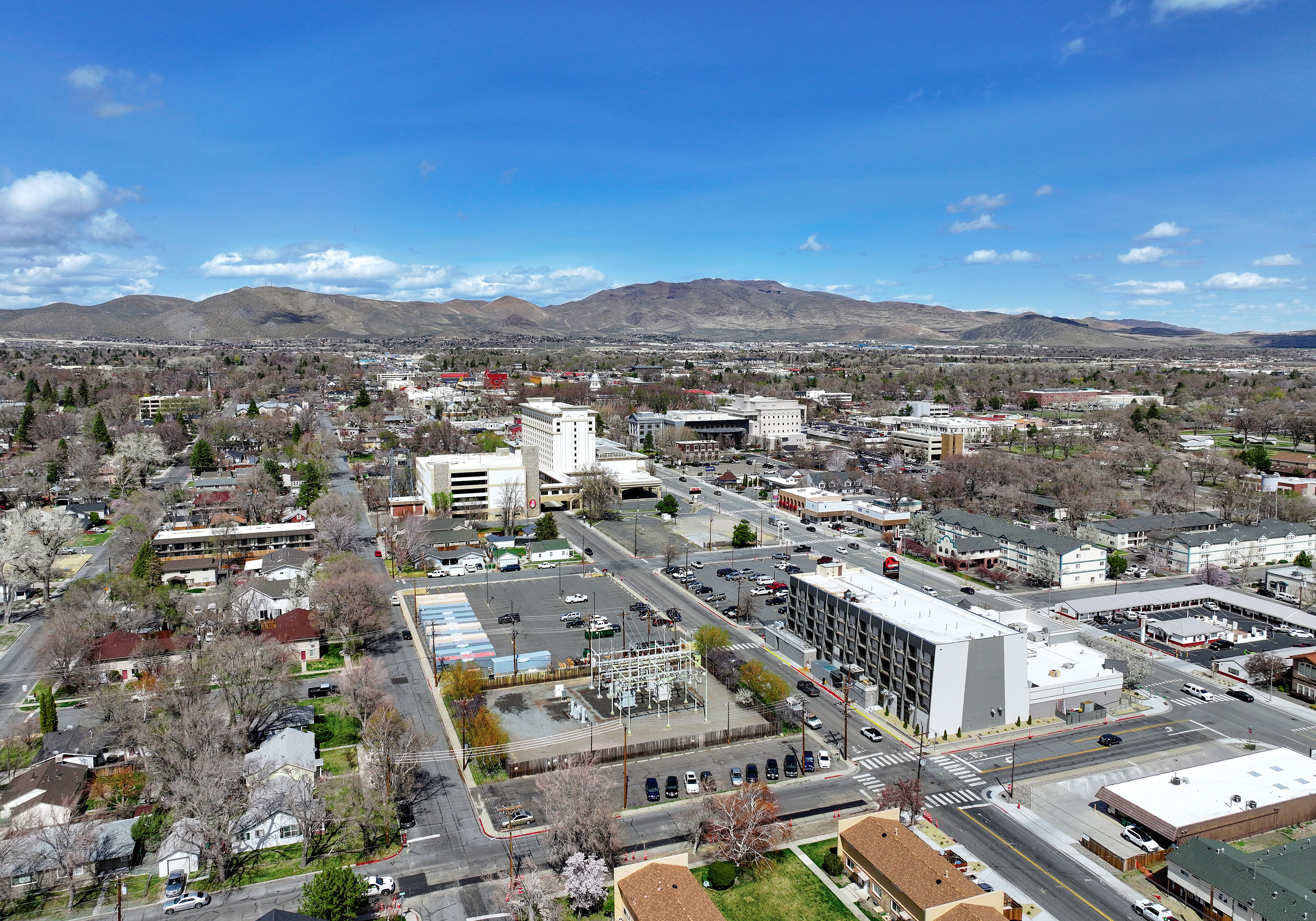
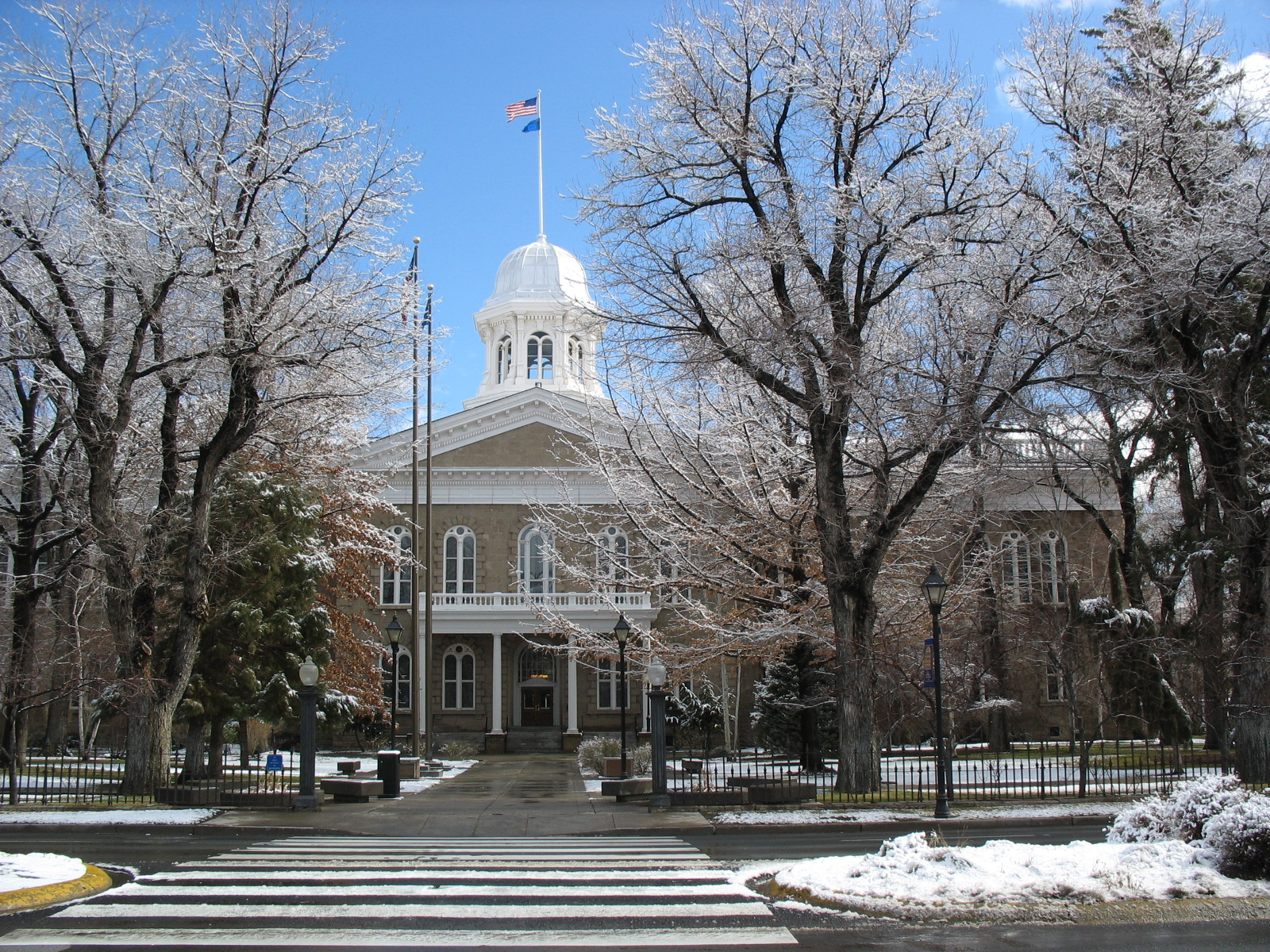
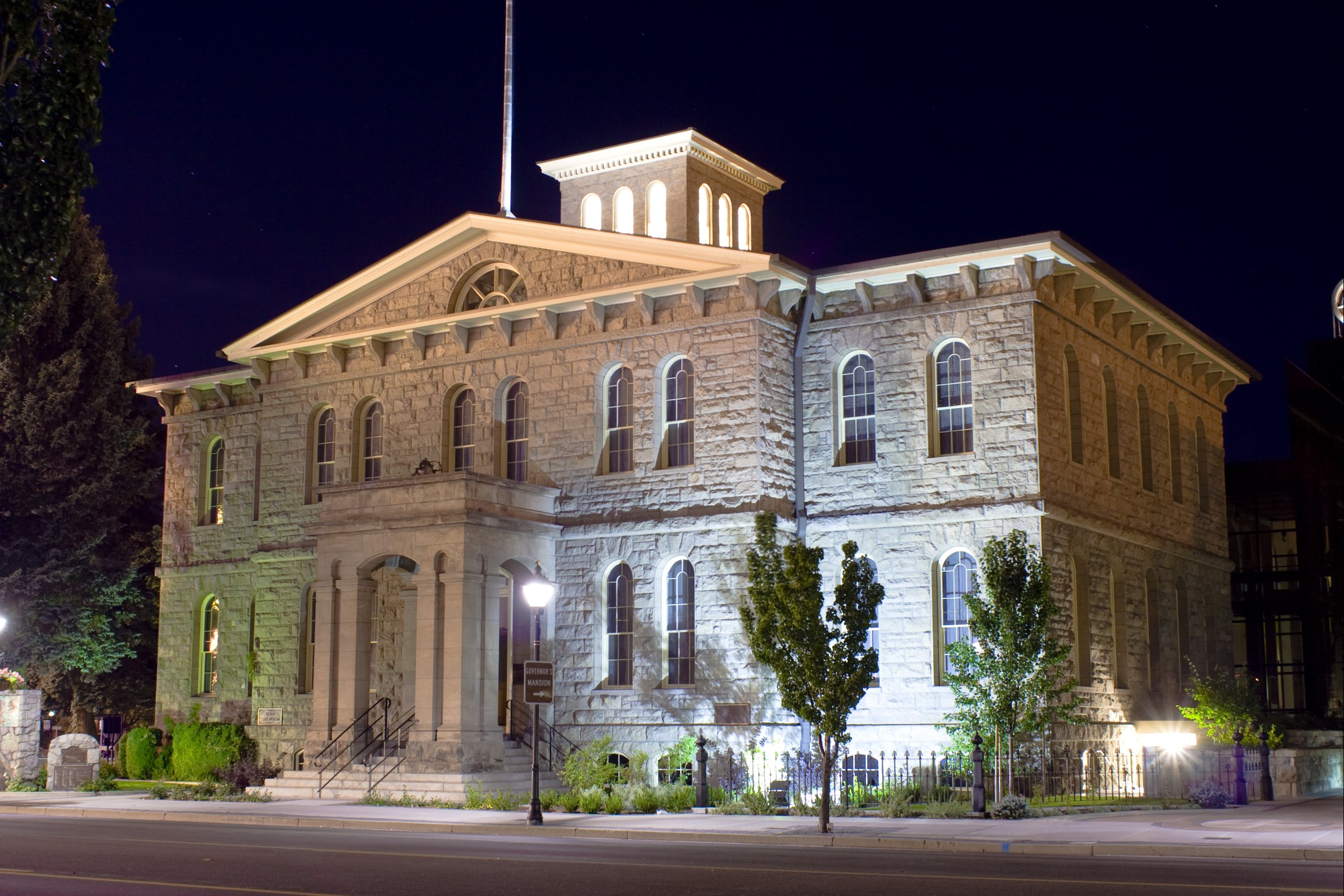
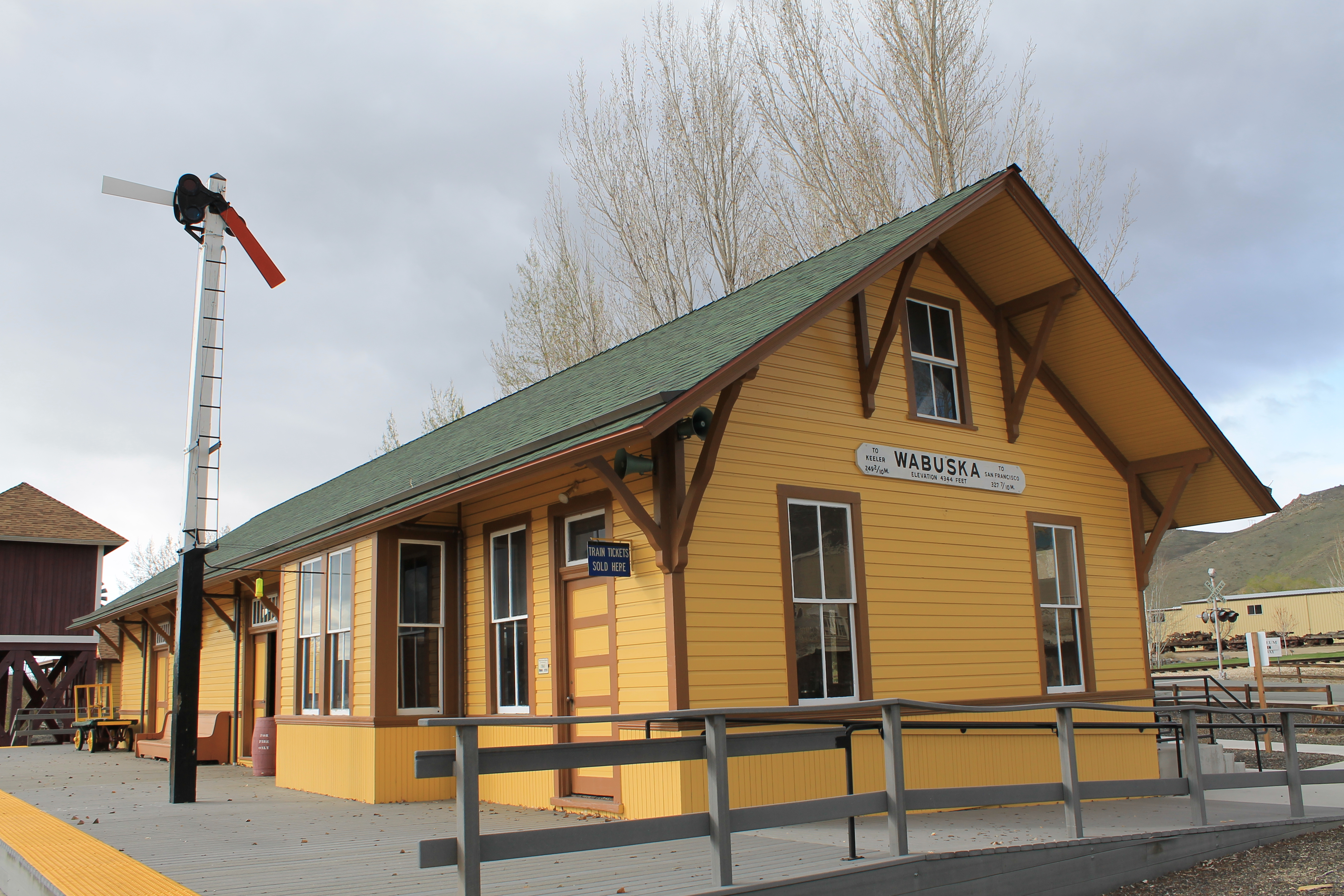
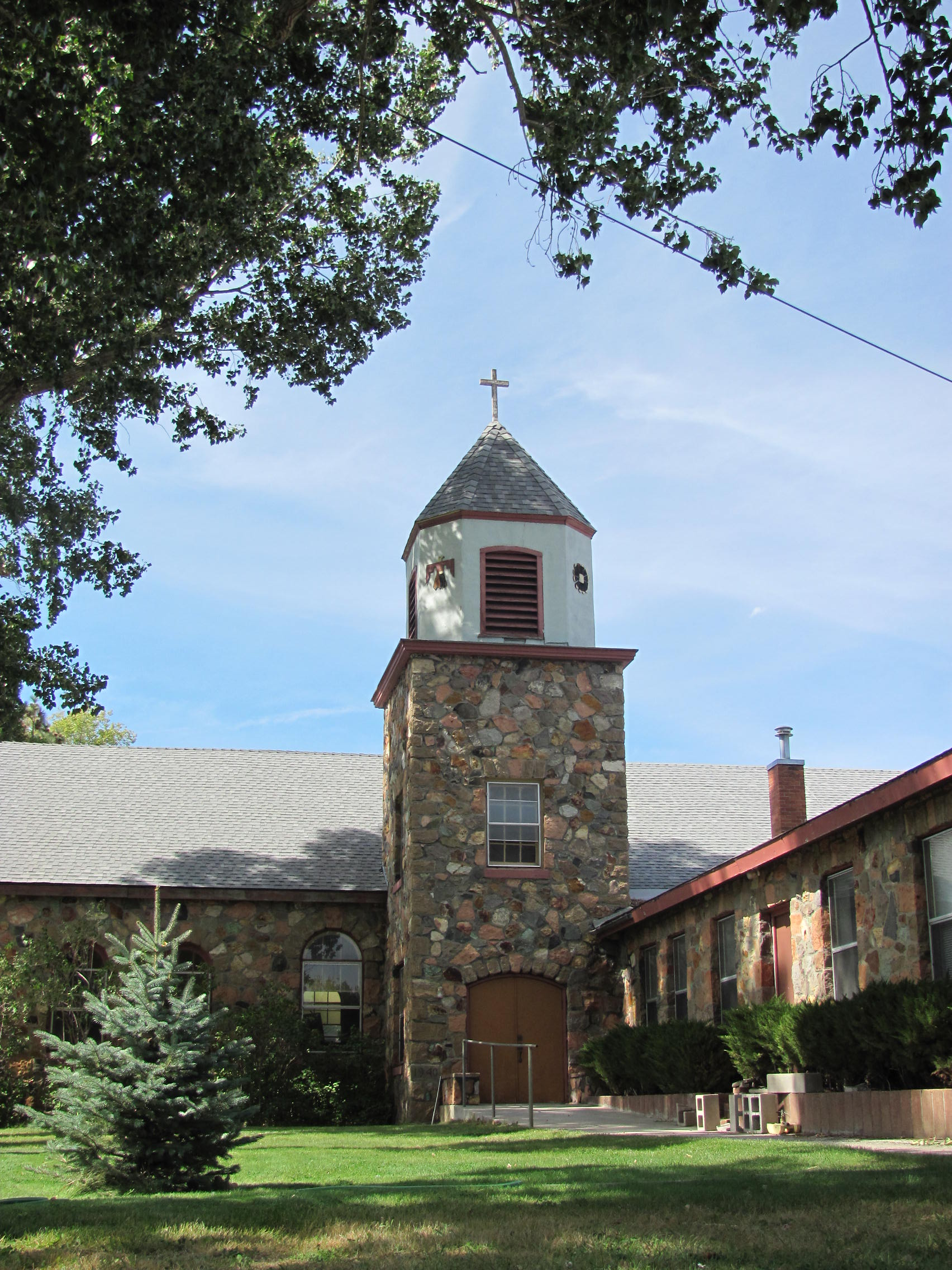
- Downtown Carson City Nevada State Capitol Carson City Mint Nevada State Railroad Museum Stewart Indian School

- Flag Seal
- Nicknames: Carson, CC, The Capitol
- Motto: Proud of its Past...Confident of its Future
- Location within Nevada

- Location in Nevada Location within the United States
- Coordinates: 39°9′52″N 119°46′1″W
- Country: United States
- State: Nevada
- Founded: 1858; 168 years ago
- Incorporated: 1875; 151 years ago
- Named for: Kit Carson

Government
  - Mayor: Lori Bagwell

Area
  - Total: 157.12 sq mi (406.94 km^{2})
  - Land: 144.53 sq mi (374.34 km^{2})
  - Water: 12.58 sq mi (32.59 km^{2}) 8.0%
- Elevation: 4,682 ft (1,427 m)

Population (2020)
  - Total: 58,639
  - Estimate (2025): 58,571▼
  - Density: 405.7/sq mi (156.65/km^{2})
- Time zone: UTC−8 (Pacific)
  - Summer (DST): UTC−7 (Pacific)
- ZIP code: 89701–89706, 89711–89714, 89721,89703
- Area code: 775
- GNIS feature ID: 863976
- Website: carsoncity.gov

Nevada Historical Marker
- Reference no.: 44

Carson City is an independent city and the capital of the U.S. state of Nevada. As of the 2020 census, the population was 58,639, making it the 6th most populous city in the state. The majority of the city's population lives in Eagle Valley, on the eastern edge of the Carson Range, a branch of the Sierra Nevada, about 30 miles (50 km) south of Reno. The city is named after the mountain man Kit Carson (1809–1868). The town began as a stopover for California-bound immigrants, but developed into a city with the Comstock Lode, a silver strike in the mountains to the northeast. The city has served as Nevada's capital since 1861, when it was still a territory. For much of its history, it was a hub for the Virginia and Truckee Railroad, although the tracks were removed in 1950.

Before 1969, Carson City was the county seat of Ormsby County. That year, after a referendum approved merging the city and the county, the state legislature issued a revised city charter that merged them into the Carson City Consolidated Municipality. With the consolidation, the city limits extend west across the Sierra Nevada to the California–Nevada state line in the middle of Lake Tahoe. Like other independent cities in the United States, it is treated as a county-equivalent for census purposes.

== History ==
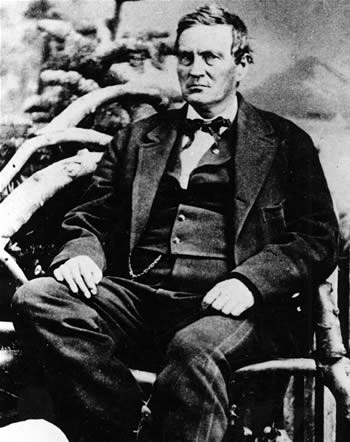
Abraham Curry

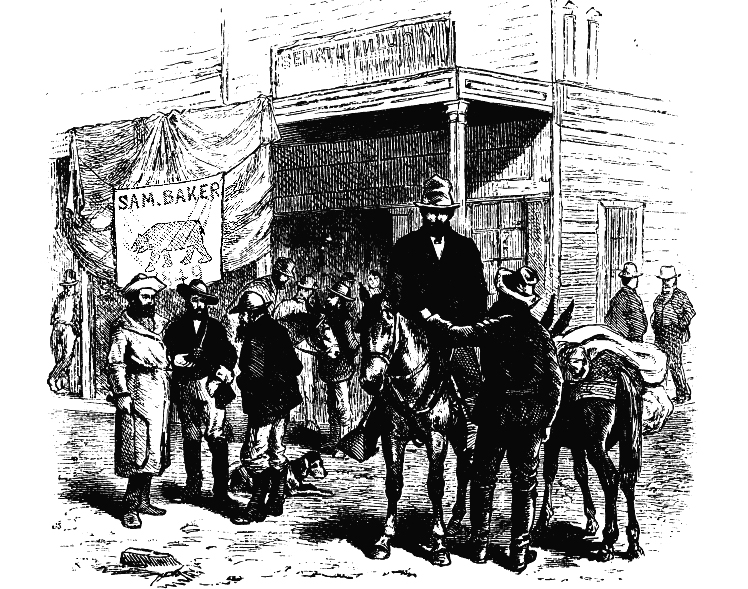
Illustration of Carson City in 1877

The Washoe people have inhabited the valley and surrounding areas for about 6,000 years.

The first European Americans to arrive in what is now known as Eagle Valley were John C. Frémont and his exploration party in January 1843. Fremont named the river flowing through the valley Carson River in honor of Kit Carson (1809–1868), the mountain man, explorer, and scout he had hired for his expedition. Later, settlers named the area Washoe in reference to the indigenous people.

By 1851, the Eagle Station ranch along the Carson River was a trading post and stop-over for westbound travelers and wagons on the California Trail's Carson Branch, which ran through Eagle Valley. The valley and the trading post received their name from a bald eagle that was hunted and killed by one of the early settlers and was featured pinned on a wall inside the post.

As the area was part of the larger Utah Territory (1850–1896), it was governed from the territorial (and later state) capital of Salt Lake City on the eastern shore of the Great Salt Lake, where the territorial government was headquartered there several hundred miles further east with Mormon (The Church of Jesus Christ of Latter-day Saints) President Brigham Young (1801–1877), as first Governor of Utah. Early settlers bristled at the control by Mormon-influenced officials and desired the creation of the provisional Nevada Territory with Isaac Roop (1822–1869, served 1859–1861), as provisional Governor. A vigilante group of influential settlers, headed by Abraham Curry (1815–1873), sought a site for a capital city for the envisioned future separate territory. In 1858, Abraham Curry bought Eagle Station and the settlement was thereafter renamed Carson City. Curry and several other partners had Eagle Valley surveyed for development. Curry decided Carson City would someday serve as the capital city and left a 10-acre (40,000 m^{2}) plot in the center of town for a capitol building.

After gold and silver ore were discovered in 1859 on the nearby newly named Comstock Lode, Carson City's population began to grow. Curry built the Warm Springs Hotel a mile to the east of the town center. When new territorial governor James W. Nye (1815–1876, served 1861–1864), traveled east to Nevada, he chose Carson City as the territorial capital instead of earlier Genoa, which had functioned temporarily as such for the past few years. Influenced by Carson City lawyer William M. Stewart (1827–1909), who escorted him from the port of San Francisco, California, where he arrived onboard a passenger steamboat liner, then journeying uphill past Sacramento to Nevada. As such, Carson City bested Virginia City and American Flat. Curry loaned the Warm Springs Hotel to the territorial Legislature as a temporary meeting hall. The Legislature named Carson City to be the county seat of Ormsby County and also selected the hotel as the territorial prison, with Curry serving as its first warden. Today, the property is still part of the state prison.

When Nevada became the 36th state in 1864 during the American Civil War (1861–1865), Carson City was confirmed as Nevada's permanent state capital. Carson City's development was no longer dependent on the mining industry and instead became a thriving commercial center. The Virginia and Truckee Railroad was built between Virginia City and Carson City. A log flume was also built from the Sierra Nevada mountain range into Carson City. The current Nevada State Capitol building was constructed from 1869 to 1871. The United States Mint also operated its branch of the Carson City Mint between the years of 1870 and 1893, which struck gold and silver coins of United States currency. People came from China during that time, many to work on the transcontinental railroad being constructed. Some of them owned businesses and taught school. By 1880, almost a thousand Chinese people, "one for every five Caucasians", lived in Carson City.

Carson City's population and transportation traffic decreased when the Central Pacific Railroad built a branch line through Donner Pass to connect with the Carson and Colorado Railroad. The new branch bypassed the Virginia & Truckee line and ran too far north to benefit Carson City. The city was slightly revitalized with the mining booms in nearby Tonopah and Goldfield. The United States federal building (now renamed the Paul Laxalt Building) was completed in 1890 as was the Stewart Indian School. Even those developments could not prevent its population from dropping to just over 1,500 people by 1930. Carson City resigned itself to small city status, advertising itself as "America's smallest capital". The city slowly grew after World War II (1939/1941–1945); by 1960, it had reached its mining boom-town era population size of 80 years before.

=== 20th-century revitalization and growth ===
In 1931, gambling was legalized in Nevada, which increased tourism to Carson City.

In the late 1940s, discussions began about merging Ormsby County and Carson City. By then, the county was little more than Carson City and a few hamlets to the west. However, they never got beyond the planning stages until the 1960s.By the 1960 census, all but 2,900 of the county's residents lived in Carson City. In 1966, a statewide referendum approved the merger. The required constitutional amendment was passed in 1968. On April 1, 1969, Ormsby County and Carson City officially merged as the Consolidated Municipality of Carson City. With this consolidation, Carson City absorbed former town sites such as Empire City, which had grown up in the 1860s as a milling center along the Carson River and current U.S. Route 50. Carson City could now advertise itself as one of America's largest state capitals with its 146 square miles (380 km^{2}) of city limits.

In 1991, the city adopted a downtown master plan, specifying no building within 500 feet (150 meters) of the Capitol would surpass it in height. This plan effectively prohibited future high-rise development in the center of downtown. The Ormsby House is the tallest building in downtown Carson City, at a height of 117 feet (36 m). The structure was completed in 1972.

== Geography ==
Most of the city proper resides in the Eagle Valley. The Carson River flows from Douglas County through the southwestern edge of both the valley and Carson City. Since the consolidation, the city limits today include several small populated areas outside of this valley. Today the city limits include several peaks in the Sierra Nevada, small portions of both the Virginia Range and the Pine Nut Mountains and portions of Marlette Lake and Lake Tahoe. The highest elevation in city limits is Snow Valley Peak at an elevation of 9,214 feet (2,808 m). Carson City is one of two state capitals that border another state, the other being Trenton, New Jersey.

=== Climate ===
Climate chart for Carson City

Carson City features a cold semi-arid climate (Köppen: BSk, Trewartha: BSak) with cold winters and hot summers. The city is in a high desert river valley approximately 4,802 feet (1,464 m) above sea level. There are four fairly distinct seasons. Winters see typically light to moderate snowfall, with an average of 14.0 inches (0.36 m), with the most snowfall being 82.1 inches (2.1 m) from July 1951 to June 1952 and the least 3.1 inches (0.079 m) from July 2002 to June 2003. Most precipitation occurs in winter and spring, with summer and fall being fairly dry, drier than neighboring California. The wettest “rain year” was from July 1937 to June 1938 with 19.36 inches (491.7 mm) and the driest from July 1971 to June 1972 with 3.48 inches (88.4 mm). The most precipitation in one month occurred in December 1955 when 10.39 inches or 263.9 millimetres, fell and the most snowfall 34.5 inches or 0.88 metres in March 1952. The most precipitation in one day has been 3.12 inches or 79.2 millimetres on November 19 of 1950.

There are 39.5 afternoons of 90 °F (32.2 °C)+ highs annually, with 100 °F (37.8 °C)+ temperatures occurring 1.2 afternoons per year. The hottest month has been July 2021 with an average of 77.6 °F (25.3 °C), the hottest temperature 107 °F (41.7 °C) on July 19, 1931, and the highest minimum 75 °F (23.9 °C) on August 1, 2022.

There are 125 mornings with lows below freezing, but afternoon maxima top 50 °F or 10 °C on all but 52 days, and top freezing on all but five. Temperatures below 0 °F or −17.8 °C are very rare, occurring about twice per winter and frequently not occurring at all. The coldest temperature in Carson City has been −27 °F or −32.8 °C on January 21, 1937, the lowest maximum 5 °F or −15 °C on December 12, 1932, and December 22, 1990, and the coldest month January 1949 with a mean temperature of 12.6 °F (−10.8 °C), although January 1937 at 14.9 °F (−9.5 °C) is the only other month below 21 °F or −6.1 °C.

The average temperature in Carson City increased by 4.1 °F (2.3 °C) between 1984 and 2014, a greater change than in any other city in the United States.

Climate data for Carson City, Nevada, 1991–2020 normals, extremes 1893–present
Month	Jan	Feb	Mar	Apr	May	Jun	Jul	Aug	Sep	Oct	Nov	Dec	Year
Record high °F (°C)	72 (22)	76 (24)	81 (27)	88 (31)	94 (34)	101 (38)	107 (42)	105 (41)	103 (39)	93 (34)	79 (26)	75 (24)	107 (42)
Mean maximum °F (°C)	59.3 (15.2)	62.4 (16.9)	70.7 (21.5)	77.9 (25.5)	85.6 (29.8)	93.6 (34.2)	99.0 (37.2)	96.5 (35.8)	91.9 (33.3)	82.7 (28.2)	70.7 (21.5)	60.5 (15.8)	99.7 (37.6)
Mean daily maximum °F (°C)	45.5 (7.5)	49.5 (9.7)	56.2 (13.4)	61.7 (16.5)	70.4 (21.3)	80.9 (27.2)	89.5 (31.9)	87.8 (31.0)	80.7 (27.1)	68.0 (20.0)	54.5 (12.5)	44.6 (7.0)	65.8 (18.8)
Daily mean °F (°C)	34.8 (1.6)	38.3 (3.5)	43.9 (6.6)	48.8 (9.3)	56.6 (13.7)	65.0 (18.3)	72.1 (22.3)	70.2 (21.2)	63.1 (17.3)	52.2 (11.2)	41.4 (5.2)	34.2 (1.2)	51.7 (10.9)
Mean daily minimum °F (°C)	24.1 (−4.4)	27.1 (−2.7)	31.6 (−0.2)	35.8 (2.1)	42.9 (6.1)	49.2 (9.6)	54.8 (12.7)	52.5 (11.4)	45.6 (7.6)	36.3 (2.4)	28.4 (−2.0)	23.9 (−4.5)	37.7 (3.2)
Mean minimum °F (°C)	6.9 (−13.9)	11.7 (−11.3)	17.4 (−8.1)	22.3 (−5.4)	29.7 (−1.3)	35.8 (2.1)	44.4 (6.9)	42.1 (5.6)	34.3 (1.3)	21.8 (−5.7)	11.4 (−11.4)	6.2 (−14.3)	0.6 (−17.4)
Record low °F (°C)	−27 (−33)	−22 (−30)	−5 (−21)	3 (−16)	18 (−8)	25 (−4)	33 (1)	26 (−3)	17 (−8)	6 (−14)	−5 (−21)	−26 (−32)	−27 (−33)
Average precipitation inches (mm)	1.72 (44)	1.48 (38)	1.24 (31)	0.51 (13)	0.51 (13)	0.37 (9.4)	0.18 (4.6)	0.14 (3.6)	0.24 (6.1)	0.55 (14)	0.90 (23)	1.50 (38)	9.34 (237)
Average snowfall inches (cm)	3.6 (9.1)	1.7 (4.3)	1.6 (4.1)	0.0 (0.0)	0.0 (0.0)	0.0 (0.0)	0.0 (0.0)	0.0 (0.0)	0.0 (0.0)	0.0 (0.0)	0.7 (1.8)	6.4 (16)	14.0 (36)
Average precipitation days (≥ 0.01 in)	6.2	5.6	4.8	3.2	3.4	1.7	0.9	1.0	1.1	2.4	3.3	4.8	38.4
Average snowy days (≥ 0.1 in)	1.8	1.4	1.0	0.1	0.0	0.0	0.0	0.0	0.0	0.0	0.6	1.4	6.3
Source 1: NOAA
Source 2: National Weather Service

=== Places of interest ===
==== Museums ====
- Nevada State Capitol – original capitol still housing the governor's offices with museum exhibits
- Nevada State Museum – former branch of the United States Mint featuring rock, mining and prehistoric exhibits, and a recreated Wild West village
- Nevada State Railroad Museum – featuring the Inyo locomotive and relocated Wabuska Railroad Station
- Stewart Indian School – museum collection includes items from former faculty, students and school
- Foreman-Roberts House Museum – Gothic Revival architecture, tours available.
- Sears–Ferris House (not open to public) – home of George Washington Gale Ferris Jr., inventor of the Ferris wheel

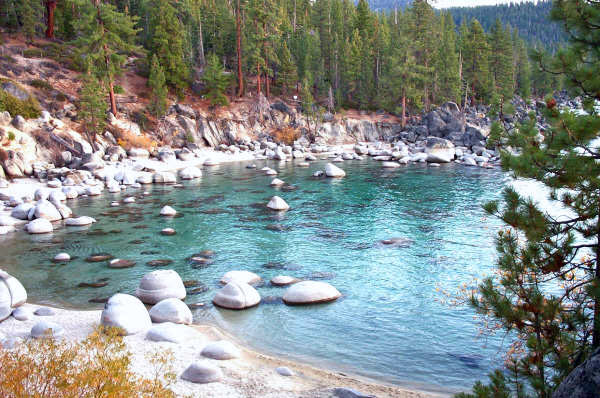
Secret Harbor Beach, Lake Tahoe

- Children's Museum of Northern Nevada – Carson City

==== Open land ====
- Silver Saddle Ranch
- Mexican Dam – 1860s stone dam across the Carson River
- Prison Hill – California Trail historic markers, location of the Stewart "S"
- Carson Aquatic Trail
- Humboldt-Toiyabe National Forest (Carson Ranger District)
  - Kings Canyon Falls
  - Snow Valley Peak – 9,214 ft (2,808 m) – highest point within Carson City
- Tahoe Rim Trail
- Lake Tahoe–Nevada State Park
- Lake Tahoe beachfront (several beaches along Lake Tahoe lie within the city limits)
  - Chimney Beach
  - Secret Harbor
  - Whale Beach
  - Skunk Harbor
- Washoe Lake State Park – borders city to the north
- "C Hill" – hill featuring the Carson City "C" and a giant American Flag

== Demographics ==
Carson City is the smallest of the United States' 366 metropolitan statistical areas.

Historical population
Census	Pop.	Note	%±
1850	714		—
1860	714		0.0%
1870	3,042		326.1%
1880	4,229		39.0%
1890	3,950		−6.6%
1900	2,100		−46.8%
1910	2,466		17.4%
1920	1,685		−31.7%
1930	1,596		−5.3%
1940	2,478		55.3%
1950	3,082		24.4%
1960	5,163		67.5%
1970	15,468		199.6%
1980	32,022		107.0%
1990	40,443		26.3%
2000	52,457		29.7%
2010	55,274		5.4%
2020	58,639		6.1%
2025 (est.)	58,571	▼	−0.1%
U.S. Decennial Census; 1790–1960 1900–1990; 1990–2000

=== Racial and ethnic composition ===
Carson City city, Nevada – Racial and ethnic composition Note: the US Census treats Hispanic/Latino as an ethnic category. This table excludes Latinos from the racial categories and assigns them to a separate category. Hispanics/Latinos may be of any race.
Race / Ethnicity (NH = Non-Hispanic)	Pop 1980	Pop 1990	Pop 2000	Pop 2010	Pop 2020	% 1980	% 1990	% 2000	% 2010	% 2020
White alone (NH)	28,555	35,084	41,204	39,083	37,064	89.17%	86.75%	78.55%	70.71%	63.21%
Black or African American alone (NH)	435	650	909	1,003	1,079	1.36%	1.61%	1.73%	1.81%	1.84%
Native American or Alaska Native alone (NH)	1,481	1,026	1,126	1,096	1,072	4.62%	2.54%	2.15%	1.98%	1.83%
Asian alone (NH)	276	547	895	1,139	1,358	0.86%	1.35%	1.71%	2.06%	2.32%
Native Hawaiian or Pacific Islander alone (NH)	x	x	65	91	110	x	x	0.12%	0.16%	0.19%
Other race alone (NH)	0	26	65	67	292	0.00%	0.06%	0.12%	0.12%	0.50%
Mixed race or Multiracial (NH)	x	x	727	1,018	2,794	x	x	1.39%	1.84%	4.76%
Hispanic or Latino (any race)	1,275	3,110	7,466	11,777	14,870	3.98%	7.69%	14.23%	21.31%	25.36%
Total	32,022	40,443	52,457	55,274	58,639	100.00%	100.00%	100.00%	100.00%	100.00%

=== 2020 census ===
As of the 2020 census, the city had a population of 58,639. The median age was 43.9 years. 19.2% of residents were under the age of 18 and 22.1% of residents were 65 years of age or older. For every 100 females there were 105.6 males, and for every 100 females age 18 and over there were 106.1 males age 18 and over. 94.0% of residents lived in urban areas, while 6.0% lived in rural areas.

The racial makeup of the city was 68.0% White, 1.9% Black or African American, 2.5% American Indian and Alaska Native, 2.4% Asian, 0.2% Native Hawaiian and Pacific Islander, 12.1% from some other race, and 12.9% from two or more races. Hispanic or Latino residents of any race comprised 25.4% of the population.

The most reported ancestries in 2020 were Mexican (19.6%), English (17%), German (15.3%), Irish (14%), Italian (5.5%), and Scottish (3.8%).

There were 23,419 households in the city, of which 26.9% had children under the age of 18 living with them and 28.2% had a female householder with no spouse or partner present. About 31.4% of all households were made up of individuals and 15.8% had someone living alone who was 65 years of age or older.

There were 24,564 housing units, of which 4.7% were vacant. Among occupied housing units, 59.0% were owner-occupied and 41.0% were renter-occupied. The homeowner vacancy rate was 1.0% and the rental vacancy rate was 5.2%.

=== 2010 census ===
As of the 2010 census, there were 55,274 people, 20,171 households, and 13,252 families residing in the city. The population density was 366 people per square mile (141 people/km^{2}). There were 21,283 housing units at an average density of 148 per square mile (57/km^{2}). The racial makeup of the city was 81.1% White, 1.9% Black or African American, 2.4% Native American, 2.1% Asian, 0.2% Pacific Islander, 9.4% from other races, and 2.9% from two or more races. 21% of the population were Hispanic or Latino of any race.

=== 2000 census ===
As of the 2000 census, there were 20,171 households, out of which 29.8% had children under the age of 18 living with them, 50.0% were married couples living together, 11.0% had a female householder with no husband present, and 34.3% were non-families. 27.8% of all households were made up of individuals, and 11.00% had someone living alone who was 65 years of age or older. The average household size was 2.44 and the average family size was 2.97. The city's age distribution was: 23.4% under the age of 18, 7.9% from 18 to 24, 28.9% from 25 to 44, 24.9% from 45 to 64, and 14.9% who were 65 years of age or older. The median age was 39 years. For every 100 females, there were 106.9 males. For every 100 females age 18 and over, there were 108.2 males.

Data from the 2000 census indicates the median income for a household in the city was $41,809, and the median income for a family was $49,570. Males had a median income of $35,296 versus $27,418 for females. The per capita income for the city was $20,943. 10.0% of the population and 6.9% of families were below the poverty line. Out of the total population, 13.7% of those under the age of 18 and 5.8% of those 65 and older were living below the poverty line.

=== Languages ===
As of 2010, 82.3% (42,697) of Carson City residents age 5 and older spoke English at home as a first language, while 14.1% (7,325) spoke Spanish, 0.6% (318) French, and numerous Indo-Aryan languages were spoken as a main language by 0.5% (261) of the population over the age of five. In total, 17.7% (9,174) of Carson City's population age 5 and older spoke a first language other than English.

== Government and politics ==
Ormsby County consolidated with Carson City in 1969, and the county simultaneously dissolved. The city is now governed by a five-member board of supervisors, consisting of a mayor and four supervisors. All members are elected at-large, but each of the four supervisors must reside in respective wards, numbered 1 through 4. The mayor and supervisors serve four year terms. Elections are staggered so the mayor and the supervisors from Wards 2 and Ward 4 are elected in presidential election years, and the supervisors from Wards 1 and 3 are elected in the even-numbered years in between (i.e., the same year as gubernatorial elections). Like counties in Nevada, Carson City retains an elected Sheriff with local law enforcement provided by the Carson City Sheriff's Office.

The city is generally considered a Republican stronghold, often voting for Republicans by wide margins. In 2004, George W. Bush defeated John Kerry 57–40%. In 2008, however, Barack Obama became the first Democrat since 1964 to win Ormsby County/Carson City, defeating John McCain 49–48%, by 204 votes, a margin of under 1%. In the years since Obama's landslide Democrats have maintained around 40% of the presidential vote. Downballot, Carson City is still less competitive and has not voted for a Democratic governor since 1990 when Bob Miller won every county.

United States presidential election results for Ormsby County/Carson City, Nevada
Year	Republican		Democratic		Third party(ies)	
Year	No.	%	No.	%	No.	%
1904	409	60.15%	218	32.06%	53	7.79%
1908	350	46.60%	343	45.67%	58	7.72%
1912	150	22.22%	294	43.56%	231	34.22%
1916	534	43.52%	610	49.71%	83	6.76%
1920	592	57.81%	413	40.33%	19	1.86%
1924	413	44.31%	415	44.53%	104	11.16%
1928	590	58.07%	426	41.93%	0	0.00%
1932	486	45.63%	579	54.37%	0	0.00%
1936	533	41.71%	745	58.29%	0	0.00%
1940	748	48.79%	785	51.21%	0	0.00%
1944	841	55.84%	665	44.16%	0	0.00%
1948	1,095	60.80%	681	37.81%	25	1.39%
1952	1,653	74.06%	579	25.94%	0	0.00%
1956	1,749	68.03%	822	31.97%	0	0.00%
1960	1,946	60.27%	1,283	39.73%	0	0.00%
1964	1,997	48.40%	2,129	51.60%	0	0.00%
1968	3,169	56.58%	1,770	31.60%	662	11.82%
1972	5,396	71.79%	2,120	28.21%	0	0.00%
1976	5,282	54.11%	3,874	39.69%	605	6.20%
1980	8,389	66.81%	2,769	22.05%	1,398	11.13%
1984	9,477	70.01%	3,790	28.00%	269	1.99%
1988	9,701	63.44%	5,088	33.27%	502	3.28%
1992	7,302	38.83%	6,035	32.10%	5,466	29.07%
1996	9,168	48.73%	7,269	38.64%	2,377	12.63%
2000	11,084	56.98%	7,354	37.81%	1,014	5.21%
2004	13,171	57.00%	9,441	40.86%	494	2.14%
2008	11,419	48.22%	11,623	49.08%	638	2.69%
2012	12,394	53.15%	10,291	44.13%	634	2.72%
2016	13,125	52.47%	9,610	38.42%	2,281	9.12%
2020	16,113	54.18%	12,735	42.82%	891	3.00%
2024	16,873	54.31%	13,375	43.05%	820	2.64%

Carson City, being the state capital, has seen many political protests and demonstrations.

In an attempt to either make a proposed spent nuclear fuel storage facility at Yucca Mountain prohibitively expensive (by raising property tax rates to the maximum allowed) or to allow the state to collect the potential federal payments of property taxes on the facility, the state government in 1987 carved Yucca Mountain out of Nye County and created a new county with no residents out of the area surrounding Yucca called Bullfrog County. Carson City became the county seat of Bullfrog County, even though it was not in Bullfrog County and is more than 100 miles (160 km) from Yucca Mountain. A state judge found the process unconstitutional in 1989, and Bullfrog County's territory was retroceded to Nye County.

== Culture ==
=== Sports and recreation ===
Carson City has never hosted any professional team sports. However, a variety of sports are offered at parks and recreation. Many neighborhood parks offer a wide variety of features including picnic tables, beaches, restrooms, fishing, softball, basketball hoops, ponds, tennis, and volleyball. The largest park is Mills Park, which has a total land area of 51 acres (0.21 km^{2}) and includes the 2 ft (610 mm) narrow-gauge Carson & Mills Park Railroad. While there are no ski slopes within Carson City, the city is near the Heavenly Mountain Resort, Diamond Peak and Mount Rose Ski Tahoe skiing areas. Carson City houses the 2024 #1 rated disc golf course in Nevada, Stadium Course At Carson Ridge.

== Notable people ==
Carson City has served as one of the state's centers for politics and business. Every state governor since Denver S. Dickerson has resided in the Governor's Mansion in Carson City. The following personalities took up residence in Carson City at some point in their lives.

- Mark Amodei, U.S. representative for Nevada
- Mackena Bell, racing driver
- Duane Leroy Bliss, timber businessman
- Orion Clemens, Secretary of Nevada Territory
- Steven S. Coughlin, American epidemiologist and author
- John Cradlebaugh, first Delegate to the U.S. House of Representatives from Nevada Territory
- Abraham Curry, founding father of Carson City and early politician
- Dat So La Lee, Native American basket weaver and artist
- Nellie Verrill Mighels Davis, journalist
- David Eddings, best selling author of fantasy novels
- George Washington Gale Ferris Jr., inventor of the Ferris wheel
- Ellen Hopkins, author
- Paul Laxalt, former Governor and U.S. Senator
- Greg LeMond, two-time World Champion road racing cyclist, and three-time winner of the Tour de France
- Alice Little, Irish-American sex-worker and advocate
- David Lundquist, Major League baseball player (Chicago White Sox)
- Maurice E. McLoughlin, two-time U.S. Open champion, member of International Tennis Hall of Fame
- Henry Rust Mighels, journalist, politician, first husband of Nellie Verrill Mighels Davis
- Hank Monk, stagecoach driver
- William Ormsby, soldier and namesake of Ormsby County and Ormsby House
- Donovan Osborne, Major League baseball player (St. Louis Cardinals)
- Darrell Rasner, Major League baseball player (New York Yankees)
- Don Tatro, member of the Nevada Senate
- Mark Twain, author (lived with his brother Orion Clemens)
- Matt Williams, Major League third baseman (San Francisco Giants, Cleveland Indians, and Arizona Diamondbacks)
- Sarah Winnemucca, Native American activist and author

== Economy and infrastructure ==
The following is a list of notable employers in Carson City from the fourth quarter of 2012:

1,000–1,499 employees

- Carson City School District

500–999 employees

- Nevada Department of Transportation
- Western Nevada College

200–499 employees

- Nevada Department of Corrections
- Nevada Department of Motor Vehicles
- Casino Fandango
- Walmart
- Precision Castparts Corp.
- Gold Dust West Hotel and Casino
- Carson Nugget
- Costco Wholesale Corporation
- Nevada Department of Conservation and Natural Resources

100–199 employees

- Nevada Department of Health and Human Services, Division of Welfare and Supportive Services

=== Transportation ===
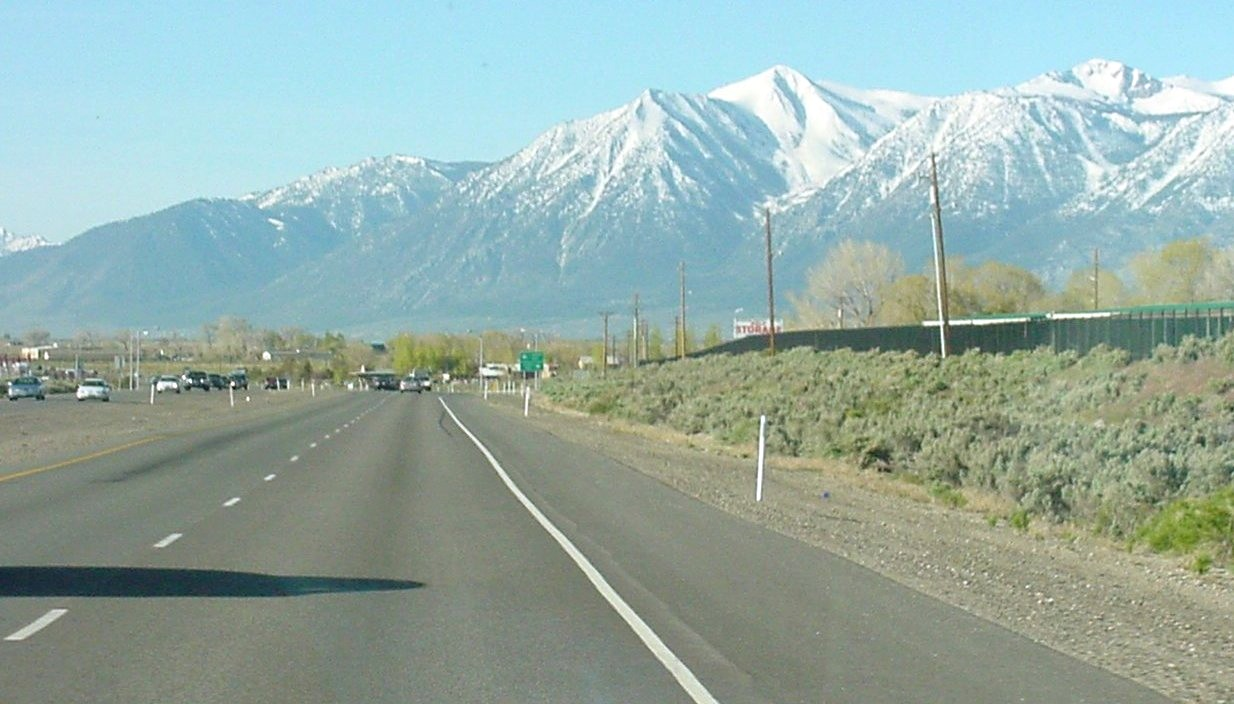
Looking south on US 395, just south of US 50 in Douglas County near Carson City

There are four highways in the city: Nevada State Route 28, U.S. Route 395, U.S. Route 50, and Interstate 580, its only freeway. Phase 1 of the Carson City Freeway Project from US 395, just north of the city, to US 50 was completed in February 2006, and Phase 2A, extending from Rt. 50 to Fairview Drive, was officially opened on September 24, 2009. Phase 2B, Fairview Drive to Rt. 50, was completed in August 2017. Prior to 2012, Carson City was one of the only five state capitals not directly served by an interstate highway until I-580 was extended into the city limits.

Carson City's first modern bus system, Jump Around Carson, or JAC, opened to the public in October 2005. JAC uses a smaller urban bus ideal for Carson City. Tahoe Transportation District connects Gardnerville with Carson City.

However, there is virtually no ground public transportation to other destinations. Passenger trains have not served Carson City since 1950, when the Virginia and Truckee Railroad was shut down. Greyhound Lines stopped their bus services to the town in 2006 and Amtrak discontinued their connecting thruway bus to Sacramento, California, in 2008. There is now only a limited Monday – Friday RTC bus service, to Reno which is still served by both Greyhound and Amtrak, as well as Eastern Sierra Transit Authority service from Lone Pine to Reno.

Carson City is also served by the Carson Airport, which is a regional airport in the northern part of the city. Reno–Tahoe International Airport, which is 28 miles (45 km) away, handles domestic commercial flights.

== Education ==
The Carson City School District, the sole public school district of the city, operates ten schools there. The six elementary schools are Bordewich-Bray Elementary School, Empire Elementary School, Fremont Elementary School, Fritsch Elementary School, Mark Twain Elementary School, and Al Seeliger Elementary School. The two middle schools are Carson Middle School and Eagle Valley Middle School. Carson High School and the alternative Pioneer High School serve high school students. Carson High is on Saliman Road.

The district sponsors Carson Montessori School, a public charter school serving grades K-6. Students residing in any Nevada county may enroll. Carson Montessori School is the only school in district operating with a balanced budget. In 2019 Carson Montessori School received the Governor's STEM Schools Designation, an official recognition given to 25 schools statewide which causes a short ceremony attended by the governor during which receiving schools are assigned a 10-foot (3 m) banner.

Western Nevada College (WNC) is a regionally accredited two-year and four-year institution which is part of the Nevada System of Higher Education. The college offers many programs including education, arts and science.

Carson City has a public library, the Carson City Library.

== Historic buildings ==
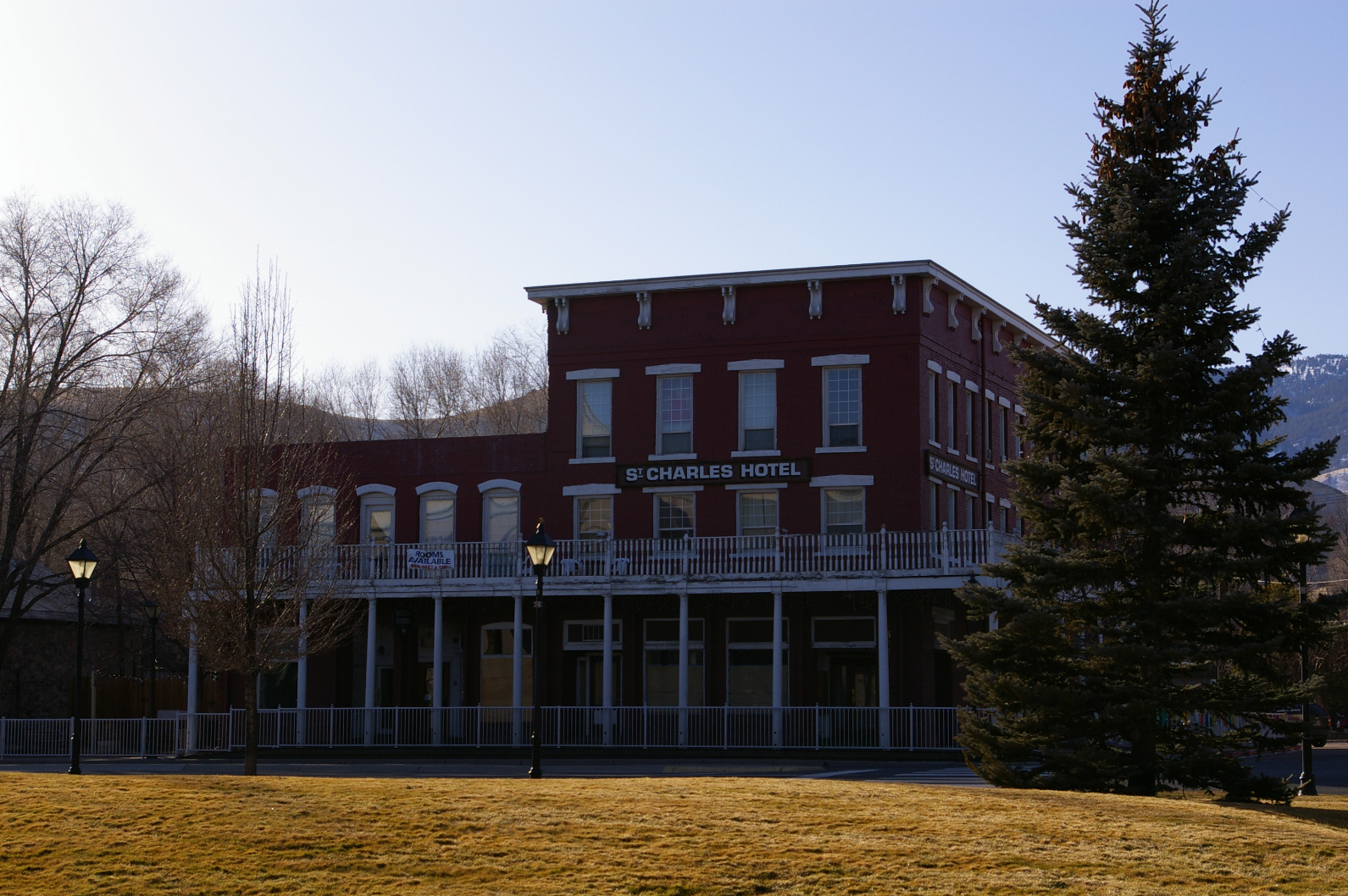
Historic St. Charles Hotel in Carson City

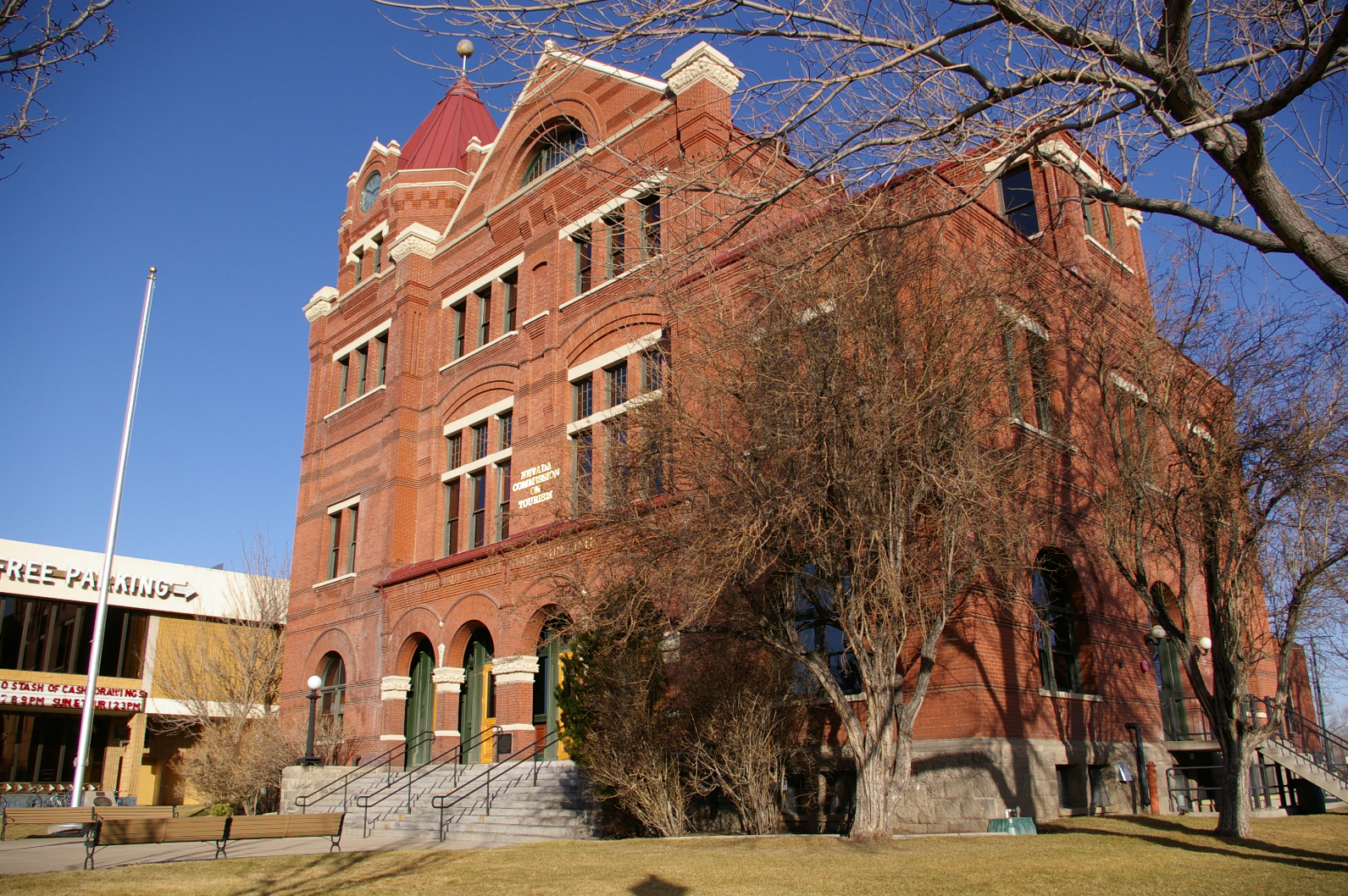
Former Carson City Post Office

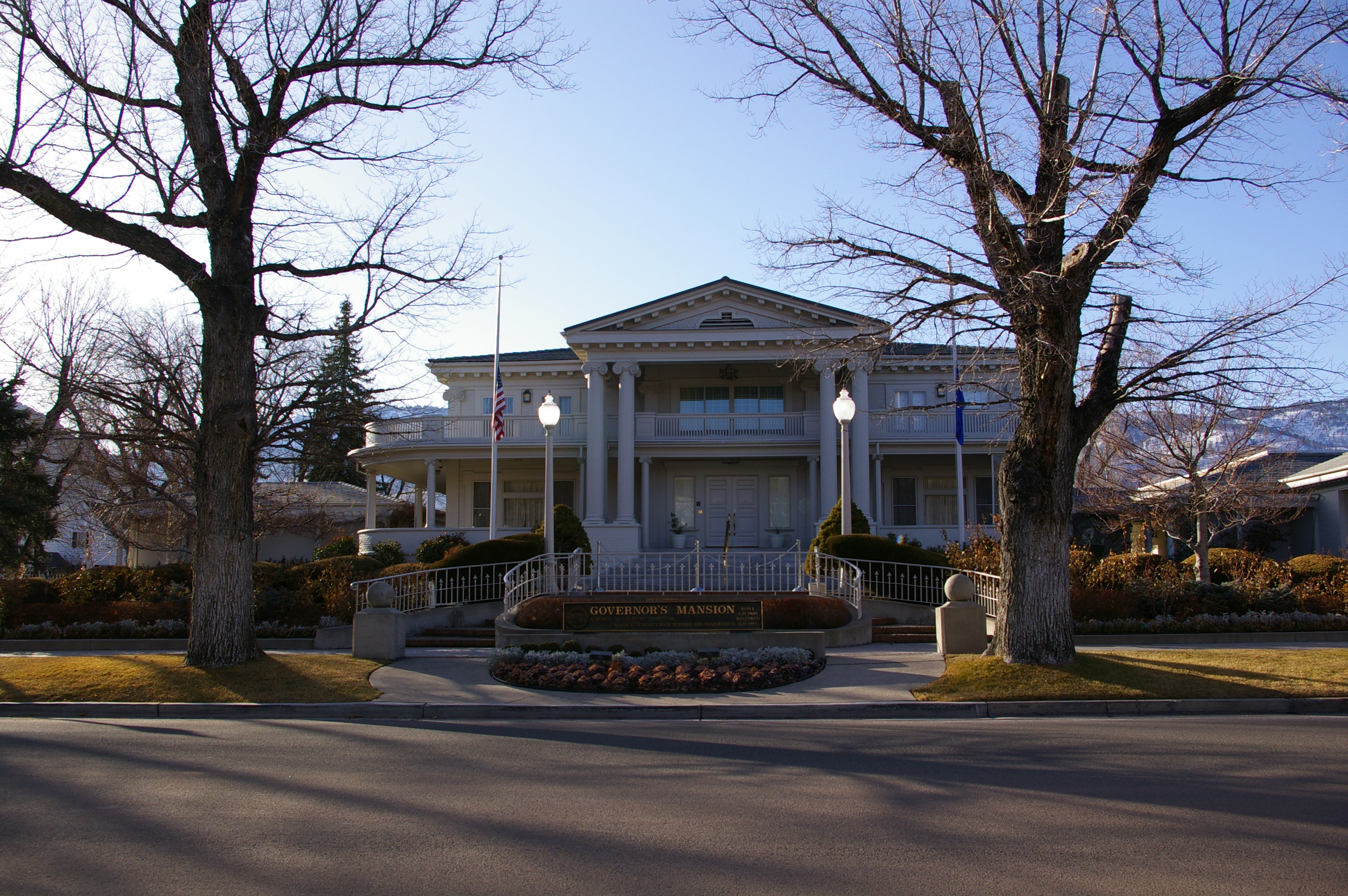
The Governor's Mansion in Carson City

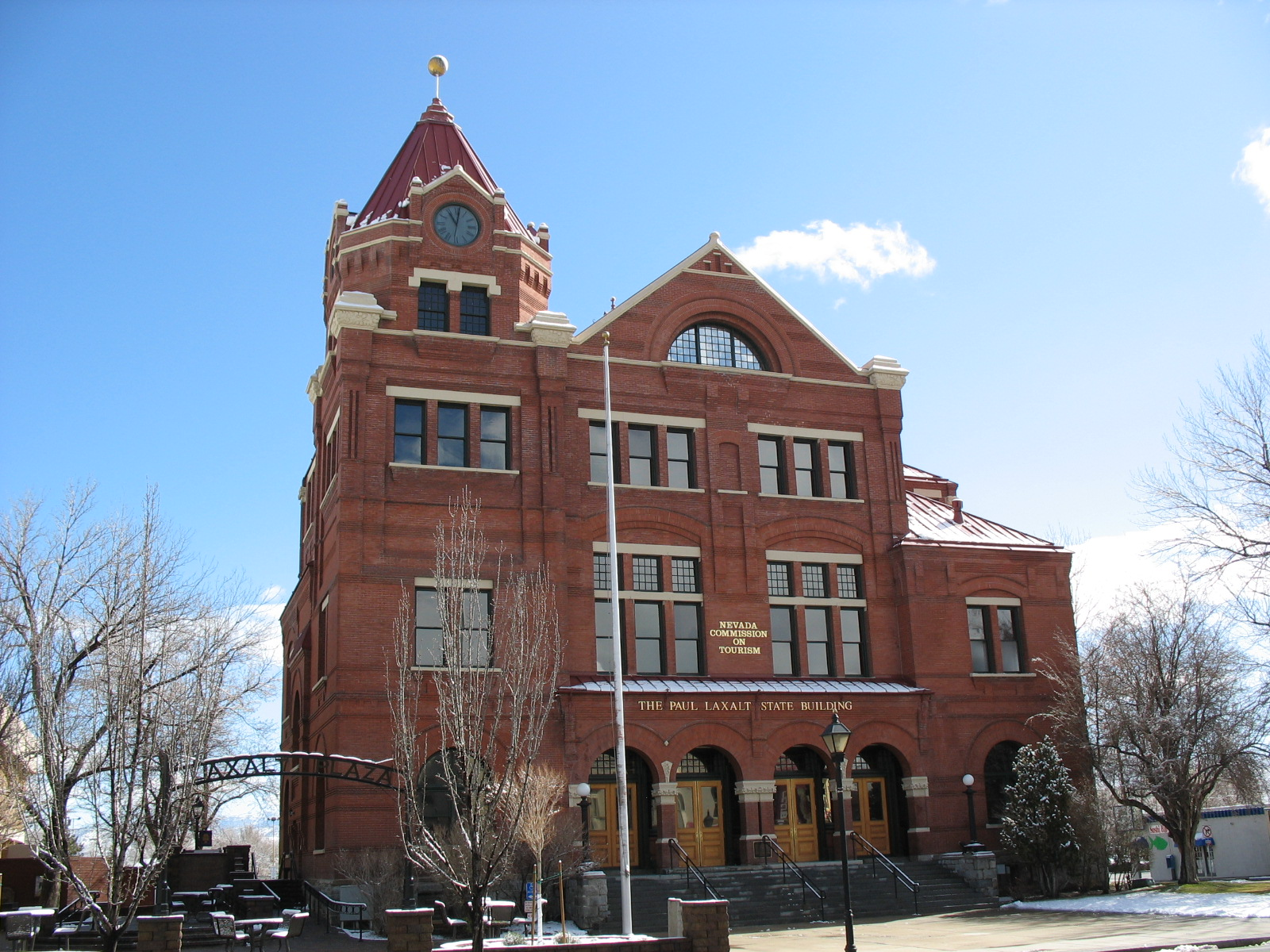
Paul Laxalt State Building – formerly the U.S. Court House & Post Office, now home to the Nevada Commission on Tourism

== See also ==
- Carson Hot Springs
