= Ormsby House =

Former hotel and casino in Carson City, Nevada

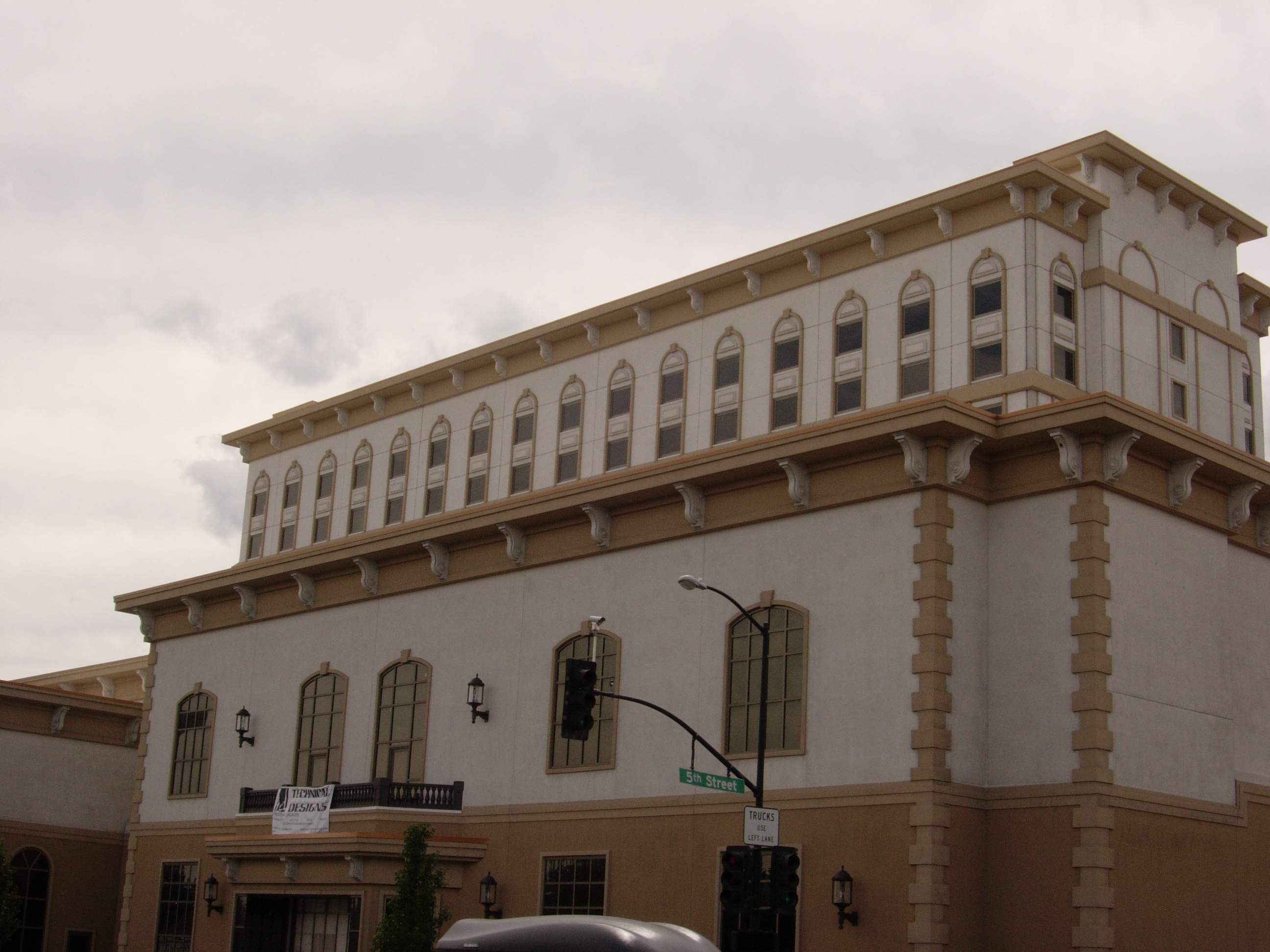
- Interactive map of Ormsby House
- Location: Carson City, Nevada, U.S.; 600 South Carson Street; 39.160772°N 119.767488°W
- Opened: 1972; 54 years ago
- Closed: October 30, 2000; 26 years ago
- Theme: Old West
- No. of rooms: 220
- Gaming space: 10,000 sq ft (930 m^{2})
- Owner: Al Fiegehen; Don Lehr
- Architect: David Jacobson Associates

Ormsby House is a closed hotel and casino in Carson City, Nevada. Originally opened in 1972, it closed on October 30, 2000, for extensive renovations. The re-opening was originally planned for July 4, 2001, but was pushed back many times due to many construction delays, many remodels, and management changes. Through January 2026, the Ormsby House Hotel property is still up for sale, and is expected to possibly be converted into housing. and retail space.

== History ==
The original Ormsby House was built in 1860 by Major William Ormsby, at the corner of 2nd and Carson Streets. Major Ormsby was killed later that same year in the Pyramid Lake War. The hotel lasted until the early 1900s, when it was purchased by Dominique Laxalt and later demolished.

In 1972, a brand new Ormsby House was built by Dominique's son, former Nevada Governor Paul Laxalt, at the corner of 5th and Carson Streets. In 1975, the Laxalts sold it to Woody Loftin, and on his death in 1985, it passed to his son Truett Loftin. Truett Loftin spent a large amount of money on a new large parking structure on Curry Street that connected to the hotel casino with an airwalk. Around this time, casinos in Nevada and elsewhere began to receive increased competition from Indian casinos in California. The Ormsby House hotel casino was forced into bankruptcy protection in 1990, and in 1993 the property was foreclosed and shut down. The Ormsby House stayed closed until 1995, when it was reopened by Barry Silverton. In 1997, The Ormsby House went through bankruptcy and foreclosure again. This time the new owners appointed former lieutenant governor and future Reno mayor Bob Cashell as their general manager. Cashell managed the operation well, and he turned the property around.

In 1999, Ormsby House was sold for $3.75 million to Carson City businessmen Al Fiegehen and Don Lehr, owners of Cubix Computer Corporation. Neither new owner had any hotel management experience. They talked about keeping the hotel casino open during the renovation, but finally decided to lay off all the Ormsby House employees, and perform a complete inside-out renovation, a 'remodel' which continued for two decades.

The Ormsby House was closed for the extensive remodel work on October 30, 2000. The renovation was originally scheduled to be completed on July 4, 2001, but a combination of self-inflicted construction delays, numerous plan changes, permit problems, and ongoing perceived problems with the municipality of Carson City, stretched the project out. At one point, the owners claimed they had become so frustrated dealing with the city due to the imposition of laws applying to an asbestos remodel, that they threatened to demolish the building. There was nothing new then about the dangers of asbestos in any building. As of January 2026, the Ormsby House is still closed.

The renovated Ormsby House was planned to feature the hotel, a large casino, convention meeting space, four bars, a wedding chapel, a coffeehouse, a fine dining restaurant, a buffet, a nightclub, and an entertainment center. From 2003 until 2016, a small slots and video poker casino and bar, the Ormsby Club, operated on Fridays and Saturdays in the hotel's Curry Street parking structure in order to maintain the Nevada state gaming license.

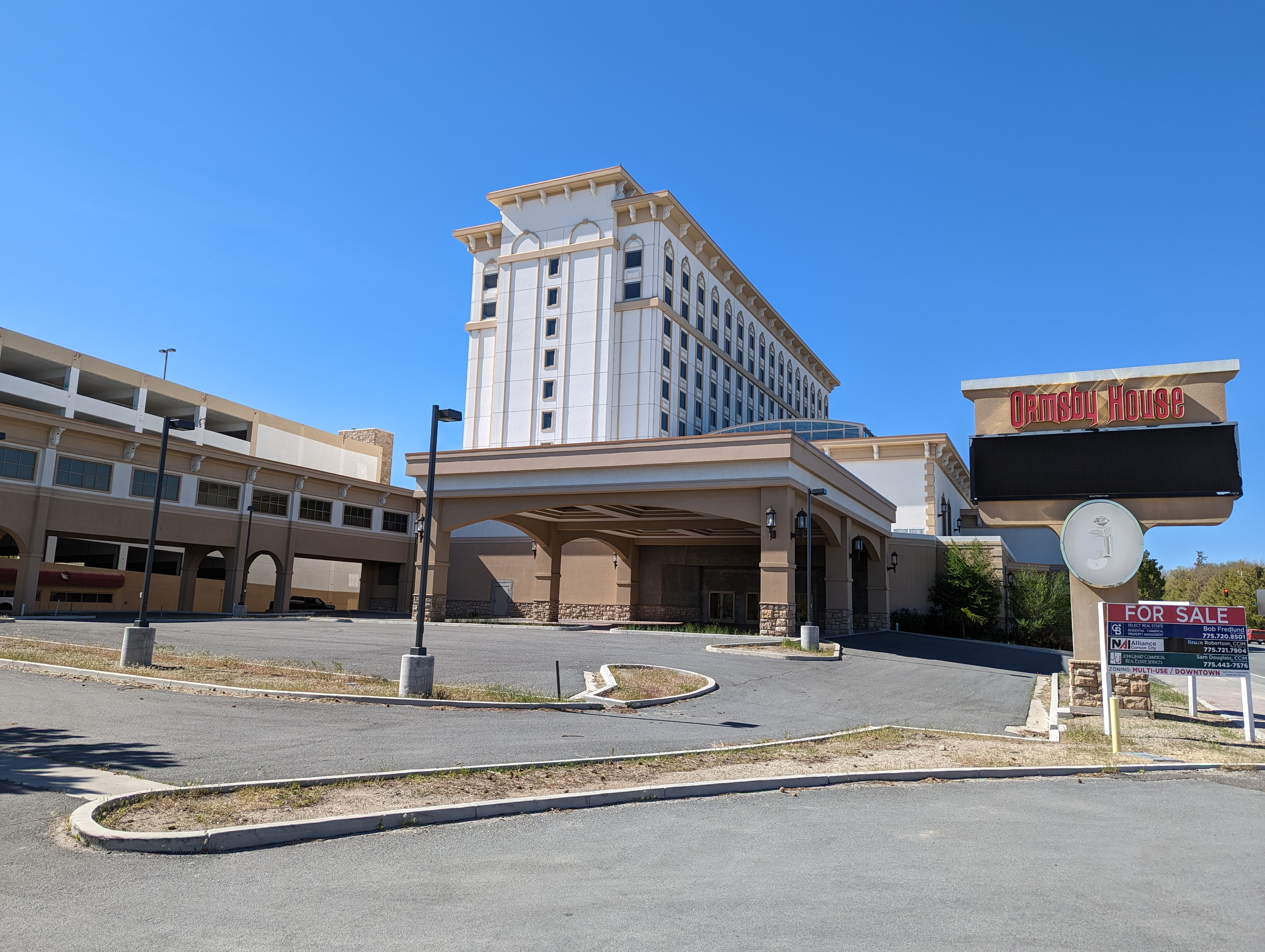
Ormsby House in 2023

In March 2018, owners Fiegehen and Lehr allowed the building permit for the renovations to expire, and stated that the building would likely be converted to a mix of housing and retail rather than a hotel and casino. They reported that there had been ongoing interest from potential buyers, including three deals that had fallen through within the preceding six months.

On March 22, 2022, 92 year-old Don Lehr died.
