= Jump Around Carson =

Nevada public transportation operator

- Parent: Carson City Regional Transportation Commission
- Founded: 2005
- Locale: Carson City
- Service area: Carson City
- Service type: Bus; Paratransit
- Routes: 4
- Annual ridership: 158,297 (2022)
- Website: https://www.carson.org/government/departments-g-z/public-works/transportation/jac-jump-around-carson

Jump Around Carson is a public transit operator in Carson City, Nevada. It offers both dial-a-ride and fixed-route transit service within city limits.

== History ==
Jump Around Carson was incorporated in 2005 to serve the unmet transit needs in Carson City. Originally, the acronym JAC had two meanings at launch. The first one was Jump Around Carson, while the second name was Jump Around the Counties. Due to low ridership, the Carson City Regional Transportation Commission reintroduced the transit service 2006 due to premature service launch, such as not marking bus stops and marketing the transit system.

In 2023, the Carson City Regional Transportation Commission commissioned a study to improve transit reliability by constructing a transit center to replace the downtown transfer center due to overcrowding during peak times.

Also in 2023, Carson City Regional Transportation Commission, approved plans to replace its JAC transit fleet with zero emissions buses in order to reduce greenhouse gas emissions within Carson City.
