= Nevada Day =

Holiday in the state of Nevada in the United States

- Observed by: Nevada, United States
- Date: Last Friday in October
- 2025 date: October 31
- 2026 date: October 30
- 2027 date: October 29
- 2028 date: October 27
- Frequency: annual

Nevada Day is a legal holiday in the state of Nevada in the United States. It commemorates the state's October 31, 1864 admission to the Union. The first known observance of Nevada Day (originally known as Admission Day) was by the Pacific Coast Pioneer society during the 1870s. The Nevada Legislature established it as a state holiday in 1933. It was originally observed on October 31. To give it a three-day weekend, in 2000 Nevada Day was moved to the last Friday in October.

== Observance ==
On this holiday all state, county and city government offices are closed, along with most schools and libraries. Some private businesses, like banks, also closed at their discretion. In Nevada's capital, Carson City, a parade is held through the heart of downtown, as well as a carnival and several other events.

In 2000, the Nevada Legislature decided to celebrate the holiday on a Friday, hoping that a three-day weekend would generate more interest. Nevada Day is now observed on the last Friday in October. But most of the big events in Carson City, including the parade, occur on the following Saturday. This was shortly followed by Las Vegas and Henderson adding up to three Nevada Days throughout the year in addition to the actual holiday which are determined by city council vote during the first week of each legislative year.

Until 2000, Halloween was observed in Carson City, Douglas County, Lyon County, Storey County, and Washoe County on October 30, so as to not conflict with the holiday.

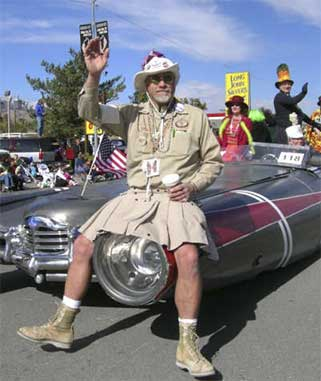
Black Rock Ranger "Teksage" rides an art car during the Nevada Day parade.

Since 2000, Carson City's newspaper, Nevada Appeal, has sponsored a month-long "treasure hunt" each year in October (except for 2003 and 2004) to celebrate Nevada Day. Beginning on the first Monday, a clue is posted each weekday on a web site set up for the contest which helps narrow down the search area. The clues all have to do with Nevada history so it encourages people to study the state's history in order to find the "treasure". Upon finding it, the treasure (a small plaque referred to as a "medallion") can be redeemed for up to $1000.

In 2003, 2008, 2014, and 2025 the legal holiday for Nevada Day fell on October 31, the actual day of admission.

In 2017, the state's first major professional sports team, the National Hockey League’s Vegas Golden Knights, observed Nevada Day with a matinee game. They continue this tradition each year.

== In popular culture ==
In 2006, Nevada Day, and the Nevada town of Pahrump, were central to the plot in "Nevada Day", a two-part episode of the Aaron Sorkin television drama Studio 60 on the Sunset Strip. John Goodman received a Primetime Emmy award for his role as Judge Robert Bebe in the episode. Part One was originally slated to air on Nevada Day, October 31, but was delayed a week and aired on November 6. Part Two followed a week later on November 13.

The 2010 Nevada Day celebration was mentioned on the Colbert Report in reference to Colbert's "March to Keep Fear Alive Insanity Bus" held on the same day as the 2010 Nevada Day parade.
