= St. Charles-Muller's Hotel =

- U.S. National Register of Historic Places
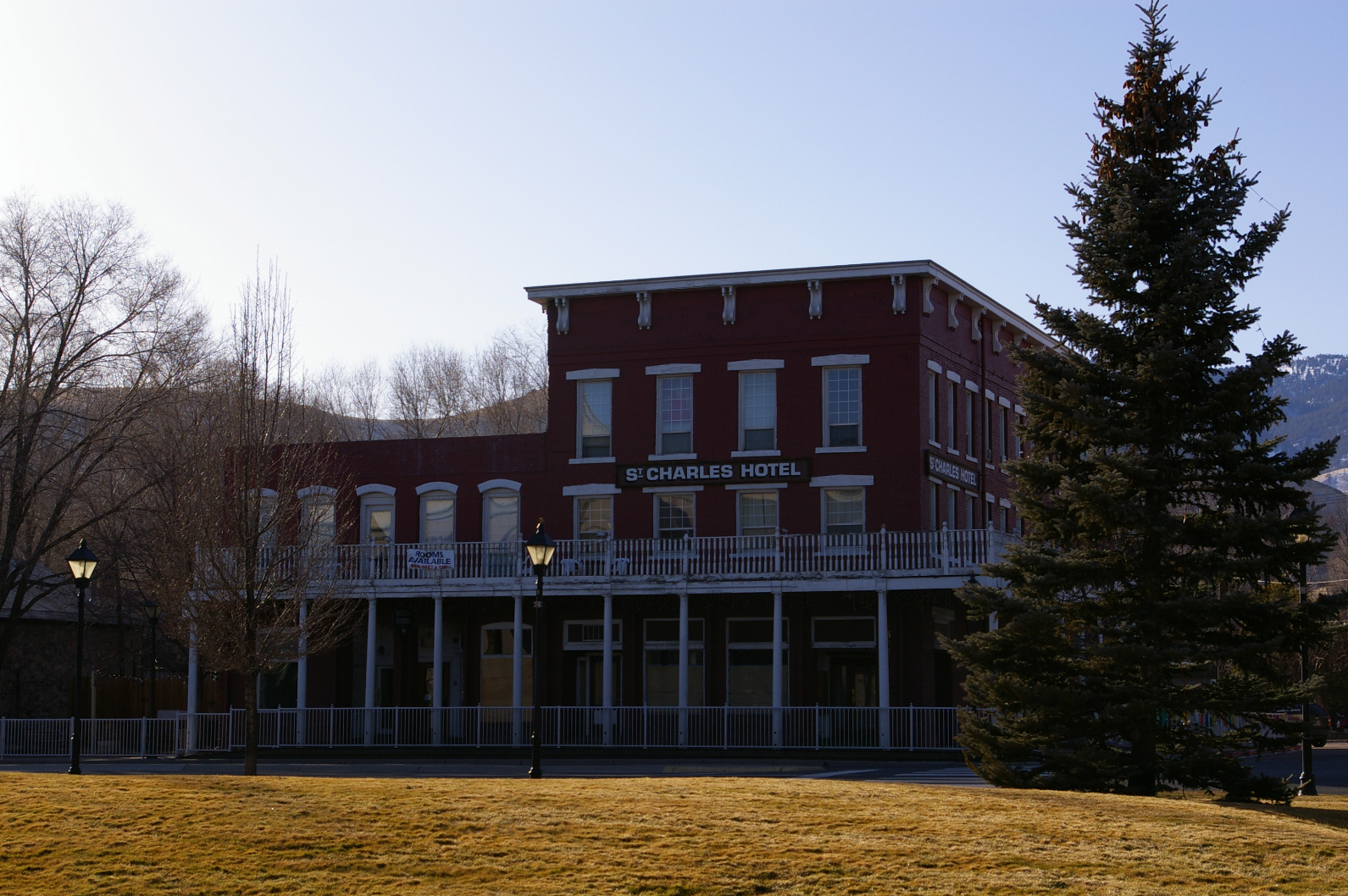

- Location within Nevada Location within the United States
- Location: 302-304-310 S. Carson St., Carson City, Nevada
- Coordinates: 39°9′43″N 119°45′58″W
- Area: 1 acre (0.40 ha)
- Built: 1862
- Built by: Israel, T.T., et al.
- Architectural style: Italianate, Vernacular Italianate
- NRHP reference No.: 82003209
- Added to NRHP: May 27, 1982

The St. Charles-Muller's Hotel, at 302-304-310 S. Carson St. in Carson City, Nevada, is a historic hotel built in 1862. It has also been known as the St. Charles Hotel and as the Pony Express Hotel. It includes vernacular Italianate architecture.

It was listed on the National Register of Historic Places in 1982.

It faces across Carson Street (U.S. 395) towards the Nevada State Capitol and is the oldest surviving brick building on Main Street. It is also the longest continuously operating hotel in the State of Nevada.
