= Whale Beach (Nevada) =

Beach in Nevada, United States

Coordinates: 39.146579°N 119.934264°W

Whale Beach (formerly also known as Black Sand Beach) is a beach on the eastern shore of Lake Tahoe in Nevada, within the city limits of Carson City. It is known for being a nude beach. It derives its current name from the large rocks near the water's edge.

== Location ==
The beach is south of Secret Harbor Creek Beach and is accessible after a 1.2 miles (1.9 km) out-and-back walk from Nevada State Route 28, via Secret Harbor / Whale Beach trail in Toiyabe National Forest.
