= Carson City School District =

School district in Nevada, United States

Coordinates: 39.141°N 119.764°W

Address
- 1402 West King Street Carson City, Nevada, 89702; United States

District information
- Type: Public
- Grades: PreK–12
- NCES District ID: 3200390

Students and staff
- Students: 7,787
- Teachers: 509.0
- Staff: 452.0
- Student–teacher ratio: 15.3

Other information
- Website: www.carsoncityschools.com

Carson City School District (CCSD) is a school district headquartered in Carson City, Nevada. As of 2015 Richard Stokes is the superintendent.

It is the sole school district in Carson City.

== Schools ==
- Carson High School

Middle schools:

- Carson Middle School
- Eagle Valley Middle School

Elementary schools:

- Bordewich-Bray Elementary School
- Empire Elementary School
- Fremont Elementary School
- Fritsch Elementary School
- Mark Twain Elementary School
- Al Seeliger Elementary School
