= David Lundquist =

American baseball player & coach (born 1973)

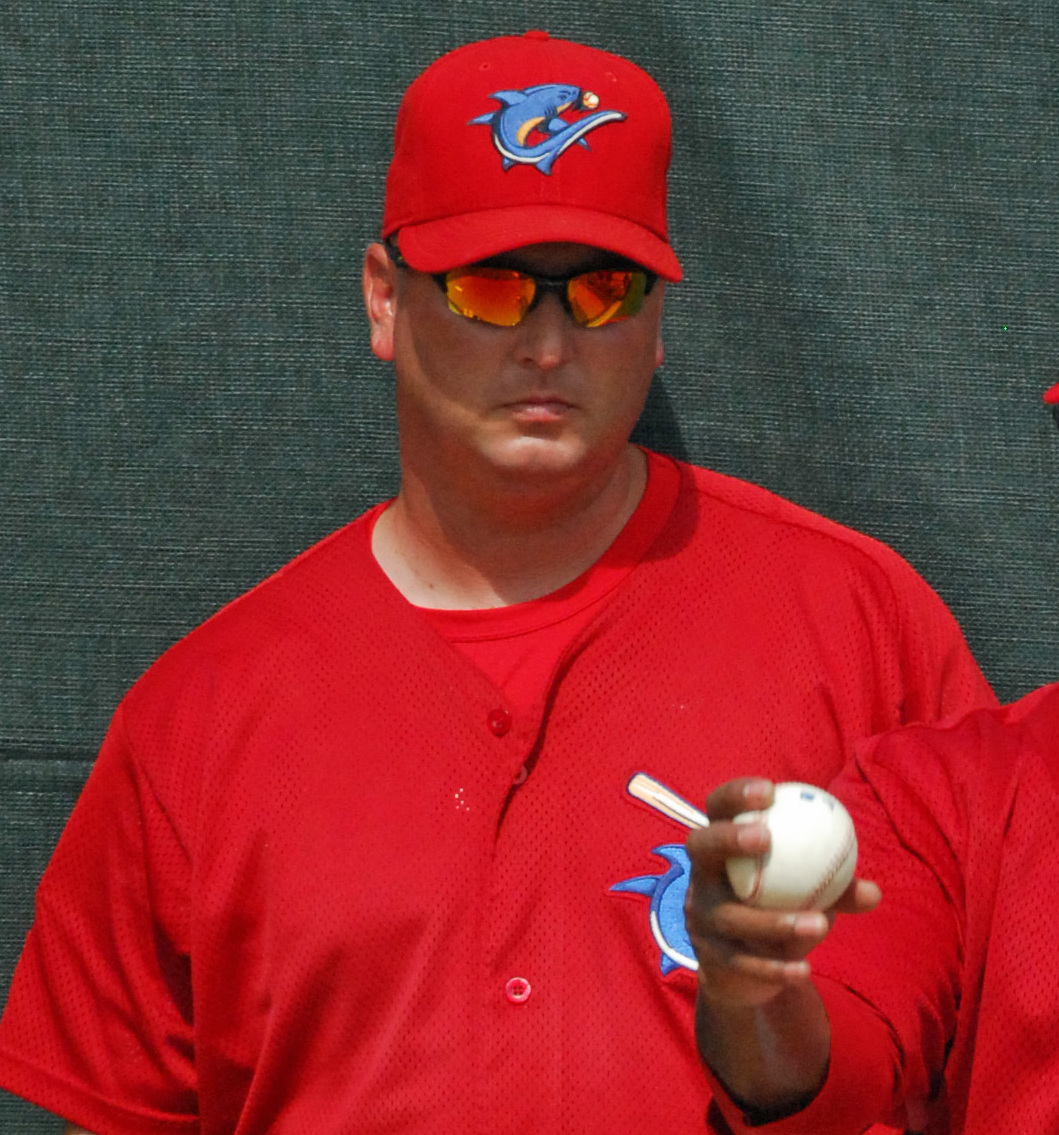
- Lundquist with the Clearwater Threshers in 2009
- Pitcher
- Born: June 4, 1973 (age 52); Beverly, Massachusetts, U.S.
- Batted: Right Threw: Right

Professional debut
- MLB: April 6, 1999, for the Chicago White Sox
- NPB: March 30, 2003, for the Hiroshima Toyo Carp

Last appearance
- MLB: June 28, 2002, for the San Diego Padres
- NPB: August 7, 2003, for the Hiroshima Toyo Carp

MLB statistics
- Win–loss record: 1–2
- Earned run average: 7.92
- Strikeouts: 37

NPB statistics
- Win–loss record: 0–0
- Earned run average: 8.22
- Strikeouts: 3
- Stats at Baseball Reference

Teams
- As player: Chicago White Sox (1999); San Diego Padres (2001–2002); Hiroshima Toyo Carp (2003); As coach: Philadelphia Phillies (2019–2023)

David Bruce Lundquist Jr. (born June 4, 1973) is an American baseball coach and former professional baseball pitcher. He made his Major League Baseball (MLB) for the Chicago White Sox in 1999 and pitched briefly for the San Diego Padres in 2002 and 2003. As a coach, he was a bullpen coach for the Philadelphia Phillies and is currently the assistant pitching coach for the Triple-A Omaha Storm Chasers.

== Amateur career ==
Lundquist graduated from Carson High School in Carson City, Nevada. He then attended the University of Nevada, Las Vegas and Cochise Junior College.

== Playing career ==
=== Chicago White Sox ===
The Chicago White Sox drafted Lundquist in the fifth round of the 1993 MLB draft. He began his professional career with the Rookie-Level Gulf Coast League White Sox in 1993. He went 5–3 with a 3.14 ERA in 11 games, 10 of them starts.

In 1994 Lundquist played for the Class-A Hickory Crawdads of the South Atlantic League. He went 13–10 with a 3.48 ERA and 133 strikeouts in 27 games, all starts. He also pitched two shutouts.

Lundquist spent the 1995 season with the Class-A South Bend Silver Hawks of the Midwest League. In 18 starts, Lundquist went 8–4 with a 3.58 ERA and 60 strikeouts in 118 innings pitched. Lundquist pitched five complete games and one shutout.

The next season, 1996, saw Lundquist a promotion to the Class-A Advanced Prince William Cannons but an injury had him demoted to the Rookie-Level Gulf Coast League White Sox. He went a combined 1–3 with a 4.65 ERA in eight games, all starts.

In 1997 Lundquist played for the Class-A Advanced Winston-Salem Warthogs of the Carolina League and the Double-A Birmingham Barons of the Southern League. Lundquist went a combined 3–1 with a 7.19 ERA and 54 strikeouts in 27 games, six starts. For the first time in his professional career, Lundquist pitched mainly in relief.

Lundquist played the 1998 season at three different levels of the White Sox organization, playing for the Class-A Advanced Winston-Salem Warthogs, the Double-A Birmingham Barons and the Triple-A Calgary Cannons. He went a combined 5–1 with a 3.24 ERA in 51 games, all in relief. Lundquist finished the season with 12 saves, his first career season with any saves.

Lundquist debuted in the majors in 1999. He started the season with the Triple-A Charlotte Knights of the International League where in three games, he gave up no runs. He made his first Major League appearance on April 6, 1999 against the Seattle Mariners giving up no runs in one inning. Lundquist pitched in 17 games with the White Sox by mid-June, with an 8.59 ERA in 22 innings, before the team waived him.

=== Aberdeen Arsenal ===
The Kansas City Royals claimed Lundquist off waivers on October 15, 1999. He was released by the Royals on March 29, 2000 before making an appearance.

In 2000, Lundquist played for the Aberdeen Arsenal of the independent Atlantic League. He went 4–3 with a 9.07 ERA in 21 games, all in relief.

=== San Diego Padres ===
Lundquist was signed by the San Diego Padres on February 8, 2001. He spent the '01 season with the Triple-A Portland Beavers of the Pacific Coast League. He went 4–7 with a 3.11 ERA in 50 games. Lundquist lead all Beavers relief pitchers in ERA and games pitched. He also pitched 17 games at the Major League level and went 0–1 with a 5.95 ERA and 19 strikeouts in 19 2/3 innings. He was granted free agency on October 15, 2001, but re-signed on October 22.

Lundquist started the 2002 season with the Triple-A Portland Beavers where he went 1–4 with a 5.62 ERA in 30 games. His 21 saves lead all Beavers pitchers. Lundquist spent three games in the majors with the Padres, giving up five earned runs in 2 2/3 innings. The Padres released him on July 15, 2002.

=== Hiroshima Carp ===
Lundquist joined the Hiroshima Carp of Nippon Professional Baseball before the 2003 season. He pitched in only 6 games in Japan, allowing 7 runs in 7 2/3 innings.

=== Pittsburgh Pirates ===
Lundquist signed with the Pittsburgh Pirates on February 9, 2004 and spent the 2004 season with the Class-A Hickory Crawdads and the Double-A Altoona Curve. He went a combined 7–2 with a 3.40 ERA in 25 games. Lundquist did not make the major leagues and retired after the 2004 season.

== Coaching career ==
Lundquist was a pitching coach in the Pirates' minor league system from 2005 to 2007 for the Williamsport Crosscutters and Hickory Crawdads. He then joined the Philadelphia Phillies organization in 2008, coaching for the Lakewood Blueclaws, Clearwater Threshers, and Reading Fightin Phils. He was the pitching coach for the Lehigh Valley IronPigs in 2018.

In 2019, Lundquist became the assistant pitching coach of the Philadelphia Phillies in MLB. He became the team's bullpen coach in 2021, helping the team reach the 2022 World Series. The Phillies did not retain Lundquist after the 2023 season.

In 2024, Lundquist was named the assistant pitching coach for the Omaha Storm Chasers, the Triple-A affiliate of the Kansas City Royals. He returned to Omaha in 2025.
