= Carson High School (Carson City, Nevada) =

Public school in Carson City, Nevada, US

Coordinates: 39.169032°N 119.748874°W

Location
- 1111 North Saliman; Carson City, Nevada 89701; USA

Information
- Type: Public
- School district: Carson City School District
- Principal: Daniel Carstons
- Staff: 103.50 (FTE)
- Grades: 9-12
- Enrollment: 2,275 (2023–2024)
- Student to teacher ratio: 21.98
- Campus: Rural
- Colors: Royal Blue, White, Silver
- Mascot: Senator
- Rival: Douglas High School
- Website: chs.carsoncityschools.com

Carson High School is a high school (grades 9–12) in Carson City, Nevada, United States. It is a part of the Carson City School District.

== Notable alumni ==
- Mark Amodei – current member U.S. House of Representatives
- Bob Ayrault – former MLB pitcher
- Mackena Bell – NASCAR driver
- Dusty Bergman – former MLB pitcher
- Chris Cox (DJ) – Grammy nominated music producer, remixer, and DJ
- John Gamble – Former MLB player (Detroit Tigers)
- Dean Heller – former U.S. senator from Nevada
- Charlie Kerfeld – former MLB pitcher
- Paul Laxalt (1922-2018) – Nevada governor and U.S. senator
- Cdr. Kirk Lippold – commander of the USS Cole during terrorist attack
- David Lundquist – former MLB player (Chicago White Sox, San Diego Padres)
- Donovan Osborne – former MLB pitcher
- Darrell Rasner – former baseball pitcher, currently a scout for the Tohoku Rakuten Golden Eagles
- Matt Williams – former MLB third baseman and coach; former manager of the Washington Nationals baseball team.
