= Chimney Beach =

Beach in Nevada, United States

- Beach
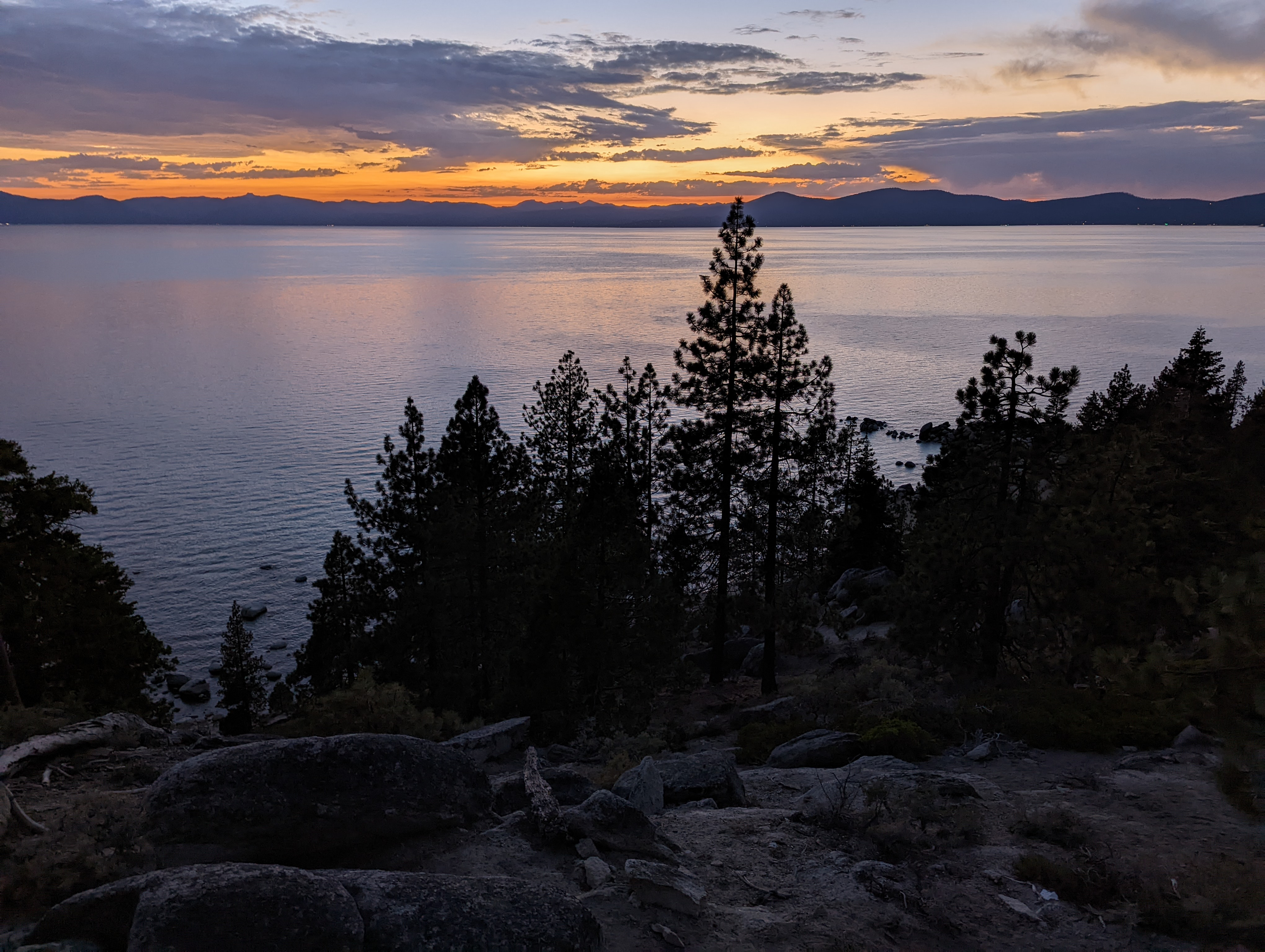
- Chimney Beach, Lake Tahoe

- Location in Nevada
- Coordinates: 39.1649080°N 119.9337969°W

Chimney Beach is a beach on the Nevada side of Lake Tahoe. It is named after the chimney that is on the shoreline. The chimney once served an old cabin, but now stands alone.

The parking area for the beach is on the south edge of Lake Tahoe – Nevada State Park on Nevada State Route 28 and is the trailhead for the Chimney Beach Trail. It is 0.5 miles (0.80 km) long to hike from the Secret Harbor Parking Lot down to Chimney Beach on the east shore of Lake Tahoe. Chimney Beach is located near the end of Marlette Creek. The trail connects to a series of mountain trails just south of Marlette Lake.
