= Steven S. Coughlin =

American epidemiologist and author

- Born: July 14, 1957 (age 69)
- Education: University of Nevada at Reno, San Diego State University, Johns Hopkins University
- Occupations: Epidemiologist, author
- Known for: Congressional testimony in support of U.S. veterans
- Parents: Eugene Arthur Coughlin (father); Oddetta Ann Coughlin (mother)
- Awards: Research Integrity Award from the International Society for Environmental Epidemiology

Steven Coughlin (born July 14, 1957) is an American epidemiologist and author who received international attention for his Congressional testimony in support of U.S. veterans. At the time of this entry, he is a tenured Professor of Epidemiology at Augusta University in Augusta, GA. Coughlin has published over 366 scientific articles and was the lead author of the first and second editions of Case Studies in Public Health Ethics, and lead editor of the first, second, and third editions of Ethics and Epidemiology. In addition, Coughlin was the author of The Principle of Equal Abundance, The Nature of Principles, and the first and second editions of Ethics in Epidemiology and Public Health Practice: Collected Works. Most recently, Coughlin was co-editor of Handbook of Community-based Participatory Research, Black Health in the South, and Professional Ethics in Epidemiology.

== Early life and education ==
Coughlin was born on July 14, 1957, to Oddetta Ann Coughlin and the late Eugene Arthur Coughlin. He was raised in California and Nevada and attended college at the University of Nevada at Reno. In 1984, he received his masters of public health degree from San Diego State University. Coughlin received his doctorate in epidemiology from the Johns Hopkins University in 1988. His dissertation advisor was Dr. Moyses Szklo.

== Career ==
Early in his career, Coughlin conducted several epidemiologic studies of idiopathic dilated cardiomyopathy (IDCM), including the first two case-control studies of IDCM, the first cohort mortality study of IDCM, and the second incidence study of IDCM in a US population. In the case-control research, associations were found between IDCM and bronchial asthma and asthma medications. Coughlin was principal investigator of the NIH-funded Washington, DC Dilated Cardiomyopathy Study, which found that African Americans are 2 to 3 times more likely to develop IDCM, and that those who do develop it are up to 5 times more likely to die from it than their white counterparts.

As a faculty member at Georgetown University School of Medicine in Washington, DC (1989–1993), Coughlin participated in the planning and conduct of community-based research involving residents of the District of Columbia and oncology clinical and preventive trials. While a faculty member at the Tulane University School of Public Health and Tropical Medicine in New Orleans (1993–1997), he planned and conducted community-based research on the early detection of breast and cervical cancer in diverse communities in southern Louisiana.

Coughlin served as chair of the American College of Epidemiology (ACE) Ethics and Standards of Practice Committee and the International Society for Environmental Epidemiology (ISEE) Standing Committee on Ethics and philosophy, working closely with other epidemiologists with shared interests in professional ethics in epidemiology. He conducted collaborative surveys of ethics instruction among US schools of public health and public health professionals. Coughlin chaired the writing group that drafted the first set of ethics guidelines for American College of Epidemiology members.

During the eleven years that he was a senior epidemiologist in the Division of Cancer Prevention and Control at the Centers for Disease Control and Prevention in Atlanta (1997–2008), Coughlin participated in numerous collaborative studies on cancer of the breast, cervix, colon, and ovary. While a senior epidemiologist at the Department of Veterans Affairs (VA) Office of Public Health in Washington, DC (2008–2012), Coughlin was principal investigator of the Follow-up Study of a National Cohort of Gulf War and Gulf War Veterans and coinvestigator of the National Health Study for a New Generation of US Veterans.

In 2012, he resigned his position at the VA in protest of ethical problems, alleging that the Veterans' Administration (VA) had covered up evidence showing adverse health consequences for veterans who were exposed to toxic materials from various environmental hazards in Iraq, Afghanistan, and the first Gulf War. Coughlin testified as a whistleblower in the U.S. Congress in support of veterans. In his congressional testimony and meetings with the VA Office of Research Oversight and American Legion Policy Committee, Coughin was among the first to call for enhanced patient safety procedures for research participants in large-scale epidemiologic and clinical research studies who self-report suicide ideation.

After he retired from the U.S. Civil Service in 2013, Coughlin's work has focused on service, teaching, and collaborative research addressing health disparities by race, Hispanic ethnicity, nativity, and sexual orientation; community-based participatory research; veterans' health; women's health; and the use of smartphone applications to promote healthy behaviors in diverse populations. In 2014, he was a professor in the Department of Preventive Medicine at the University of Tennessee College of Medicine, in Memphis, Tennessee. where he focused on community-engaged research and patient-centered comparative effectiveness research on health disparities. More recently, Coughlin was principal investigator of the Gulf War Women's Cohort Study funded by the Department of Defense, carried out by experts at the VA Boston Healthcare System, Boston University School of Public Health, the US Air Force, Baylor College of Medicine, Uniformed Services University of the Health Sciences, and Nova University.

== Awards ==
In 2014, Coughlin received the Research Integrity Award from the International Society for Environmental Epidemiology. Also in 2014, Coughlin received the Deployment Health Researcher of the Year Award from the Sergeant Sullivan Center in Washington, D.C.

== Publications ==
- Coughlin, Steven S. Post-traumatic Stress Disorder and Chronic Health Conditions. Washington, DC: American Public Health Association Press, 2013. ISBN 9780875532622
- Coughlin, Steven S. Case Studies in Public Health Ethics. Washington, D.C: American Public Health Association, 2009. ISBN 9780875532547
- Coughlin, Steven Scott, and Tom L. Beauchamp, eds. Ethics and epidemiology. Oxford University Press, US, 1996. ISBN 9780195102420
- Watson, Meg, Steven S. Coughlin, et al. "Burden of cervical cancer in the United States, 1998–2003." Cancer 113.S10 (2008): 2855–2864.
- Coughlin, Steven S., et al. "Predictors of pancreatic cancer mortality among a large cohort of United States adults." Cancer Causes & Control 11.10 (2000): 915–923.
- Coughlin SS, Calle EE, Teras LR, Petrelli J, Thun MJ. "Diabetes mellitus as a predictor of cancer mortality in a large cohort of US adults." Am J Epidemiol. 2004 Jun 15;159(12):1160-7.
- Coughlin SS, Yoo W, Whitehead MS, Smith SA. "Advancing breast cancer survivorship among African-American women." Breast Cancer Res Treat. 2015 Sep;153(2):253-61.
- Coughlin SS, Matthews-Juarez P, Juarez PD, Melton CE, King M. "Opportunities to address lung cancer disparities among African Americans." Cancer Med. 2014 Dec;3(6):1467–76.
- Coughlin SS, Barker A, Dawson A. "Ethics and scientific integrity in public health, epidemiological and clinical research." Public Health Rev. 2012 Jan 1;34(1):71–83.
- Coughlin SS. "Model curricula in public health ethics." Am J Prev Med. 1996 Jul–Aug;12(4):247-51.
- Coughlin SS. "How many principles for public health ethics?" Coughlin SS. Open Public Health J. 2008 Jan 1;1:8–16.

== See also ==
- gulf war syndrome
- United States Department of Veterans Affairs
