= Eagle Valley (Nevada) =

Valley in Nevada, United States

Coordinates: 39.1652°N 119.7566°W

Eagle Valley, Nevada
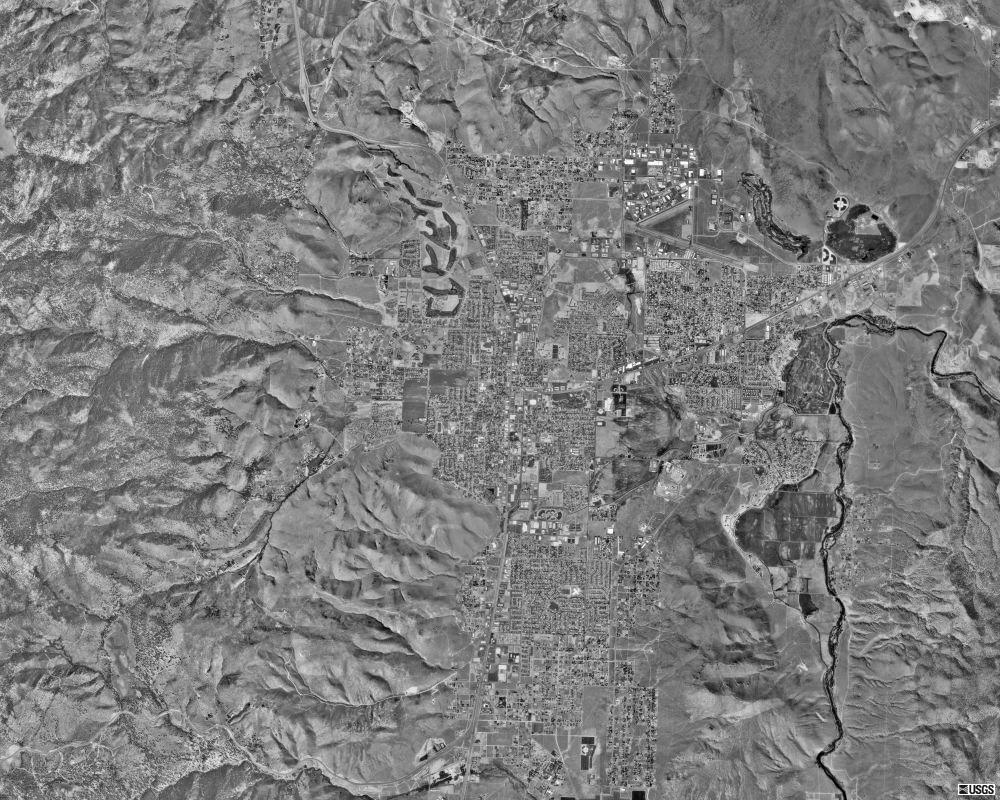
Aerial photo of Eagle Valley, and its location in Nevada.

Eagle Valley is the area encompassing Carson City, Nevada. The valley was first settled during the California Gold Rush of 1849. The discovery of Nevada's Comstock Lode in 1859 established the economic importance of the area, which would become the site of the Nevada State Capitol.

== History ==
The area was historically occupied by the indigenous Washoe before the arrival of American settlers. The Bartleson–Bidwell Party is believed to have passed through the area on the way to California in 1841. Kit Carson and John C. Fremont rode into the valley, which was still under Mexican rule, during their survey of the Western United States in the mid-1840s. In 1848, Mexico ceded the region to the United States after the Mexican–American War. Soon afterwards, the California Gold Rush brought a wave of prospectors in search of fortune.

In September 1850, the valley was part of the newly established Utah Territory. Many early settlers included Mormons led by Colonel John Reese. In 1851, Reese and a band of eighteen men established "Mormon Station", the first trading post of the Nevada region, near the valley at a location that would become the town of Genoa. When they were recalled to Salt Lake City, Utah by Mormon leader Brigham Young, the land was sold to local resident John Mankin. North of Genoa, in the area of what would become Carson City, another early trading post was established, known as Eagle Station. The post was likely located near present-day Fifth and Thompson streets in Carson City. The surrounding area was called Eagle Ranch. The name reportedly came from an eagle shot by ranch manager Frank Hall, who displayed it on the trading post wall. The station served as a stop on the California Trail.

=== Establishment of Carson City ===
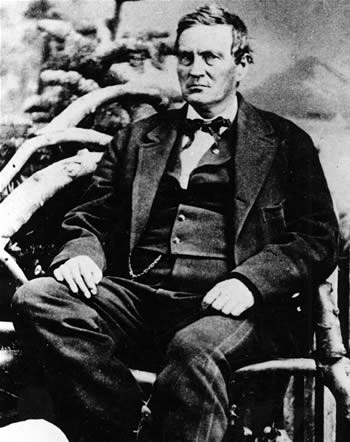
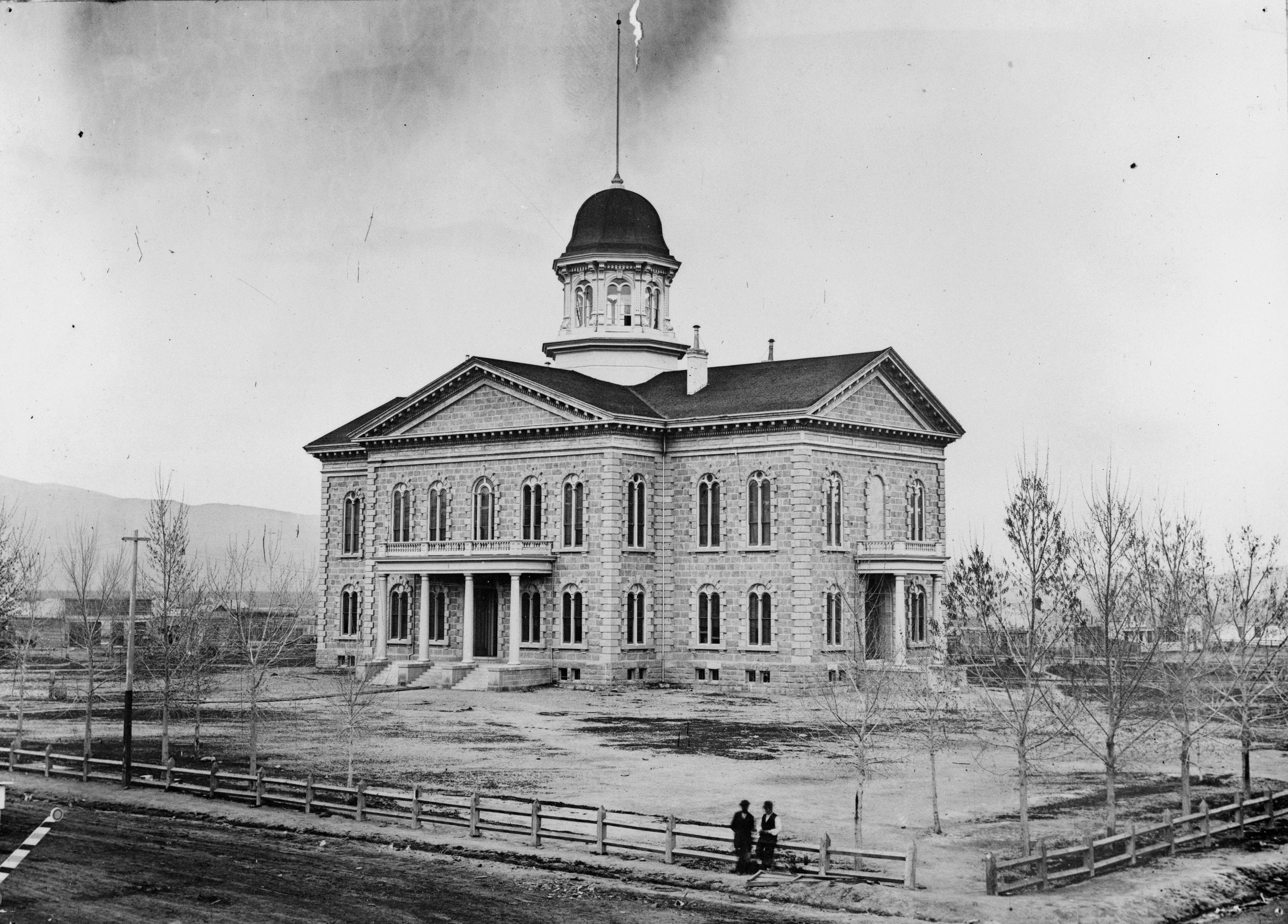
Abraham Curry set aside 10 acres (4.0 ha) in the center of the valley for the site of the Nevada State Capitol.

In 1858, Abraham Curry came to Eagle Valley after he found the real estate in Genoa to be too expensive. Curry partnered with attorneys John J. Musser and Frank M. Proctor to purchase the trading post and much of the valley for a $300 down payment out of a total sale price of $1,000. Musser and Proctor worked to carve a separate territory from Utah, while Curry promoted the newly founded Carson City. Curry set aside and donated 10 acres (4.0 ha) of land for the site of the future Nevada State Capitol.

=== Silver mines and statehood ===
In July 1859, Musser became president and Proctor became vice-president of the constitutional convention to establish the Territory of Nevada. Curry served as the delegate from Eagle Valley. In 1859, the discovery of the Comstock Lode east of Carson City was made public. It was the largest silver find in history, attracting tens of thousands of miners to the area.

Carson City became a station of the Pony Express in 1860, and was designated the territorial capital in 1861. In 1862, the Nevada Territorial Legislature leased the Warm Springs Hotel, located in the valley east of Carson City, from Curry to hold meetings and detain prisoners. The legislature had been using the site's prison quarry to provide stone material for the Nevada State Capitol. In 1864, the territorial legislature acquired the hotel along with 20 acres (8.1 ha) of land from Curry for $80,000. As the American Civil War was being fought in the Eastern United States, Nevada became a state on October 31, 1864.

In 1873, another major silver find called Big Bonanza continued the prosperity of the area. In that same year, railway service was opened by the Virginia and Truckee Railroad to transport ore and timber.

== Geography ==
Eagle Valley is a tributary to the Carson River basin. Runoff from the valley has contributed to flooding of Carson City, notably on January 3, 1997.

== See also ==
- History of Nevada
- Silver mining in Nevada
