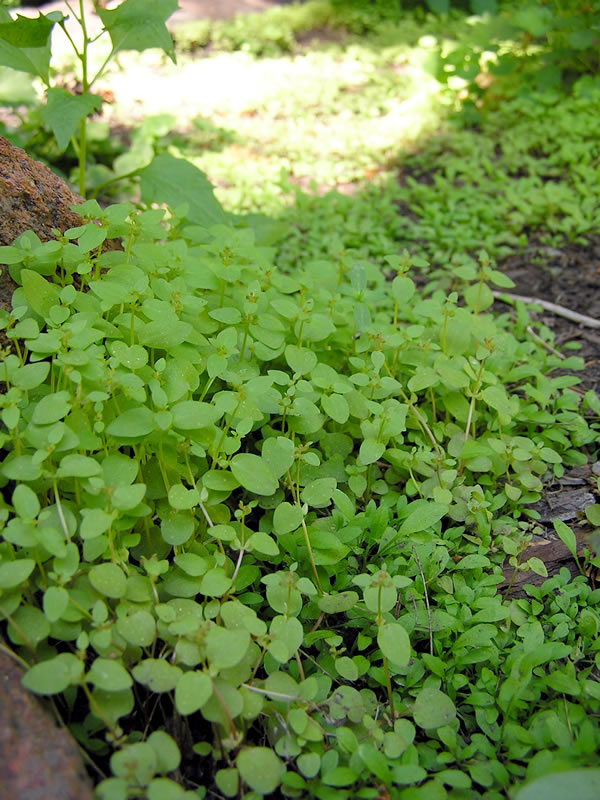

Conservation status
- Critically Imperiled (NatureServe)

Scientific classification
- Kingdom: Plantae
- Clade: Embryophytes
- Clade: Tracheophytes
- Clade: Angiosperms
- Clade: Eudicots
- Clade: Asterids
- Order: Lamiales
- Family: Phrymaceae
- Genus: Erythranthe
- Species: E. gemmipara

Binomial name
- Erythranthe gemmipara (W.A.Weber) G.L.Nesom & N.S.Fraga

Synonyms
- Mimulus gemmiparus W.A.Weber

= Erythranthe gemmipara =

Plant species in the lopseed family

Erythranthe gemmipara is a rare species of flowering plant in the family Phrymaceae, known by the common name Rocky Mountain monkeyflower. It is endemic to Colorado in the United States, where there are eight known occurrences. It was formerly known as Mimulus gemmiparus.

This annual herb grows about 10 centimeters (3.9 inches) tall. Some of the leaves have propagules on their petioles called gemmae. When a leaf falls off the plant the gemma can generate a new plant; this is the mode of reproduction for this species, as flowers are rarely produced and they are sterile. The gemmae are probably dispersed on water. The plants occur in colonies of mother and daughter plants. When they do occur, the flowers are yellow with variable patterns of red spots and measure about half a centimeter long. While the flowers are rare in nature, the plants may produce many flowers when propagated in the greenhouse.

This plant grows in subalpine climates in moist areas such as seeps in granite outcrops and overhangs and forest habitat near springs. It can often be found alongside other Erythranthe species, such as Erythranthe floribunda, Erythranthe guttata, and Erythranthe rubella. The forests are dominated by spruce, fir, and aspen and other plants in the habitat may include Jamesia americana (fivepetal cliffbush), Dodecatheon spp. (shootingstar), Aquilegia saximontana (Rocky Mountain blue columbine), Epilobium spp. (fireweed), Salix spp. (willow), Campanula rotundifolia (bluebell bellflower), Artemisia ludoviciana (white sagebrush), Packera plattensis (prairie groundsel), Erigeron subtrinervis (threenerve fleabane), Rhodiola integrifolia (ledge stonecrop), Oreochrysum parryi (Parry's goldenrod), Brickellia microphylla (littleleaf brickellbush), Amelanchier utahensis (Utah serviceberry), and Montia chamissoi (water minerslettuce). Threats to this species include recreational activities such as hiking and horseback riding.

== Taxonomy ==
Erythranthe gemmipara was scientifically described in 1972 by William Alfred Weber with the name Mimulus gemmiparus. In 2012 it was moved to the genus Erythranthe by Guy L. Nesom and Naomi Fraga, giving the species its accepted name. Together with its genus it is classified in the family Phrymaceae.
