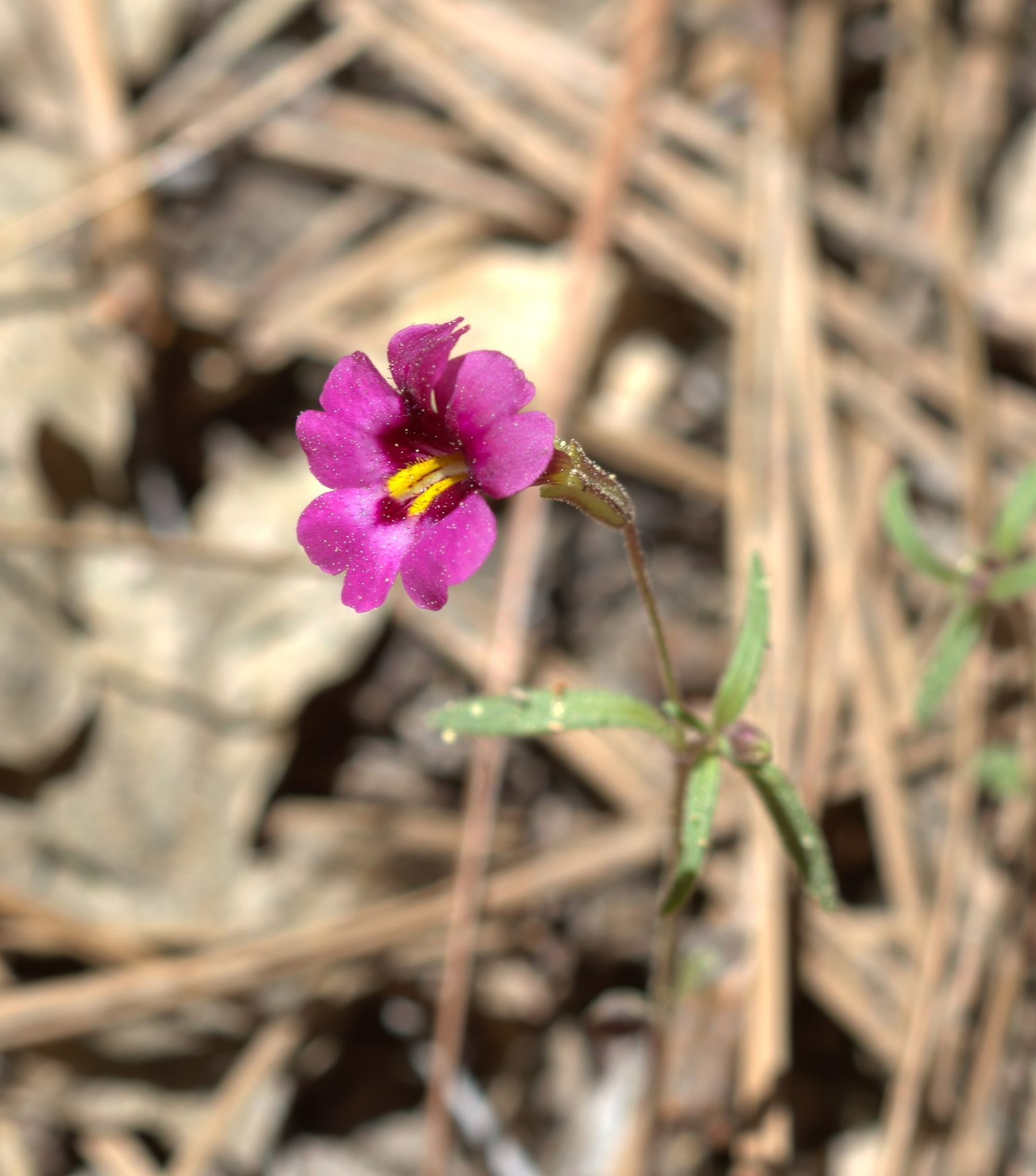
- San Bernardino County, California, 2023

Conservation status
- Unranked (NatureServe)

Scientific classification
- Kingdom: Plantae
- Clade: Embryophytes
- Clade: Tracheophytes
- Clade: Angiosperms
- Clade: Eudicots
- Clade: Asterids
- Order: Lamiales
- Family: Phrymaceae
- Genus: Erythranthe
- Species: E. palmeri

Binomial name
- Erythranthe palmeri (A.Gray) N.S.Fraga

Synonyms
- Mimulus palmeri A.Gray

= Erythranthe palmeri =

Species of flowering plant

Erythranthe palmeri is a species of monkeyflower known by the common name Palmer's monkeyflower. It was formerly known as Mimulus palmeri. It is endemic to the San Bernardino and San Gabriel mountains of southern California, where it grows in springtime-wet depressions and creek banks on granitic soils from 1,000 to 2,200 meters elevation.

== Description ==
Erythranthe palmeri is a hairy annual herb growing up to about 28 centimeters in maximum height with a thin, spindly stem. The oppositely arranged linear to oval leaves are under 3 centimeters long.

The tubular base of the flower is encapsulated in a ribbed calyx of sepals with pointed lobes. The flower has a narrow throat and wide five-lobed face. It is one or two centimeters long and usually deep pinkish purple with variable yellow and purple markings in the mouth.

== Taxonomy ==
The species was first described as Mimulus palmeri by Asa Gray in 1877. Naomi Fraga (2012) and others circumscribe E. palmeri to include populations from the San Bernardino and San Gabriel mountains, and distinguish it from related species including E. androsacea, E. purpurea, E. diffusa, E. hardhamiae, E. rhodopetra, and E. sierrae.
