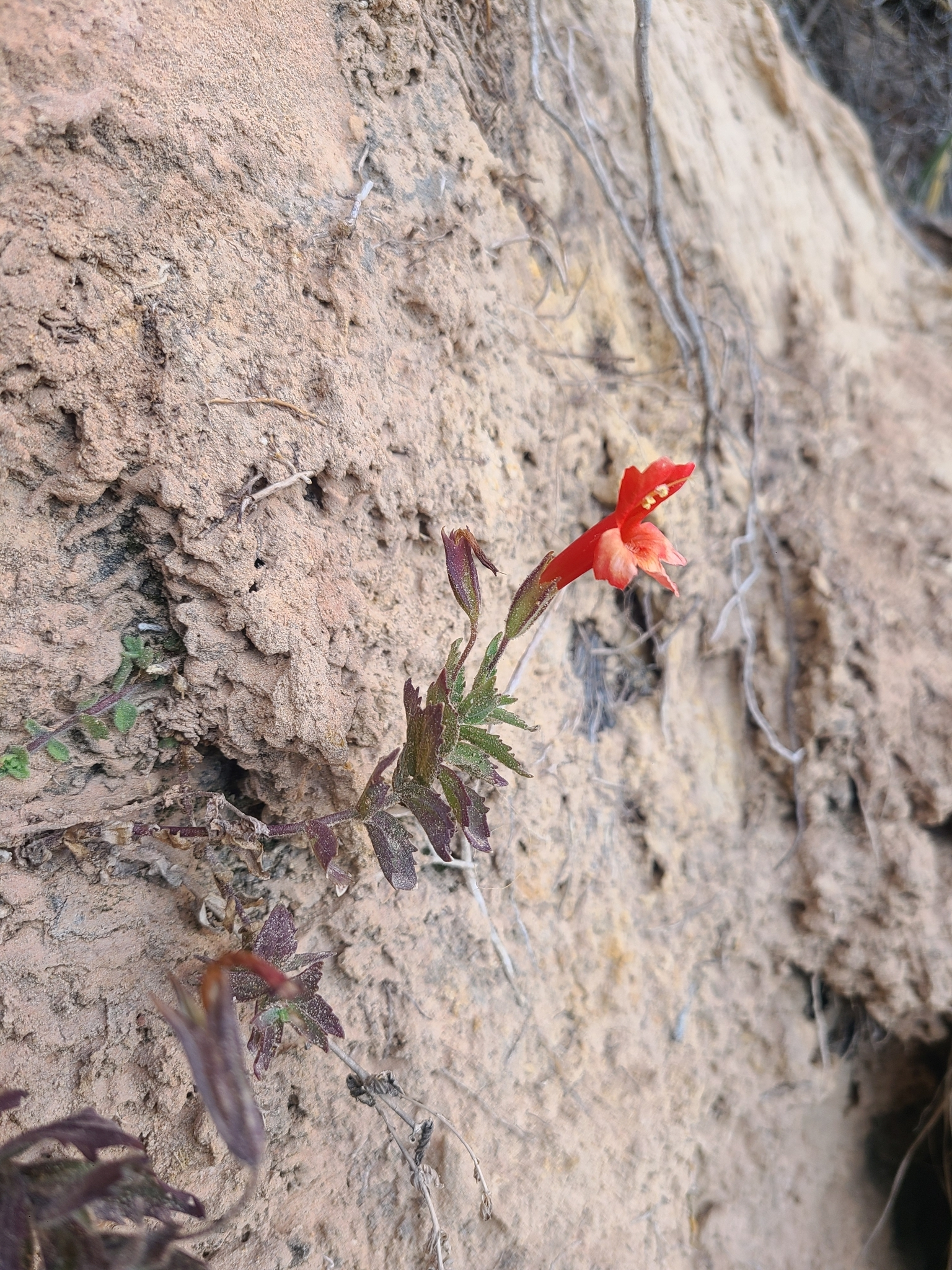
- In Bears Ears National Monument

Conservation status
- Vulnerable (NatureServe)

Scientific classification
- Kingdom: Plantae
- Clade: Embryophytes
- Clade: Tracheophytes
- Clade: Angiosperms
- Clade: Eudicots
- Clade: Asterids
- Order: Lamiales
- Family: Phrymaceae
- Genus: Erythranthe
- Species: E. eastwoodiae

Binomial name
- Erythranthe eastwoodiae (Rydb.) G.L.Nesom & N.S.Fraga

Synonyms
- Mimulus eastwoodiae Rydb.

= Erythranthe eastwoodiae =

Plant species in the lopseed family

Erythranthe eastwoodiae, commonly Eastwood's monkeyflower, is a plant that grows in moist areas of sandstone called hanging gardens in the desert canyonlands.

== Description ==
Eastwood's monkeyflower is a herbaceous plant with stems that climb up nearby surfaces or hang downwards reaching a length of as much as 40 centimeters (16 in), though more typically 5 to 30 cm (2–12 in). The stems do not usually branch and are covered glandular tipped hairs, often of a mixture of lengths. The plants produce stolons, stems that will root to produce new plants, but can also occasionally produce underground rhizomes.

It has bright red flowers that are tubular and open to a broad mouth with an upper and lower lip. The length of the fused petals is 3 to 4 centimeters long, with the tube 2 to 3 cm of the length. Flowers can appear as early as May or as late as November, but are rare after September. Each flower lasts for as much as five days.

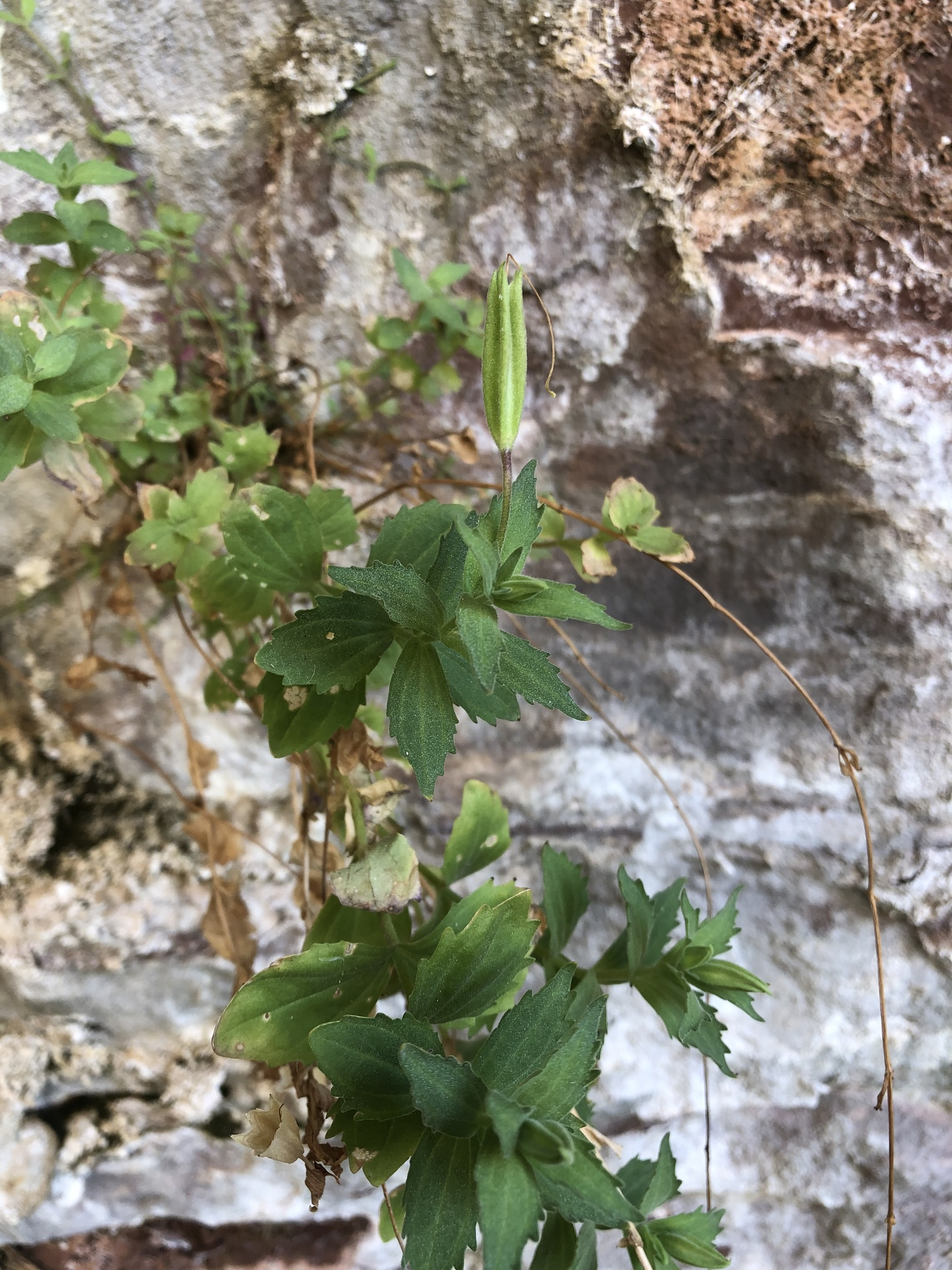
Plant with seed pod in Canyonlands National Park

The fruit is a capsule that measures 6–10 millimeters long.

== Taxonomy ==
Erythranthe eastwoodiae was scientifically described in 1913 by Per Axel Rydberg and named Mimulus eastwoodiae. The first specimens were collected by Alice Eastwood in 1895, but initially misidentified as Mimulus cardinalis. This specimen was unfortunately destroyed in the 1906 San Francisco Earthquake, but Rydberg visited the same location in 1913. Recognizing that it was a new species he named it after Eastwood. In 2012 it was moved to the genus Erythranthe by Guy L. Nesom and Naomi Fraga. Together with its genus it is classified in the Phrymaceae family. It is most closely related to Erythranthe verbenacea. It has no subspecies or other synonyms.

=== Names ===
The species name, eastwoodiae, was selected by Rydberg to honor Alice Eastwood, a botanist who worked at the California Academy of Sciences. Erythranthe eastwoodiae is known by the common names Eastwood's monkeyflower or scarlet monkey flower.

== Range and habitat ==
Eastwood's monkeyflower has a somewhat uncertain native range. According to World Plants and Plants of the World Online it grows in five US states, Arizona, Colorado, New Mexico, Nevada, and Utah, and also the Mexican state of Sonora. The Natural Resources Conservation Service (NRCS) list the same five US states, but does not have a precise location for the populations in Nevada. However, according to NatureServe, it is only found in Colorado, Utah, and Arizona. According to NatureServe there are eight populations in four western counties, Montrose, Mesa, San Miguel, and Delta. Using NRCS data, it is just found in San Juan County the northeastern most county of New Mexico. It is much more widespread in Utah, growing in five southern counties, and is recorded in Apache, Navajo, and Coconino counties in Arizona.

It grows from areas where water seeps from sandstone rock formations including overhangs, caves, crevices, and cliff bases. In these hanging gardens it is safe from most human activities, but vulnerable to changing groundwater due to climate change or water project development. It is associated with the Mancos columbine (Aquilegia micrantha), another hanging garden specialist, and the stream orchid (Epipactis gigantea).

== Ecology ==
Eastwood's monkeyflower is pollinated by hummingbirds. Both this species and Erythranthe rupestris, a rare species from Mexico, have a high rate of asexual reproduction.
