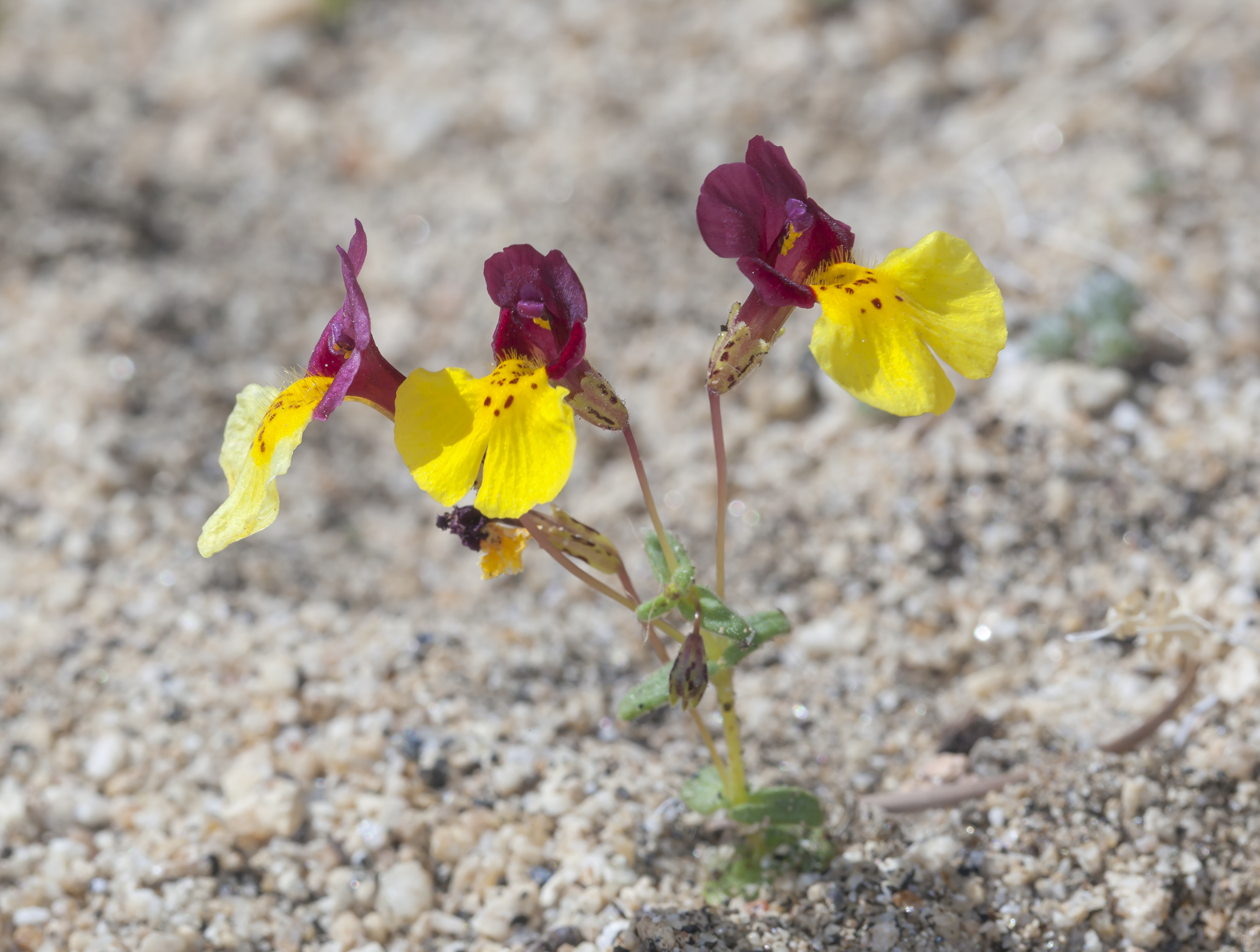

Conservation status
- Critically Imperiled (NatureServe)

Scientific classification
- Kingdom: Plantae
- Clade: Embryophytes
- Clade: Tracheophytes
- Clade: Angiosperms
- Clade: Eudicots
- Clade: Asterids
- Order: Lamiales
- Family: Phrymaceae
- Genus: Erythranthe
- Species: E. shevockii

Binomial name
- Erythranthe shevockii (Heckard & Bacig.) N.S.Fraga (2012)

Synonyms
- Mimulus shevockii Heckard & Bacig. (1986)

= Erythranthe shevockii =

Species of flowering plant

Erythranthe shevockii is a rare species of monkeyflower known by the common name Kelso Creek monkeyflower. It was formerly known as Mimulus shevockii.

== Distribution ==
Erythranthe shevockii is endemic to the southern Sierra Nevada in Kern County, California, where it is known from about 10 occurrences near Lake Isabella. It grows in granitic, alluvial soils in dry washes and Joshua tree woodlands where the Sierra Nevada transitions to the Mojave Desert.

== Description ==
Erythranthe shevockii is an annual herb up to about 12 centimeters tall with a very slender, often red stem. The oppositely arranged oval leaves are no more than a centimeter long each and are sometimes fused together in pairs about the stem.

The tubular base of the flower is encapsulated in a red or red-spotted calyx of sepals. The flower has a narrow tube throat and wide face, and is roughly a centimeter long. The corolla is divided into a deep maroon red upper lip and a wider lower lip which is yellow with red dots.

The plant sometimes hybridizes with its relative, Erythranthe androsacea.
