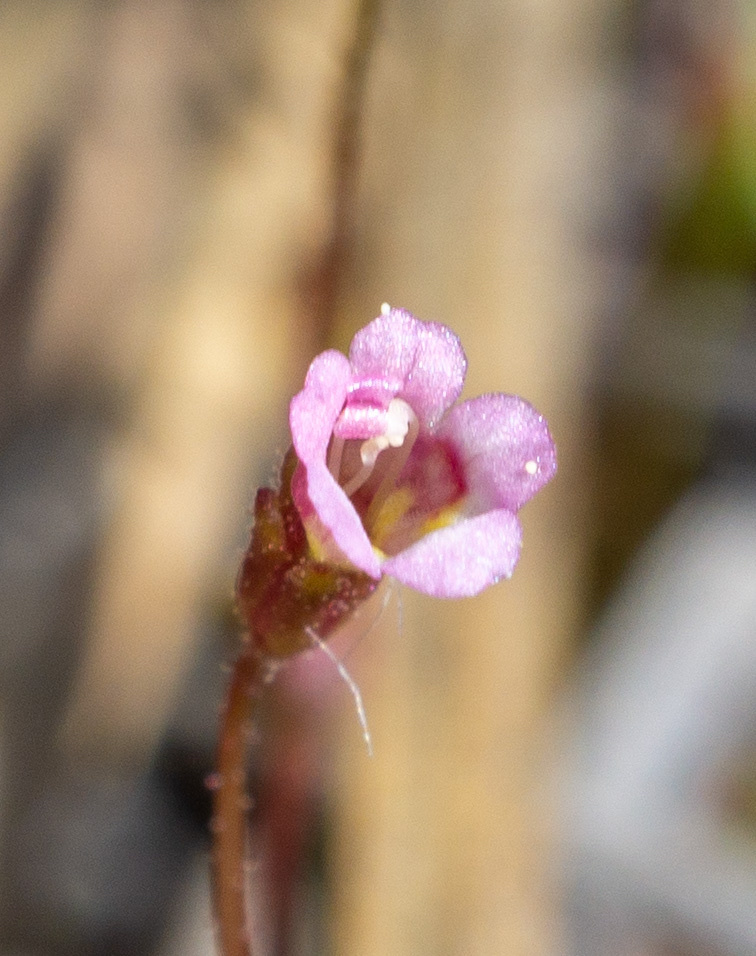

Conservation status
- Imperiled (NatureServe)

Scientific classification
- Kingdom: Plantae
- Clade: Embryophytes
- Clade: Tracheophytes
- Clade: Angiosperms
- Clade: Eudicots
- Clade: Asterids
- Order: Lamiales
- Family: Phrymaceae
- Genus: Erythranthe
- Species: E. exigua

Binomial name
- Erythranthe exigua (A.Gray) G.L.Nesom & N.S.Fraga

Synonyms
- Mimulus exiguus A.Gray

= Erythranthe exigua =

Species of flowering plant

Erythranthe exigua is a rare species of monkeyflower known by the common name San Bernardino Mountains monkeyflower. It was formerly known as Mimulus exiguus.

== Distribution and habitat ==
It is native to the San Bernardino Mountains of southern California, as well as an area of Baja California. It grows in moist, rocky habitat, including the rare quartz pebble plain habitat of the mountain meadows near Big Bear, Southern California, from 1,800 to 2,300 meters elevation. It is also known from the Sierra de Juárez and Sierra de San Pedro Mártir in northern Baja California.

== Description ==
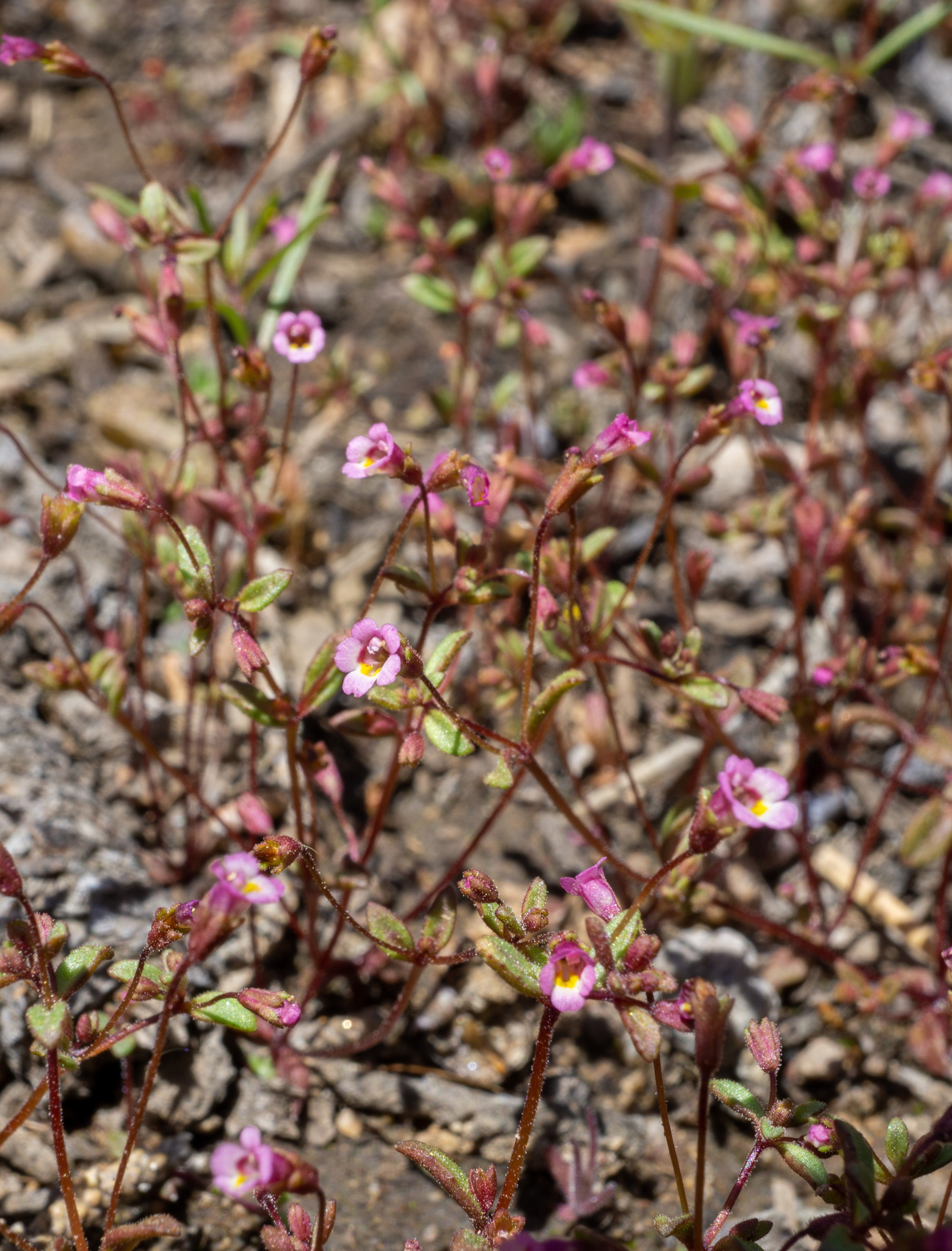
Near Angeles National Forest, 2023

Erythranthe exigua is a petite annual herb producing a hair-thin, erect stem just a few centimeters tall. The herbage is reddish in color and lightly hairy. The oppositely arranged oval leaves are a few millimeters in length. The tubular lavender flower is under 4 millimeters long and the corolla is divided into five lobes.
