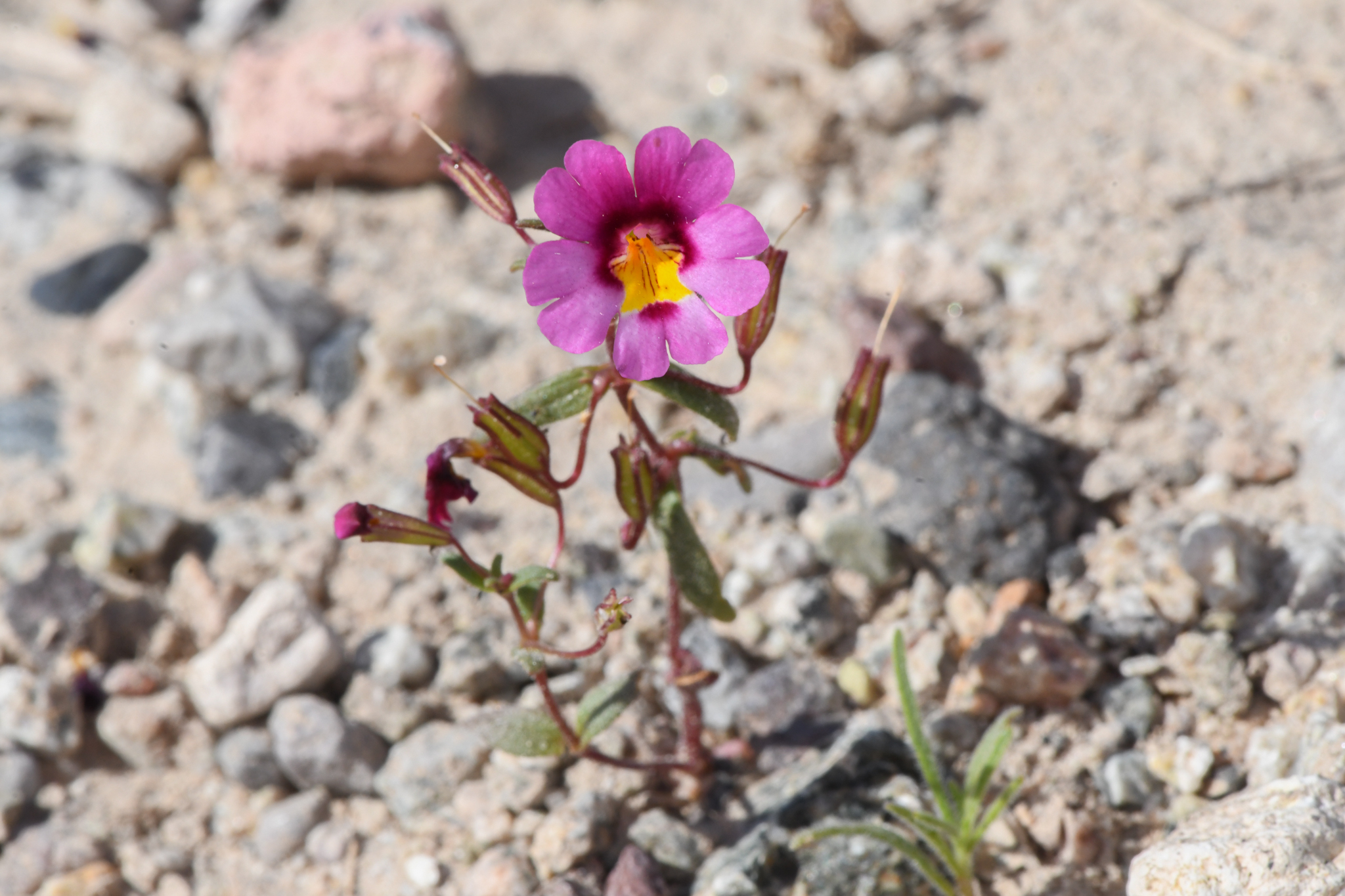
- Kern County, California, 2023

Conservation status
- Critically Imperiled (NatureServe)

Scientific classification
- Kingdom: Plantae
- Clade: Embryophytes
- Clade: Tracheophytes
- Clade: Angiosperms
- Clade: Eudicots
- Clade: Asterids
- Order: Lamiales
- Family: Phrymaceae
- Genus: Erythranthe
- Species: E. rhodopetra

Binomial name
- Erythranthe rhodopetra N.S.Fraga

= Erythranthe rhodopetra =

Species of flowering plant

Erythranthe rhodopetra, also known as the Red Rock Canyon monkeyflower, is a species of flowering plant. Erythranthe rhodopetra is a rare plant native to the El Paso Mountains in the Mojave Desert of eastern Kern County, California. According to the California Native Plant Society, "Known only from the El Paso Mtns. Many occurrences historical; need field surveys. Possibly threatened by mining, vehicles, recreational activities, foot traffic, and non-native plants. Previously identified as, and similar to, E. palmeri."
