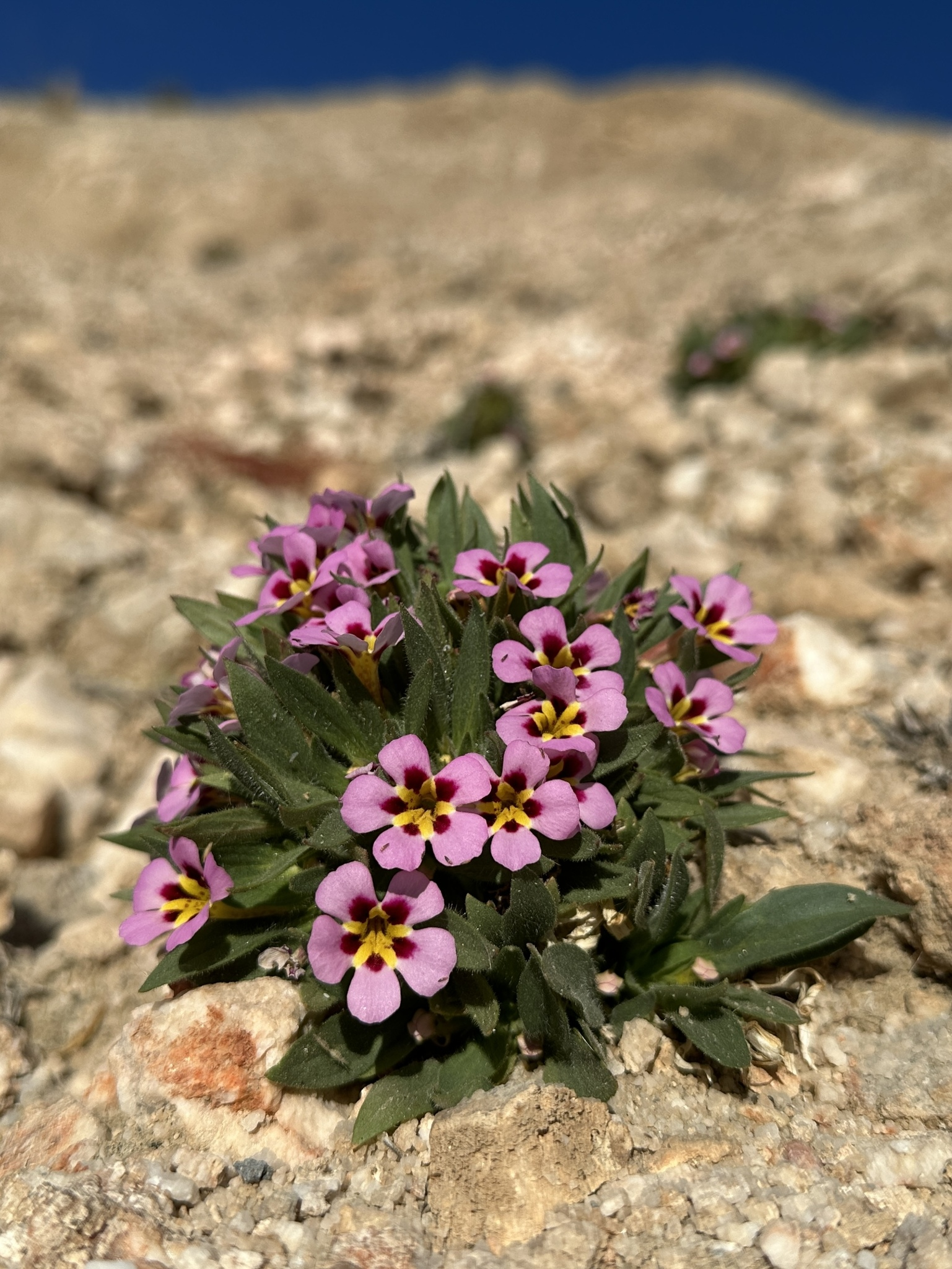

Conservation status
- Apparently Secure (NatureServe)

Scientific classification
- Kingdom: Plantae
- Clade: Embryophytes
- Clade: Tracheophytes
- Clade: Angiosperms
- Clade: Eudicots
- Clade: Asterids
- Order: Lamiales
- Family: Phrymaceae
- Genus: Diplacus
- Species: D. rupicola

Binomial name
- Diplacus rupicola (Coville & A.L.Grant) G.L.Nesom & N.S.Fraga

Synonyms
- Mimulus rupicola Coville & A.L.Grant

= Diplacus rupicola =

Species of flowering plant

Diplacus rupicola, the Death Valley monkeyflower, is a flowering plant in the family Phrymaceae.

== Distribution ==
Diplacus rupicola is endemic to the northern Mojave Desert within Inyo County, in eastern California.

Although quite rare, the Death Valley monkeyflower can be found in shaded limestone crevices on steep canyon walls in the mountains bordering Death Valley, and the sky islands in the northern Mojave Desert.

== Description ==
Diplacus rupicola is a perennial herbaceous plant, growing 1–17 cm tall, with oblanceolate leaves 2–6 cm long. It has pinkish flowers, often faint in color, and has a magenta-purple spot on each lobe.
