= Purple monkeyflower =

Purple monkeyflower is a common name for several plants and may refer to:

- Diplacus nanus, dwarf purple monkeyflower
- Erythranthe lewisii, great purple monkeyflower
- Erythranthe purpurea, little purple monkeyflower
