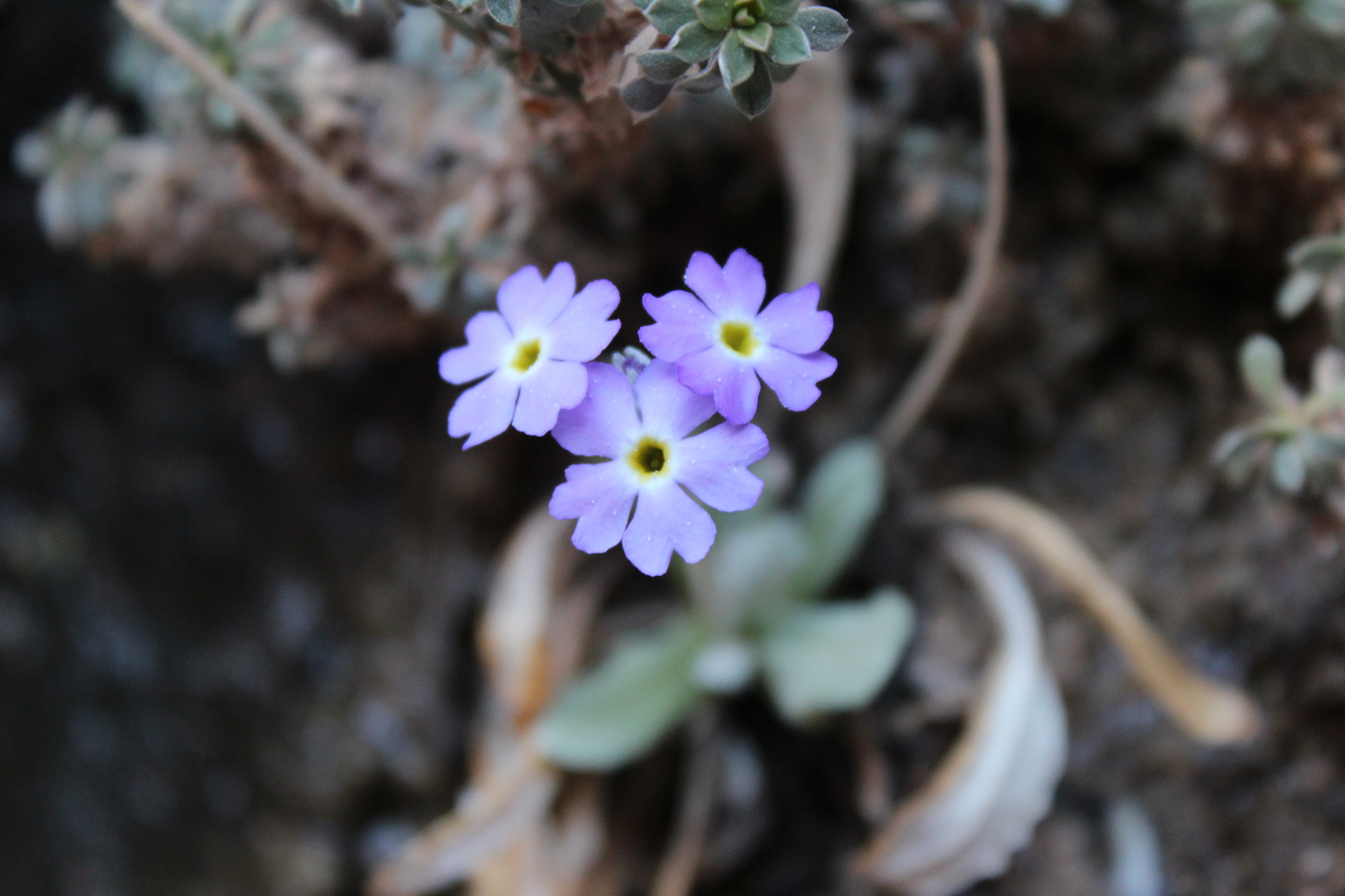

Conservation status
- Apparently Secure (NatureServe)

Scientific classification
- Kingdom: Plantae
- Clade: Embryophytes
- Clade: Tracheophytes
- Clade: Angiosperms
- Clade: Eudicots
- Clade: Asterids
- Order: Ericales
- Family: Primulaceae
- Genus: Primula
- Species: P. specuicola

Binomial name
- Primula specuicola Rydb.

Synonyms
- Primula farinosa subsp. specuicola; Primula hunnewellii

= Primula specuicola =

Species of flowering plant

Primula specuicola, commonly the cave primrose or cavedwelling primrose, is perennial plant in the primrose family (Primulaceae) found in the Colorado Plateau and Canyonlands region of the southwestern United States.

== Description ==
=== Growth pattern ===
It is a perennial plant from 2 to 11 inches (5.1 to 27.9 cm) tall with withered leaves at the base.

=== Leaves and stems ===
3/4 to 8 inches (1.9 to 20.3 cm) leaves are green on top and whitish underneath, spatula shaped (spatulate) to elliptical, and sometimes toothed at the margins.

=== Inflorescence and fruit ===
It is one of the earliest bloomers in its habitat, blooming from February to June. "Primula" means first, referring to the early bloom time of the genus. The inflorescence is a cluster of flowers at the end of a leafless stalk. The flowers are lavender to pink, have a corolla tube with a yellow ring at the mouth, and then flare into five lobes, with two lobes at the end of each of the 5.

== Taxonomy ==
Primula specuicola was scientifically described and named by Per Axel Rydberg in 1913. It is classified in the genus Primula within the family Primulaceae. It has no accepted subspecies, but was described as a subspecies of Primula farinosa by William Wright Smith and George Forrest in 1928. It also has one heterotypic synonym, Primula hunnewellii described by Merritt Lyndon Fernald in 1934.

=== Names ===
Primula specuicola is known by the common names cave primrose, cavedwelling primrose, or cave-dwelling primrose. It is also known as Easter flower for its spring bloom time.

== Habitat and range ==
It only grows in the Colorado Plateau (endemic) near seeps and hanging gardens.
