= Hanging garden (habitat) =

Desert habitat of southwestern United States

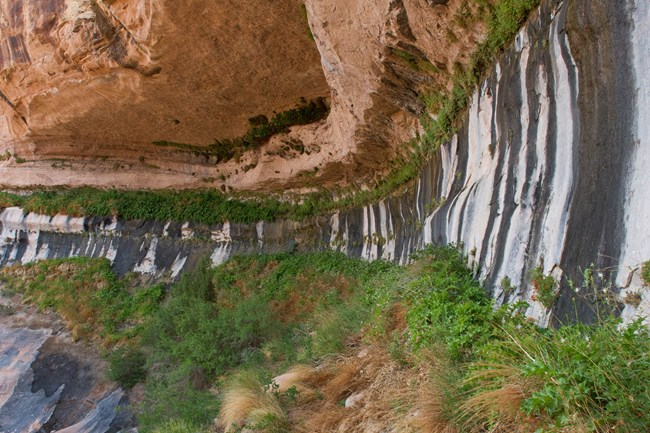
Water seeps from base of permeable sandstone at contact with impermeable shale forming a small hanging garden

A hanging garden is a habitat found in the walls of dry canyons of the Colorado Plateau in the southwestern United States. Several species of flora of the Colorado Plateau and Canyonlands region are endemic to the hanging gardens, and the habitat also hosts animals and other plants.

== Description ==
The Colorado Plateau is an elevated region in the southwestern United States largely covered by the Colorado Plateau shrublands. It is a cold semi-arid climate largely dominated by dry adapted plants of shrublands, pinyon–juniper woodlands, and desert grasslands at lower elevations. Isolated within the larger dry landscapes are areas with more water resources due to water seeps emerging from sandstone canyon walls and shaded by the high canyon walls. They are created by aquifers in the sandstone being perched on top of impermeable layers and then cut through by the rivers and floods to expose the aquifer allowing the water to escape. This creates a community of plants that prefer evenly moist conditions in contrast to the surrounding dry landscapes and the rivers side communities. The shape of the area formed by erosion is also important to the formation of a hanging garden as it must be protected both from excessive sun exposure, from runoff that could wash away soils needed by hanging garden plants, and from being too near a flowing stream or river that would encourage riparian plant species.

Hanging gardens can be very small areas with just one species or more than 300 meters (980 ft) in length with the habitat extending up to 200 meters (660 ft) down from the seep line.

== Ecology ==
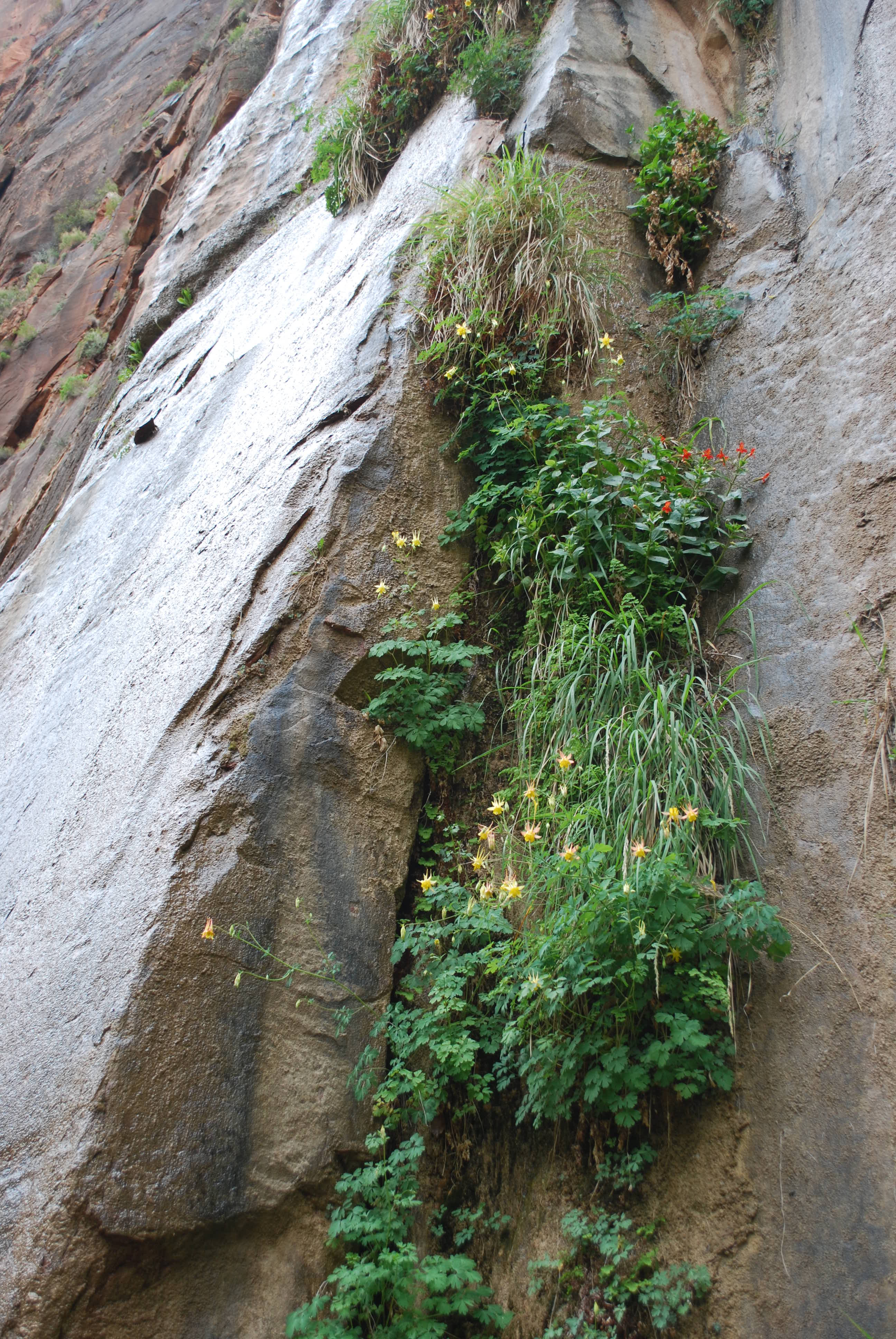
A hanging garden in bloom on the Riverside Walk, Zion National Park

Within areas managed by the National Park Service, there 125 native plant species have been documented in hanging gardens and 19 introduced species, with 12 species of plant that are endemic to the Colorado Plateau. Four species of amphibian are known to inhabit hanging gardens, the canyon treefrog (Dryophytes arenicolor), red-spotted toad (Anaxyrus punctatus), Woodhouse's toad (Anaxyrus woodhousii) and northern leopard frog (Rana pipiens).

Several species are endemic to the hanging gardens including the cave primrose (Primula specuicola), Eastwood's monkeyflower (Erythranthe eastwoodiae), and the alcove bog orchid (Platanthera zothecina). Likewise, the Mancos columbine (Aquilegia micrantha) is nearly always found in hanging gardens. In addition the alcove death camas (Anticlea elegans subsp. vaginata) is a rare subspecies that only grows in hanging gardens.

== History ==
The first scientific documentation of the hanging gardens were by John Wesley Powell, who called them oak glens, in Glen Canyon. The earliest published plant surveys were by Alice Eastwood in 1896 who documented the hanging gardens near Bluff, Utah, though she also noted that her collections were very incomplete due to just having eight days for the entirety of her trip from Mancos, Colorado to Willow Creek in southeastern Utah. Significant collections were made by Elzada Clover and Lois Jotter in 1938 during expeditions down the Colorado River through the Grand Canyon and by Clover during followup explorations of side canyons in 1939.
