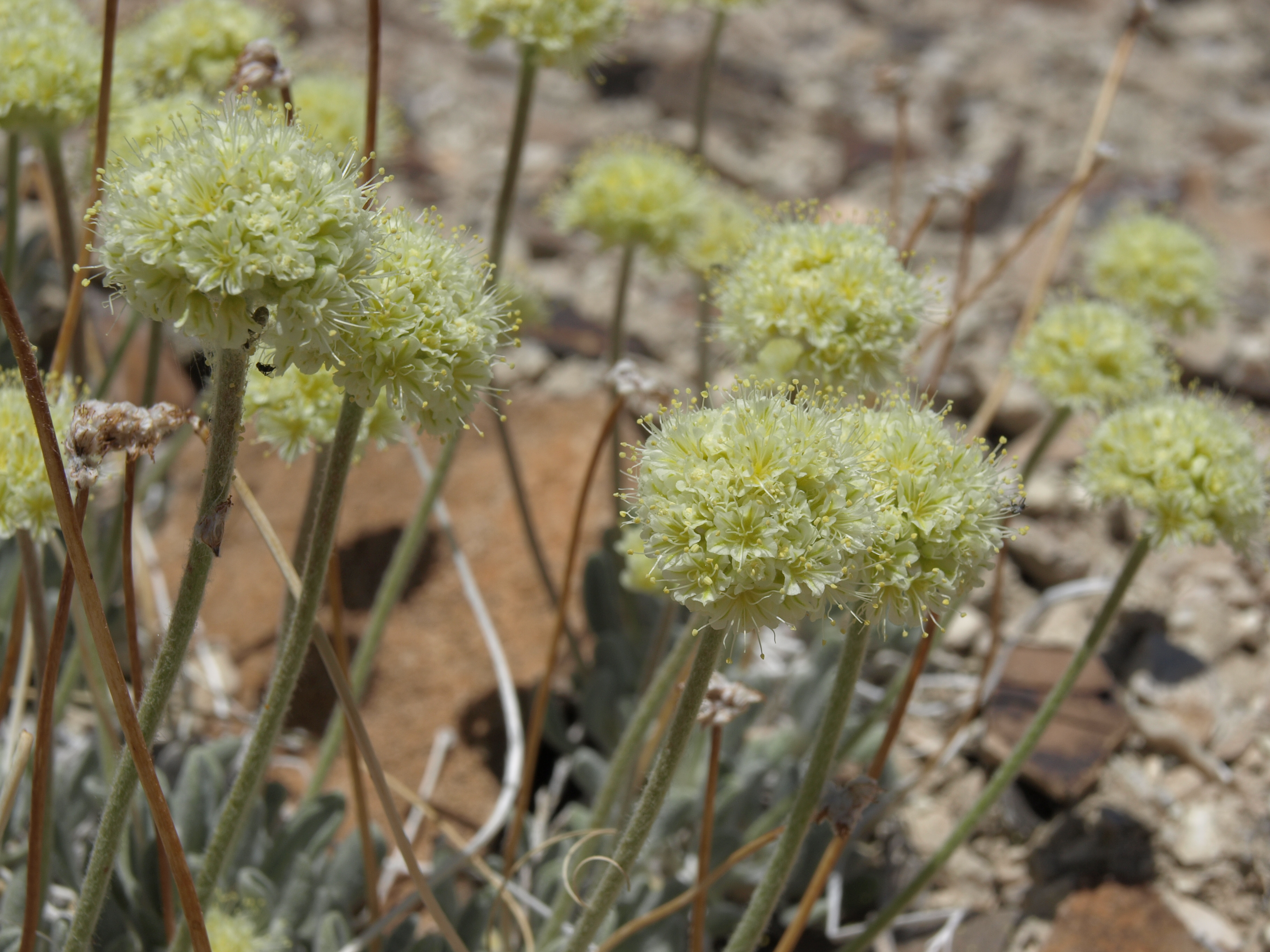

Conservation status
- Critically Imperiled (NatureServe)

- Endangered (ESA)

Scientific classification
- Kingdom: Plantae
- Clade: Tracheophytes
- Clade: Angiosperms
- Clade: Eudicots
- Order: Caryophyllales
- Family: Polygonaceae
- Genus: Eriogonum
- Species: E. tiehmii

Binomial name
- Eriogonum tiehmii Reveal

= Eriogonum tiehmii =

Species of buckwheat plant endemic to Nevada

Eriogonum tiehmii, known as Tiehm's buckwheat, is a species of flowering plant endemic to the Silver Peak Range of Esmeralda County, Nevada, in the United States. Its only known population is at high risk of destruction due to proposed mining for lithium (used for batteries in electric vehicles) by the Australian company Ioneer. In 2020, a noticeable decline in the known population was attributed to herbivory.

== Taxonomy ==
It was first formally named by American botanist James L. Reveal in 1985 in The Great Basin Naturalist. Reveal named the plant for Arnold "Jerry" Tiehm who first collected the species in 1983, while working at the New York Botanical Garden and hiking through the American West in search of new plants.

== Description ==
Eriogonum tiehmii is a small, perennial herbaceous plant, growing about 30 cm (12 in) across and up to 16 cm (6 in) tall with blue-grey leaves. The leaves are 1 to 2 cm (0.4 to 0.8 in) long and 5 to 8 mm (0.2 to 0.3 in) across with white or grey hairs on both surfaces, sometimes losing the hairs on the upper surface as it ages. It flowers briefly in the spring, after rains, with a small round yellow bloom.

== Conservation status ==
Tiehm's buckwheat is considered critically imperiled ("at very high risk of extinction or elimination") due to its small population, highly localized and specialized habitat, and threat from a proposed lithium mine. Tiehm was once quoted as saying "you could wipe the buckwheat out with a bulldozer in a couple of hours". Mining exploration has increased the prevalence of invasive species in its habitat. As of 2022, a planned 640-acre (260 ha) open-pit lithium mine by Ioneer is expected to destroy up to 90% of the habitat and approximately 50–70% of the known population. There have been efforts by conservation groups, including the Center for Biological Diversity, to gain federal protection for the species and to block lithium exploration in its habitat. Research funded by Ioneer has been conducted to investigate a possible relocation of the plants, but results have shown that the buckwheat does not react well to soil from other locations, having evolved for the combination of lithium, boron, and clay in its current habitat.

Dan Patterson, a whistleblower from the Bureau of Land Management who previously worked for the Centre for Biological Diversity, accused Ioneer of applying for exploration permits in a manner designed to avoid environmental reviews, which can be time-consuming and costly. Patterson filed a larger complaint arguing that the BLM district office had a pattern of rapid approval of projects without appropriate concern for environmental laws, turning the region into a "clearinghouse for federal permits" and under-staffed mining inspections, perhaps related to a Trump administration directive to "increase activity at all levels of the supply chain" relating to critical minerals such as lithium that, as of 2022, is predominantly imported to the United States rather than produced domestically. In a 2020 interview, Patterson said that, since 2017, the BLM had permitted "far more development on public lands than the agency could ever monitor or enforce", having himself been the sole environmental protection specialist at the BLM field office in Tonopah, Nevada, responsible for compliance oversight of roughly 6,000,000 acres (2,400,000 ha) of public lands.

Between July and September 2020, estimates ranging from "a few thousand" (Ioneer Chairman James Calaway, quoted in Sonner, 2020) to as much as 17,000 plants (Center for Biological Diversity, or up to 40% of the population, were damaged or destroyed in a very short period of time. Conservation biologists at the University of Nevada, Reno, land management agencies, including the BLM and USFWS, and Ioneer concluded that the damage was caused by burrowing rodents, supported by evidence from an environmental DNA ("eDNA") analysis conducted by the US Fish & Wildlife Service, in addition to other wildlife surveys that included the use of game cameras. Others, including the Center for Biological Diversity (CBD) and Eriogonum researcher and Assistant Professor Benjamin Grady, PhD, support a theory that systematic, targeted human vandalism was the cause of the losses. Botanist Naomi Fraga agreed with the CBD and Dr. Grady noting that curiously it was only the Eriogonum that had been torn up and "strewn about—thousands and thousands of plants all across the habitat ... it wasn't happening to any other plants". Subsequent surveys have noted similar damage to storage organs (roots) in nearby desert plants, presumably caused by rodents seeking water in an exceptionally dry year. The extensive damage to the critically endangered plants has prompted calls for increased protection of the plants, rehabilitation of the depredated area, and cessation of lithium exploration in the area.

In 2021, conservationists, including Grady and Fraga, petitioned the USFWS to list Eriogonum tiehmii under the Endangered Species Act, stating that the lithium mining project at Rhyolite Ridge could have "an immense impact on the overall resiliency and continued viability of the species," as the subpopulation threatened by the mine is also the most productive at recruitment. The Fish and Wildlife Service failed to issue a final rule on the proposal within a year, as required by federal law. The plant was declared endangered in December 2022, effective 17 January 2023. Since the listing of Tiehm's buckwheat as an endangered species, Ioneer has established a conservation center with a dedicated greenhouse to grow Tiehm's buckwheat and has modified its mine plan to fence off the known populations of the plant and to disturb no more than about 38% of the known critical habitat for the plant.
