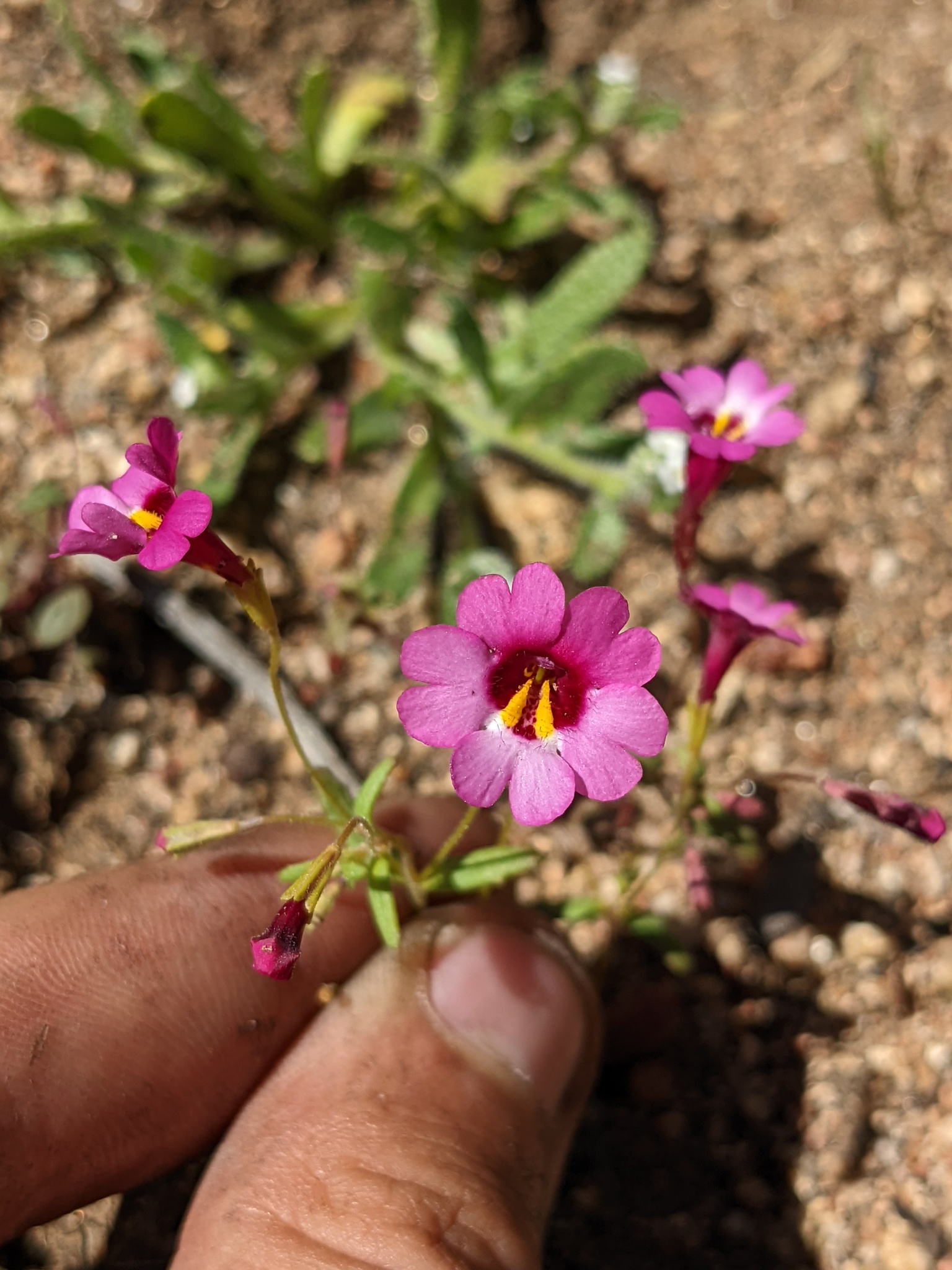

Conservation status
- Apparently Secure (NatureServe)

Scientific classification
- Kingdom: Plantae
- Clade: Embryophytes
- Clade: Tracheophytes
- Clade: Angiosperms
- Clade: Eudicots
- Clade: Asterids
- Order: Lamiales
- Family: Phrymaceae
- Genus: Erythranthe
- Species: E. diffusa

Binomial name
- Erythranthe diffusa (A.L.Grant) N.S.Fraga

Synonyms
- Mimulus diffusus A.L.Grant; Mimulus grantianus Eastw.

= Erythranthe diffusa =

Species of flowering plant

Erythranthe diffusa, also known as Palomar monkeyflower, is a species of plant native to Baja California and California. It is considered a rare plant due to its limited range. E. diffusa grows up to 8 in (20 cm) in height, and produces purple, pink, and yellow flowers. It prefers to grow in gravelly or sandy soil in chaparral or a low-elevation coniferous habitat. E. diffusa has been observed in Los Angeles County, Orange County, Riverside County, San Diego County, Santa Clara County, and Baja California. It grows in chaparral openings and meadows in oak and pine woodland, typically on granite-derived soils, in the South Coast Ranges and Peninsular Ranges from 300 to 2,100 meters elevation. The Palomar monkeyflower is threatened by recreational activities and real estate development of its preferred wild habitat.
