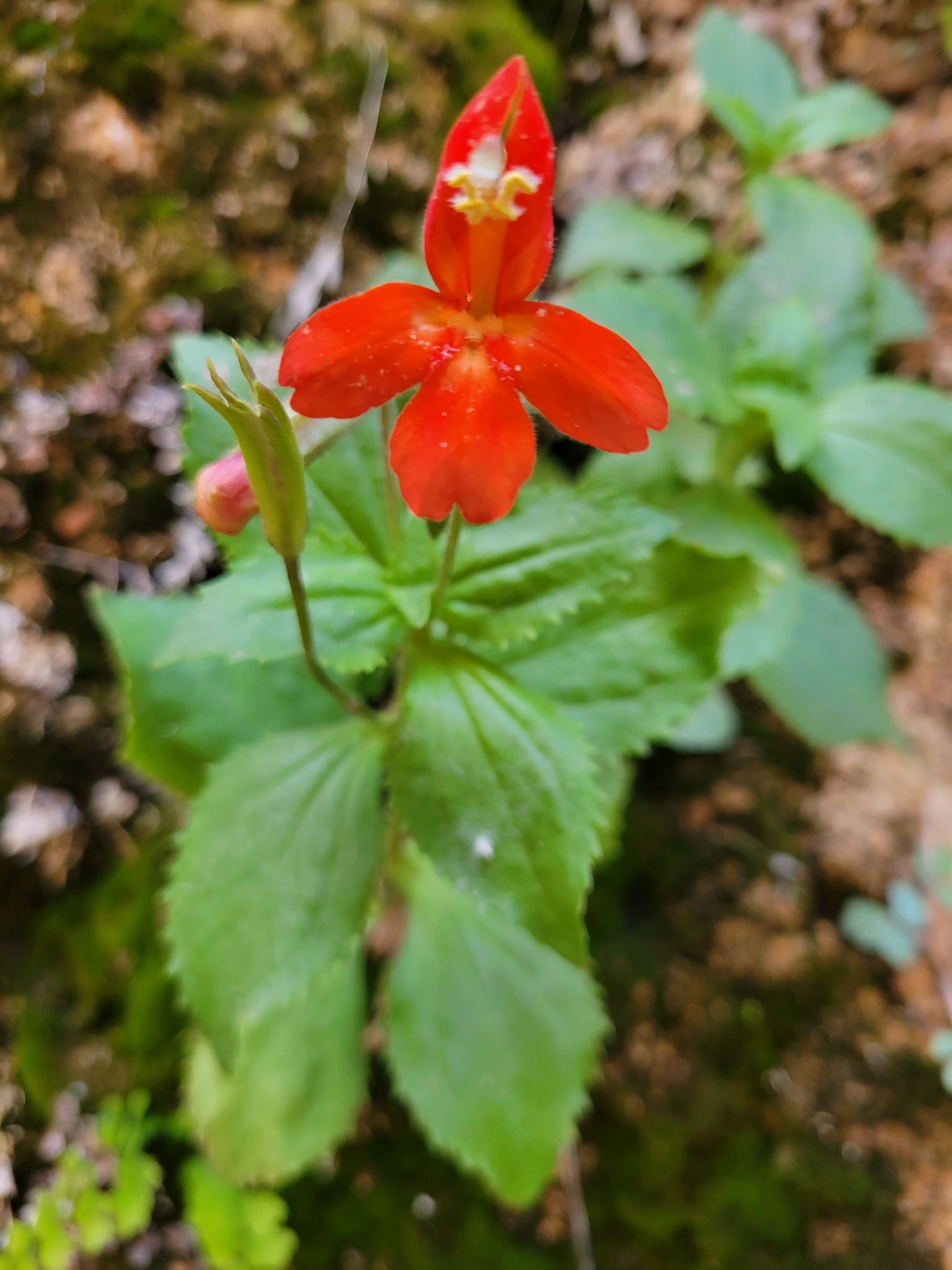
- Zion National Park, Utah, 2023

Conservation status
- Vulnerable (NatureServe)

Scientific classification
- Kingdom: Plantae
- Clade: Embryophytes
- Clade: Tracheophytes
- Clade: Angiosperms
- Clade: Eudicots
- Clade: Asterids
- Order: Lamiales
- Family: Phrymaceae
- Genus: Erythranthe
- Species: E. verbenacea

Binomial name
- Erythranthe verbenacea (Greene) G.L.Nesom & N.S.Fraga

Synonyms
- Mimulus cardinalis var. verbenaceus (Greene) Kearney & Peebles; Mimulus lugens Greene; Mimulus verbenaceus Greene

= Erythranthe verbenacea =

Species of flowering plant

Erythranthe verbenacea, also known as crimson monkeyflower, is a species of flowering plant native to western North America. This plant usually grows near desert watering places, and has been observed in the southwestern U.S. states of Utah and Arizona, and in several northern Mexican states including Sonora, Chihuahua, Durango, Sinaloa, and Baja California.
