= Ioneer =

Ioneer Ltd.
- Formerly: Global Geoscience Limited
- Traded as: ASX: INR; Nasdaq: IONR (ADS)
- Industry: Metal mining
- Founded: 2001
- Headquarters: Sydney, New South Wales, Australia
- Website: https://www.ioneer.com

ioneer Ltd. is a lithium-boron supplier founded in 2001 and headquartered in Sydney, New South Wales. The company states that they are "intent on pioneering the production of materials necessary for a sustainable future." They are developing a Nevada mine site known as Rhyolite Ridge in order to be a future producer of lithium-boron.

The Rhyolite Ridge project has raised controversy as it may threaten some populations of a rare wildflower, Tiehm's buckwheat (Eriogonum tiehmii), an edaphic endemic to the project area. The conflict over the conservation of the plants has sparked debate over whether the sustainability benefits of lithium extraction outweigh the fate of the buckwheat.

== History ==
- ioneer, Ltd. was listed on ASX in 2007 under the name Global Geoscience Limited
- An option over Rhyolite Ridge was acquired in June 2016 and the purchase of a 100% interest in the project was completed in July 2017.
- In 2017, Global Geoscience secured ownership of the Rhyolite Ridge Lithium-Boron Project
- In 2018, the company changed its name from Global Geoscience to ioneer, which is a combination of the words “ion” and “pioneer.” The new name reflects the company’s new focus and commitment to becoming an important producer of the materials necessary for a sustainable future.
- In April 2020, ioneer announced the results of a Definitive Feasibility Study validating the robust economics and viability of Rhyolite Ridge
- On November 18, 2020, ioneer became a founding member of the Zero Emission Transportation Association (ZETA) in the US. ZETA is advocating for 100% electric vehicle sales throughout the light-, medium-, and heavy-duty sectors by 2030.

== Rhyolite Ridge Lithium-Boron Project ==
Ioneer is developing the Rhyolite Ridge Lithium-Boron Project. Rhyolite Ridge is a large, shallow lithium-boron deposit located close to existing infrastructure in Esmeralda County, Nevada. Rhyolite Ridge is the only known deposit in North America (and one of two globally) with commercial amounts of high-grade lithium and boron. The mineralogy is geologically unique due the presence of the boron mineral Searlesite. The company completed a Definitive Feasibility Study (DFS) in August 2020, the first for a lithium project in the U.S. in over 50 years. The DFS estimates annual production of over 20,000 tonnes per year of lithium battery materials and 170,000 tonnes of borates per year. The DFS contemplates extracting 2.5 million tons of ore per year. Rhyolite Ridge has ore reserves of 60 million tonnes and a mineral resource of 146.4 million tonnes.

== Tiehm's buckwheat at Rhyolite Ridge ==
Tiehm’s buckwheat (Eriogonum tiehmii) is a low, cushion-forming perennial herb. Individual plants can be up to 12 inches in diameter and most plants are less than ten inches high. It was first identified at Rhyolite Ridge in 1983 by Arnold (Jerry) Tiehm. Located on 10 acres in Esmeralda County Nevada, Tiehm’s buckwheat is classified as a BLM Sensitive Species.

In October 2019, the Center for Biological Diversity submitted an emergency petition to the U.S. Fish and Wildlife Service (USFWS) to protect Tiehm's buckwheat under the Endangered Species Act.

In January 2020, the Center for Biological Diversity withdrew a lawsuit and voluntarily dismissed its case against the Bureau of Land Management related to certain notices to conduct exploration ioneer elected to intervene in the case and agreed to a settlement requiring additional measures to avoid impact on Tiehm’s buckwheat. In May 2020, ioneer submitted its project plan of operations for its proposed Rhyolite Ridge lithium-boron project in Nevada. In July 2020, the U.S. Fish and Wildlife Service announced that two rare plants, including Tiehm’s buckwheat, warranted a year-long review of whether to list them as endangered species.

On September 8, 2020, University of Nevada, Reno conducted a survey that observed that 25% - 50% of the plants had been damaged. The survey observed "apparent gnawing" on the roots of the plants and concluded that the damage was from small rodents.

On September 16, 2020, it was reported by the Center for Biological Diversity that about 40% of the population of the rare plants were destroyed.

Patrick Donnelly, Nevada state director at the Center for Biological Diversity, said:

This is an absolute tragedy. Tiehm’s buckwheat is one of the beautiful gems of Nevada’s biodiversity and some monster destroyed thousands of these irreplaceable flowering plants...This appears to have been a premeditated, somewhat organized, large-scale operation aimed at wiping out one of the rarest plants on Earth, one that was already in the pipeline for protection. It’s despicable and heartless." ioneer executive chairman James Calaway denied that the destruction was due to human activity.

According to information from EM Strategies' Biology Program Manager Kris Kuyper:

“Similar herbivory activity has been noted in other mat buckwheat in the area.” Immediately upon learning about the herbivore damage, ioneer began working with the Nevada Division of Forestry (“NDF”) and other regulatory bodies to facilitate a thorough investigation. The Company provided transect information, equipment, and access to the Company’s botanist and geologic experts to ensure the appropriate steps are taken to learn more about the nature of the event. With these findings, ioneer hopes to provide possible alternatives and effective measures to mitigate this latest threat from natural causes”

“I believe this would be very difficult or impossible to do with a trowel or other small, handheld digging implement humans would have had to use to excavate plants. However, it is exactly what I would expect to see if a small creature had dug through the dirt to reach the plant roots,” the technician on the survey wrote in response to the report by the Center for Biological Diversity.

The U.S. Fish & Wildlife Service and the US Bureau of Land Management conducted a DNA analysis of damaged Tiehm’s roots, nearby soils and rodent scat and identified the likely culprit as ground squirrels. The Center for Biological Diversity discounted the company's and USFWS claims, citing the lack of animal droppings or tracks, suggesting the work of humans. Dr. Jaqualine Grant, a scientist at Southern Utah University, who conducted the DNA analysis on behalf of USFWS, presented her work to the Utah Native Plant society on March 2, 2021, and concluded that “this evidence for rodents being part of Tiehm's buckwheat destruction is really strong….it’s quite convincing. She also stated “Overall there seems to be a lack of systematic collection of evidence to support this human poaching hypothesis.”

Dr. Benjamin Grady of Ripon College and President of the Eriogonum Society stated:

“After the dust settled, it appeared that either white-tailed antelope ground squirrels or pocket gophers were responsible for the damage to about 60% of the global population of this already rare species. It is hypothesized that the mammalian culprit was drawn to the roots of the wild buckwheat after a particularly dry and stressful summer.”

In February 2021, Ioneer released a statement acknowledging the change of administration - one very committed to electric vehicle production to help meet climate change mitigation goals - and reported its collaboration with The Conservation Fund to protect the Rhyolite Ridge Tiehm’s buckwheat. In a broader context, the proposed mine, like several other projects, presents a "green" conundrum of mining for EV batteries to reduce fossil-fueled transport versus species and ecosystem preservation.

In April 21, 2021, a federal judge gave the Fish and Wildlife Service 30 days to make a determination on whether to propose protection for Tiehm’s buckwheat.

On June 4, 2021 U.S. Fish and Wildlife published a 12-month finding that the petitioned action to list Tiehm’s buckwheat under the Endangered Species Act of 1973, as amended, is warranted. "The Service, therefore, will promptly publish a proposed rule to list Tiehm's buckwheat. We will open a public comment period at the time of publication of the proposed rule. Any information received from the public prior to the publication of the proposed rule will be considered and addressed when we address comments received on the proposed rule."

On October 7, 2021, U.S. Fish and Wildlife issued a proposed rule published in the Federal Register to list Tiehm’s buckwheat as an endangered species under the Endangered Species Act. The USFWS stated that the Rhyolite Ridge project could have "an immense impact on the overall resiliency and continued viability of the species," as the subpopulation threatened by the mine is also the most productive at recruitment.
