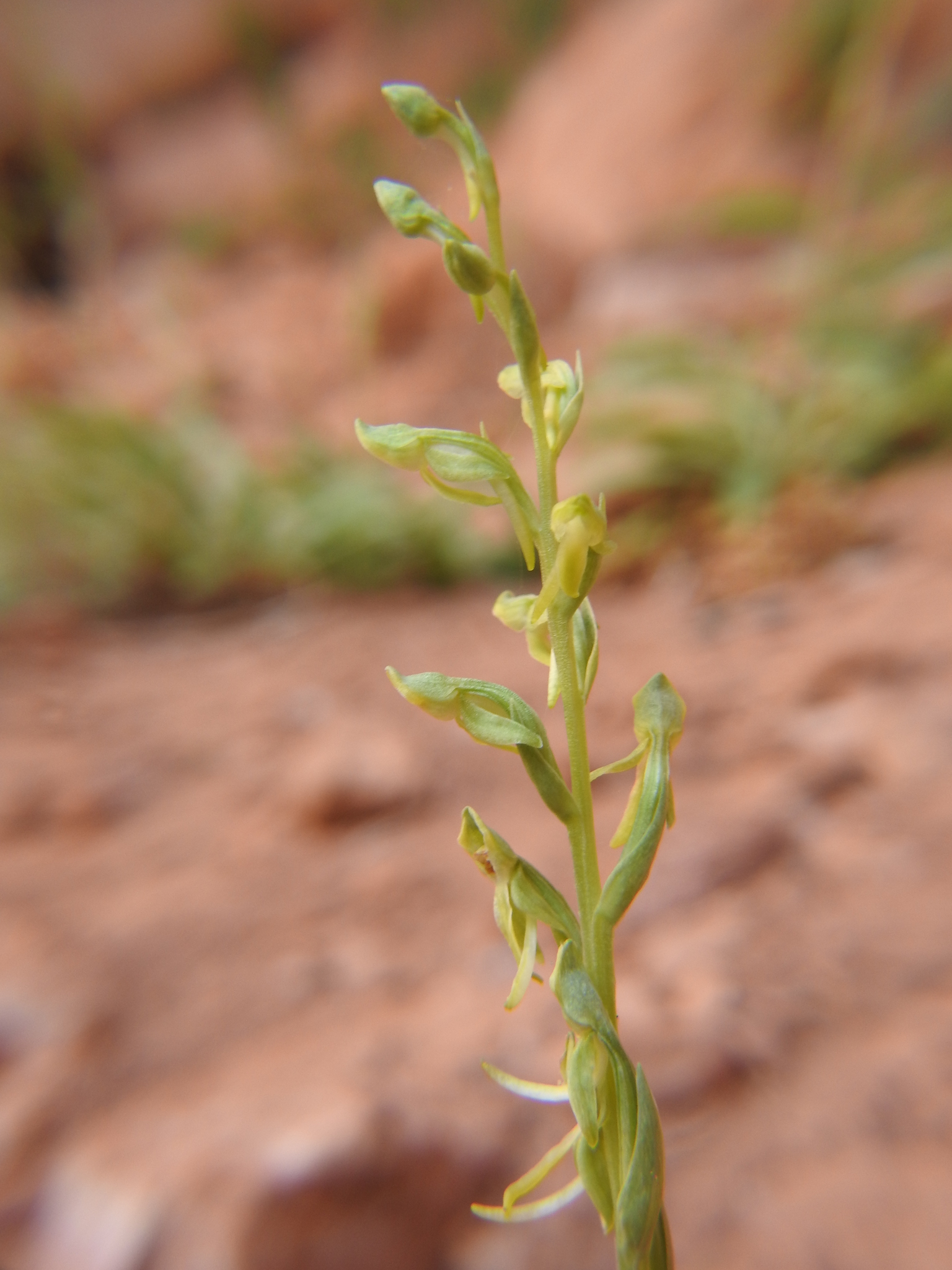

Conservation status
- Vulnerable (NatureServe)

Scientific classification
- Kingdom: Plantae
- Clade: Tracheophytes
- Clade: Angiosperms
- Clade: Monocots
- Order: Asparagales
- Family: Orchidaceae
- Subfamily: Orchidoideae
- Genus: Platanthera
- Species: P. zothecina

Binomial name
- Platanthera zothecina (L.C.Higgins & S.L.Welsh) Kartesz & Gandhi

Synonyms
- Habenaria zothecina; Limnorchis zothecina

= Platanthera zothecina =

North American species of orchid

Platanthera zothecina (synonym Habenaria zothecina, common name - alcove bog orchid) is a perennial plant in the orchid family (Orchidaceae) found in the Colorado Plateau and Canyonlands region of the southwestern United States and is found in the states of Utah, Arizona and Colorado.

== Habitat and range ==
It can be found in moist sites in seeps and hanging gardens.

== Description ==
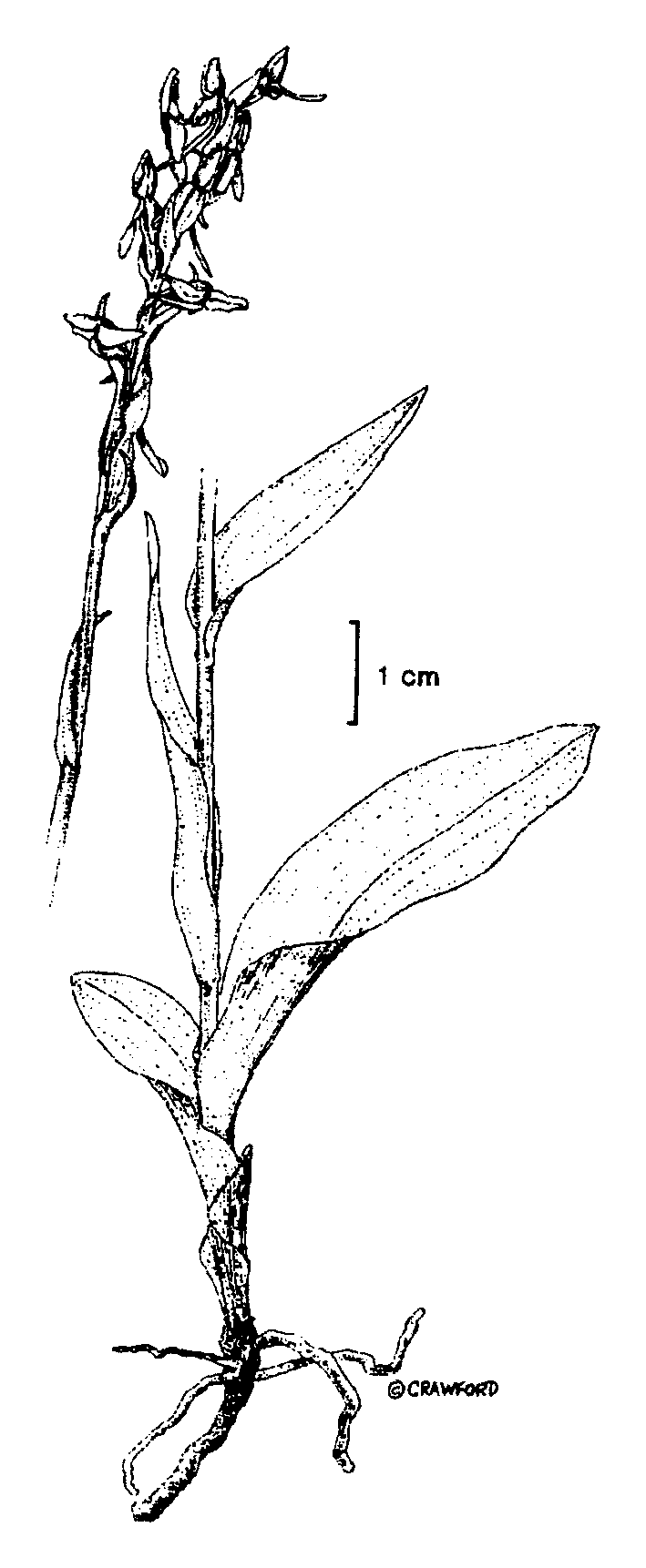
Platanthera zothecina

=== Growth pattern ===
It grows from 7 to 24 inches (18 to 61 cm) tall. Its overall green color makes it inconspicuous among other greenery in its habitats.

=== Leaves and stems ===
Leaves are long and narrowly linear to elliptic.

=== Inflorescence and fruit ===
It blooms from May to August.

Green or yellowish-green flowers are on stalk of 5-20, with upper sepals closely contacting the petals to form a hood over the style. The lateral (side) sepals are curved. Petals are triangular and lance-like. The lip is yellowish and linear.

== Taxonomy ==
Platanthera zothecina was scientificaly described by Larry C. Higgins and Stanley Larson Welsh in 1986 and named Habenaria zothecina. It was moved to the genus Platanthera by John T. Kartesz and Kanchi Natarajan Gandhi in 1990. Together with its genus it is classified in the family Orchidaceae. It has two homotypic synonyms.

Table of Synonyms
Name	Year
Habenaria zothecina L.C.Higgins & S.L.Welsh	1986
Limnorchis zothecina (L.C.Higgins & S.L.Welsh) W.A.Weber	1989
