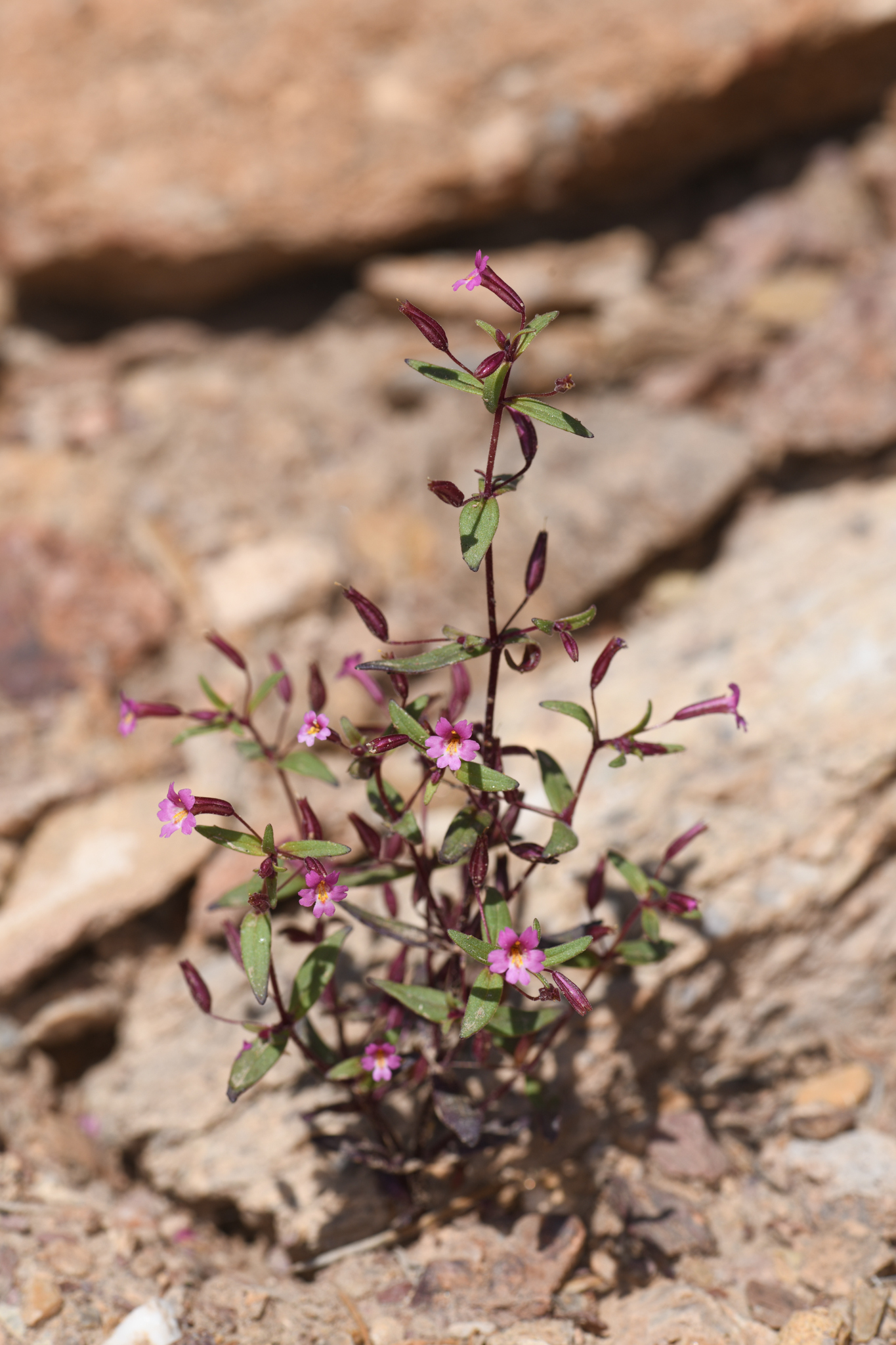
- Inyo County, California, 2023

Conservation status
- Secure (NatureServe)

Scientific classification
- Kingdom: Plantae
- Clade: Embryophytes
- Clade: Tracheophytes
- Clade: Angiosperms
- Clade: Eudicots
- Clade: Asterids
- Order: Lamiales
- Family: Phrymaceae
- Genus: Erythranthe
- Species: E. rubella

Binomial name
- Erythranthe rubella (A.Gray) N.S.Fraga

Synonyms
- Mimulus rubellus A.Gray; Mimulus gratioloides Rydb.

= Erythranthe rubella =

Plant species in the lopseed family

Erythranthe rubella is a species of monkeyflower known by the common name little redstem monkeyflower. It was formerly known as Mimulus rubellus.

== Taxonomy ==
Erythranthe rubella was scientifically described by Asa Gray in 1859 and given the name Mimulus rubellus. It was moved to the genus Erythranthe in 2012 by Naomi Fraga giving the species its accepted name. The species has no subspecies and has one other heterotypic synonym, Mimulus gratioloides, described and named by Per Axel Rydberg in 1901.

== Distribution ==
It is native to western North America, including the southwestern United States to Wyoming and Texas, and into Baja California and Sonora in northern Mexico.

== Description ==
Erythranthe rubellus is an annual herb growing 2 to 32 centimeters tall with a very slender, red stem. The oppositely arranged oval leaves are up to 3 centimeters long and lance-shaped to oval, the lower ones borne on short petioles. The herbage is usually lightly hairy and green to reddish in color.

The petite tubular flower is no more than a centimeter long, the base of its tube encapsulated in a narrow, ribbed calyx of sepals. The flower may be yellow or pink in color and the mouth of the flower is usually dotted with red or purple.
