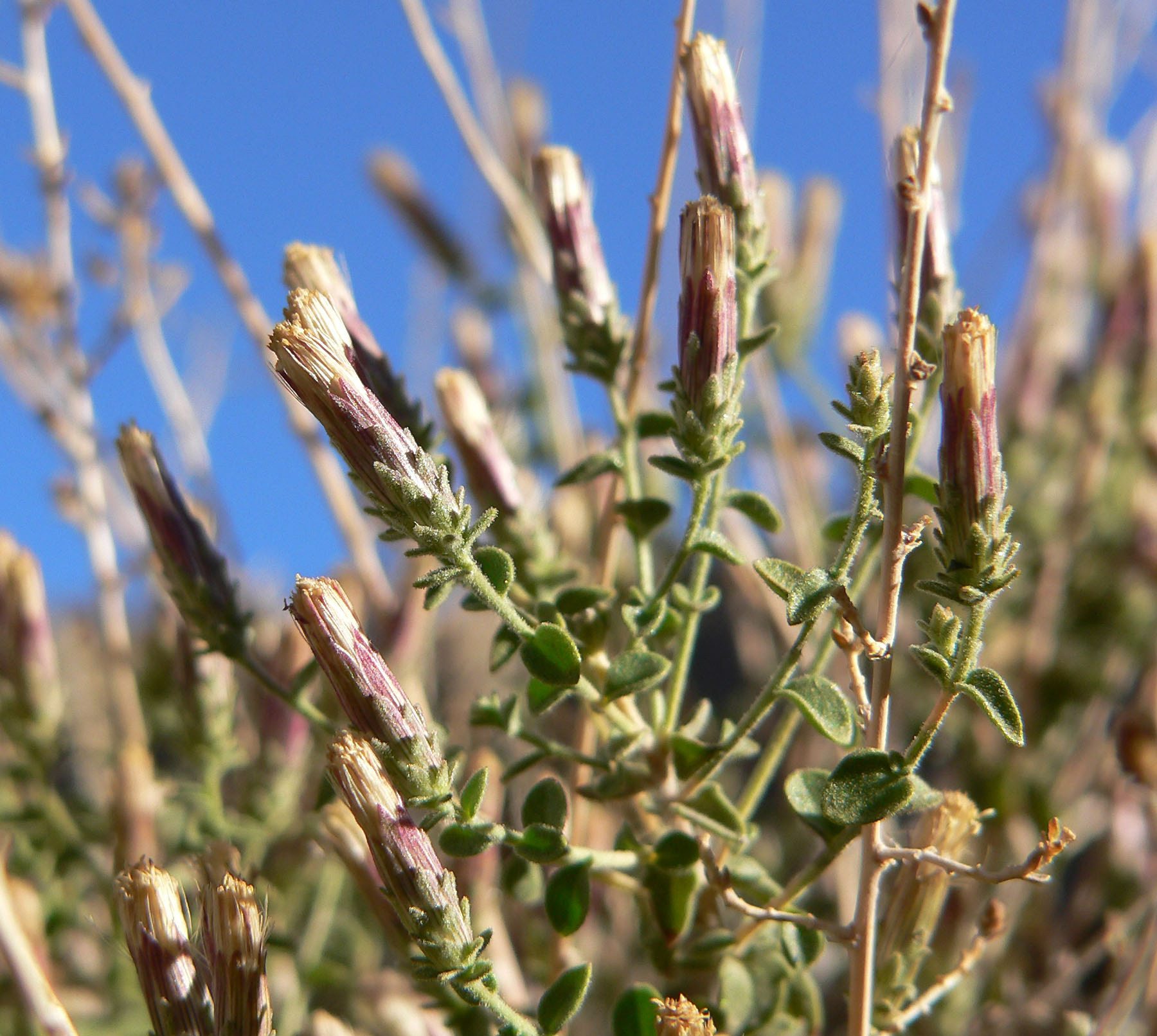
- var. microphylla in Nevada

Conservation status
- Secure (NatureServe)

Scientific classification
- Kingdom: Plantae
- Clade: Tracheophytes
- Clade: Angiosperms
- Clade: Eudicots
- Clade: Asterids
- Order: Asterales
- Family: Asteraceae
- Genus: Brickellia
- Species: B. microphylla

Binomial name
- Brickellia microphylla (Nutt.) A.Gray

Synonyms
- Brickellia cedrosensis Greene; Brickellia grayanae Hieron.; Coleosanthus cedrosensis (Greene) Greene; Coleosanthus microphyllus (Nutt.) Kuntze; Brickellia scabra (A.Gray) A.Nelson ex B.L.Rob., syn of var. scabra

= Brickellia microphylla =

Species of flowering plant

Brickellia microphylla, the littleleaf brickellbush, is a flowering plant species in the family Asteraceae native to western North America.

== Distribution and habitat ==
The plant is widespread across much of the Western United States and Northwestern Mexico. It is found from California and Baja California east to New Mexico and Colorado, and north to Washington, Idaho, and Wyoming.

Brickellia microphylla var. scabra has a more eastern and southern distribution in the species' range, and grades into Brickellia microphylla var. microphylla in southern and central Utah and eastern California.

== Description ==
Brickellia microphylla is a shrub 30 – −70 centimetres (12 – −28 in) in size.

It produces many small, pale yellow flower heads pale yellow, often purple-tinged. They are often clumped together at the ends of branches. The bloom period is July to October.

=== Varieties ===
Varieties, which can intergrade, include:

- Brickellia microphylla var. microphylla — Littleleaf brickellbush, native to California, Baja California (México), Arizona, Colorado, Idaho, Nevada, Oregon, Utah, Washington, and Wyoming.
- Brickellia microphylla var. scabra A.Gray — Rough brickellbush, native to southeastern California, Baja California, Arizona, Colorado, Nevada, New Mexico, Sonora (México), Utah, and Wyoming.
- Brickellia microphylla var. watsonii — Watson's brickellbush, native to southeastern California, Arizona, Nevada, Utah.
