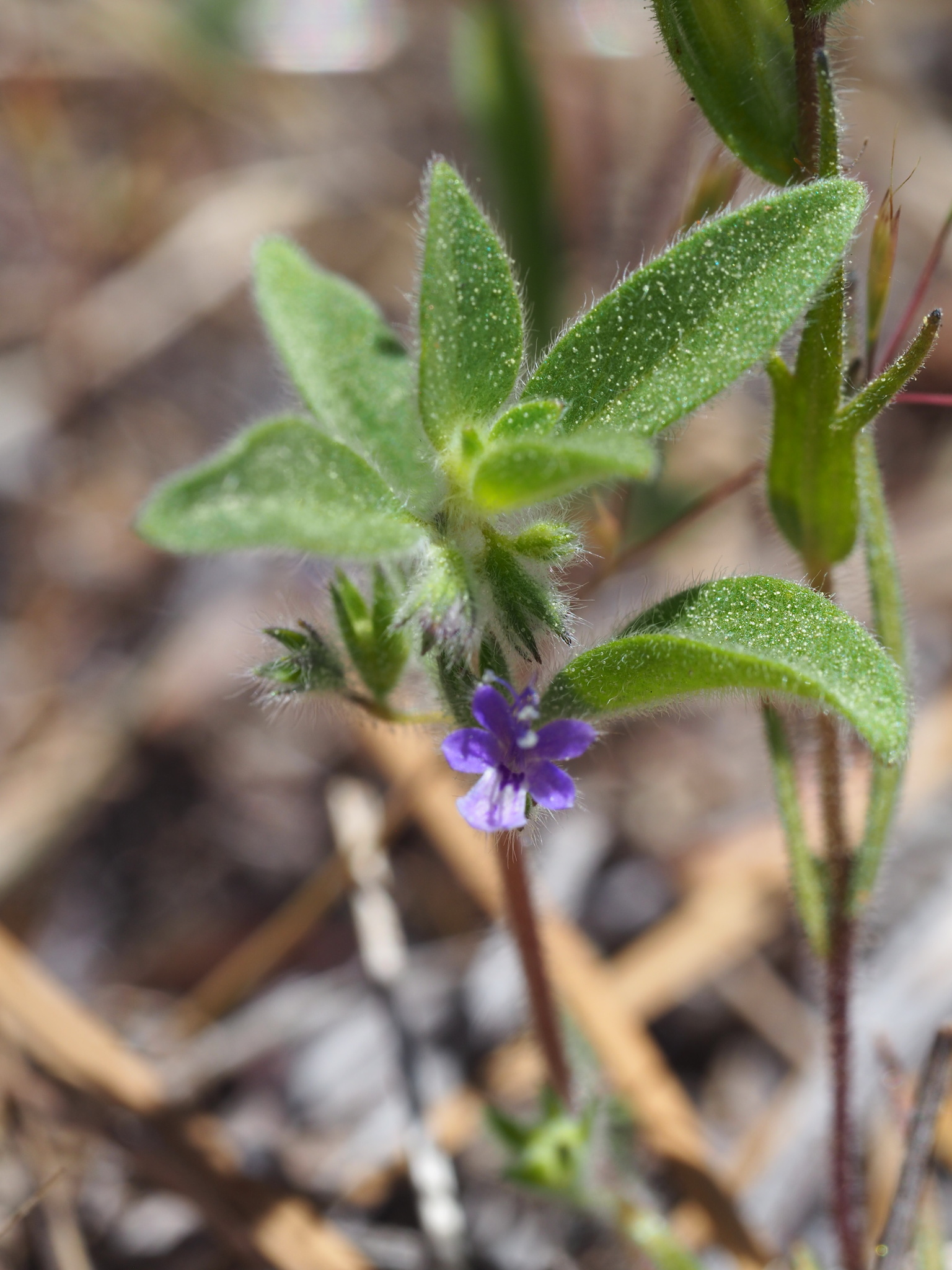

Conservation status
- Vulnerable (NatureServe)

Scientific classification
- Kingdom: Plantae
- Clade: Tracheophytes
- Clade: Angiosperms
- Clade: Eudicots
- Clade: Asterids
- Order: Lamiales
- Family: Lamiaceae
- Genus: Trichostema
- Species: T. austromontanum

Binomial name
- Trichostema austromontanum F.H.Lewis

= Trichostema austromontanum =

Species of flowering plant

Trichostema austromontanum is a species of flowering plant in the mint family known by the common name San Jacinto bluecurls. It is native to California from the mountains east of the Sierra Nevada to the Transverse Ranges and Peninsular Ranges, its distribution extending south into Baja California. It occurs in wet mountain meadows and on the shores of lakes. It is an annual herb approaching half a meter in maximum height, its aromatic herbage coated in glandular and nonglandular hairs. The elongated or lance-shaped leaves are 2 to 5 centimeters long. The inflorescence is a series of clusters of flowers located at each leaf pair. Each flower has a hairy calyx of pointed sepals and a tubular, lipped purple corolla. The four stamens are long and curved.

There are two subspecies. The rarer, ssp. compactum, the Hidden Lake bluecurls, is known only from one location at Hidden Lake, a small seasonal alpine lake in the San Jacinto Mountains of Riverside County, California. It is a federally listed threatened species of the United States. The main threat to its existence is trampling by hikers and sightseers.
