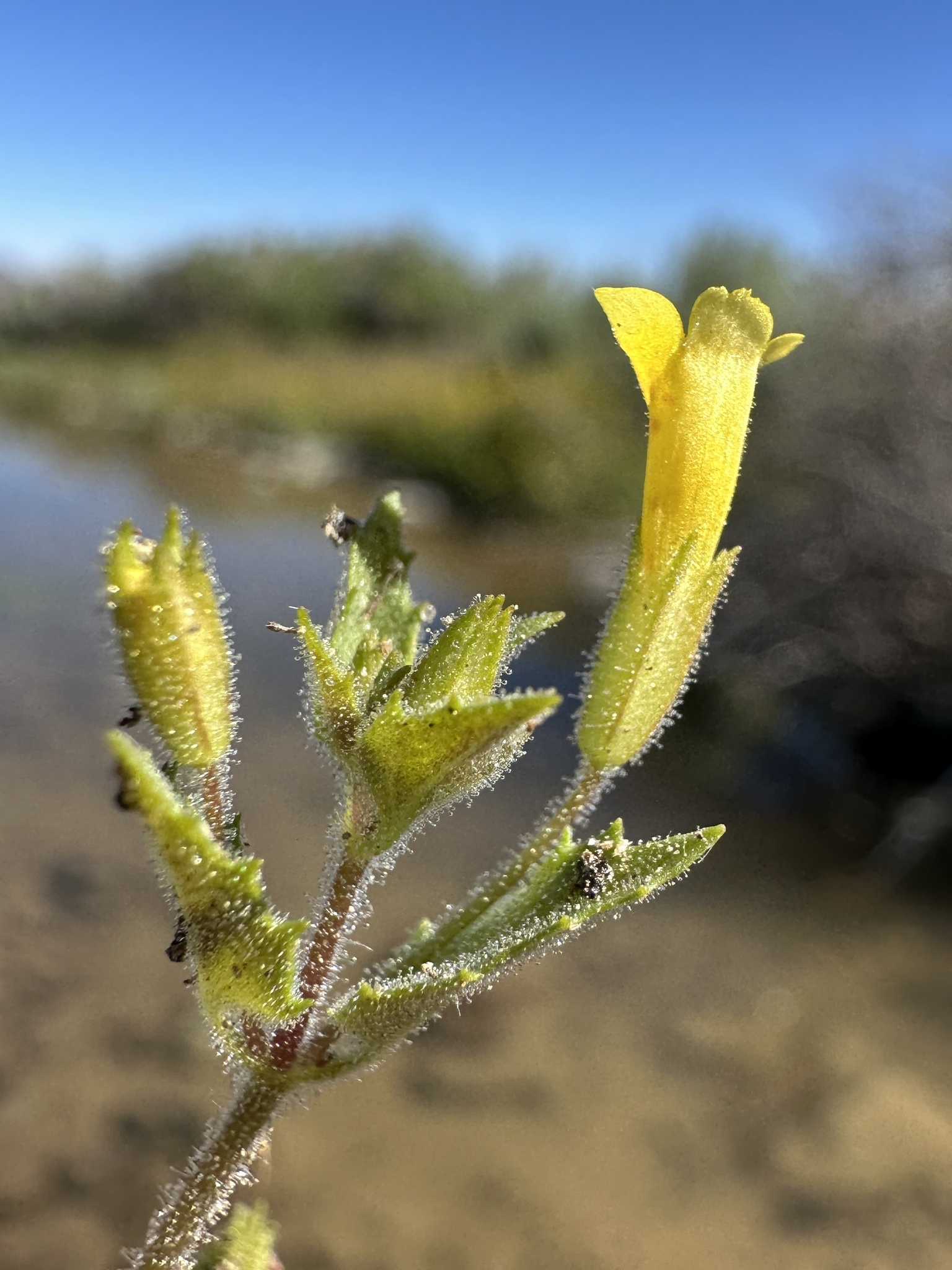
- Humboldt County, Nevada, 2023

Conservation status
- Least Concern (IUCN 3.1)

- Secure (NatureServe)

Scientific classification
- Kingdom: Plantae
- Clade: Embryophytes
- Clade: Tracheophytes
- Clade: Angiosperms
- Clade: Eudicots
- Clade: Asterids
- Order: Lamiales
- Family: Phrymaceae
- Genus: Erythranthe
- Species: E. floribunda

Binomial name
- Erythranthe floribunda (Douglas ex Lindl.) G.L.Nesom

Synonyms
- Capraria pusilla Torr.; Mimulus deltoideus Gand.; Mimulus floribundus Douglas ex Lindl.; Mimulus floribundus var. membranaceus (A.Nelson) A.L.Grant; Mimulus floribundus var. minor Hook.; Mimulus floribundus var. subulatus A.L.Grant; Mimulus membranaceus A.Nelson; Mimulus multiflorus Pennell; Mimulus peduncularis Douglas ex Benth.; Mimulus serotinus Suksd.; Mimulus subulatus (A.L.Grant) Pennell; Mimulus trisulcatus Pennell

= Erythranthe floribunda =

Plant species in the monkeyflower genus

Erythranthe floribunda is a species of monkeyflower known by the common name many-flowered monkeyflower. It is native to western North America from western Canada to California and northern Mexico, to the Rocky Mountains. It grows in many types of habitat, especially moist areas. It was formerly known as Mimulus floribundus.

== Description ==
This plant is variable in morphology, taking several forms. In general it is an annual herb with a thin stem 3 to 50 centimeters long, growing upright or decumbent. In texture it is hairy and sometimes slimy. The oppositely arranged leaves vary in size and shape. The tubular base of the flower is encapsulated in a hairy calyx of sepals with pointed lobes. The corolla of the flower is yellow and up to 1.5 centimeters long.

== Taxonomy ==
Erythranthe floribunda was scientifically described in 1828 by John Lindley and named Mimulus floribundus. In 2012 it was moved to the genus Erythranthe by Guy L. Nesom, giving the species its accepted name. According to Plants of the World Online it has 12 synonyms.

Table of Synonyms
Name	Year	Rank	Notes
Capraria pusilla Torr.	1824	species	= het.
Mimulus deltoideus Gand.	1919	species	= het.
Mimulus floribundus Lindl.	1828	species	≡ hom.
Mimulus floribundus var. membranaceus (A.Nelson) A.L.Grant	1924	variety	= het.
Mimulus floribundus var. minor Hook.	1838	variety	= het.
Mimulus floribundus var. subulatus A.L.Grant	1924	variety	= het.
Mimulus membranaceus A.Nelson	1903	species	= het.
Mimulus multiflorus Pennell	1947	species	= het.
Mimulus peduncularis Douglas ex Benth.	1835	species	= het.
Mimulus serotinus Suksd.	1900	species	= het.
Mimulus subulatus (A.L.Grant) Pennell	1947	species	= het.
Mimulus trisulcatus Pennell	1947	species	= het.
Notes: ≡ homotypic synonym; = heterotypic synonym
