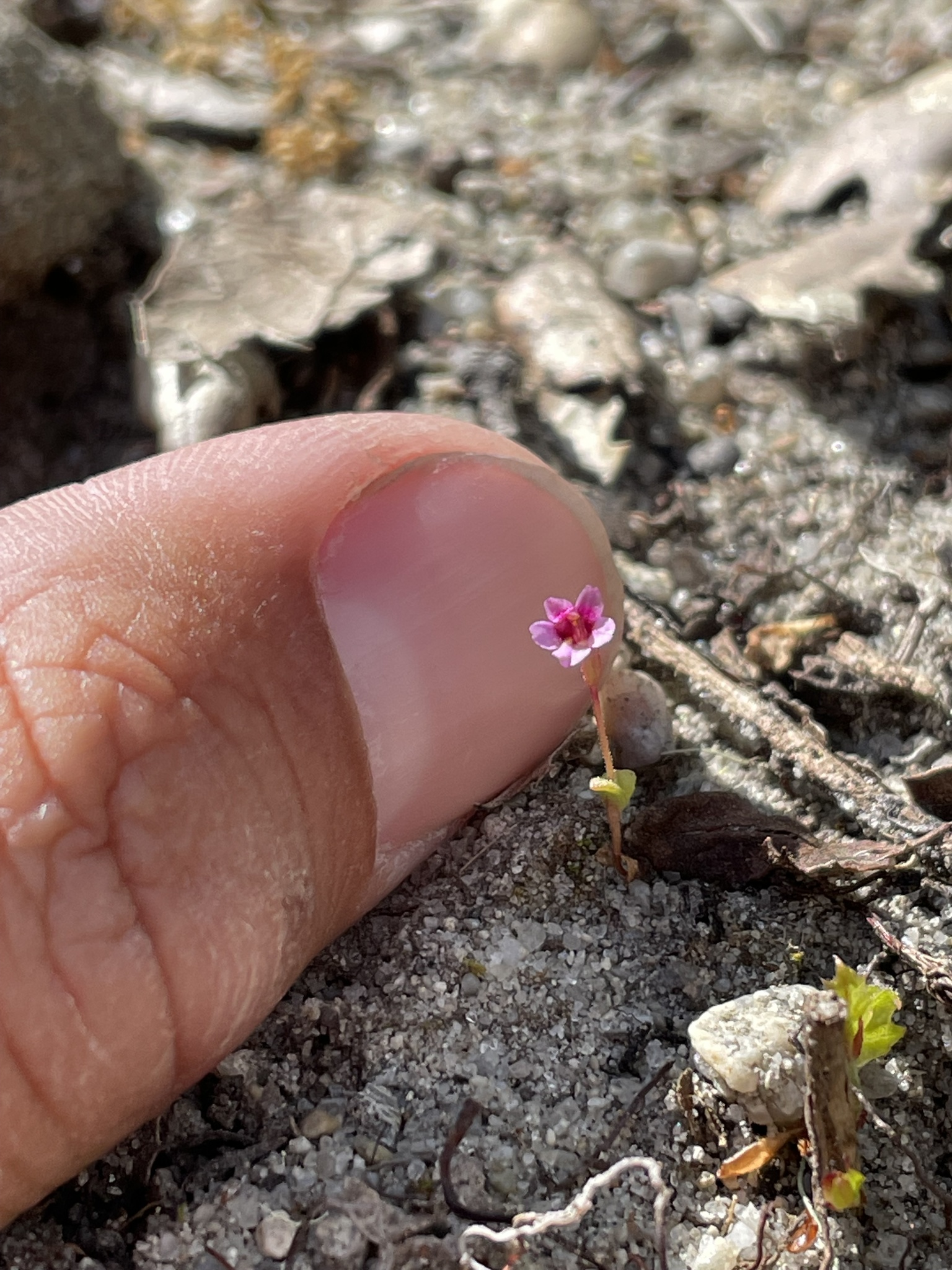
- Santa Cruz County, California, 2023

Conservation status
- Vulnerable (NatureServe)

Scientific classification
- Kingdom: Plantae
- Clade: Tracheophytes
- Clade: Angiosperms
- Clade: Eudicots
- Clade: Asterids
- Order: Lamiales
- Family: Phrymaceae
- Genus: Erythranthe
- Species: E. androsacea

Binomial name
- Erythranthe androsacea (Curran ex Greene) N.S.Fraga

Synonyms
- Mimulus androsaceus Curran ex Greene; Mimulus palmeri var. androsaceus (Curran ex Greene) A.Gray

= Erythranthe androsacea =

Species of flowering plant

Erythranthe androsacea is a species of monkeyflower known by the common name rockjasmine monkeyflower. It was formerly known as Mimulus androsaceus.

== Distribution ==
It is endemic to California, where its distribution spans between the Coast Ranges north of the San Francisco Bay Area to the Mojave Desert, and the Transverse Ranges and Peninsular Ranges.

It grows in moist or wet areas in many types of habitat.

== Description ==
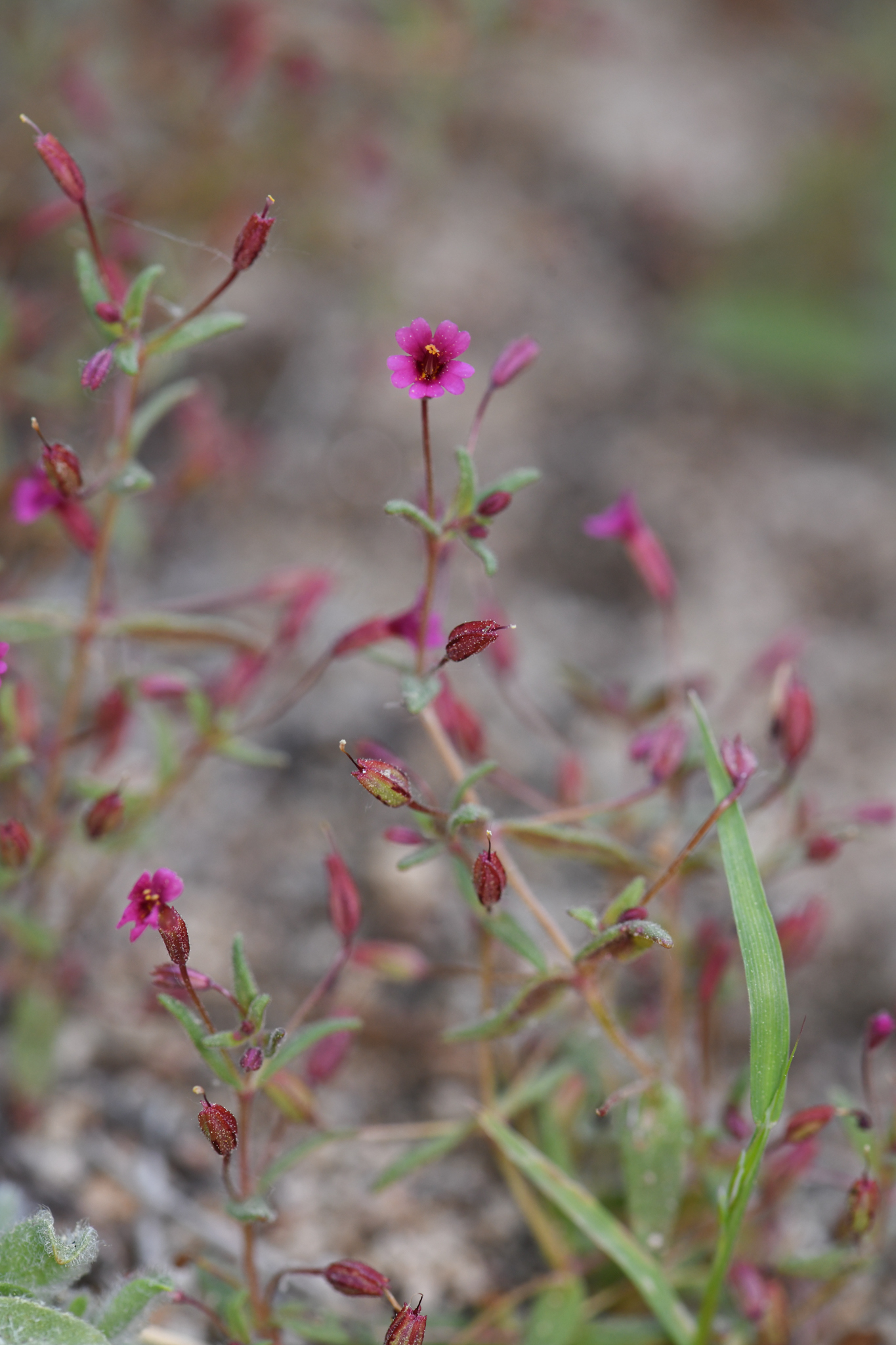
Rockjasmine monkeyflower in Tulare, California, June 2023

Erythranthe androsacea is a petite annual herb producing a hair-thin, erect stem just a few centimeters tall. Its herbage is mostly red to greenish in color, the paired tiny leaves sheathing the stem at midpoint. The tubular base of the flower is surrounded by a slightly hairy red calyx of sepals. The flower corolla is pink to reddish-purple with darker spots in the throat, and just a few millimeters long.
