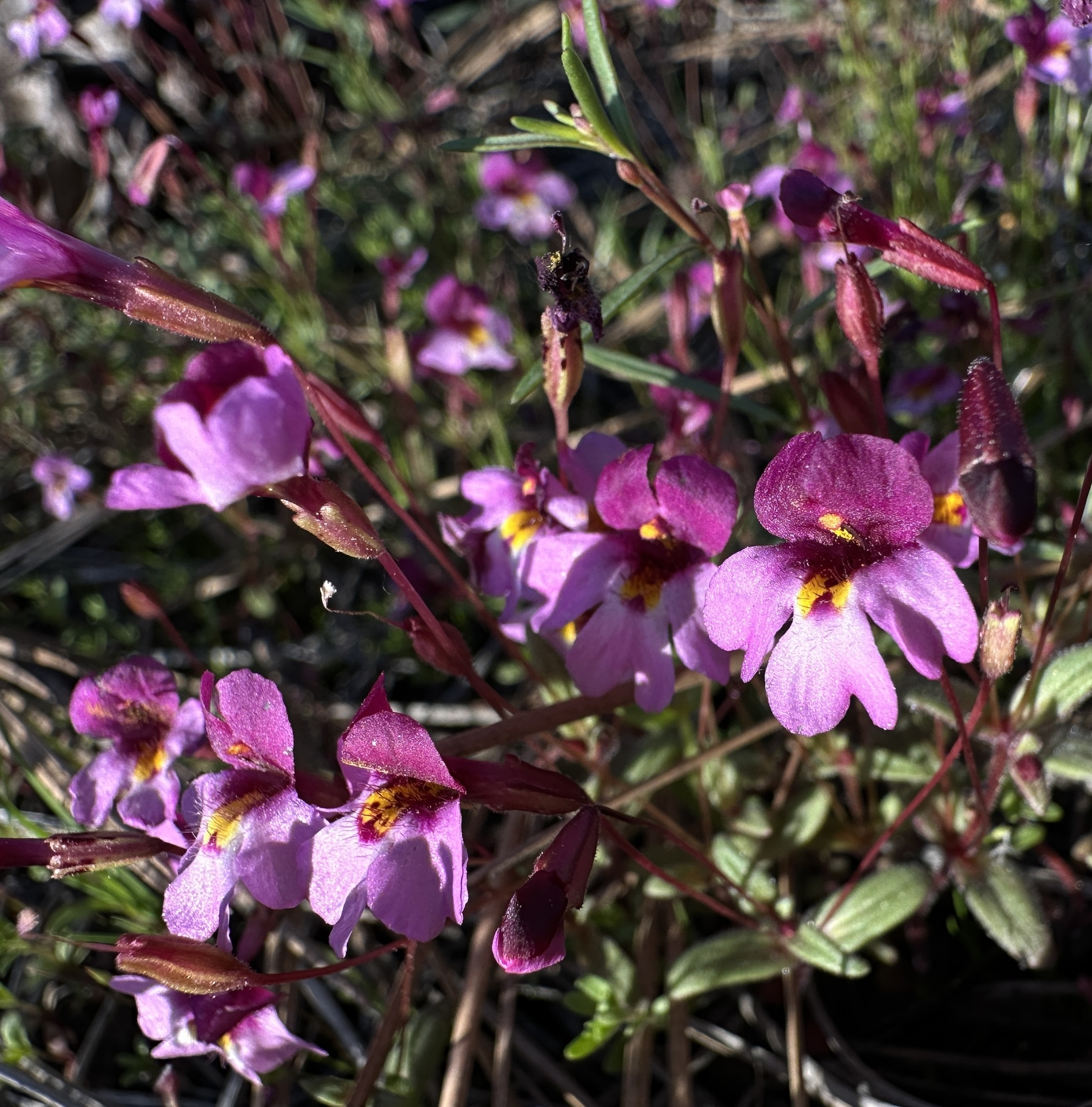
- San Bernardino County, California, 2023

Conservation status
- Imperiled (NatureServe)

Scientific classification
- Kingdom: Plantae
- Clade: Embryophytes
- Clade: Tracheophytes
- Clade: Angiosperms
- Clade: Eudicots
- Clade: Asterids
- Order: Lamiales
- Family: Phrymaceae
- Genus: Erythranthe
- Species: E. purpurea

Binomial name
- Erythranthe purpurea (A.L.Grant) N.S.Fraga

Synonyms
- Mimulus purpureus A.L.Grant, nom. illeg. homonym. post.; Mimulus purpureus var. pauxillus A.L.Grant

= Erythranthe purpurea =

Species of flowering plant

Erythranthe purpurea is a species of monkeyflower known by the common name little purple monkeyflower. It was formerly known as Mimulus purpureus.

== Distribution ==
It is native to southern California and northern Baja California. It is known from only about 20 occurrences in the Big Bear Lake area of the San Bernardino Mountains in Southern California, and it is also known from the Sierra de Juarez in northern Baja California. It grows in moist habitat in mountain meadows, including the quartz pebble plain habitat type.

== Description ==
Erythranthe purpurea is a petite annual herb growing just a few centimeters tall. The oppositely arranged oval leaves are under 2 centimeters long each. Each flower is borne on a very thin, erect pedicel which may be several centimeters tall.

The tubular base of the flower is encapsulated in a reddish ribbed calyx of sepals with tiny pointed lobes. The flower is roughly a centimeter long with a wide mouth divided into an upper and lower lip. The flower is pink, the upper lip usually a darker shade than the lower, and there are yellow stripes or streaks in the mouth.
