= Naomi Fraga =

American botanist

- Born: 1979 (age 46–47)
- Education: Claremont Graduate University; California State Polytechnic University, Pomona
- Scientific career
- Workplaces: California Botanic Garden
- Thesis: Diversity, endemism and conservation of California Monkeyflowers (Phrymaceae): a case study in Erythranthe section Paradantha (2015)

Naomi Suzanne Fraga (born 1979) is an American botanist who is the Director of Conservation at the California Botanic Garden and research assistant professor of botany at Claremont Graduate University. She has focused her career on the conservation, monitoring and habitat restoration of rare plants across California. She was awarded the 2021 Center for Biological Diversity E.O. Wilson Award for Outstanding Science in Biodiversity Conservation. In 2023, Fraga received the Peter Raven Award from the American Society of Plant Taxonomists. This award is given annually to a plant systematist who has made exceptional efforts at outreach to non-scientists.

== Early life and education ==
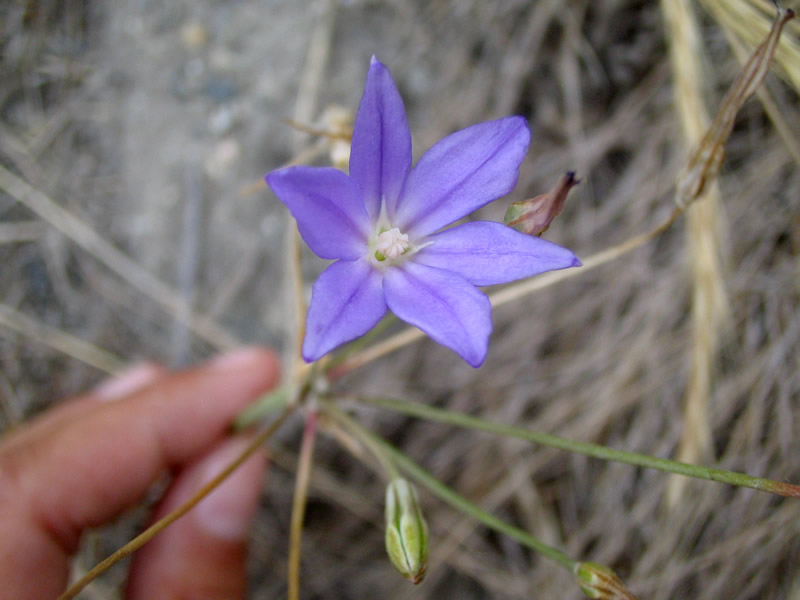
Brodiaea filifolia, photo by Naomi Fraga

Fraga grew up in California. She was an undergraduate student at California State Polytechnic University, Pomona where she studied biology and botany. In 2002 she wrote a senior thesis on A Short Flora of Short Canyon, Kern County, California.

Starting from 2001 she worked as a volunteer at the herbarium of the California Botanic Garden — then named "Rancho Santa Ana Botanic Garden (RSABG)" — in Claremont, California.

She undertook her master studies in botany at the Claremont Graduate University, finishing in 2005 with a thesis on A Vascular Flora of the Owens Peak Eastern Watershed, southern Sierra, Kern County, California.

In 2015 she earned her Ph.D. with a dissertation on Phrymaceae, California Monkeyflowers.

== Research and career ==
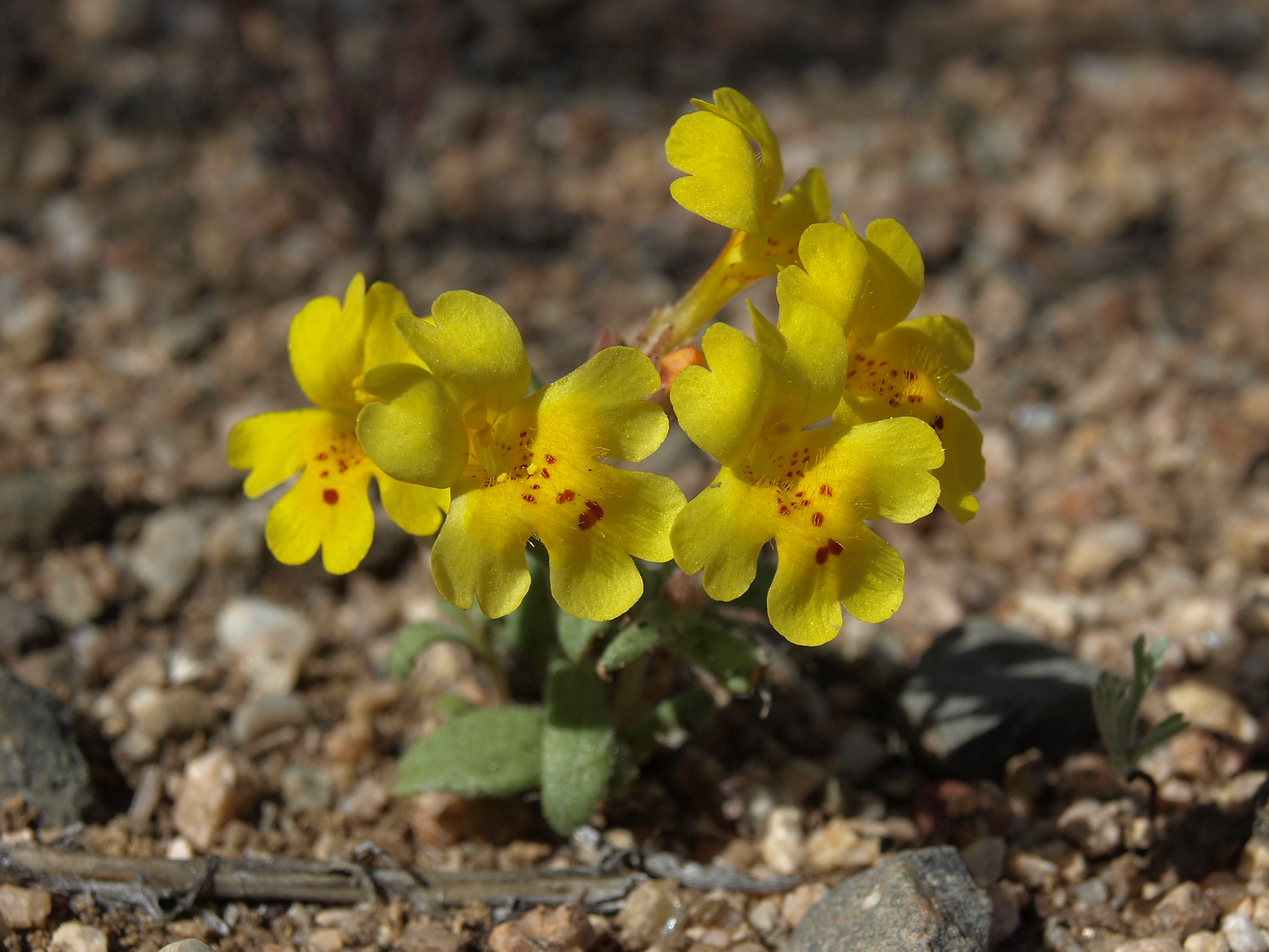
Carson Valley monkeyflower, Erythranthe carsonensis, recognized as a distinct species by Naomi Fraga in 2012, after having been confused with Erythranthe (=Mimulus) montioides since its discovery in the mid 1800s.

Fraga works as a research assistant professor at Claremont Graduate University. She is responsible for the California Seed Bank which homes billions of seeds and the world's largest collection of native plant seeds from California.

Fraga campaigned to protect Tiehm's buckwheat (Eriogonum tiehmii), which was treated by the proposed construction of a lithium mine. Tiehm's buckwheat has suffered in the changing climate of California, particularly with the diminished rainfall, excess temperatures and reduction in groundwater. When Tiehm's buckwheat becomes stressed the plants that sprout do not produce viable seeds. She also monitors and maintains the Amargosa niterwort (Nitrophila mohavensis) and contributed to the recovery of the Hidden Lake bluecurls (Trichostema austromontanum subsp. compactum).

The standard author abbreviation N.S.Fraga is used to indicate this person as the author when citing a botanical name.

== Awards and honors ==
- 2019 United States Fish and Wildlife Service Recovery Champion award
- 2021 Center for Plant Conservation's Star Award
- 2021 Center for Biological Diversity E.O. Wilson Award
- 2023 American Society of Plant Taxonomists' Peter Raven Award

== Selected publications ==
- Barker, W. R.; Nesom, G. L.; Beardsley, P. M.; Fraga, N.S. (2012). "A taxonomic conspectus of Phrymaceae: a narrowed circumscription for Mimulus, new and resurrected genera, and new names and combinations" (PDF). Phytoneuron. 39: 1–60. ISSN 2153-733X. Wikidata Q107484475.
- Fraga, Naomi S (2015). Diversity, endemism and conservation of California Monkeyflowers (Phrymaceae): a case study in Erythranthe section Paradantha (Thesis). OCLC 1321257557.
- Fraga, Naomi S.; La Doux, Tasha; Prince, Linda; Harding, Mitzi; Hoines, Josh (2015). Conservation assessment for triple-ribbed milkvetch (Astragalus tricarinatus, Fabaceae) in Joshua Tree National Park (PDF). Natural Resource Report NPS/JOTR/NRR—2015/999. Fort Collins, Colorado: National Park Service. OCLC 1240435673.
- Sophie S. Parker; Gregory B. Pauly; James Moore; et al. (15 May 2018). "Adapting the bioblitz to meet conservation needs". Conservation Biology. 32 (5): 1007–1019. doi:10.1111/cobi.13103. ISSN 0888-8892. PMID 29493001. Wikidata Q52680168.
- Sophie S. Parker; Andy Zdon; William T. Christian; et al. (5 December 2020). "Conservation of Mojave Desert springs and associated biota: status, threats, and policy opportunities". Biodiversity and Conservation. 30 (2): 311–327. doi:10.1007/s10531-020-02090-7. ISSN 0960-3115. Wikidata Q110029531.
