= Eriogonum twisselmanii =

Scientific classification
- Kingdom: Plantae
- Clade: Tracheophytes
- Clade: Angiosperms
- Clade: Eudicots
- Order: Caryophyllales
- Family: Polygonaceae
- Genus: Eriogonum
- Species: E. twisselmanii

Binomial name
- Eriogonum twisselmanii (J.T.Howell) Reveal

Synonyms
- Eriogonum douglasii var. twisselmannii J.T.Howell

Species of flowering plant

Eriogonum twisselmanii, Twisselmann's buckwheat, is a species of flowering plant native the United States.
