= E. roseum =

E. roseum may refer to:

- Epilobium roseum, a plant species in the genus Epilobium
- Eriogonum roseum, the wand buckwheat, a wild buckwheat species
