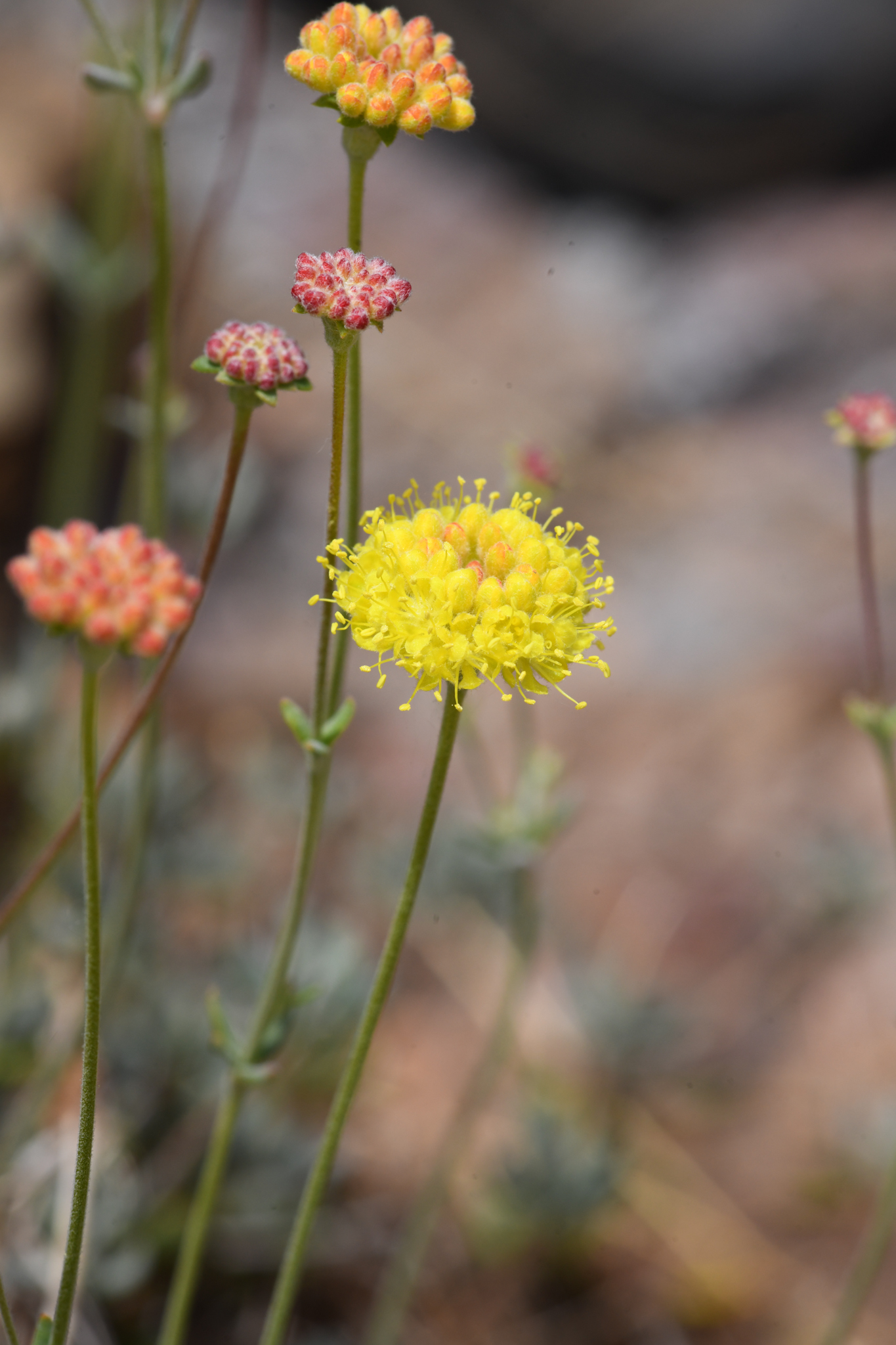

Scientific classification
- Kingdom: Plantae
- Clade: Tracheophytes
- Clade: Angiosperms
- Clade: Eudicots
- Order: Caryophyllales
- Family: Polygonaceae
- Genus: Eriogonum
- Species: E. tripodum

Binomial name
- Eriogonum tripodum Greene

= Eriogonum tripodum =

Species of wild buckwheat

Eriogonum tripodum is a rare species of wild buckwheat known by the common name tripod duckwheat. It is endemic to California, where it is known from the Sierra Nevada foothills and northern sections of the Coast Ranges.

== Description ==
Eriogonum tripodum is generally part of the serpentine soils flora. This is a spreading subshrub growing up to about half a meter tall and wide with mostly hairless flowering stems arising from a caudex. The base of the plant is covered in clusters of widely lance-shaped leaves which are woolly in texture, especially on the undersides.

The inflorescence atop the stem is a head or umbel of bright yellow flowers, each of which is hairy and connected to the cluster by a very narrow base like a stalk.
