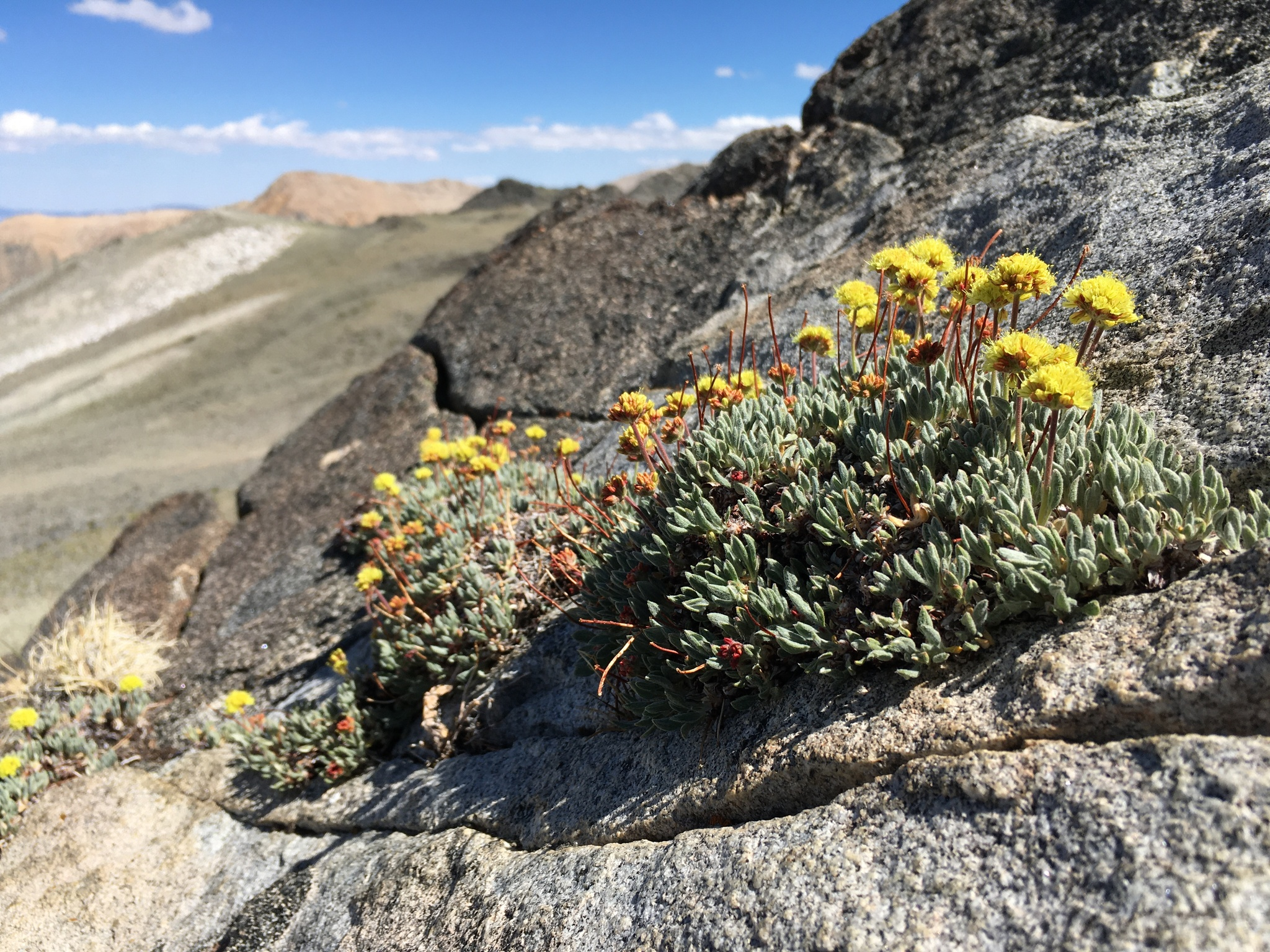

Scientific classification
- Kingdom: Plantae
- Clade: Tracheophytes
- Clade: Angiosperms
- Clade: Eudicots
- Order: Caryophyllales
- Family: Polygonaceae
- Genus: Eriogonum
- Species: E. rosense

Binomial name
- Eriogonum rosense A. Nelson & Kennedy

= Eriogonum rosense =

Species of wild buckwheat

Eriogonum rosense is a species of wild buckwheat known by the common name rosy buckwheat. It is native to the mountains of eastern California and its range extends into Nevada.

== Description ==
This is a small perennial herb which forms mats up to about 20 centimeters wide on dry, rocky mountain slopes. It produces clumps of glandular, coarsely woolly leaves, each about a centimeter long and erects inflorescences on naked, woolly stalks. The flower clusters are generally rounded and the flowers are bright yellow to red-streaked orange.
