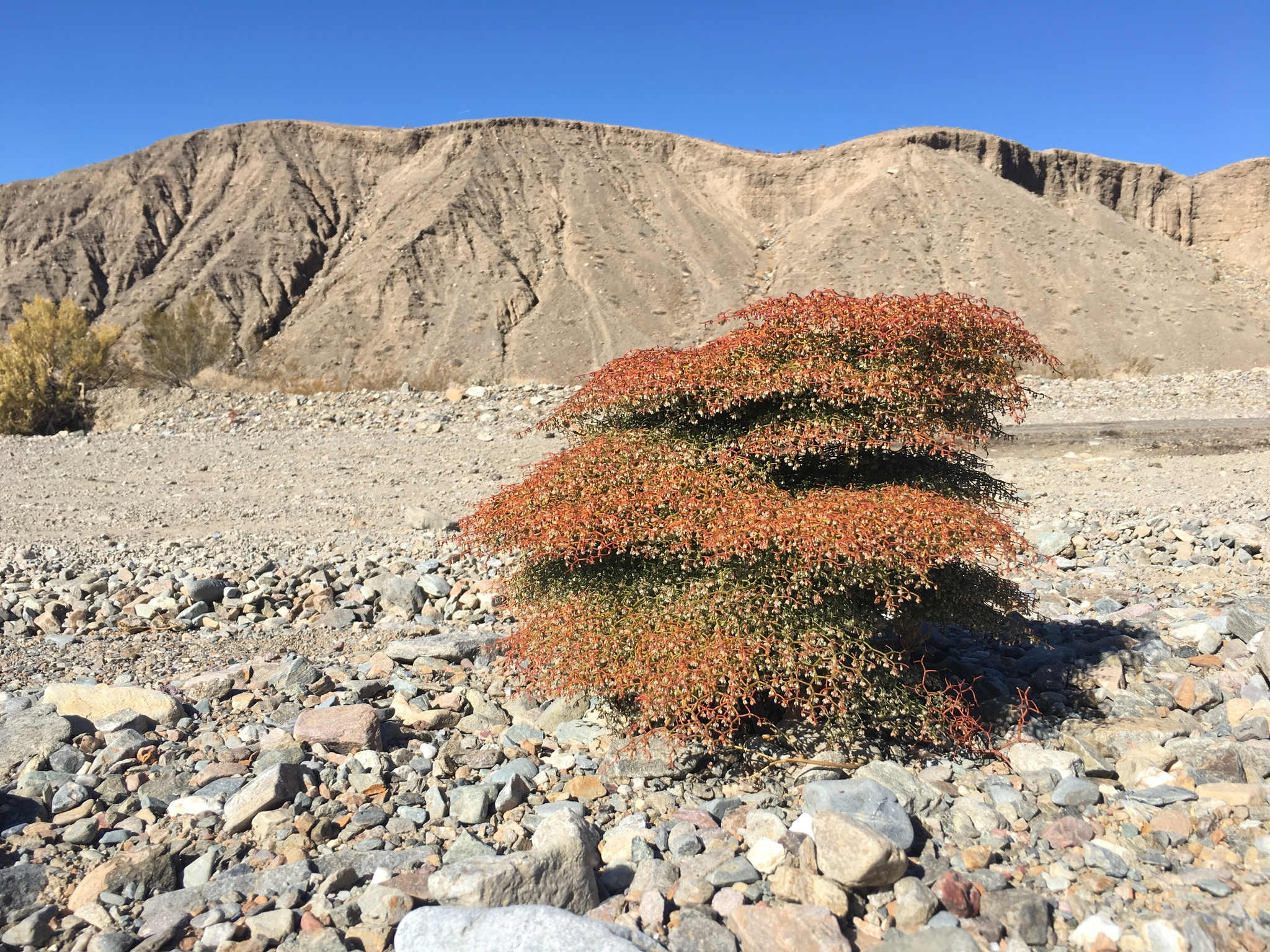

Conservation status
- Imperiled (NatureServe)

Scientific classification
- Kingdom: Plantae
- Clade: Tracheophytes
- Clade: Angiosperms
- Clade: Eudicots
- Order: Caryophyllales
- Family: Polygonaceae
- Genus: Eriogonum
- Species: E. rixfordii

Binomial name
- Eriogonum rixfordii S.Stokes

= Eriogonum rixfordii =

Species of wild buckwheat

Eriogonum rixfordii is an uncommon species of wild buckwheat known by the common name pagoda buckwheat. It is native to the Mojave Desert, where it grows in California's Death Valley and adjacent parts of Nevada.

== Description ==
This is an annual herb growing up to 40 centimeters tall. It is shaped like a pagoda, with a narrow base of stems spreading out into a wider inflorescence, which is a multilayered array of slender branches. The branches are lined with tiny bell-shaped clusters of minute white to reddish flowers.

One threat to the survival of the interesting-looking plant is collectors who pick it and take it home.
