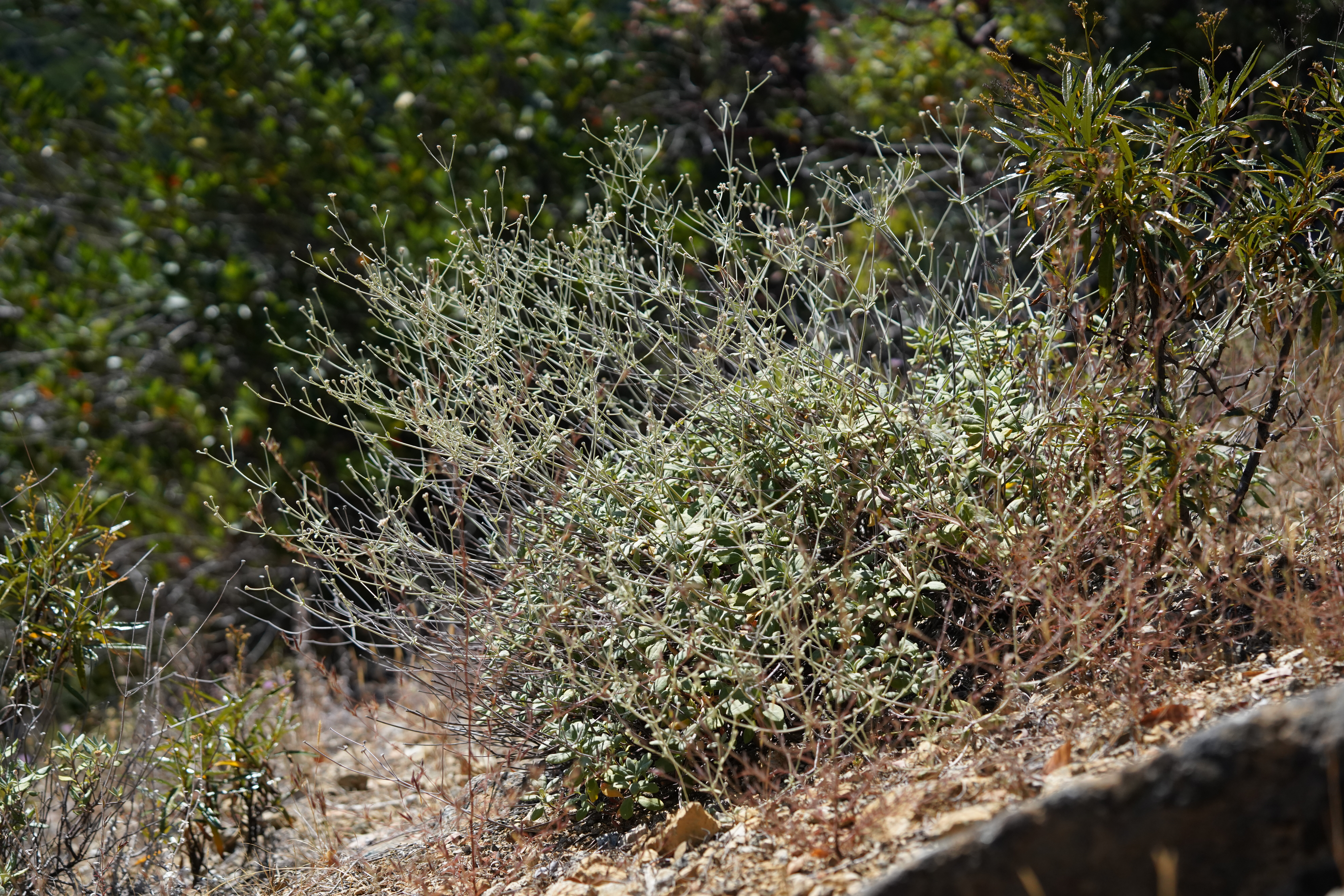

Scientific classification
- Kingdom: Plantae
- Clade: Embryophytes
- Clade: Tracheophytes
- Clade: Spermatophytes
- Clade: Angiosperms
- Clade: Eudicots
- Order: Caryophyllales
- Family: Polygonaceae
- Genus: Eriogonum
- Species: E. pendulum

Binomial name
- Eriogonum pendulum S.Wats.

= Eriogonum pendulum =

Species of wild buckwheat

Eriogonum pendulum is a rare species of wild buckwheat known by the common name Waldo buckwheat. It is endemic to the Klamath Mountains of Josephine County, Oregon, and Del Norte County, California, where it is a member of the serpentine soils flora.

== Description ==
This uncommon plant is a small shrub growing up to about half a meter tall with slender, spreading, woolly branches. There are sparse leaves along the stem, usually found in clusters at the tips and branching points. The leaves are widely lance-shaped and coated in white woolly fibers.

The top of the stem is occupied by the branching inflorescence which bears clusters of very woolly, star-shaped white flowers each under a centimeter wide.

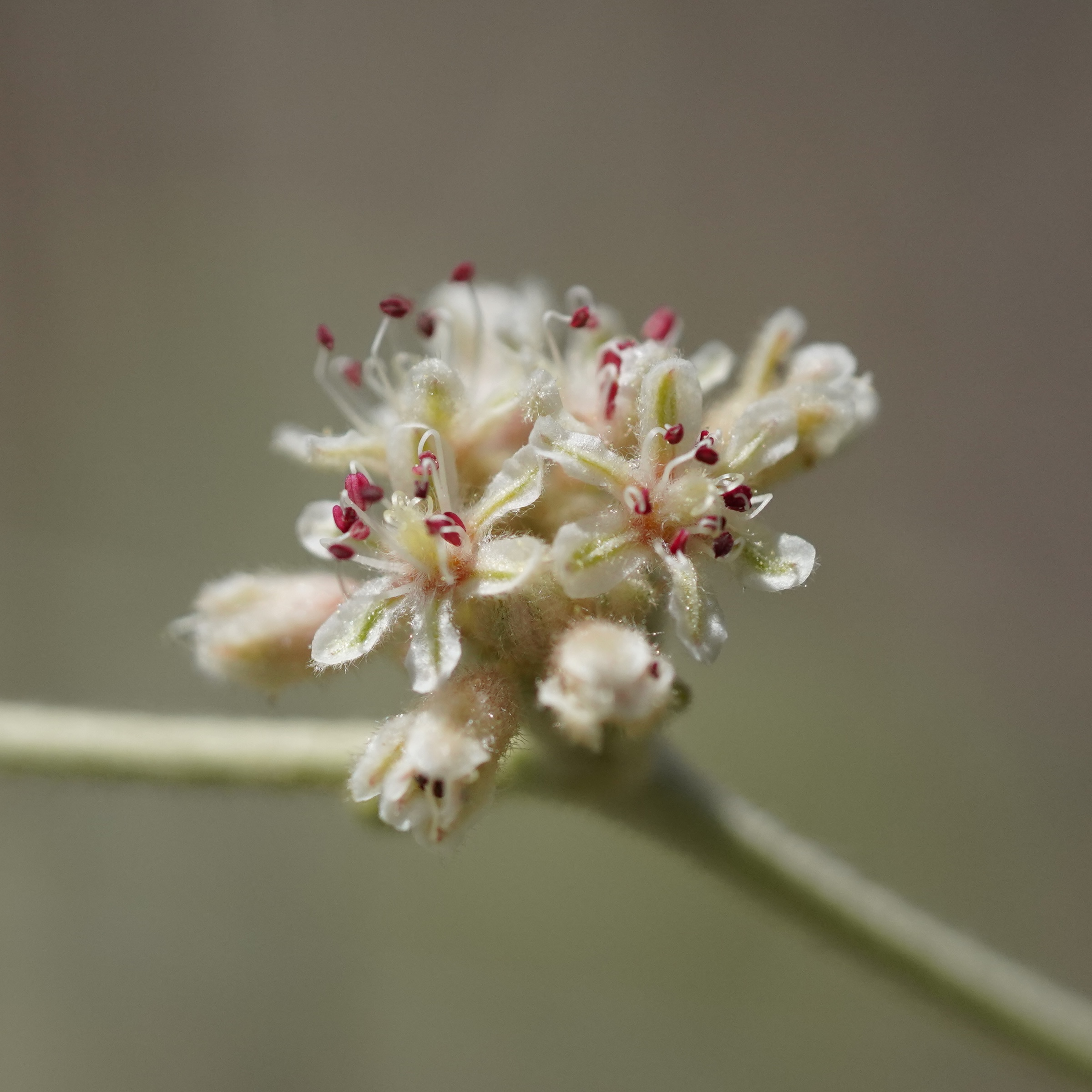
a cluster of flowers in bloom

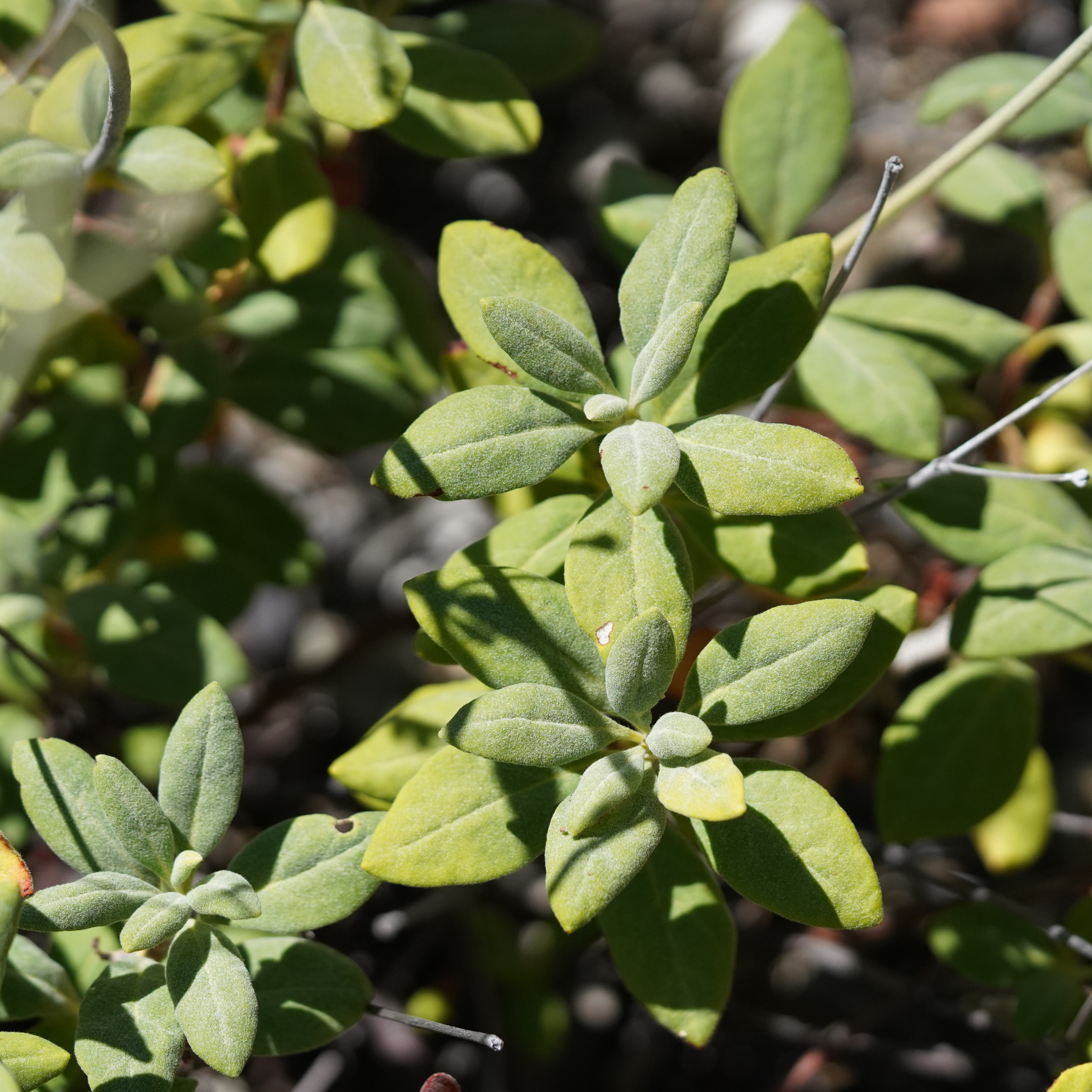
upper faces of leaves

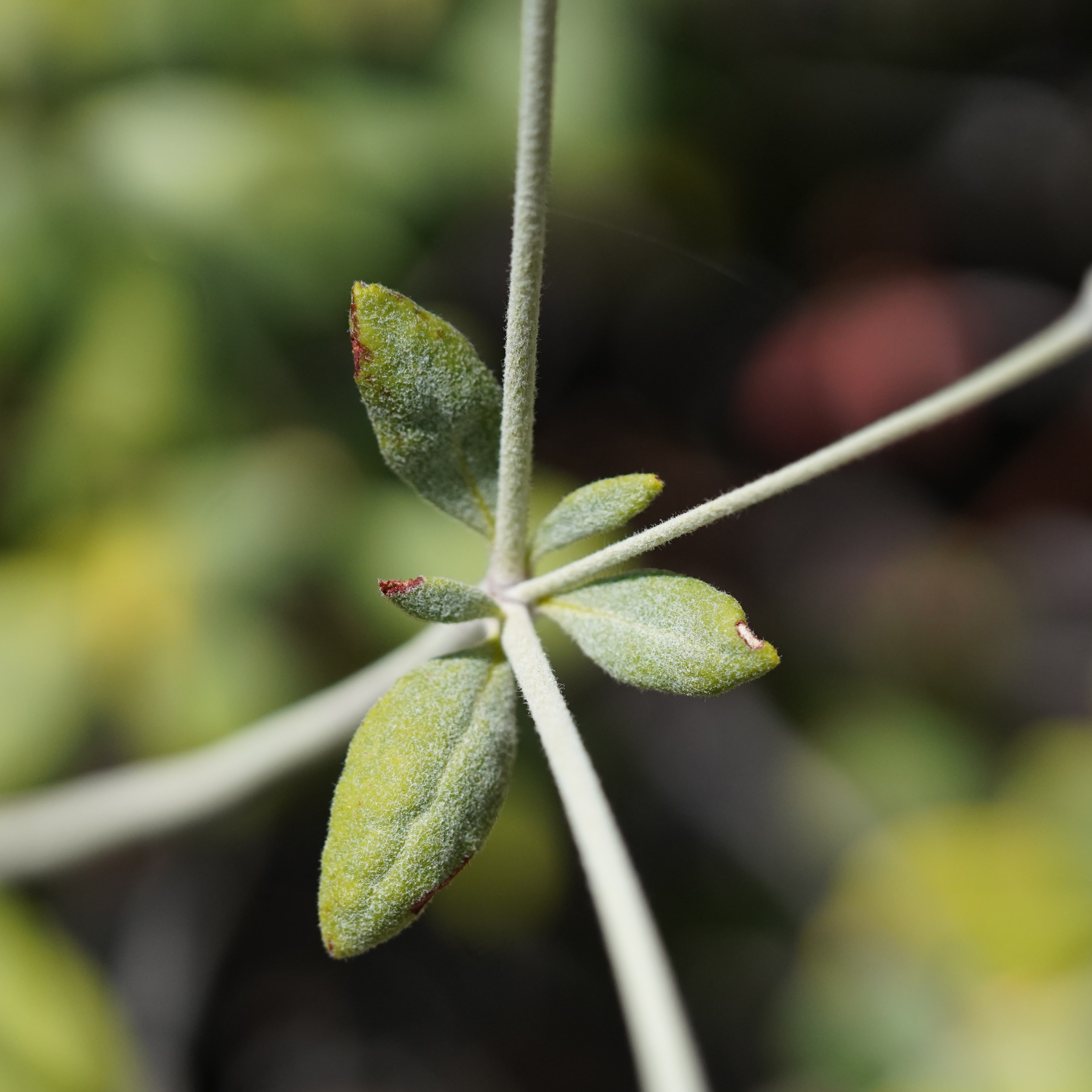
cauline leaves at a node
