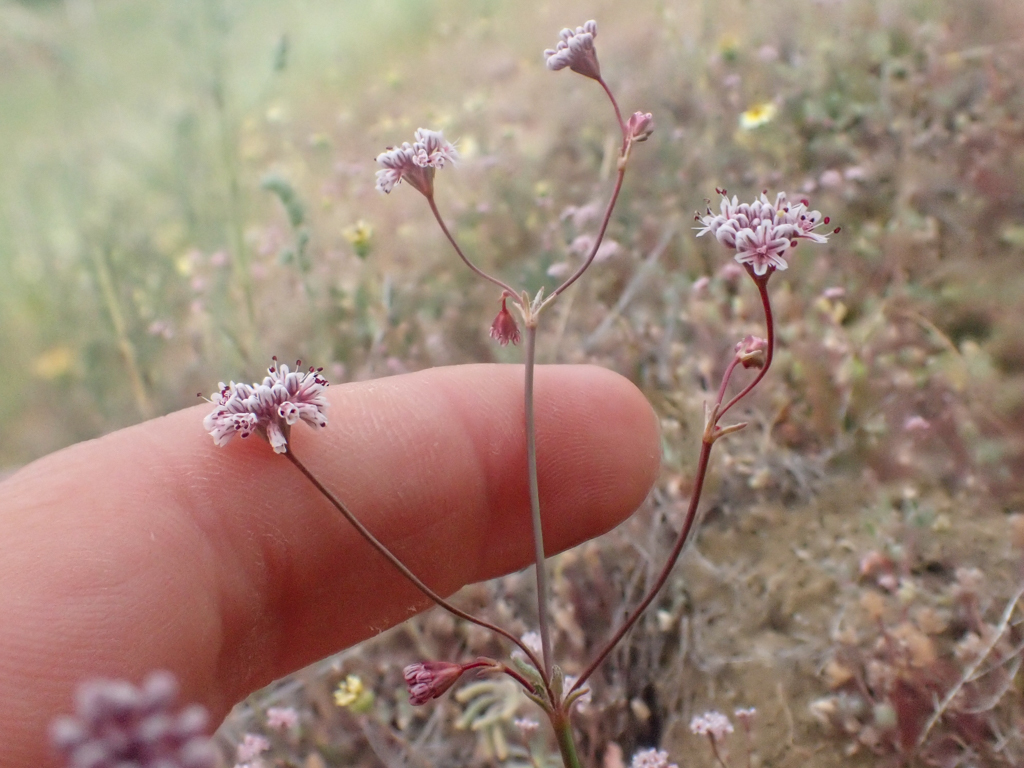
- In Diablo Range, San Benito County, California

Conservation status
- Vulnerable (NatureServe)

Scientific classification
- Kingdom: Plantae
- Clade: Embryophytes
- Clade: Tracheophytes
- Clade: Angiosperms
- Clade: Eudicots
- Order: Caryophyllales
- Family: Polygonaceae
- Genus: Eriogonum
- Species: E. argillosum

Binomial name
- Eriogonum argillosum J.T.Howell

= Eriogonum argillosum =

Species of wild buckwheat

Eriogonum argillosum is a species of wild buckwheat known by the common names clay buckwheat, clay-loving buckwheat, and Coast Range wild buckwheat. It is endemic to California, where it is known only from San Benito and Monterey Counties. It grows on clay substrates, often of serpentine origin. This is an annual herb up to 30 to 60 centimeters tall with a basal patch of oval-shaped, woolly leaves and a naked stem. The top of the stem is occupied by the inflorescence, a cyme with several clusters of tiny white or pink flowers.

== Taxonomy ==
Eriogonum argillosum was scientifically described in 1932 by John Thomas Howell and placed in the Eriogonum genus. The species is classified in the Polygonaceae and has no botanical synonyms.
