= Eriogonum molestum =

Conservation status
- Imperiled (NatureServe)

Scientific classification
- Kingdom: Plantae
- Clade: Tracheophytes
- Clade: Angiosperms
- Clade: Eudicots
- Order: Caryophyllales
- Family: Polygonaceae
- Genus: Eriogonum
- Species: E. molestum

Binomial name
- Eriogonum molestum S.Wats.

Species of wild buckwheat

Eriogonum molestum is a species of wild buckwheat known by the common name pineland buckwheat. It is endemic to southern California, where it grows in the Transverse Ranges of Ventura County to the Peninsular Ranges of San Diego County.

== Description ==
Eriogonum molestum is an annual herb producing a slender, erect, hairless flowering stem up to a meter tall. The woolly, rounded to oblong leaves are located around the base of the stem. The branches of the inflorescence produce many small clusters of tiny white to pinkish flowers.
