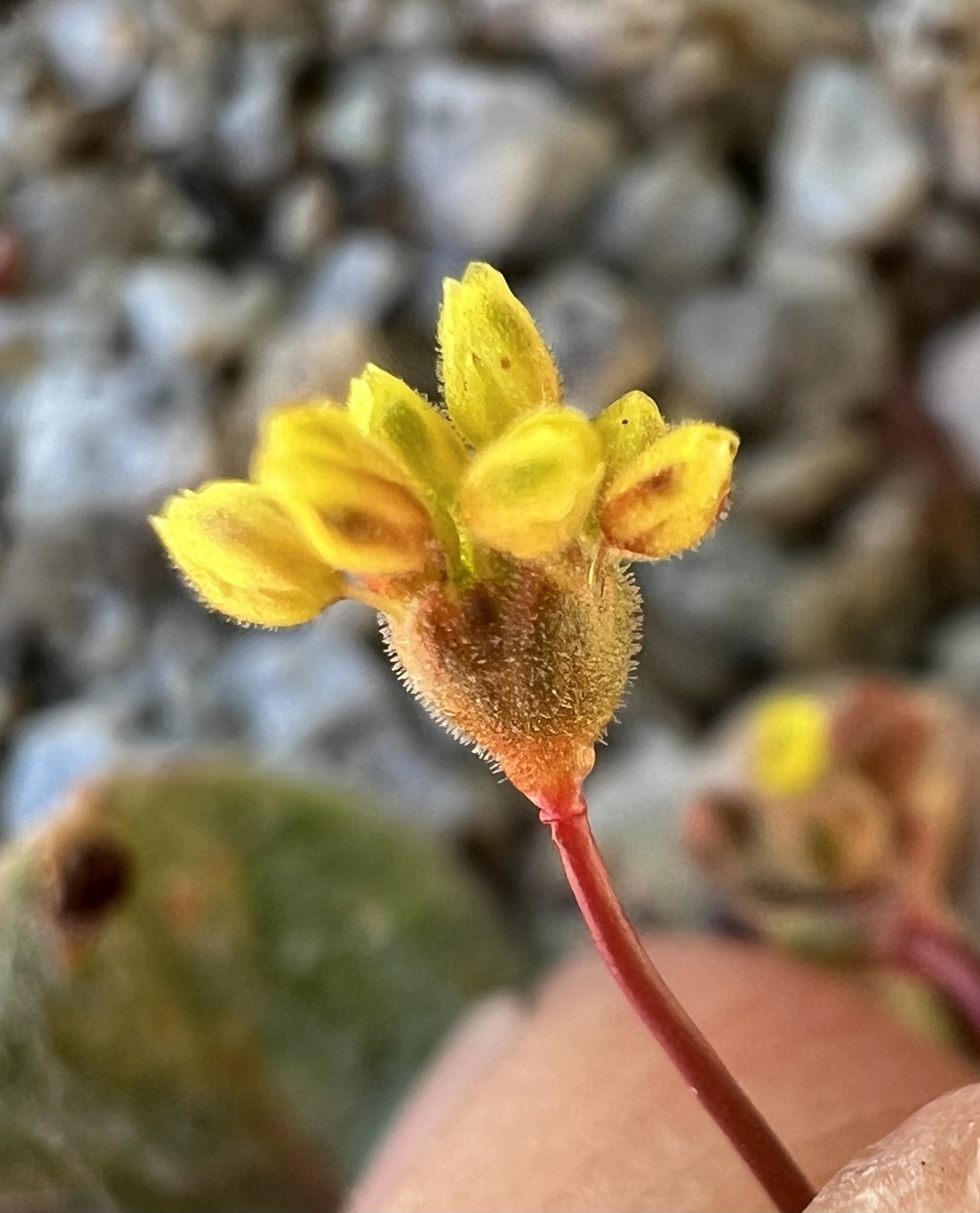

Scientific classification
- Kingdom: Plantae
- Clade: Tracheophytes
- Clade: Angiosperms
- Clade: Eudicots
- Order: Caryophyllales
- Family: Polygonaceae
- Genus: Eriogonum
- Species: E. pusillum

Binomial name
- Eriogonum pusillum Torr. & Gray

= Eriogonum pusillum =

Species of wild buckwheat

Eriogonum pusillum is a species of wild buckwheat known by the common name yellowturbans. It is native to the western United States where it grows in sandy soils in a number of habitats, especially in the Mojave Desert and Great Basin.

== Description ==
This is a small annual herb reaching heights of anywhere from 5 to 30 centimeters. The woolly leaves are located at the base of the plant and are about a centimeter long and rounded.

The spindly naked branches of the inflorescence rise and branch, producing cup-shaped flower clusters at each node along the branches. Each tiny, glandular flower is about three millimeters wide at its maximum and turns from bright yellow to orange-red to red.

== Desert tortoise ==
This is a food plant for the desert tortoise (Gopherus agassizii).
