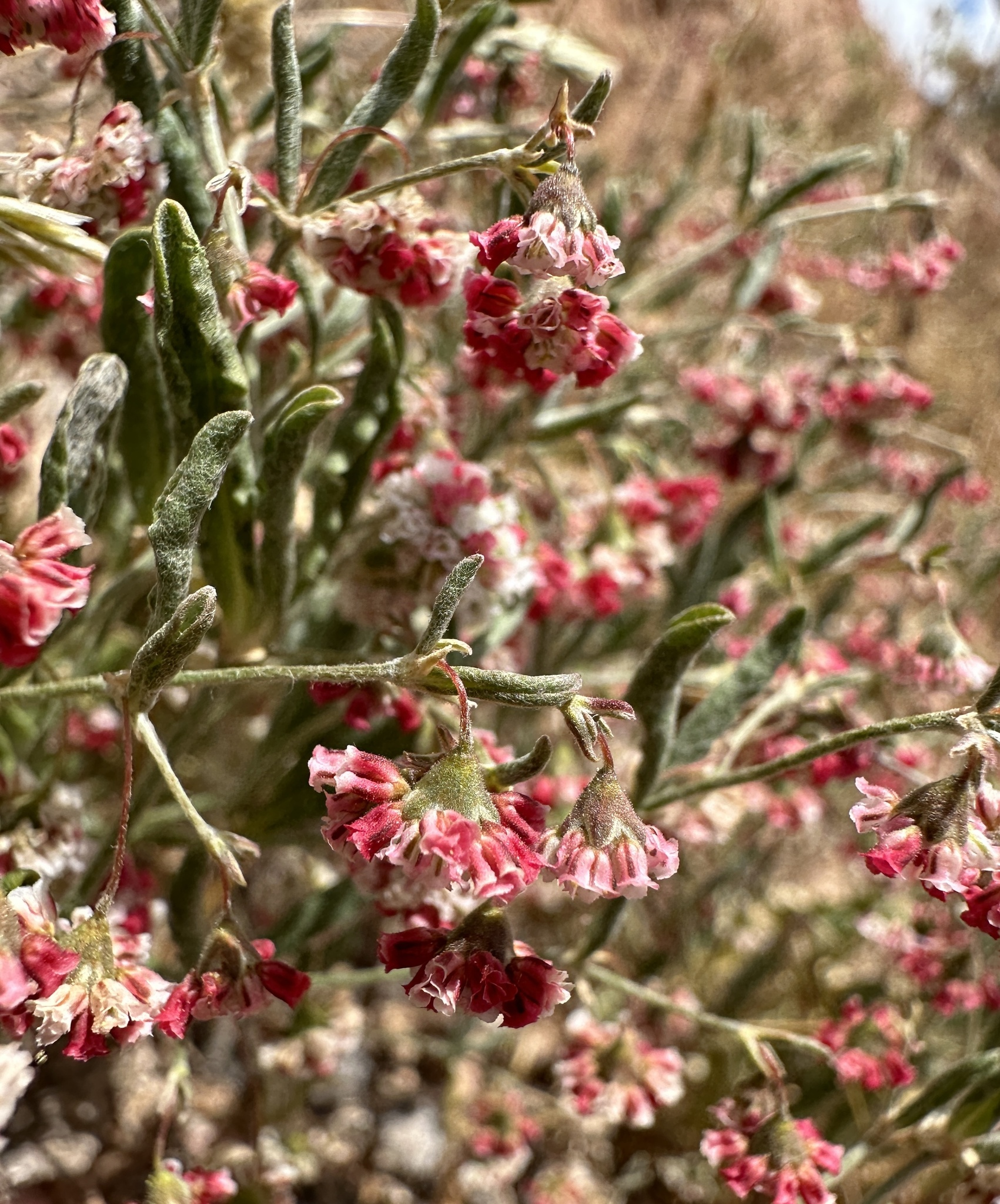

Scientific classification
- Kingdom: Plantae
- Clade: Tracheophytes
- Clade: Angiosperms
- Clade: Eudicots
- Order: Caryophyllales
- Family: Polygonaceae
- Genus: Eriogonum
- Species: E. gracillimum

Binomial name
- Eriogonum gracillimum S.Wats.

= Eriogonum gracillimum =

Species of wild buckwheat

Eriogonum gracillimum is a species of wild buckwheat known by the common name rose and white buckwheat. It is endemic to California but is common and widespread in many areas there. This is a spindly annual herb reaching anywhere from 5 to 50 centimeters in height. Most of the leaves are basal with a few scattered on the thin branched stem and are generally one to four centimeters long and somewhat woolly, with edges rolled under. Along the thread-thin branches of the stem appear small clusters of flowers which hang on short stalks in bell-shaped involucres. The two-millimeter-wide flowers are bright rose and white in color.
