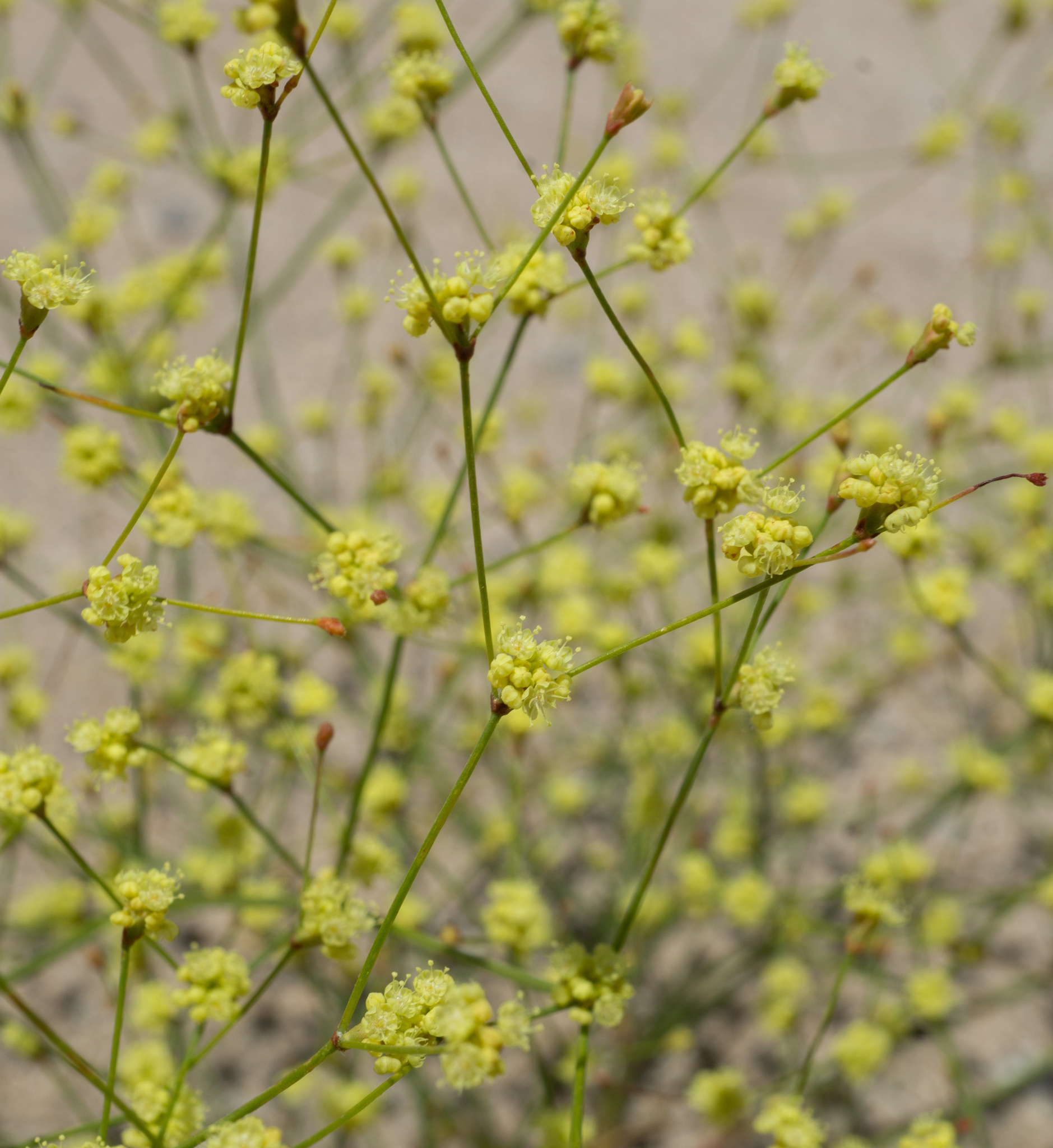

Conservation status
- Imperiled (NatureServe)

Scientific classification
- Kingdom: Plantae
- Clade: Tracheophytes
- Clade: Angiosperms
- Clade: Eudicots
- Order: Caryophyllales
- Family: Polygonaceae
- Genus: Eriogonum
- Species: E. mohavense

Binomial name
- Eriogonum mohavense S.Wats.

= Eriogonum mohavense =

Species of wild buckwheat

Eriogonum mohavense is a species of wild buckwheat known by the common name Western Mojave buckwheat. It is endemic to the Mojave Desert of California. It is an annual herb producing a slender, erect flowering stem up to about 30 centimetres (12 in) tall. The woolly, rounded leaves are located around the base of the stem. The branches of the inflorescence produce many small clusters of tiny yellow flowers.
