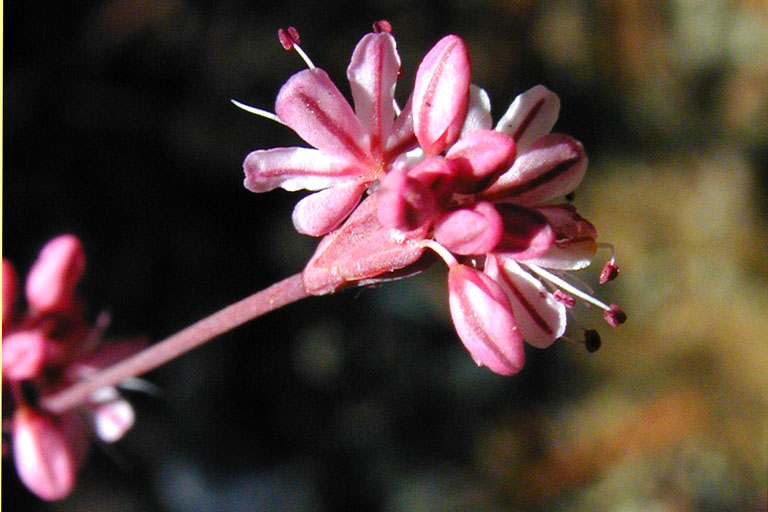
- var. caninum

Scientific classification
- Kingdom: Plantae
- Clade: Tracheophytes
- Clade: Angiosperms
- Clade: Eudicots
- Order: Caryophyllales
- Family: Polygonaceae
- Genus: Eriogonum
- Species: E. luteolum

Binomial name
- Eriogonum luteolum Greene

= Eriogonum luteolum =

Species of wild buckwheat

Eriogonum luteolum is a species of wild buckwheat known by the common name goldencarpet buckwheat. It is native to many of the mountain ranges of California and southern Oregon, including the Sierra Nevada, Cascades and California Coast Ranges. It grows in mountain and foothill habitat, such as forest and woodland, on granite and sometimes serpentine soils.

== Description ==
This is an annual herb varying in size and form from erect to 60 centimeters tall to prostrate and spreading in a mat. The woolly leaves are rounded and petioled and are mostly located around the base of the plant, but sometimes appear higher on the stem.

The branches of the flowering stem bear many small clusters of white to bright pink or yellow flowers, each just a few millimeters long.
