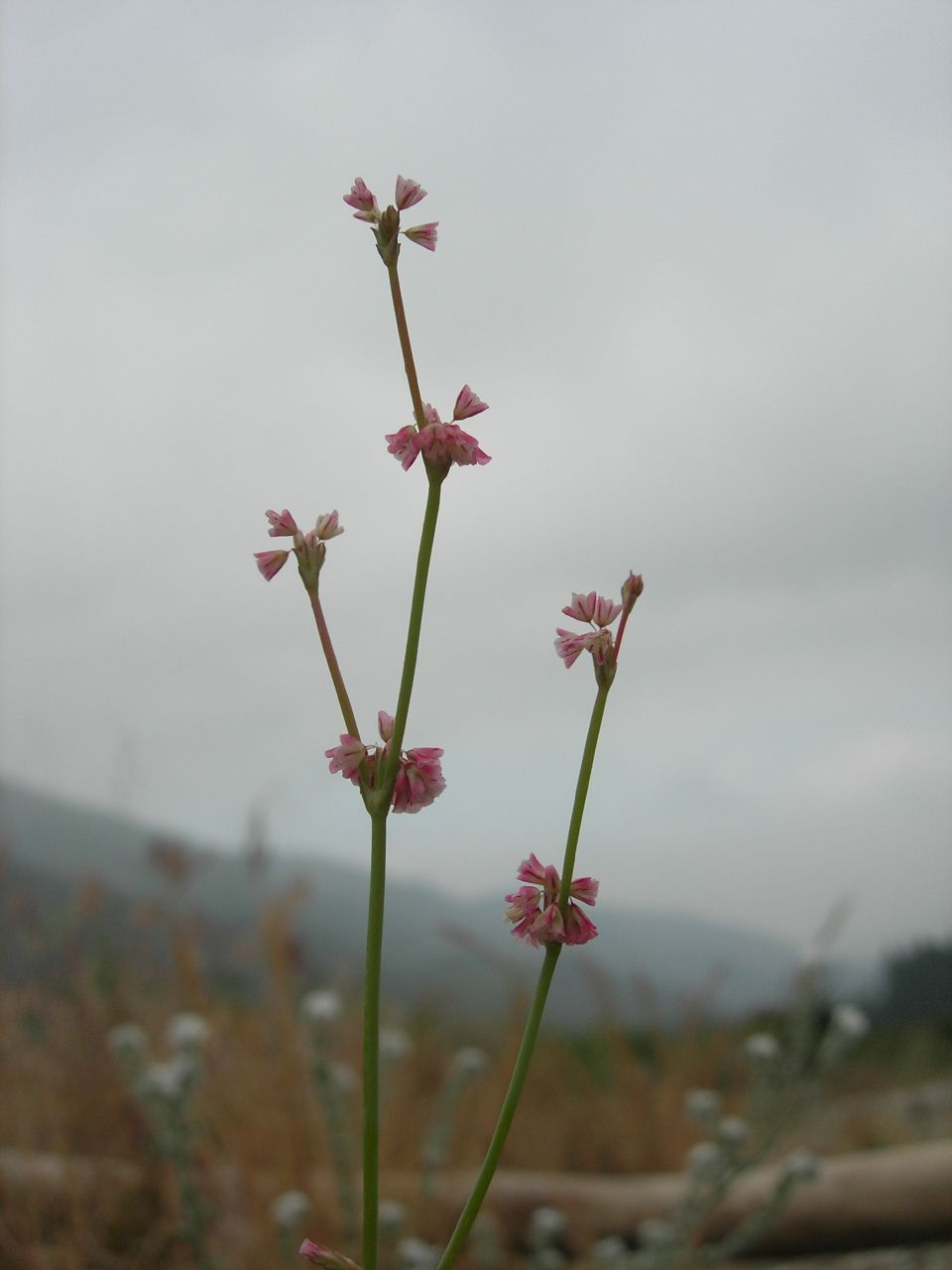

Scientific classification
- Kingdom: Plantae
- Clade: Tracheophytes
- Clade: Angiosperms
- Clade: Eudicots
- Order: Caryophyllales
- Family: Polygonaceae
- Genus: Eriogonum
- Species: E. davidsonii

Binomial name
- Eriogonum davidsonii Greene

= Eriogonum davidsonii =

Species of wild buckwheat

Eriogonum davidsonii is a species of wild buckwheat known by the common name Davidson's buckwheat. This plant is native to the southwestern United States and northern Baja California. It grows in sandy or gravelly soils, mixed grassland, saltbush, chaparral, sagebrush communities as well as oak and montane conifer woodland. It is a spindly annual herb growing up to 40 centimeters in height. Leaves are fuzzy, basal, and round with wavy or wrinkly margins fuzzy. They are two centimeters wide. The plant is variable in appearance, but is usually erect with thin, naked, neatly branching stems bearing clusters of tiny flowers at widely spaced nodes. Each flower is about 2 millimeters wide, bell-shaped, and can be white, pink or red. Flowering occurs May to September.
