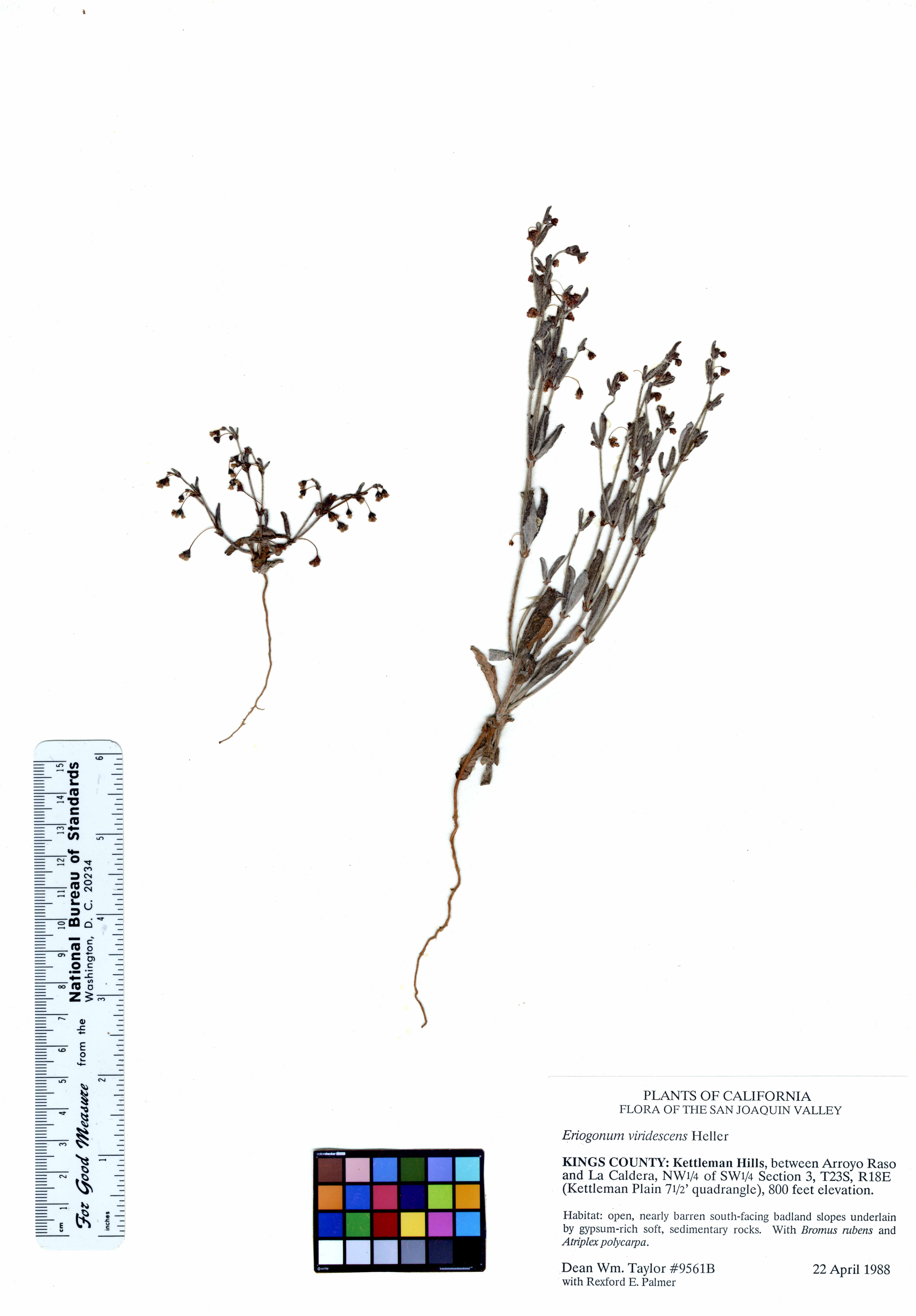

Scientific classification
- Kingdom: Plantae
- Clade: Tracheophytes
- Clade: Angiosperms
- Clade: Eudicots
- Order: Caryophyllales
- Family: Polygonaceae
- Genus: Eriogonum
- Species: E. viridescens

Binomial name
- Eriogonum viridescens A.Heller

Synonyms
- Eriogonum bidentatum

= Eriogonum viridescens =

Species of wild buckwheat

Eriogonum viridescens is a species of wild buckwheat known by the common name twotooth buckwheat. It is endemic to California, where it grows in the Central Coast Ranges through the Transverse Ranges and into the Mojave Desert, as well as in the Central Valley. It grows in a variety of habitat types, generally on clay and sandy soils.

== Description ==
This is a slender annual herb producing flowering stems up to about 30 centimeters tall surrounded at the bases by woolly oval leaves. The inflorescence is a wide open array of branches lined with clusters of white or pink flowers. Each flower has lobes that are only about a millimeter long and wider at the tips.
