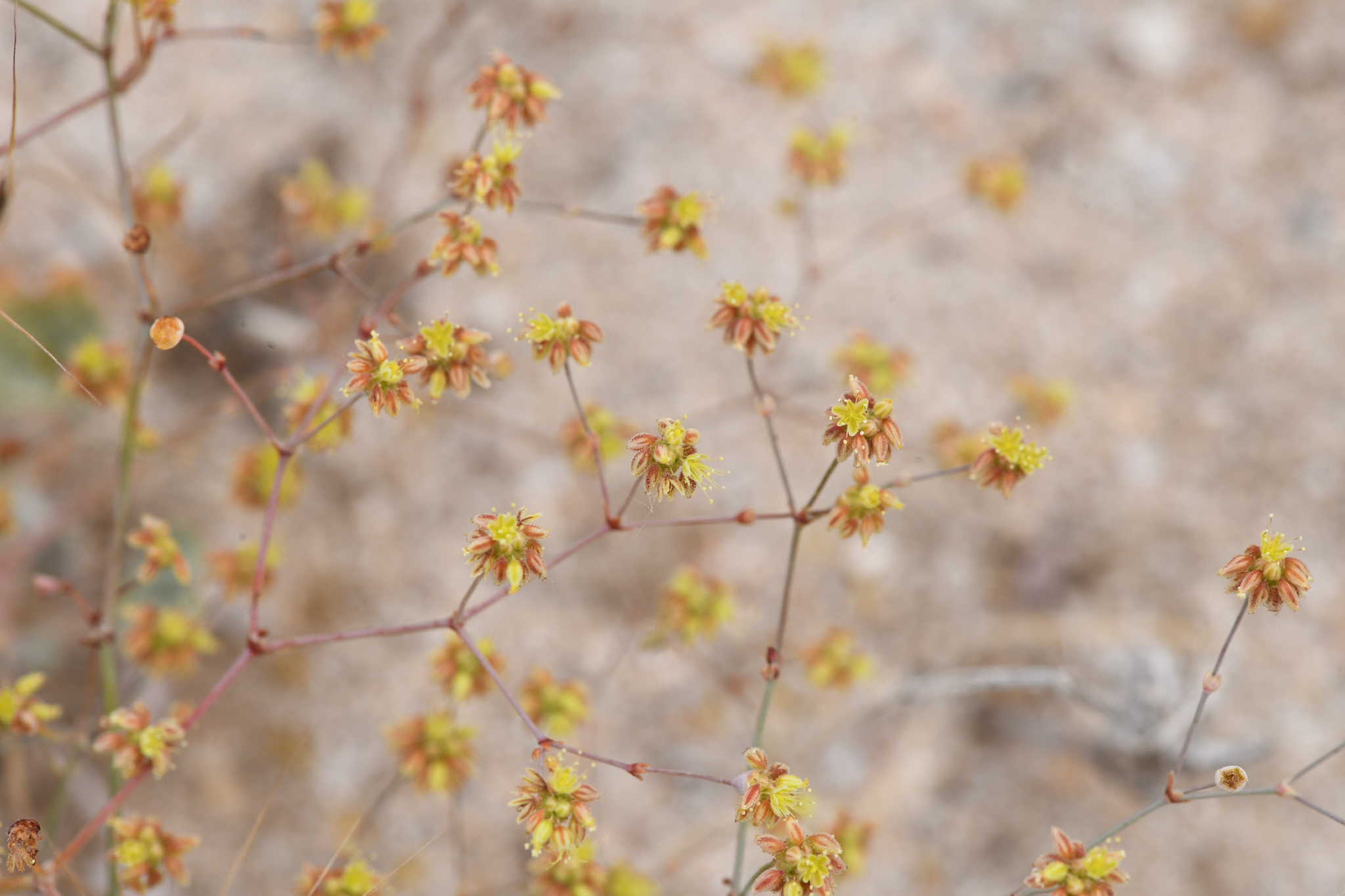

Scientific classification
- Kingdom: Plantae
- Clade: Tracheophytes
- Clade: Angiosperms
- Clade: Eudicots
- Order: Caryophyllales
- Family: Polygonaceae
- Genus: Eriogonum
- Species: E. reniforme

Binomial name
- Eriogonum reniforme Torr. & Frém.

= Eriogonum reniforme =

Species of wild buckwheat

Eriogonum reniforme is a species of wild buckwheat known by the common name kidney-leaf buckwheat. It is native to the desert southwest of the United States in California, Arizona, and Nevada, and its range may extend into Mexico.

== Description ==
This is an annual herb ranging in maximum height from 5 to 40 centimeters. Its leaves are located at its base and are rounded to spade-shaped, not always kidney-shaped, and are woolly and one or two centimeters long.

The naked reddish inflorescence is dotted with whitish glands. It bears small clusters of flowers which are yellow at first and then become red. They have tepals of different shapes, with the inner ones somewhat elongated.
