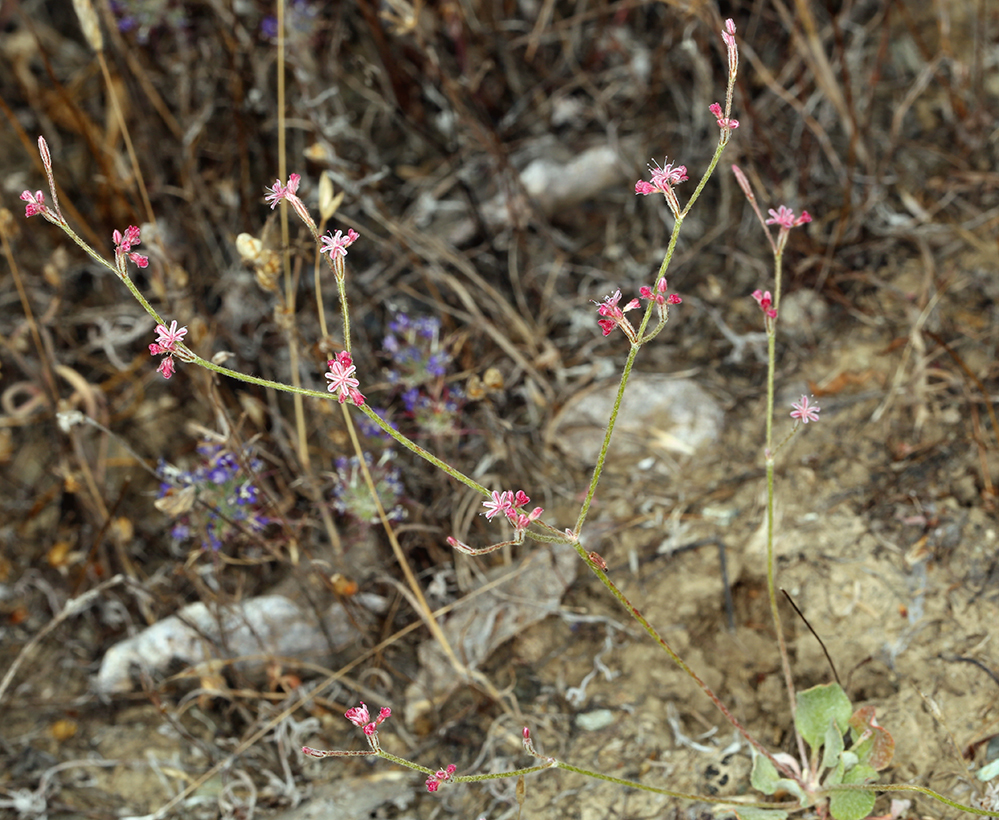

Scientific classification
- Kingdom: Plantae
- Clade: Tracheophytes
- Clade: Angiosperms
- Clade: Eudicots
- Order: Caryophyllales
- Family: Polygonaceae
- Genus: Eriogonum
- Species: E. dasyanthemum

Binomial name
- Eriogonum dasyanthemum Torr. & Gray

= Eriogonum dasyanthemum =

Species of wild buckwheat

Eriogonum dasyanthemum is a species of wild buckwheat known by the common name chaparral buckwheat. This plant is endemic to California where it is limited to the Northern Coast Ranges, but it is quite common in its native range.

== Description ==
It is an annual herb with spindly gray to reddish fuzzy stems that grow to a maximum of 60 centimeters in height. Leaves are basal, small, and less than two centimeters long. The plant produces tiny clusters of pink flowers on its spreading branches. Each flower cluster is less than a centimeter wide. Flowers bloom May to October.
