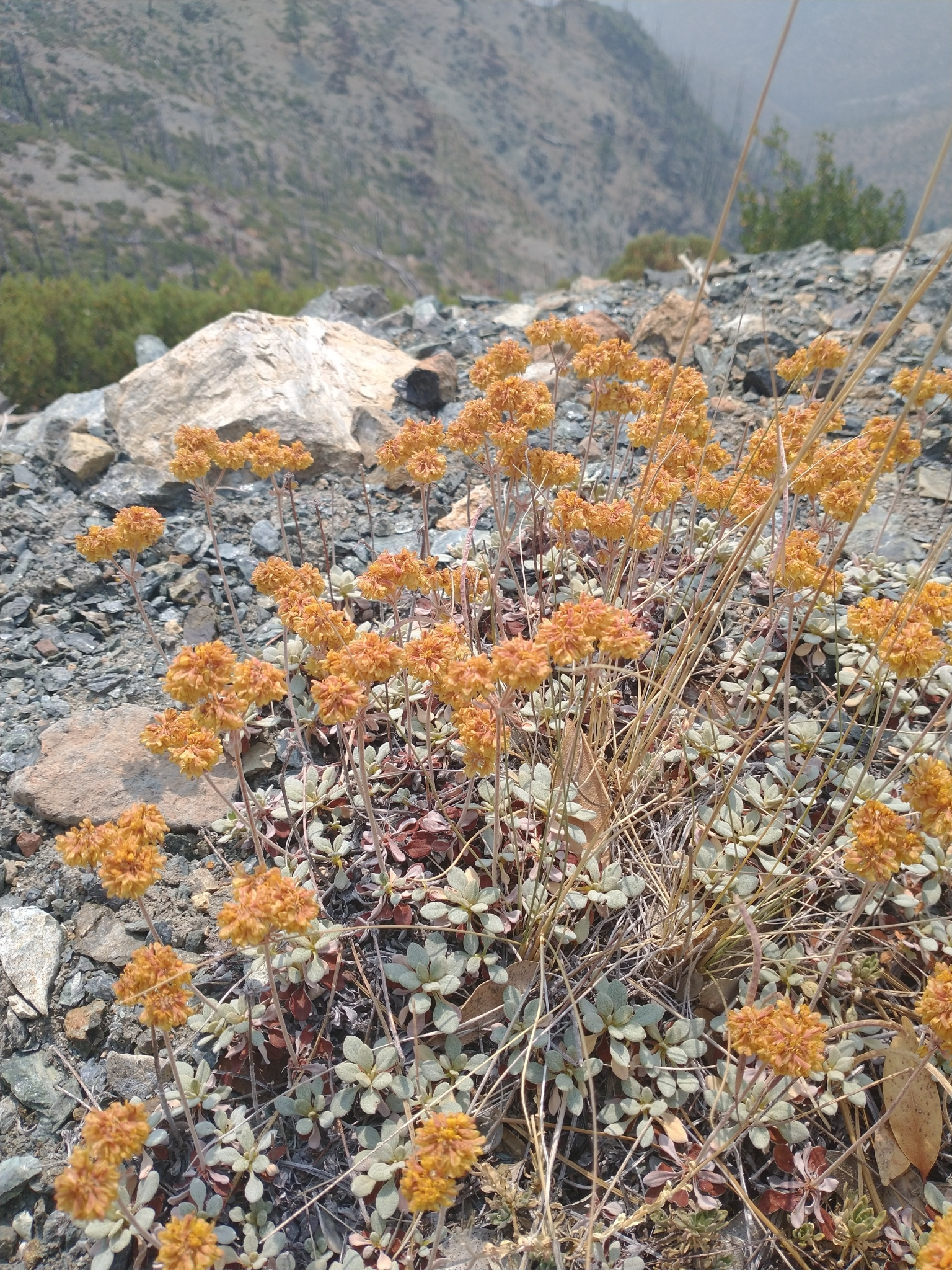

Scientific classification
- Kingdom: Plantae
- Clade: Tracheophytes
- Clade: Angiosperms
- Clade: Eudicots
- Order: Caryophyllales
- Family: Polygonaceae
- Genus: Eriogonum
- Species: E. ternatum

Binomial name
- Eriogonum ternatum Howell

= Eriogonum ternatum =

Species of wild buckwheat

Eriogonum ternatum is a species of wild buckwheat known by the common name ternate buckwheat. It is native to mountain ranges of northern California and southern Oregon, where it grows in the serpentine soil of the forests. This is a perennial herb forming mats up to half a meter wide with rosetted clusters of oval to rounded woolly leaves each about a centimeter long. The inflorescence arises on a flowering stem and bears an umbel of bright yellow flowers.
