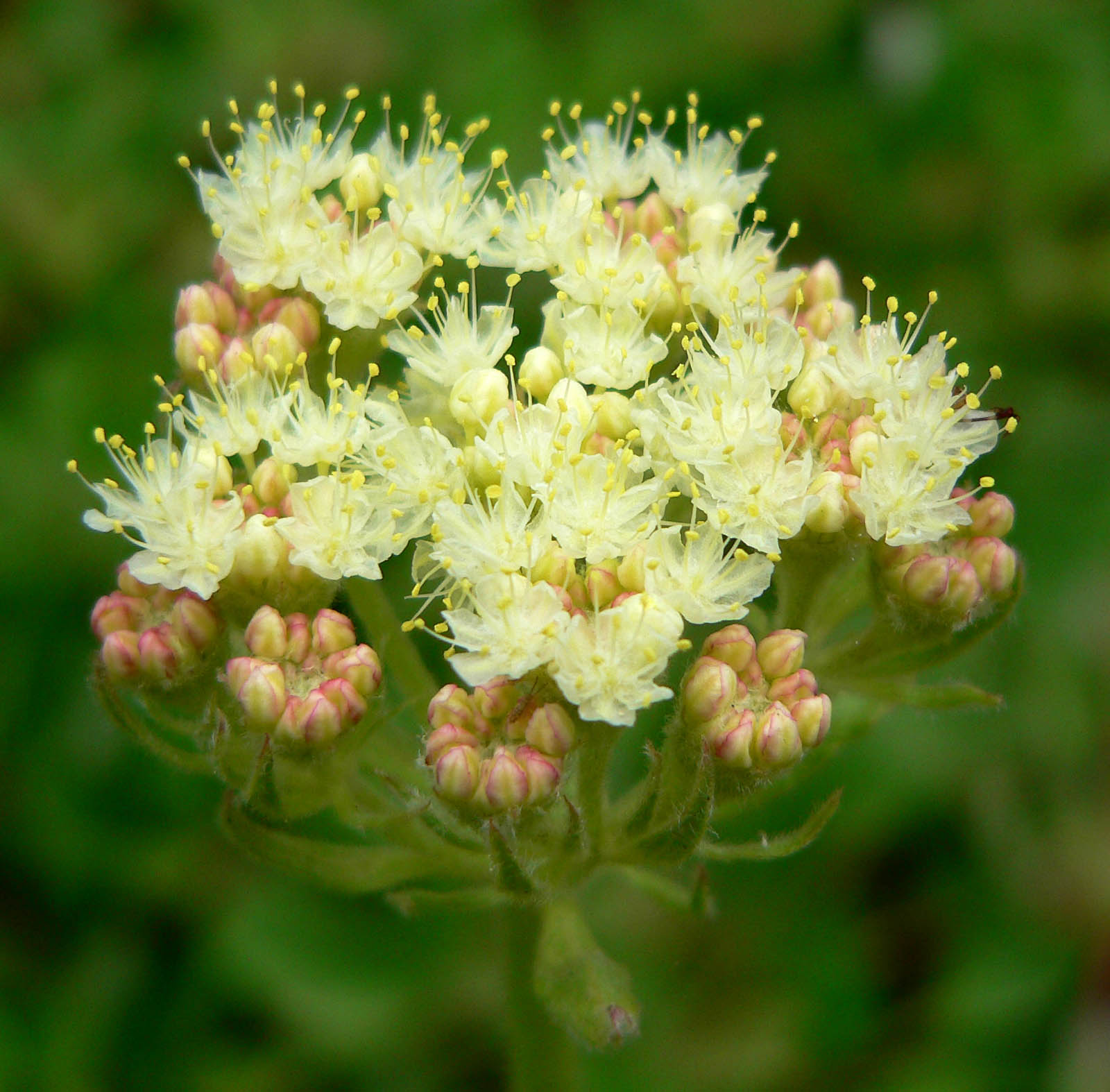

Scientific classification
- Kingdom: Plantae
- Clade: Tracheophytes
- Clade: Angiosperms
- Clade: Eudicots
- Order: Caryophyllales
- Family: Polygonaceae
- Genus: Eriogonum
- Species: E. ursinum

Binomial name
- Eriogonum ursinum S.Wats.

= Eriogonum ursinum =

Species of wild buckwheat

Eriogonum ursinum is a species of wild buckwheat known by the common names Bear Valley buckwheat and talus buckwheat. It is endemic to northern California where it is found on mountains from the northern Sierra Nevada to the southern Klamath Mountains.

== Description ==
This is an uncommon perennial herb growing mats of leaves from a woody caudex, spreading to 60 centimeters wide at the base and growing erect inflorescences up to 40 centimeters high. The leaves are pale green to yellowish, woolly, and up to about two centimeters long. The compound inflorescence is made up of clusters of pale yellow to pale pink flowers atop long, naked stems.
