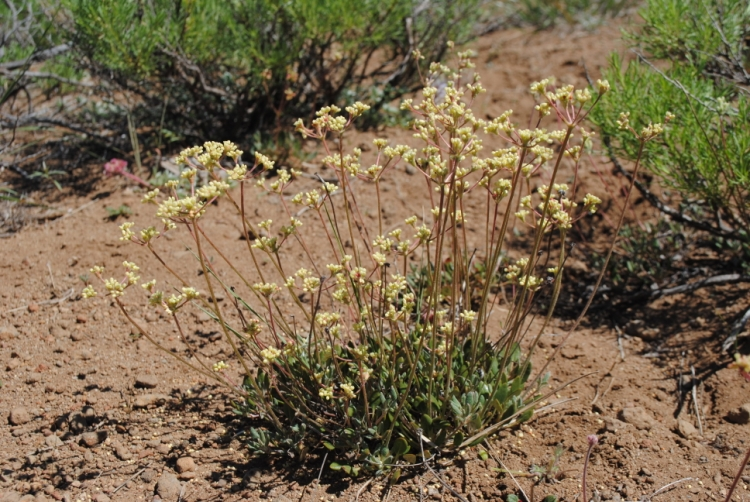

Scientific classification
- Kingdom: Plantae
- Clade: Tracheophytes
- Clade: Angiosperms
- Clade: Eudicots
- Order: Caryophyllales
- Family: Polygonaceae
- Genus: Eriogonum
- Species: E. marifolium

Binomial name
- Eriogonum marifolium Torr. & Gray

= Eriogonum marifolium =

Species of wild buckwheat

Eriogonum marifolium is a species of wild buckwheat known by the common name marumleaf buckwheat. It is native to the Sierra Nevada and Klamath Mountains of California and the ranges' extensions into Oregon and Nevada.

== Description ==
This is a dioecious mat-forming sub-shrub which grows on sandy mountain soils. It forms patches of wavy-edged pale green leaves and has erect, branching inflorescences reaching heights of anywhere from 10 to 40 centimeters.

The male and female plants are often so different in appearance that they look like separate species. The male plant produces clusters of tiny pale yellow staminate flowers and the female individuals produce clusters of much larger bright yellow or red pistillate flowers.
