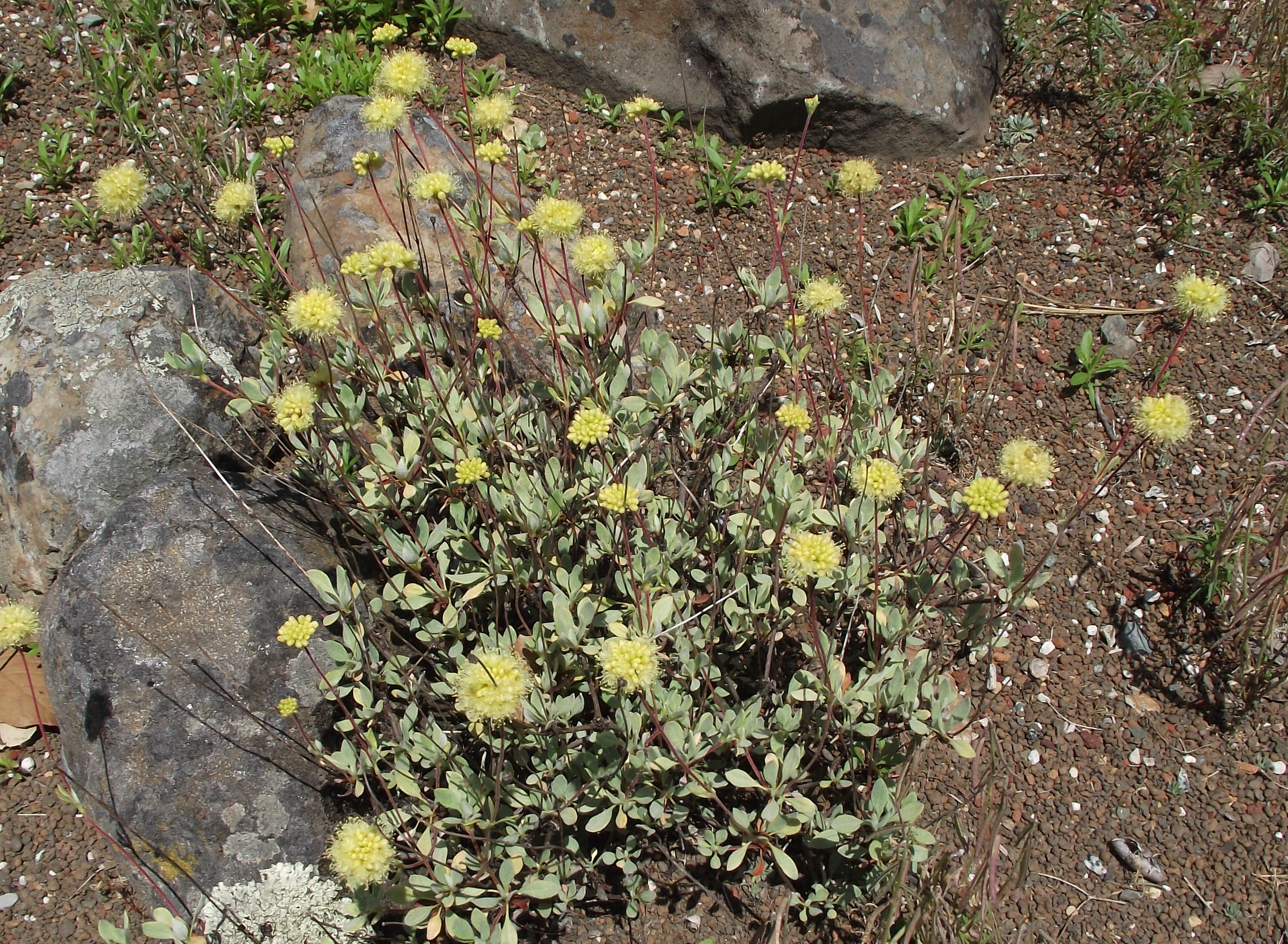
- var. avium

Scientific classification
- Kingdom: Plantae
- Clade: Tracheophytes
- Clade: Angiosperms
- Clade: Eudicots
- Order: Caryophyllales
- Family: Polygonaceae
- Genus: Eriogonum
- Species: E. prattenianum

Binomial name
- Eriogonum prattenianum Durand

= Eriogonum prattenianum =

Species of wild buckwheat

Eriogonum prattenianum is a species of wild buckwheat known by the common name Nevada City buckwheat.

== Description ==
Eriogonum prattenianum is a small shrub growing up to about half a meter tall when erect in form or growing in a clump or mat lined with oval-shaped woolly leaves. The inflorescence arises on a slender scape and bears a rounded cluster of yellow flowers.

== Distribution ==
Eriogonum prattenianum is endemic to California, where it can be found in many scattered disjunct populations in the Sierra Nevada and its foothills.

== Taxonomy ==
There are two varieties of this species. The more common var. prattenianum occurs in scattered populations in the mountains and foothills, while the uncommon var. avium is limited to granite outcrops in the Sierra Nevada slopes of Madera and Fresno Counties. The latter is generally a smaller plant than the former.
