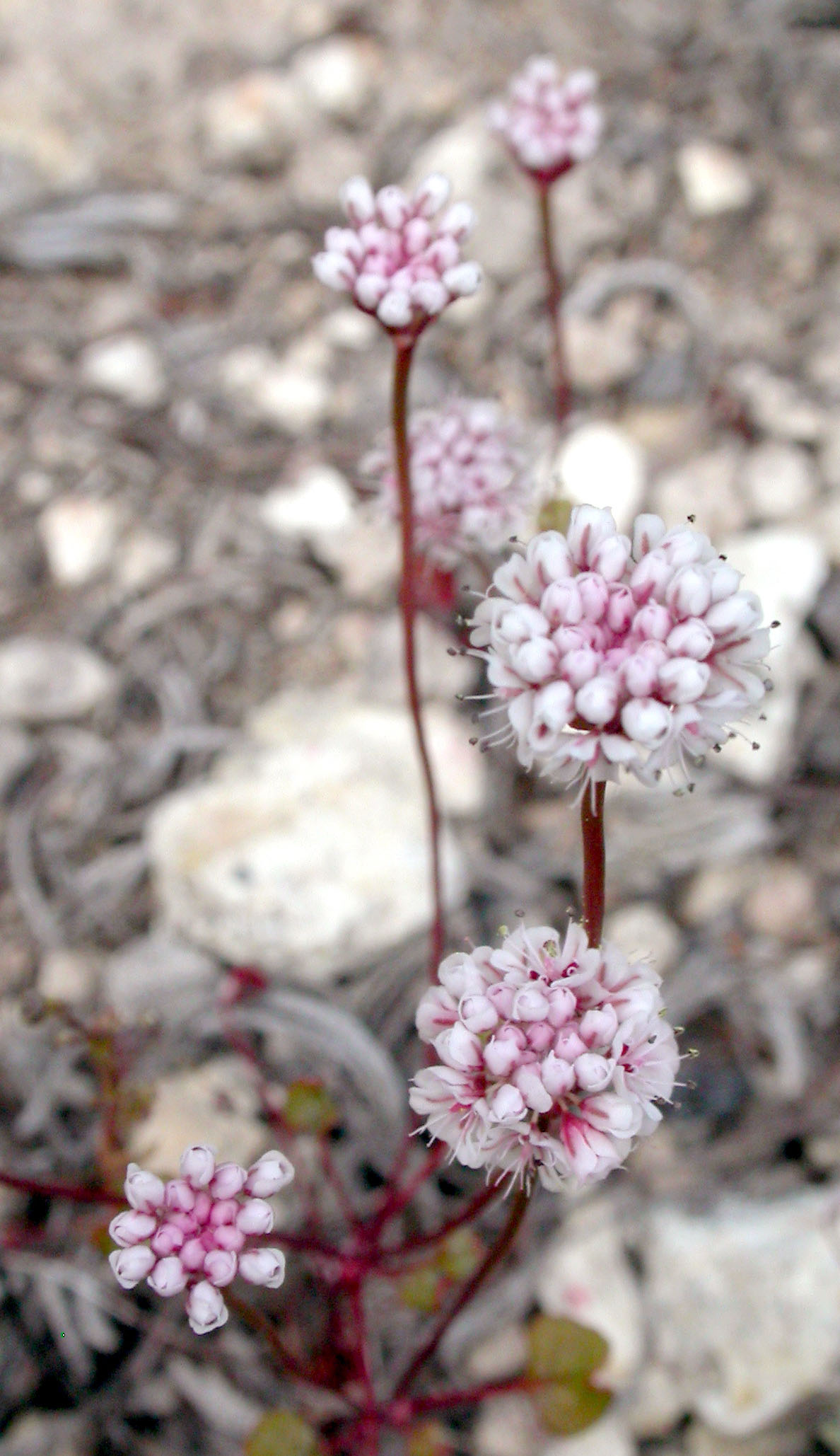

Conservation status
- Imperiled (NatureServe)

Scientific classification
- Kingdom: Plantae
- Clade: Tracheophytes
- Clade: Angiosperms
- Clade: Eudicots
- Order: Caryophyllales
- Family: Polygonaceae
- Genus: Eriogonum
- Species: E. nortonii

Binomial name
- Eriogonum nortonii Greene

= Eriogonum nortonii =

Species of wild buckwheat

Eriogonum nortonii is a species of wild buckwheat known by the common name Pinnacles buckwheat. This small annual herb is endemic to California where it is known mainly from a few occurrences around the border between Monterey and San Benito Counties. It is sometimes seen on the protected land of Pinnacles National Park.

== Description ==
This plant grows between 5 and 20 centimeters in height, with a thread-thin branched stem which is often red in color. Most of the leaves are 0.5 to 1.0 cm long and rounded, fuzzy underneath and wavy-edged. Tiny clusters of very light to deep pink flowers grow on minute erect stalks.
