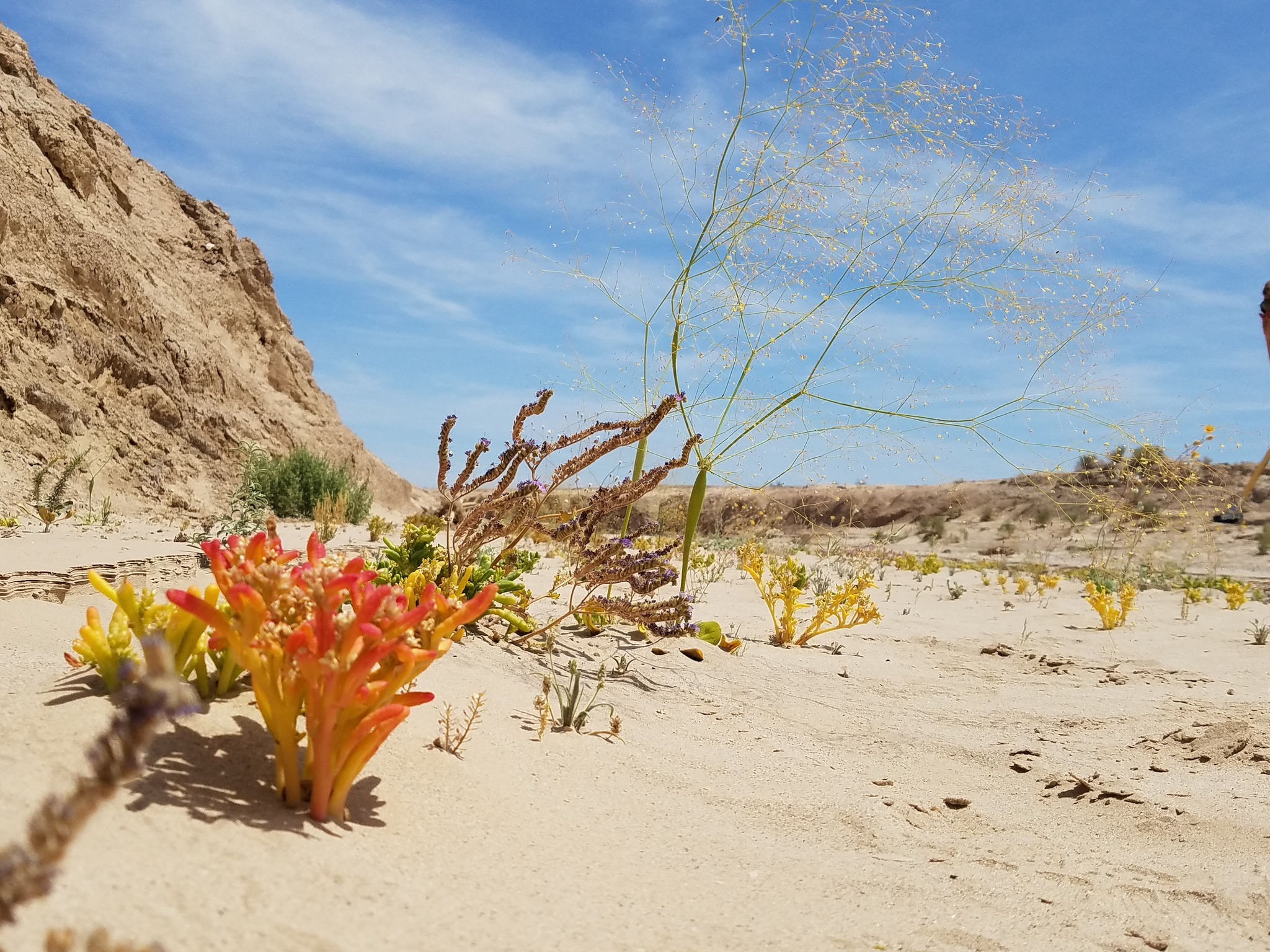
- Plant on far right with swollen stems; Ocotillo Wells State Vehicular Recreation Area, Imperial County, California, 2016

Scientific classification
- Kingdom: Plantae
- Clade: Tracheophytes
- Clade: Angiosperms
- Clade: Eudicots
- Order: Caryophyllales
- Family: Polygonaceae
- Genus: Eriogonum
- Species: E. trichopes

Binomial name
- Eriogonum trichopes Torr.

= Eriogonum trichopes =

Species of wild buckwheat

Eriogonum trichopes is a species of wild buckwheat known by the common name little desert trumpet. It is native to the mountain slopes and deserts of the southwestern United States from California to New Mexico, and its range extends into Mexico.

== Description ==
This is an annual herb quite variable in height, growing to a spindly 10 centimeters or a sprawling, brambly 1.5 meters. Its leaves form a basal patch on the ground, each rounded with ruffled margins and covered in woolly or stiff hairs.

The erect inflorescence is naked and sometimes hairy, with many slender branches that flower year-round. Flower clusters hang on short, thready stalks. Each minuscule flower is glandular or hairy and is bright yellow when new, darkening over time to a reddish color.
