= Eriogonum gossypinum =

Scientific classification
- Kingdom: Plantae
- Clade: Tracheophytes
- Clade: Angiosperms
- Clade: Eudicots
- Order: Caryophyllales
- Family: Polygonaceae
- Genus: Eriogonum
- Species: E. gossypinum

Binomial name
- Eriogonum gossypinum Curran

Species of wild buckwheat

Eriogonum gossypinum is an uncommon species of wild buckwheat known by the common name cottony buckwheat. It is endemic to California, where it is known from the southern Central Valley and some of the adjacent foothills. It is often found on clay soils. It is an annual herb producing a gray or reddish branched stem no more than about 20 centimeters tall. The leaves are oblong in shape and woolly in texture. The scattered inflorescences are small clusters of white to pink glandular flowers buried in a layer of cottony fibers.
