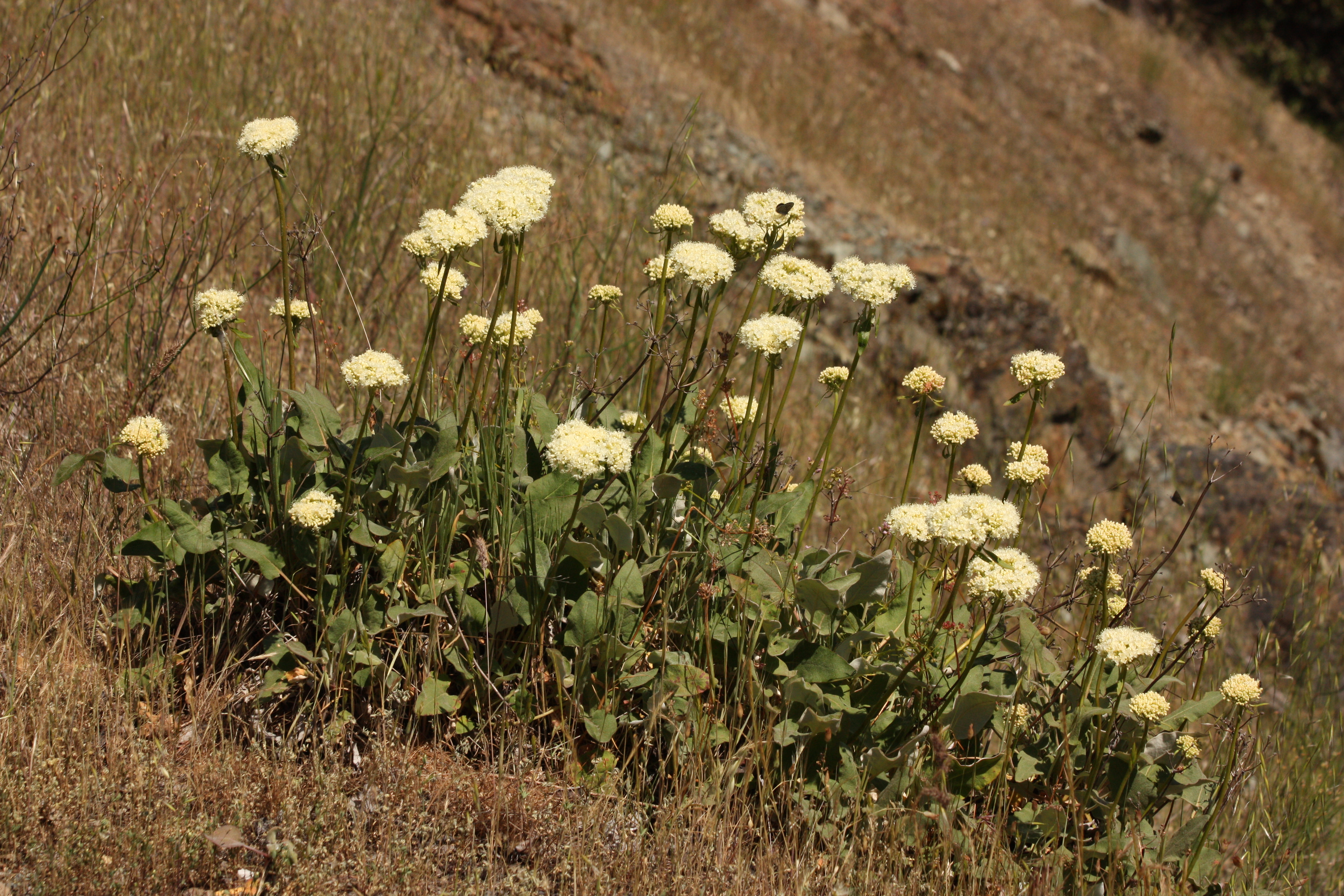
- Eriogonum compositum

Scientific classification
- Kingdom: Plantae
- Clade: Tracheophytes
- Clade: Angiosperms
- Clade: Eudicots
- Order: Caryophyllales
- Family: Polygonaceae
- Subfamily: Eriogonoideae
- Genus: Eriogonum; Michx.

Species
- Over 250, see text

Synonyms
- Espinosa Lag.; Eucycla Nutt.; Pterogonum H.Gross; Sanmartinia M.Buchinger; Trachytheca Nutt. ex Benth.

= Eriogonum =

Genus of North American wild buckwheats

Eriogonum is a genus of flowering plants in the family Polygonaceae. The genus is found in North America and is known as wild buckwheat. This is a highly species-rich genus, and indications are that active speciation is continuing. It includes some common wildflowers, such as the California buckwheat (Eriogonum fasciculatum).

The genus derived its name from the Greek word erion meaning 'wool' and gonu meaning 'knee or joint'. The author of the genus, Michaux, explained the name as describing the first named species of the genus (E. tomentosum) as a wooly plant with sharply bent stems ("planta lanata, geniculata"). Despite sharing the common name "buckwheat", Eriogonum is part of a different genus from the cultivated European buckwheat and than other plant species also called wild buckwheat.

In addition to the widespread common species, approximately a third of the species in the genus are rare, endangered, or threatened. One such species came into the news in 2005 when the Mount Diablo buckwheat (Eriogonum truncatum, believed to be extinct) was rediscovered.

== Ecology ==
Eriogonum species are used as food plants by the larvae of some Lepidoptera (butterflies and moths). An example of a butterfly that uses this plant for food is the Lycaena heteronea. Several of these are monophagous, meaning their caterpillars only feed on this genus, sometimes just on a single taxon of Eriogonum. Wild buckwheat flowers are also an important source of food for these and other Lepidoptera. In some cases, the relationship is so close that Eriogonum and dependent Lepidoptera are in danger of coextinction.

Monophagous Lepidoptera on wild buckwheat include:

- Apodemia mormo (Mormon metalmark) – feeds exclusively on Eriogonum
  - Apodemia mormo langei (Lange's metalmark) – only known from Eriogonum nudum ssp. auriculatum
- Chionodes dammersi – feeds exclusively on Eriogonum
- Chionodes luteogeminatus – only known from Eriogonum niveum
- Euphilotes enoptes smithi (Smith's blue butterfly) – only known from Eriogonum latifolium and Eriogonum parvifolium
- Euphilotes battoides allyni (El Segundo blue butterfly) - only known from Eriogonum parvifolium

Additionally, bees of the sagebrush steppe rely on the nectar of desert buckwheats, and birds and rodents eat the seeds.

== Uses ==
Some varieties of eriogonum, such as California buckwheat were and still are used as medicinal and food crops by Native American tribes.

== Selected species ==
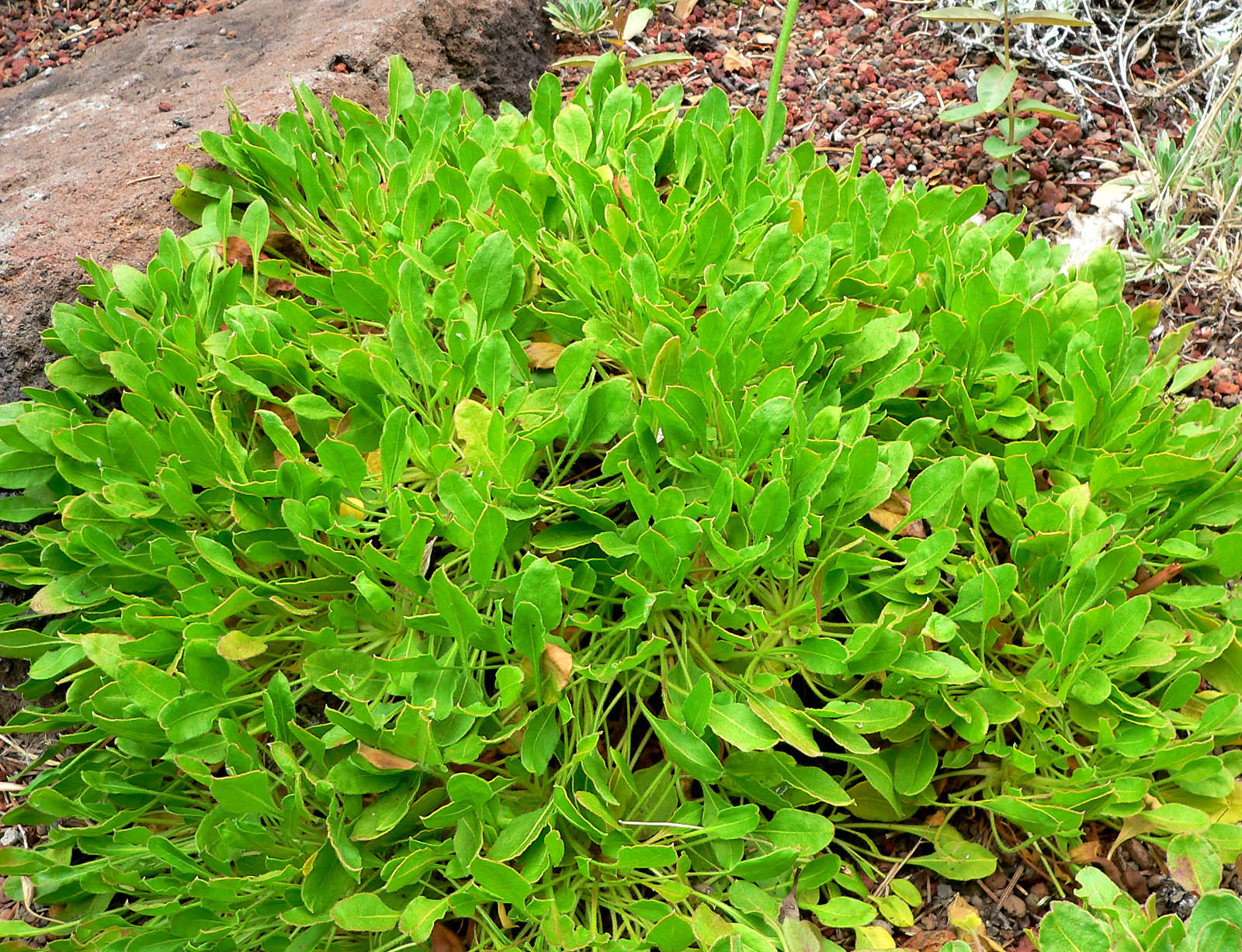
Eriogonum hirtellum

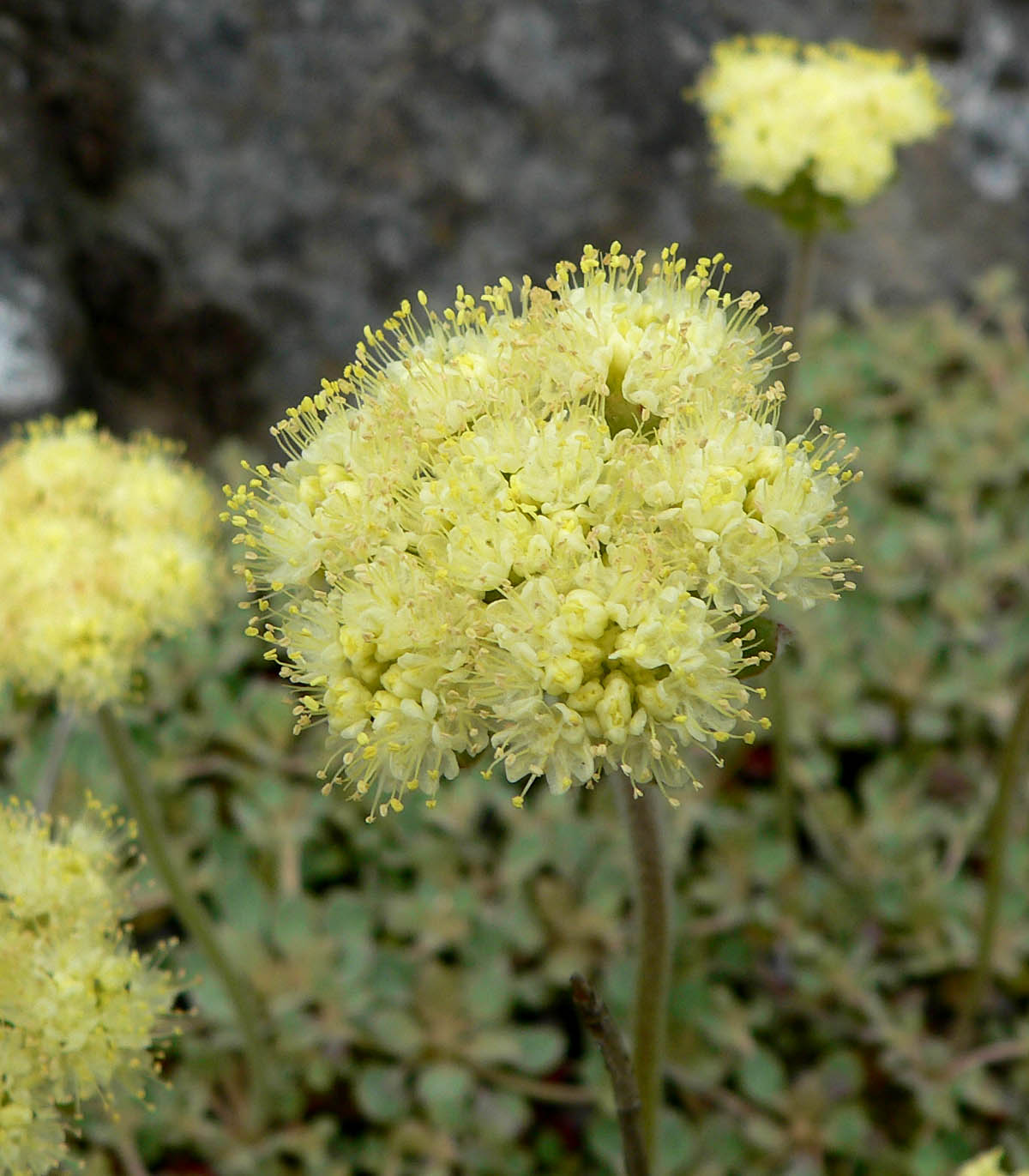
Talus buckwheat Eriogonum ursinum

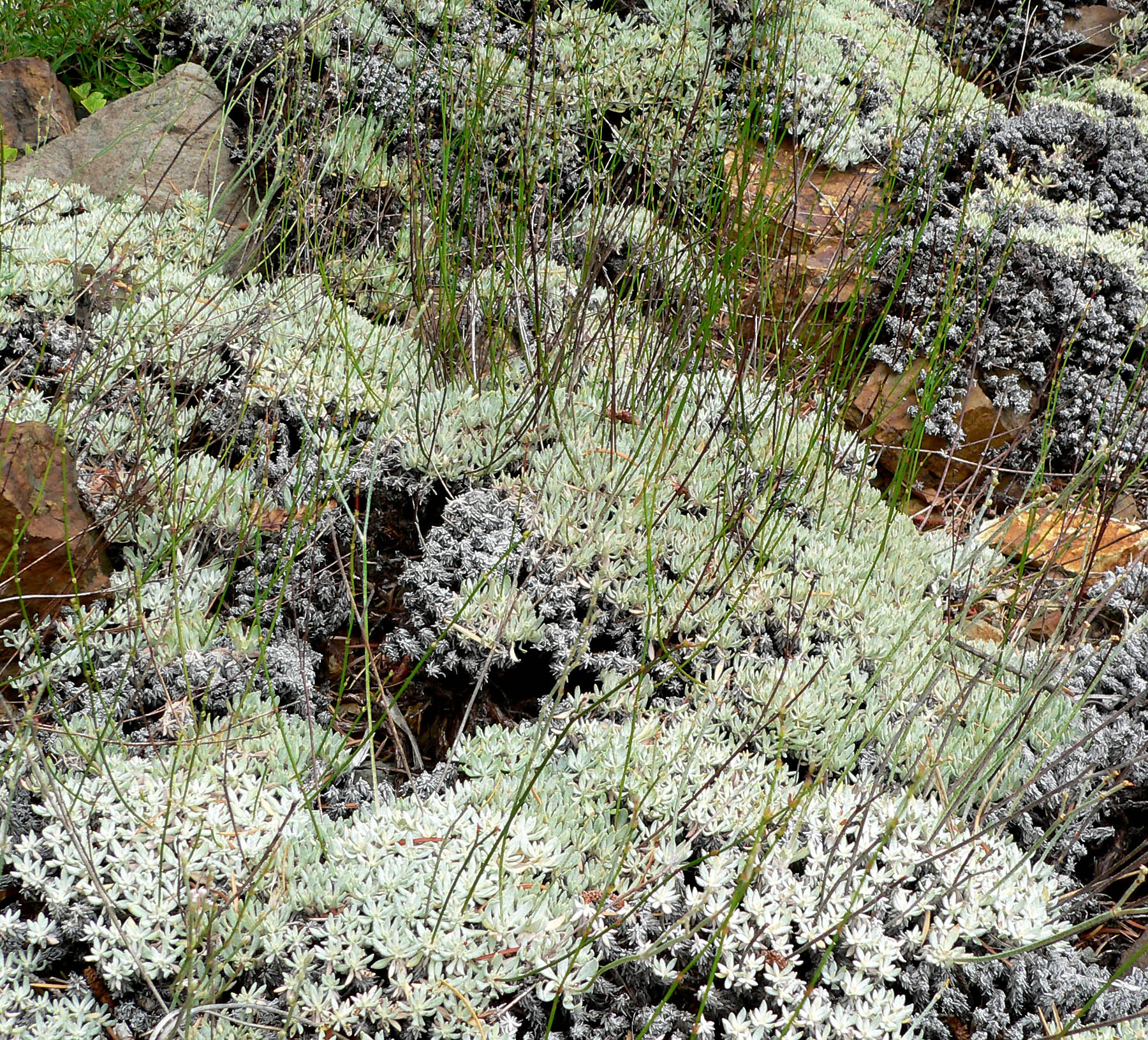
Eriogonum wrightii var. subscaposum

- Eriogonum abertianum – Abert's buckwheat
- Eriogonum alatum – winged buckwheat
- Eriogonum alexanderae
- Eriogonum aliquantum – Cimarron buckwheat
- Eriogonum allenii – shale barren wild buckwheat
- Eriogonum alpinum – trinity buckwheat
- Eriogonum ampullaceum – mono buckwheat
- Eriogonum androsaceum – rock-jasmine buckwheat
- Eriogonum angulosum – anglestem buckwheat
- Eriogonum apiculatum – San Jacinto buckwheat
- Eriogonum apricum – Ione buckwheat
- Eriogonum arborescens – Santa Cruz Island buckwheat
- Eriogonum argillosum – clay buckwheat
- Eriogonum argophyllum – Sulphur Hot Springs buckwheat, Ruby Valley buckwheat
- Eriogonum baileyi – Bailey's buckwheat
- Eriogonum bicolor – Pretty buckwheat
- Eriogonum brachyanthum – shortflower buckwheat
- Eriogonum brachypodum – Parry's buckwheat
- Eriogonum brandegeei – Brandegee's buckwheat
- Eriogonum breedlovei – Paiute buckwheat
- Eriogonum brevicaule – shortstem buckwheat
- Eriogonum butterworthianum – Butterworth's buckwheat
- Eriogonum caespitosum – matted buckwheat
- Eriogonum calcareum
- Eriogonum callistum – Tehachapi buckwheat
- Eriogonum cedrorum – The Cedars buckwheat
- Eriogonum cernuum – nodding buckwheat
- Eriogonum cinereum – ashyleaf buckwheat, coastal buckwheat
- Eriogonum cithariforme – Cithara buckwheat
- Eriogonum codium – basalt desert buckwheat
- Eriogonum coloradense – Colorado buckwheat
- Eriogonum compositum – arrowleaf buckwheat
- Eriogonum congdonii – Congdon's buckwheat
- Eriogonum contiguum – Reveal's buckwheat
- Eriogonum corymbosum – crispleaf buckwheat
  - Eriogonum corymbosum var. nilesii – Nile's wild buckwheat, Las Vegas buckwheat
- Eriogonum covilleanum – Coville's buckwheat
- Eriogonum crocatum – conejo buckwheat or saffron buckwheat
- Eriogonum crosbyae – Crosby's buckwheat
- Eriogonum cusickii – Cusick's buckwheat
- Eriogonum dasyanthemum – chaparral buckwheat
- Eriogonum davidsonii – Davidson's buckwheat
- Eriogonum deflexum – flatcrown buckwheat
- Eriogonum deserticola – Colorado Desert buckwheat
- Eriogonum diatomaceum – Churchill Narrows buckwheat
- Eriogonum diclinum – Jaynes Canyon buckwheat
- Eriogonum domitum
- Eriogonum douglasii – Douglas buckwheat
- Eriogonum elatum – tall woolly buckwheat
- Eriogonum encelioides – Encelia buckwheat
- Eriogonum eremicola – Telescope Peak buckwheat
- Eriogonum evanidum – vanishing wild buckwheat
- Eriogonum exilifolium – dropleaf buckwheat
- Eriogonum fasciculatum – California buckwheat
- Eriogonum flavum – yellow buckwheat
- Eriogonum giganteum – Saint Catherine's lace
  - Eriogonum giganteum var. compactum – Santa Barbara Island buckwheat
- Eriogonum gilmanii – Gilman's buckwheat

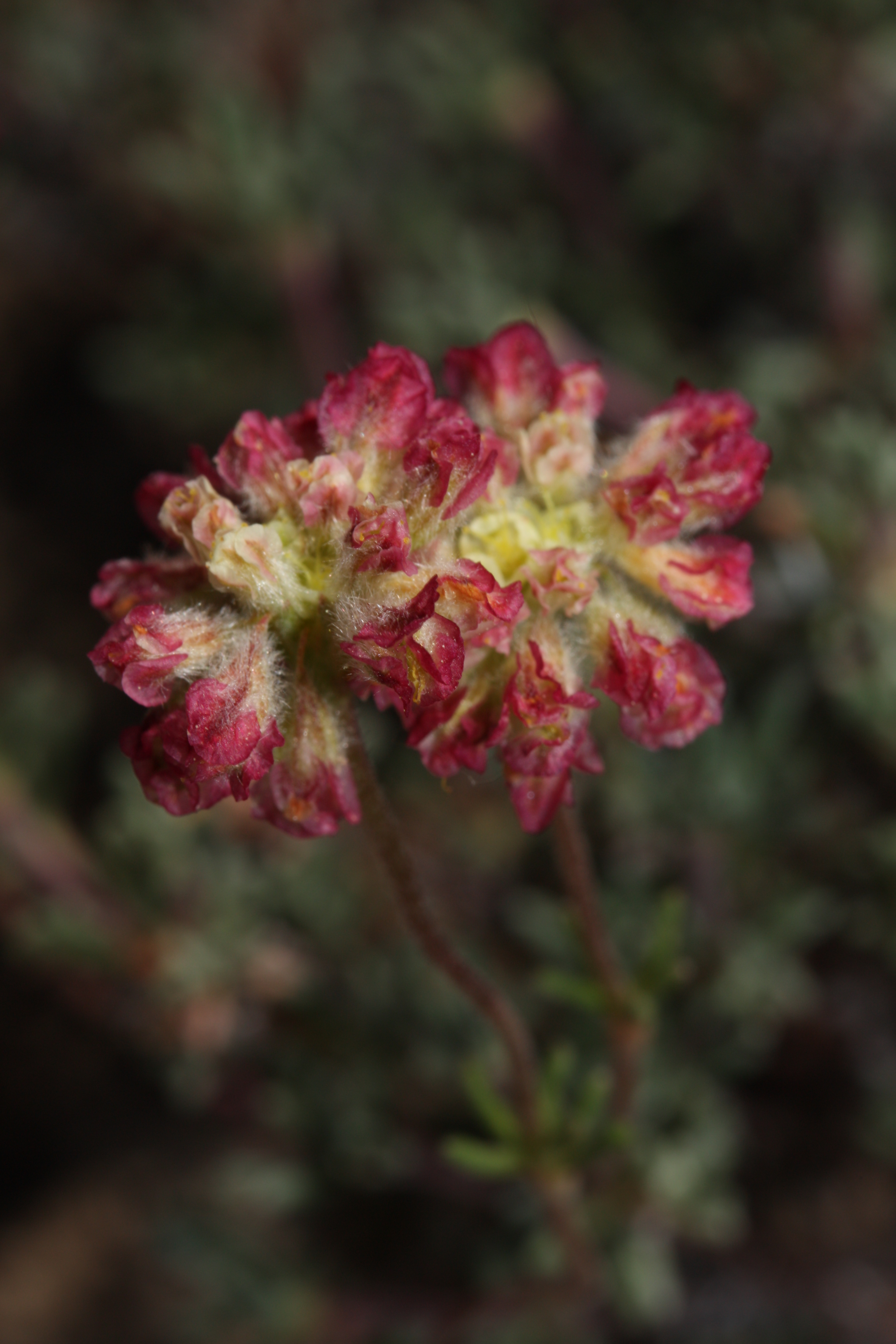
Eriogonum thymoides

- Eriogonum gossypinum – cottony buckwheat
- Eriogonum gracile – slender woolly buckwheat
- Eriogonum gracilipes – White Mountain buckwheat, raspberry buckwheat
- Eriogonum gracillimum – rose and white buckwheat
- Eriogonum grande – redflower buckwheat
- Eriogonum gypsophilum – gypsum wild buckwheat
- Eriogonum heermannii – Heermann's buckwheat
- Eriogonum helichrysoides – Strawflower wild buckwheat
- Eriogonum heracleoides – parsnip-flower Buckwheat
- Eriogonum hirtellum – Klamath Mountain Buckwheat
- Eriogonum hoffmannii – Hoffmann's buckwheat
- Eriogonum hookeri – Hooker's buckwheat
- Eriogonum incanum – frosted buckwheat
- Eriogonum inflatum – desert trumpet, bladderstem, Indian pipe-weed
- Eriogonum intrafractum – napkinring, jointed buckwheat
- Eriogonum jamesii – James' buckwheat
- Eriogonum kelloggii – red mountain buckwheat

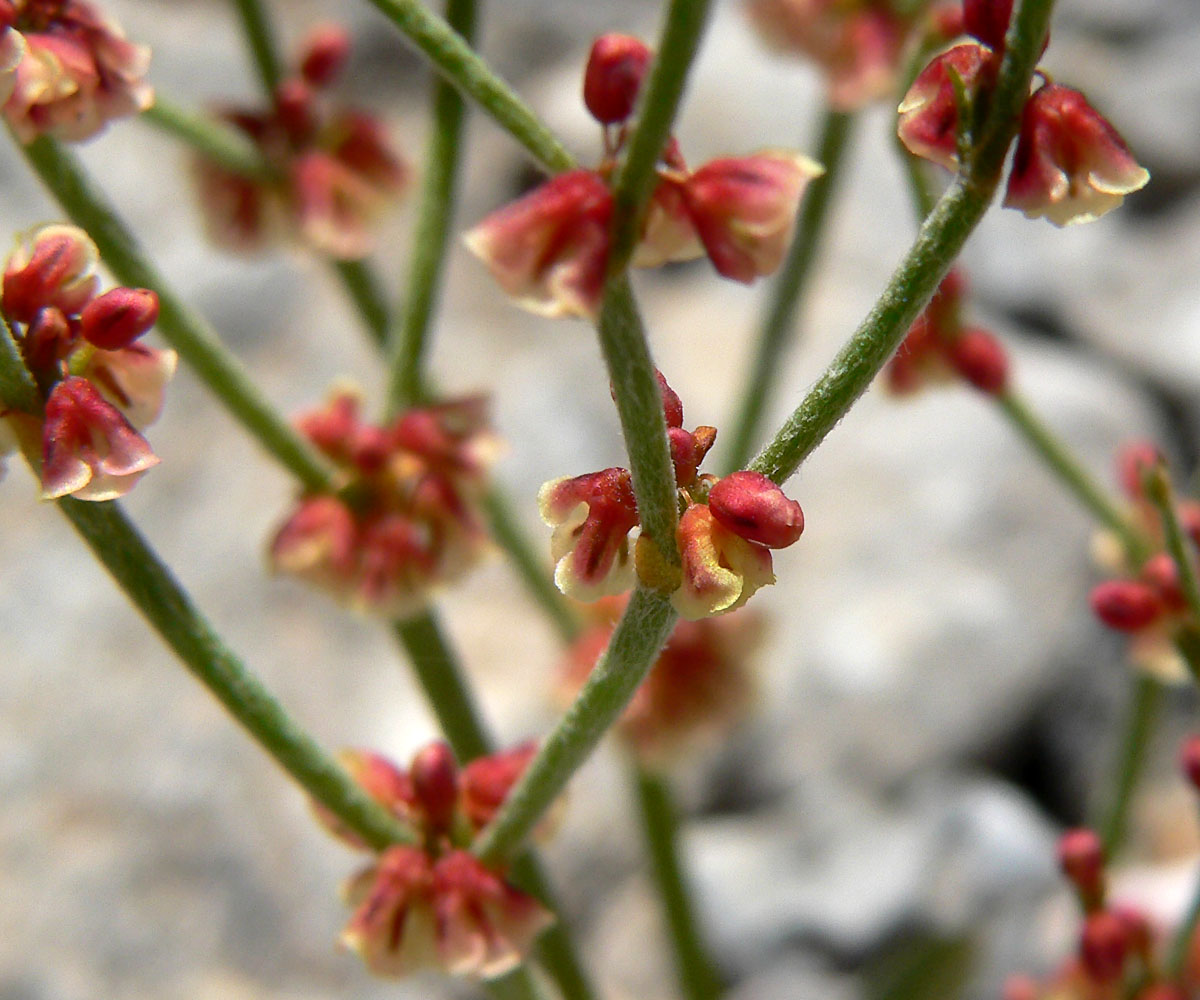
Eriogonum nidularium

- Eriogonum kennedyi – Kennedy's buckwheat
- Eriogonum latens – Inyo buckwheat
- Eriogonum latifolium – seaside buckwheat
- Eriogonum libertini – Dubakella Mountain buckwheat
- Eriogonum lobbii – Lobb's buckwheat
- Eriogonum longifolium – longleaf buckwheat
  - Eriogonum longifolium var. harperi – Harper's umbrella plant or Harper's buckwheat
  - Eriogonum longifolium var. gnaphalifolium – scrub buckwheat or long-leaf wild Buckwheat
  - Eriogonum longifolium var. longifolium – longleaf buckwheat
  - Eriogonum longifolium var. lindheimeri – Lindheimer's long-leaf Eriogonum or Lindheimer's buckwheat

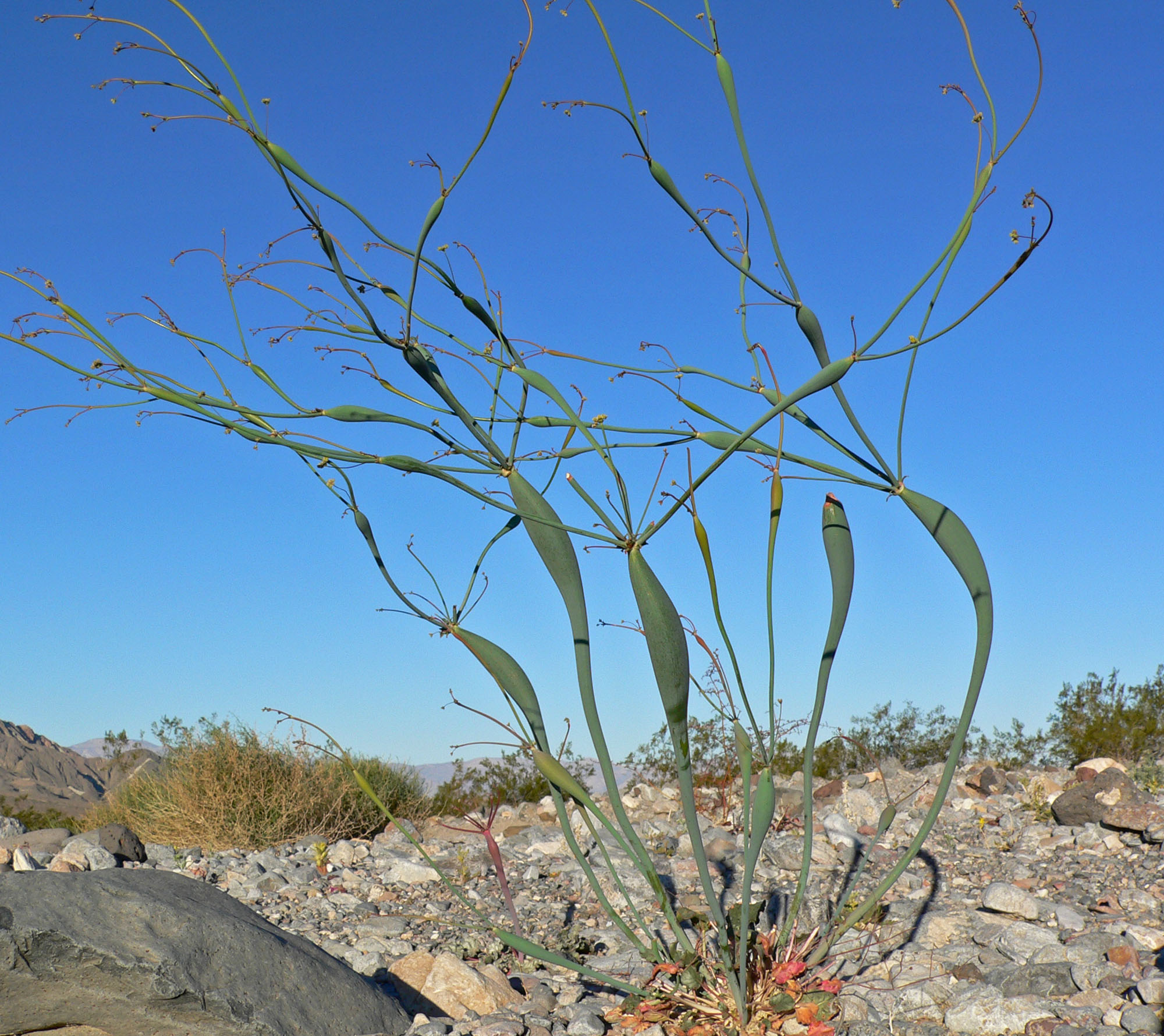
Eriogonum inflatum

- Eriogonum luteolum – goldencarpet buckwheat
- Eriogonum maculatum – spotted buckwheat
- Eriogonum marifolium – marumleaf buckwheat
- Eriogonum microthecum – slender buckwheat
- Eriogonum mohavense – Western Mojave buckwheat
- Eriogonum molestum – pineland buckwheat
- Eriogonum multiflorum - heart-sepal wild buckwheat
- Eriogonum nervulosum – Snow Mountain buckwheat
- Eriogonum nidularium – birdnest buckwheat
- Eriogonum niveum – snow buckwheat
- Eriogonum nortonii – pinnacles buckwheat
- Eriogonum nudum – naked buckwheat
  - Eriogonum nudum ssp. auriculatum

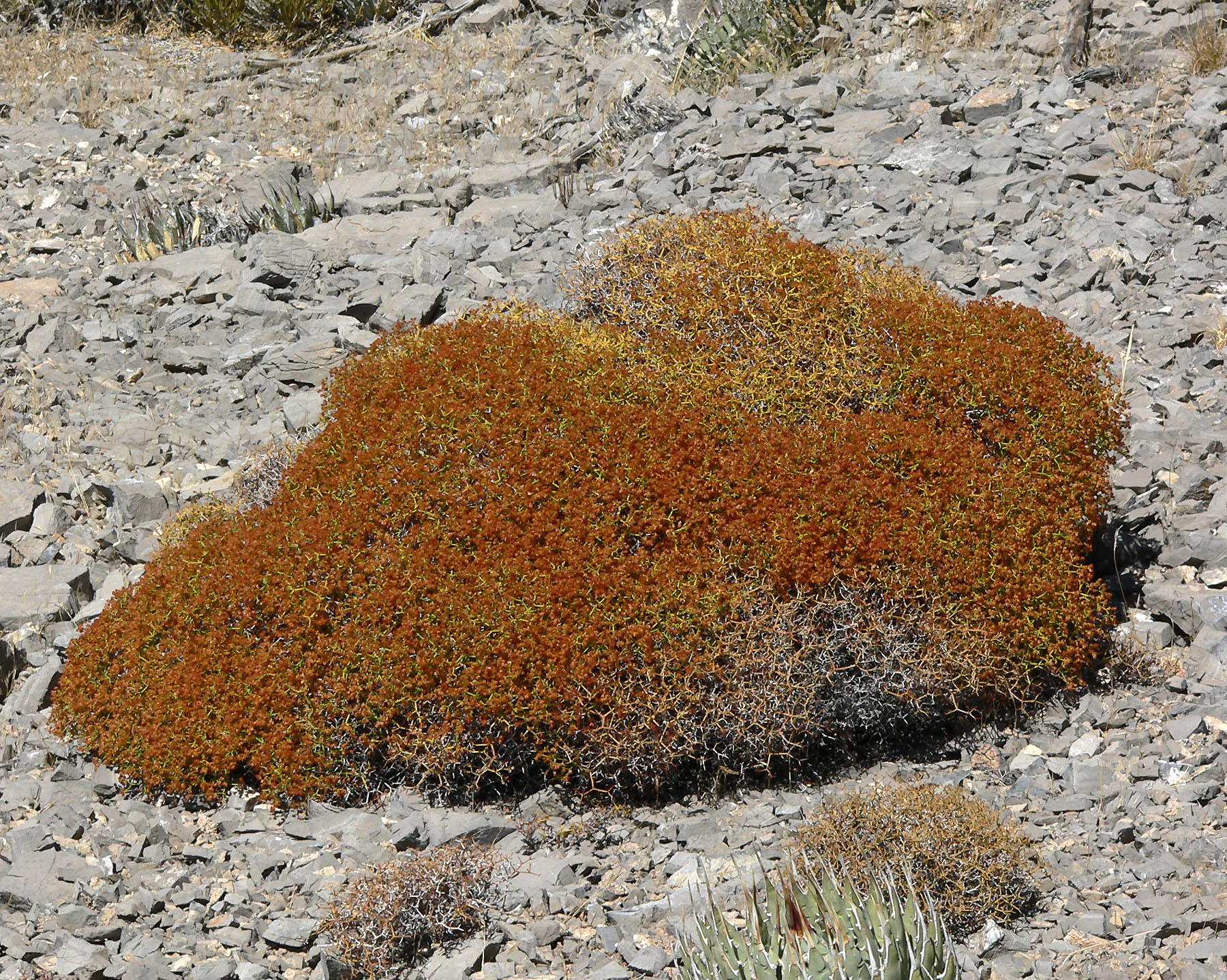
Eriogonum heermannii

- Eriogonum nummulare – Kearney buckwheat, money buckwheat
- Eriogonum ochrocephalum – whitewoolly buckwheat
- Eriogonum ovalifolium – cushion buckwheat, oval-leaf buckwheat
- Eriogonum palmerianum – Palmer's buckwheat
- Eriogonum panamintense – Panamint Mountain buckwheat
- Eriogonum parishii – mountainmist
- Eriogonum parvifolium – coast buckwheat, dune buckwheat or cliff buckwheat
- Eriogonum pauciflorum – Fewflower buckwheat
- Eriogonum pelinophilum – clay-loving wild buckwheat
- Eriogonum pendulum – waldo buckwheat
- Eriogonum plumatella – yucca buckwheat
- Eriogonum prattenianum – Nevada City buckwheat
- Eriogonum prociduum – prostrate buckwheat

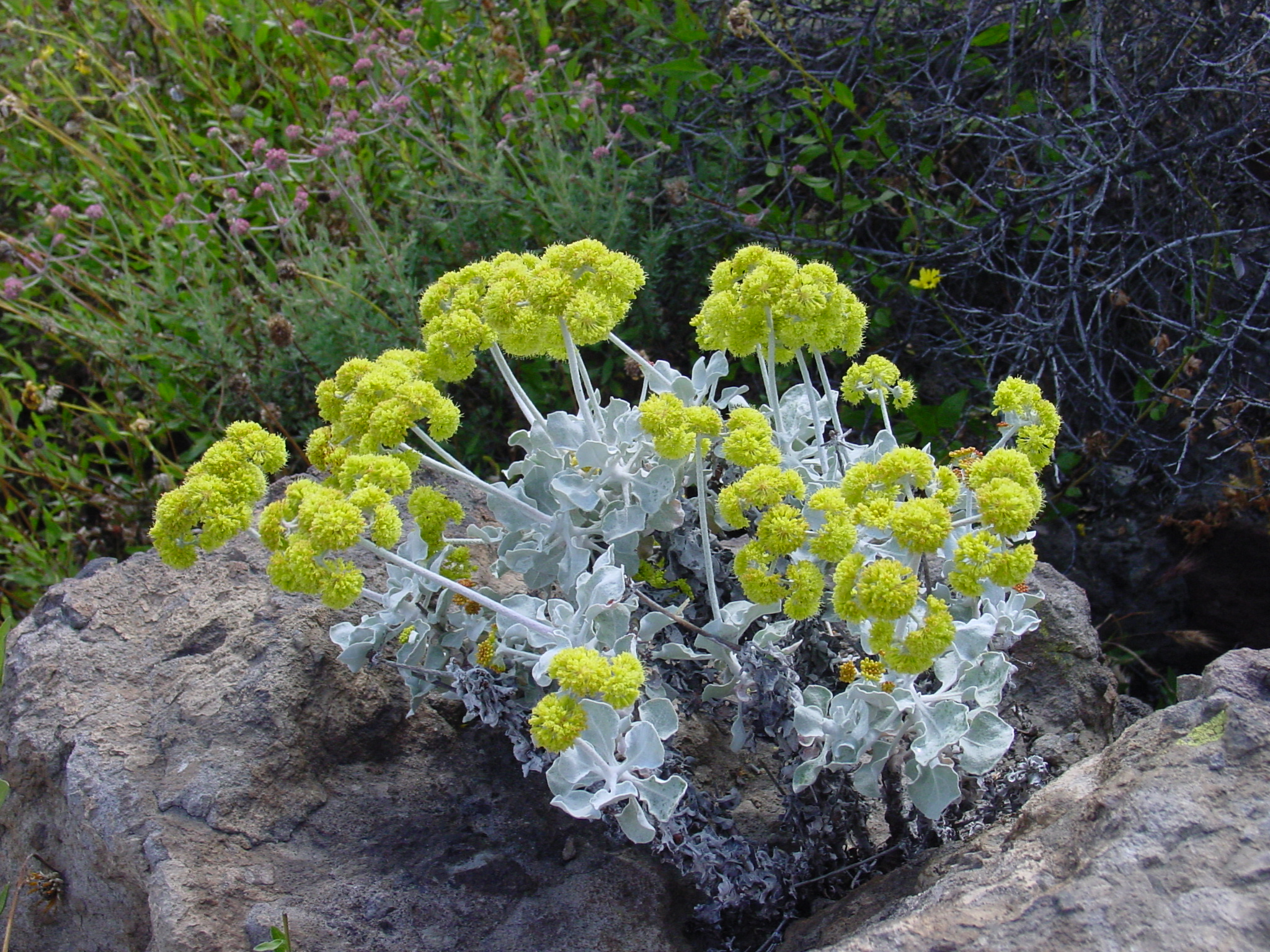
Eriogonum crocatum

- Eriogonum pusillum – yellowturbans
- Eriogonum pyrolifolium – pyrola-leaved buckwheat
- Eriogonum reniforme – kidneyleaf buckwheat
- Eriogonum rixfordii – pagoda buckwheat
- Eriogonum rosense – rosy buckwheat, mountain rose buckwheat
  - Eriogonum rosense var. beatleyae – Beatley's buckwheat
- Eriogonum roseum – wand buckwheat
- Eriogonum salicornioides – glasswort buckwheat
- Eriogonum saxatile – hoary buckwheat
- Eriogonum shockleyi – cowpie buckwheat

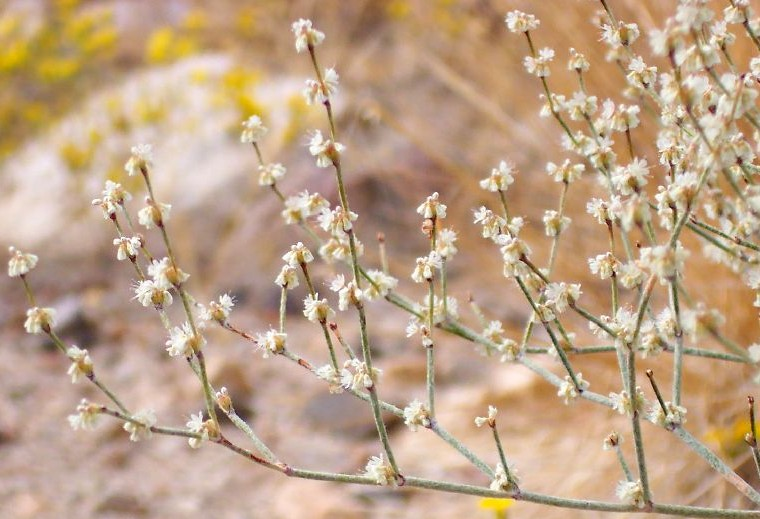
Eriogonum baileyi

- Eriogonum siskiyouense – Siskiyou buckwheat
- Eriogonum soredium – Frisco buckwheat
- Eriogonum spectabile – Barron's buckwheat
- Eriogonum spergulinum – spurry buckwheat
- Eriogonum sphaerocephalum – rock buckwheat
- Eriogonum strictum – blue mountain buckwheat
- Eriogonum ternatum – ternate buckwheat
- Eriogonum tiehmii – Tiehm's buckwheat
- Eriogonum thomasii – Thomas' buckwheat
- Eriogonum thurberi – Thurber's buckwheat
- Eriogonum thymoides – thymeleaf buckwheat
- Eriogonum tomentosum – dogtongue wild buckwheat
- Eriogonum trichopes – little desert trumpet

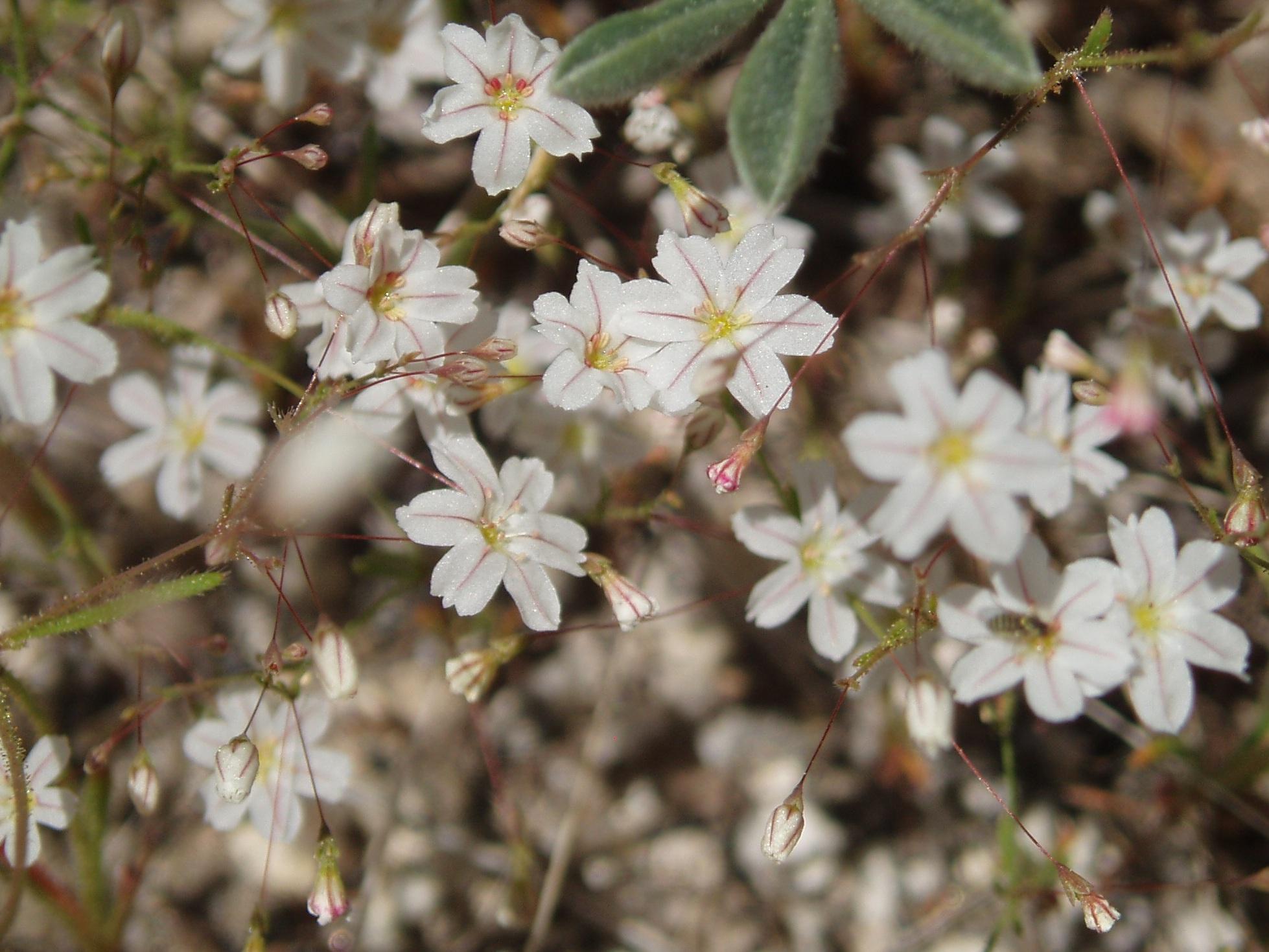
Eriogonum spergulinum

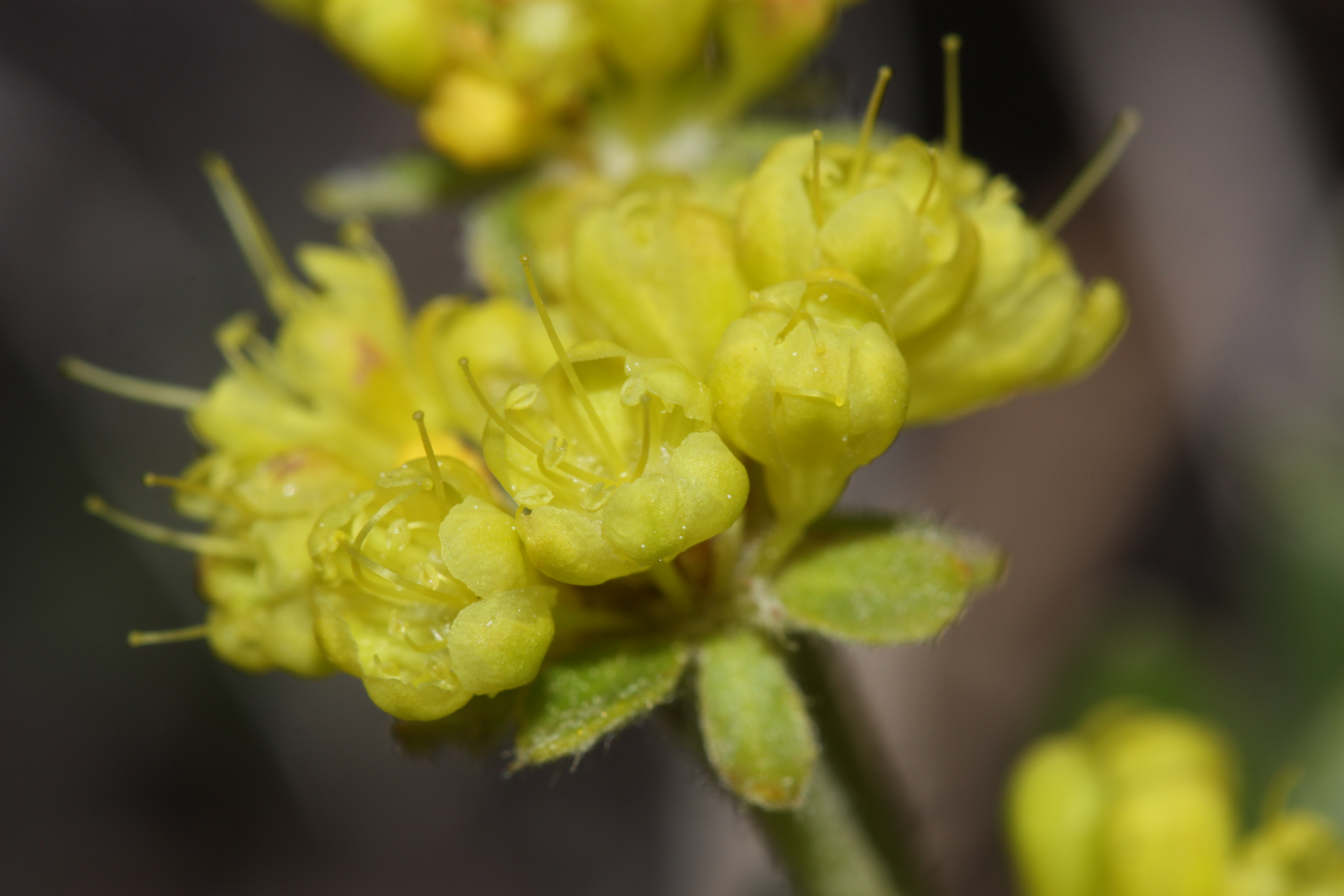
Eriogonum umbellatum

- Eriogonum tripodum – tripod buckwheat
- Eriogonum truncatum – Mount Diablo buckwheat
- Eriogonum umbellatum – sulphurflower buckwheat
- Eriogonum ursinum – talus buckwheat, Bear Valley buckwheat
- Eriogonum vimineum – wickerstem buckwheat
- Eriogonum viridescens – twotooth buckwheat
- Eriogonum visheri – Dakota wild buckwheat, Visher's buckwheat
- Eriogonum wrightii – bastardsage
- Eriogonum zapatoense
- Eriogonum zionis – Zion buckwheat
