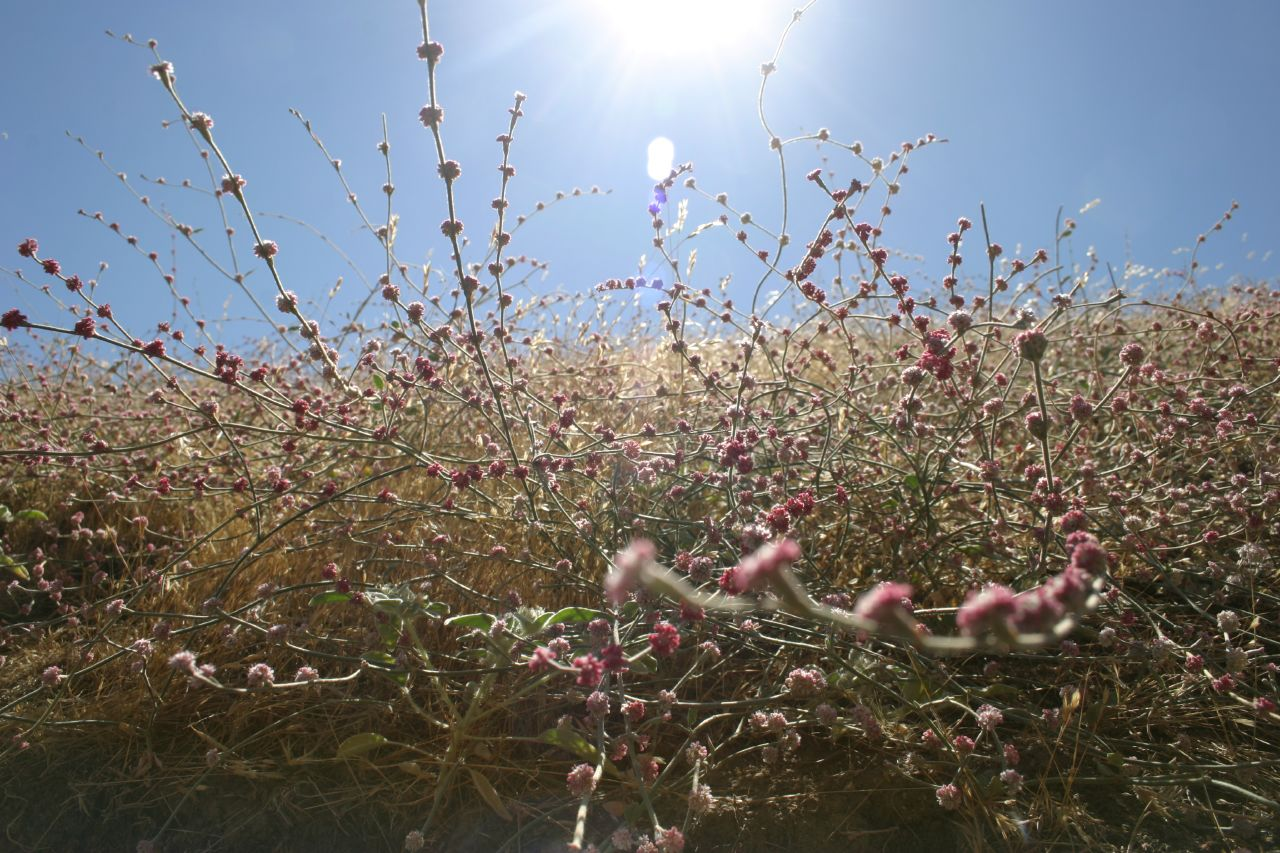

Scientific classification
- Kingdom: Plantae
- Clade: Tracheophytes
- Clade: Angiosperms
- Clade: Eudicots
- Order: Caryophyllales
- Family: Polygonaceae
- Genus: Eriogonum
- Species: E. roseum

Binomial name
- Eriogonum roseum Durand & Hilg.

Synonyms
- Eriogonum virgatum

= Eriogonum roseum =

Species of wild buckwheat

Eriogonum roseum is a species of wild buckwheat known by the common name wand buckwheat. It is native to much of western California and the Sierra Nevada foothills, as well as parts of Oregon, and it is widespread and common in several plant communities.

== Description ==
Eriogonum roseum is an erect annual herb reaching maximum heights of well over half a meter (2 feet). Small oval leaves are located at the base of the plant and the inflorescence is slender and has few erect branches.

Flower clusters are located at nodes evenly spaced along the wandlike branches. The flowers are white or shades of yellow, pink, or both.
