= Klamath Mountains (ecoregion) =

Temperate coniferous forests ecoregion in northern California and southwestern Oregon

Klamath Mountains Klamath-Siskiyou forests
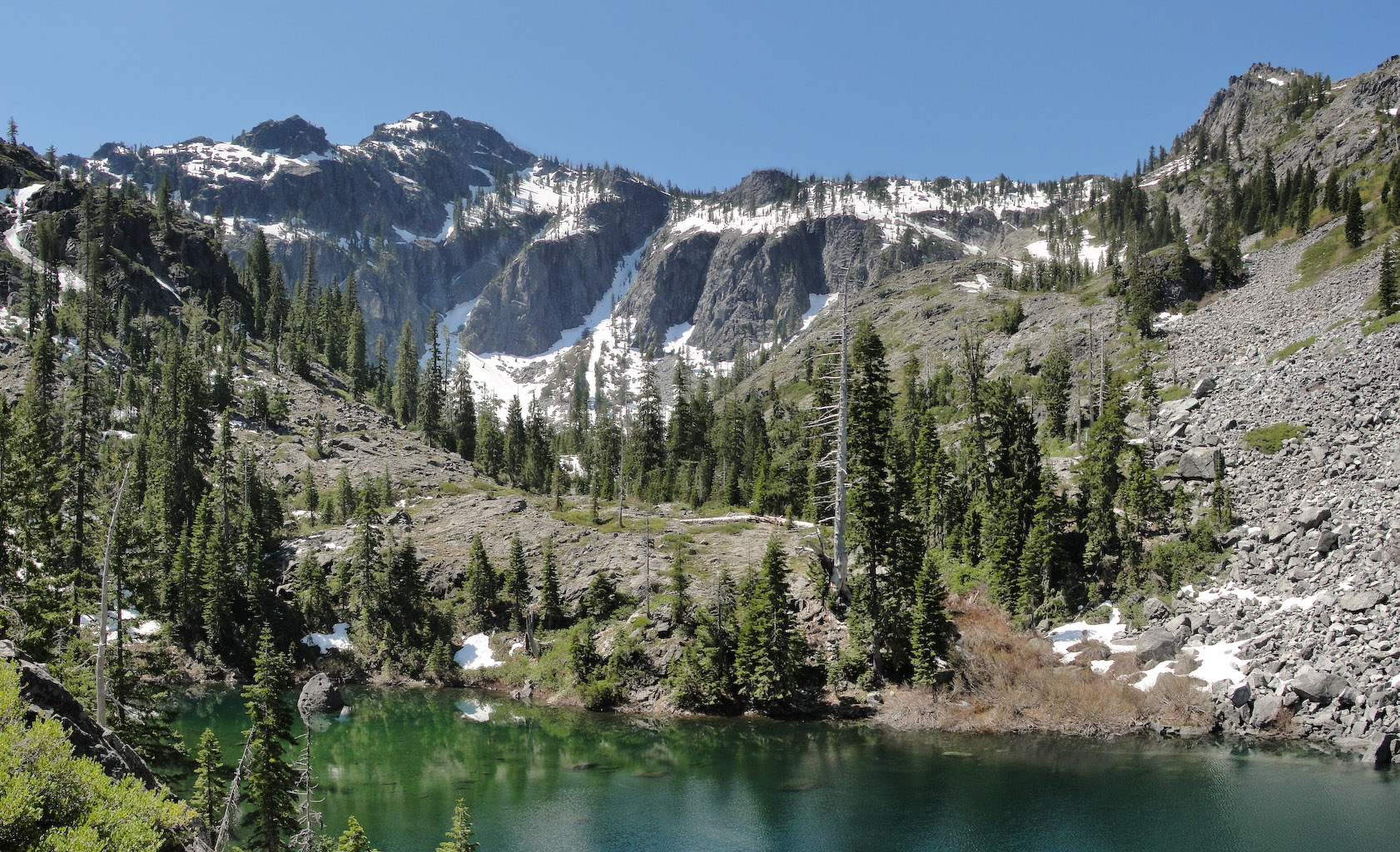
- Bear Mountain in the Siskiyou Wilderness of California

Ecology
- Realm: Nearctic
- Biome: Temperate coniferous forests
- Borders: List: California interior chaparral and woodlands; Cascades; Central Pacific coastal forests; Eastern Cascades Slopes and Foothills; Sierra Nevada; Willamette Valley
- Bird species: 220
- Mammal species: 87

Geography
- Area: 50,245 km^{2} (19,400 mi^{2})
- Country: United States
- States: California; Oregon
- Coordinates: 41°30′N 123°18′W

Conservation
- Conservation status: Critical/Endangered
- Global 200: Yes
- Habitat loss: 4.4045%
- Protected: 56.99%

The Klamath Mountains ecoregion of Oregon and California lies inland and north of the Coast Range ecoregion, extending from the Umpqua River in the north to the Sacramento Valley in the south. It encompasses the highly dissected ridges, foothills, and valleys of the Klamath and Siskiyou Mountains. It corresponds to the Level III ecoregion designated by the Environmental Protection Agency and to the Klamath-Siskiyou forests ecoregion designated by the World Wide Fund for Nature.

The ecoregion is also a geomorphic province and was unglaciated during the Pleistocene epoch, when it served as a refuge for northern plant species. Its mix of granitic, sedimentary, metamorphic, and extrusive rocks contrasts with the predominantly volcanic rocks of the Cascades ecoregion to the northeast. The mild, subhumid climate of the region is characterized by a lengthy summer drought. It supports a mosaic of both northern Californian and Pacific Northwestern conifers and hardwoods.

== Ecology ==
=== Flora ===
The ecoregion harbors rich biodiversity, with several distinct plant communities, including temperate rain forests, moist inland forests, oak forests and savannas, high elevation forests, and alpine grasslands. Thirty conifer species inhabit the region, including seven endemic species, making the region one of the richest coniferous forest regions of the world in species diversity. The region also has several edaphic plant communities (adapted to specific soil types), notably those of the region's serpentine outcrops.

Temperate rain forests grow near the coast and are dominated by the conifers coast Douglas-fir (Pseudotsuga menziesii subsp. menziesii), western hemlock (Tsuga heterophylla), Sitka spruce (Picea sitchensis), Grand fir, coast redwood (Sequoia sempervirens), Lawson's cypress (also known as Port Orford Cedar, Chamaecyparis lawsoniana), Pacific yew (Taxus brevifolia) and broadleaf Pacific madrone, bigleaf maple, Pacific rhododendron, California laurel, and tanoak.

Inland forests are dominated by Ponderosa pine (Pinus ponderosa), Sugar pine (Pinus lambertiana), Jeffrey pine (Pinus jeffreyi), Coast Douglas-fir, white fir (Abies concolor subsp. lowiana), red fir (A. magnifica subsp. shastensis), California incense cedar (Calocedrus decurrens), Knobcone pine (Pinus attenuata), Lodgepole pine (Pinus contorta), and Oregon white oak, California black oak, tanoak and Pacific madrone. Areas with serpentine soil are dominated by Ponderosa pine (Pinus ponderosa), Jeffrey pine (P. jeffreyi), Knobcone pine (P. attenuata), Lodgepole pine (P. contorta) and various shrubs. Oak savanna and small patches of chaparral also occur. Oak savannas are dominated by Oregon white oak, California black oak, and chaparral is dominated by manzanita, ceanothus, deer brush and marks the northern extent of the range for California Buckeye.

High elevation forests are dominated by Ponderosa pine (Pinus ponderosa), sugar pine, western juniper, Mountain hemlock (Tsuga mertensiana), white fir, red fir, Pacific silver fir, Weeping spruce (Picea breweriana) and foxtail pine (Pinus balfouriana).

Several species and subspecies of plants are endemic to the ecoregion. Endemic plants which grow on serpentine soils including McDonald's rock cress (Arabis mcdonaldiana), Koehler's rock cress (Boechera koehleri), Klamath manzanita (Arctostaphylos klamathensis), Calochortus howellii, Calochortus umpquaensis, Castilleja elata, Shasta chaenactis (Chaenactis suffrutescens), Siskiyou fireweed (Epilobium siskiyouense), serpentine goldenbush (Ericameria ophitidis), Trinity buckwheat (Eriogonum alpinum), Congdon's buckwheat (Eriogonum congdonii), Klamath Mountain buckwheat (Eriogonum hirtellum), Dubakella Mountain buckwheat (Eriogonum libertini), Erythronium citrinum, Galium serpenticum subsp. scotticum, Gentiana setigera, Niles' harmonia (Harmonia doris-nilesiae), Hastingsia atropurpurea, Lomatium engelmannii, Heller's Mount Eddy lupine (Lupinus lapidicola), Kneeland Prairie pennycress (Noccaea fendleri subsp. californica), thread-leaved beardtongue (Penstemon filiformis), Perideridia erythrorhiza, Scott Valley phacelia (Phacelia greenei), Phacelia dalesiana, Siskiyou phacelia (Phacelia leonis), Yreka phlox (Phlox hirsuta), crested potentilla (Potentilla cristae), Potentilla pickeringii, showy raillardella (Raillardella pringlei), peanut sandwort (Sabulina rosei), Sedum moranii, salmon-flowered catchfly (Silene salmonacea), serpentine catchfly (Silene serpentinicola), and western white bog violet (Viola primulifolia var. occidentalis). Other endemic species include the Del Norte willow (Salix delnortensis) and Brewer spruce (Picea breweriana).

== Level IV ecoregions ==
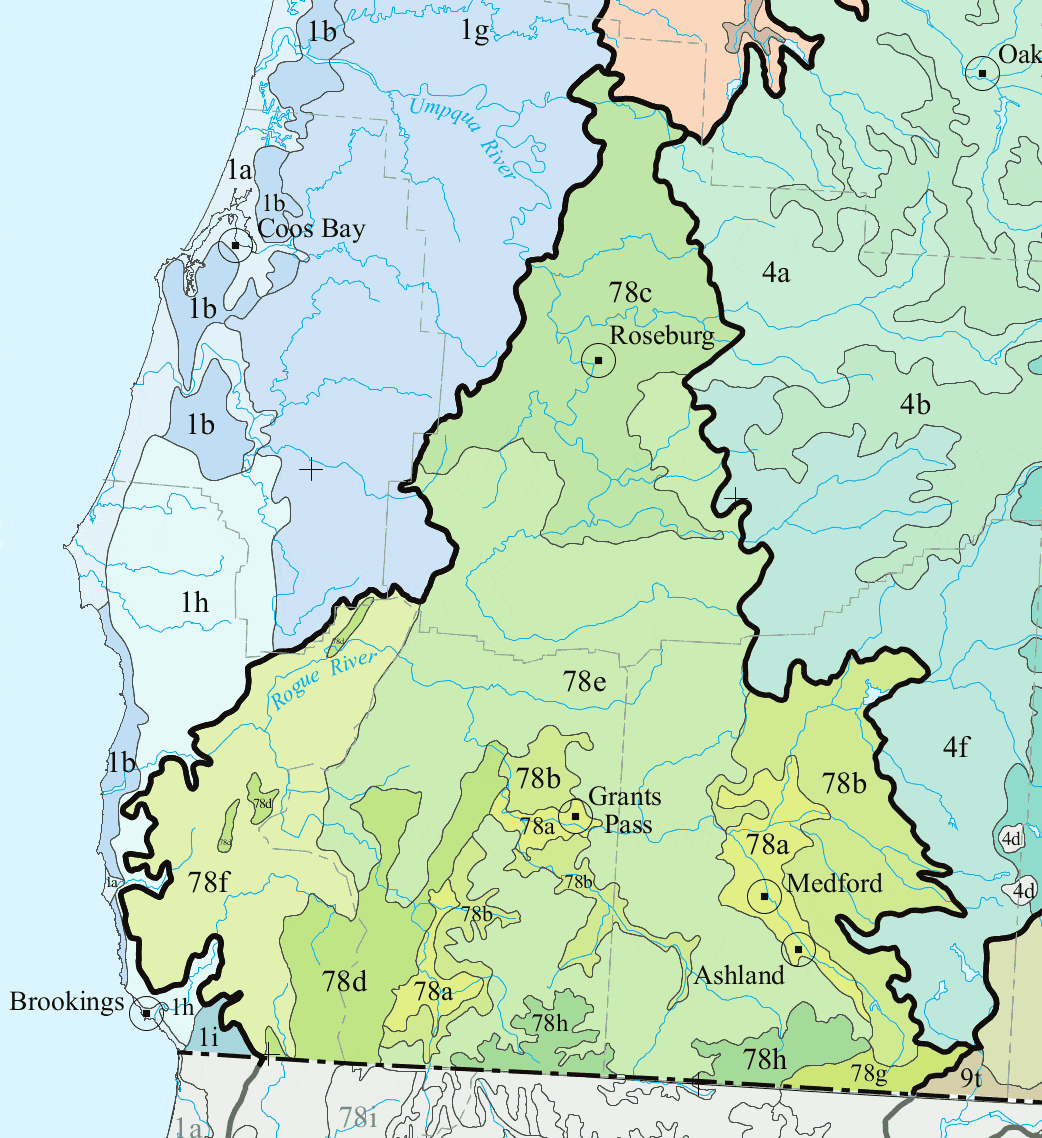
Klamath Mountains ecoregion in Oregon

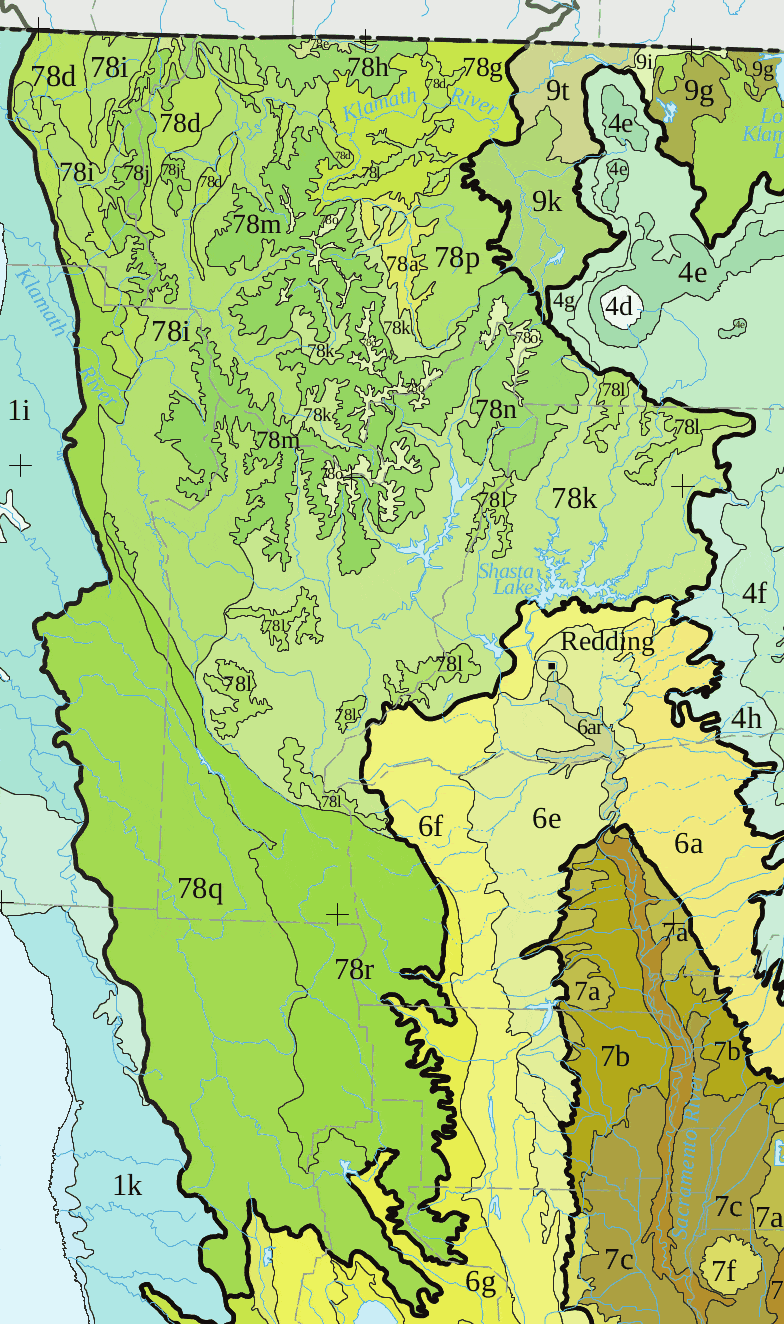
Klamath Mountains ecoregion in California

The ecoregion has been subdivided into Level IV ecoregions, as described below.

=== Rogue/Illinois Valleys (78a) ===
The Rogue/Illinois Valleys ecoregion includes terraces and floodplains in the Rogue and Illinois river valleys at an elevation of 900 to 2,000 feet (274 to 610 m). Historically, the valleys supported Oregon white oak and California black oak woodland, with Pacific madrone, Ponderosa pine, and grassland. Common understory plants included California fescue, snowberry, and serviceberry. Riparian areas supported willow and cottonwood. Much of the land has been developed for agricultural or residential use, and little of the original vegetation remains. Remnants of oak savanna, prairie vegetation, and seasonal ponds persist on the mesa tops of the Table Rocks north of Medford. Elsewhere, land uses include orchards, cropland, and pastureland. Climate, vegetation, and resulting land use are more similar to Northern California’s inland valleys than to the Willamette Valley ecoregion to the north. The region covers 285 square miles (738 km^{2}) in Oregon, in three separate areas around Medford and Ashland, Grants Pass, and Cave Junction.

=== Oak Savanna Foothills (78b) ===
The Oak Savanna Foothills ecoregion consists of moderately sloping mountain foothills bordering the Rogue and Illinois river valleys and sharing their Mediterranean climate. Elevation varies from 1,400 to 4,000 feet (427 to 1,219 m). The driest area, east of Medford, is dominated by Oregon white oak and California black oak woodlands, grassland-savanna, ponderosa pine, and Coast Douglas-fir. The wetter foothills flanking the Illinois Valley support Coast douglas-fir, pacific madrone, and California incense-cedar. Understory species include oceanspray, Western poison-oak, snowberry, Idaho fescue, California brome, roughstalk bluegrass, and ceanothus. The region is lower and less dissected, with more oak woodland and less closed-canopied forest than the Inland Siskiyous. It covers 818 square miles (2,119 km^{2}) in Oregon.

=== Umpqua Interior Foothills (78c) ===
The Umpqua Interior Foothills ecoregion is a complex of foothills and narrow valleys containing fluvial terraces and floodplains. Elevation varies from 400 to 2,800 feet (122 to 853 m). It is drier than the foothills of the Willamette Valley, partly because the summer Pacific high pressure system arrives earlier and remains longer than in ecoregions to the north. Summers are hot and dry, and soils have a xeric moisture regime in contrast to the udic soils of the Mid-Coastal Sedimentary ecoregion to the west. The slopes are covered by Oregon white oak woodland, Coast douglas-fir, grand fir, ponderosa pine, pacific madrone, tanoak, and chinquapin, with an understory chaparral community that includes snowberry, salal, Oregon grape, poison oak, oceanspray, and swordfern. Many areas have been converted to pastureland, vineyards, orchards, and row crops. It covers 921 square miles (2,385 km^{2}) in Oregon in the Umpqua Valley, including the city of Roseburg.

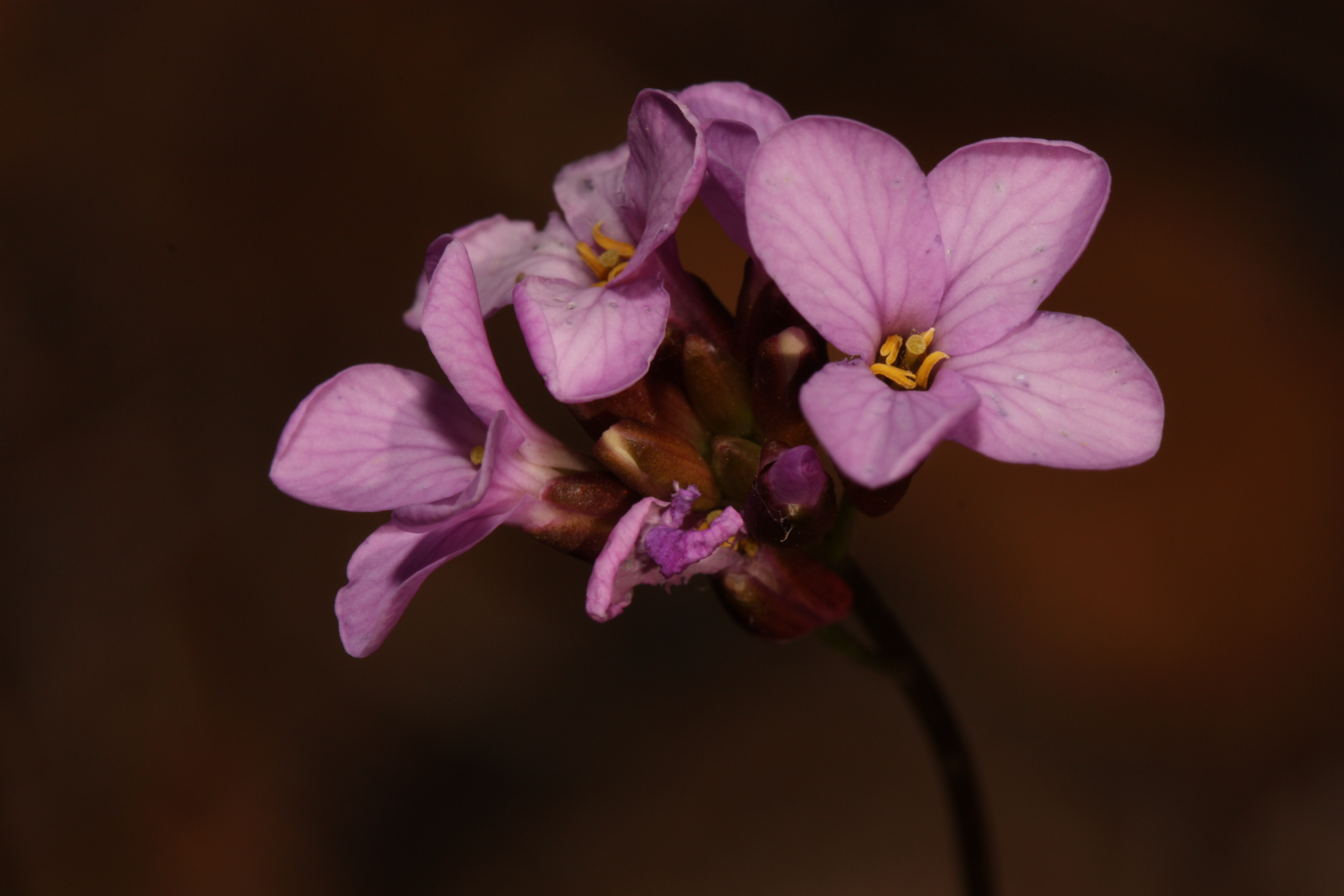
Waldo rockcress is an uncommon endemic member of the serpentine soils flora of the Serpentine Siskiyous.

=== Serpentine Siskiyous (78d) ===
The Serpentine Siskiyous ecoregion consists of highly dissected mountains containing perennial, high gradient streams at an elevation of 1,500 to 4,300 feet (457 to 1,311 m). It is lithogically distinct from the rest of the Klamath Mountains ecoregion. Many plants have difficulty growing in its serpentine soils due to a shortage of calcium and high levels of magnesium, nickel, and chromium. As a result, vegetation is often sparse and composed of specialist species that have evolved to grow in the potentially toxic and nutrient-poor serpentine soils. It supports a mixed conifer forest of Jeffrey pine, tanoak, california incense-cedar, Coast douglas-fir, and montane chaparral composed of manzanita, ceanothus, Idaho fescue, and Lemmon needlegrass. Historic gold, nickel, chromite, copper, and mercury mining have contributed to water quality problems. The region covers 440 square miles (1,140 km^{2}) in Oregon, including portions of the Rogue River – Siskiyou National Forest and the Kalmiopsis and Wild Rogue wildernesses.

=== Inland Siskiyous (78e) ===
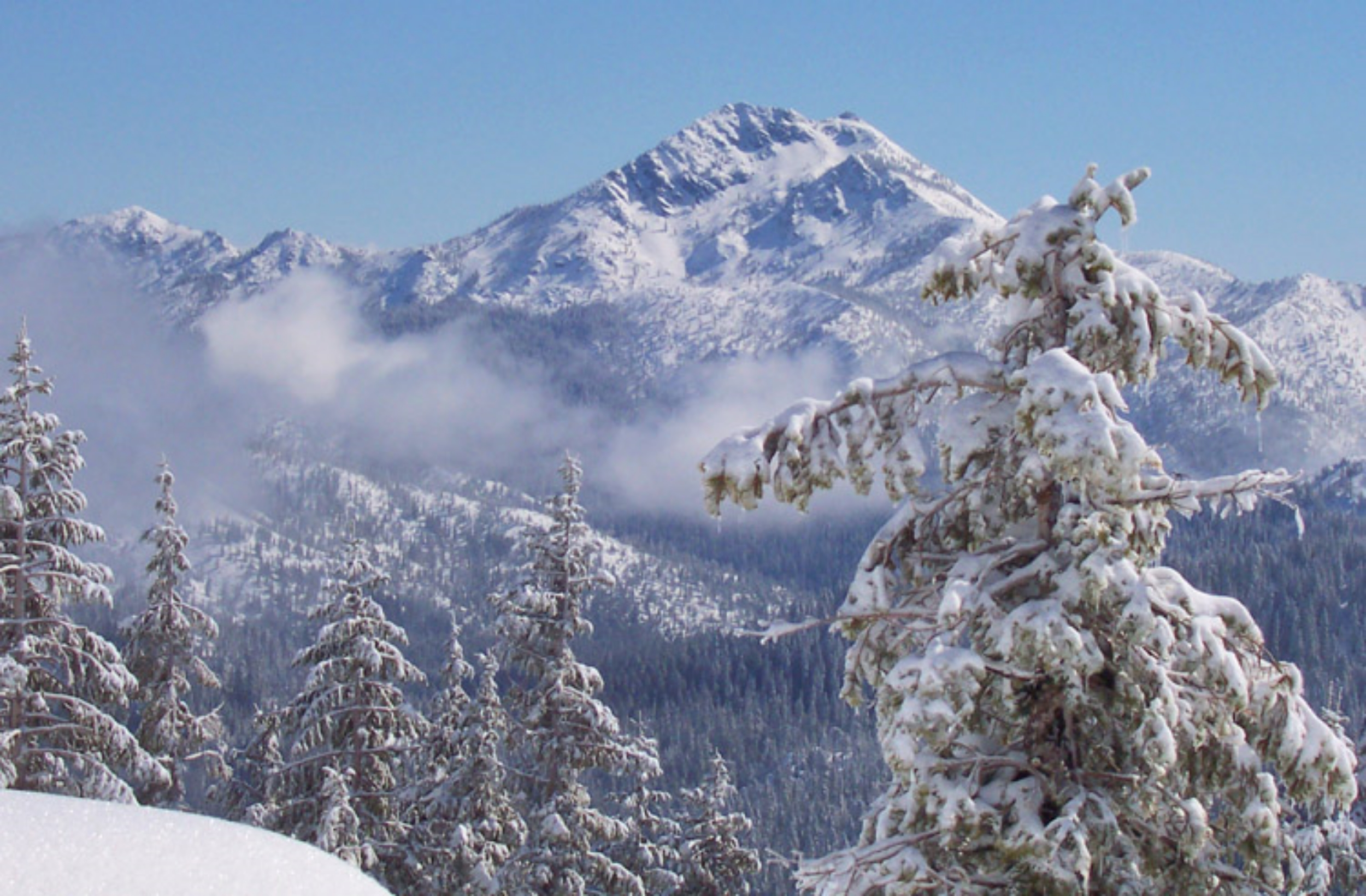
Preston Peak, Siskiyou Wilderness

The Inland Siskiyous ecoregion is higher and more mountainous than the neighboring foothill and valley ecoregions, with an elevation of 800 to 7,000 feet (244 to 2,134 m). It has a higher fire frequency, less annual precipitation, and longer summer droughts than the Coastal Siskiyous. Forest cover is a diverse and multi-layered mix of conifers, broadleaf evergreens, and deciduous trees and shrubs, featuring coast douglas-fir, ponderosa pine, sugar pine, Oregon white oak, California black oak, Pacific madrone, serviceberry, snowberry, Oregon grape, California fescue, and Pacific poison oak. The largest of the Klamath Mountains subregions mapped so far, it covers 2,610 square miles (6,760 km^{2}) in Oregon, including public lands within the Rogue River – Siskiyou National Forest.

=== Coastal Siskiyous (78f) ===
The Coastal Siskiyous ecoregion consists of highly dissected mountains with a wetter and milder maritime climate than elsewhere in the Klamath Mountains ecoregion. Elevation varies from 600 to 5,300 feet (183 to 1,615 m). Productive forests composed of Tanoak, Coast douglas-fir, Coast redwood, bigleaf maple, California laurel, and some Port Orford cedar and Nootka cypress cover its mountainous landscape, with chinqupin, salal, pacific rhododendron, and western swordfern; tanoak is more common than elsewhere in Oregon. Broadleaf evergreens, such as tanoak and pacific madrone, quickly colonize disturbed areas, making it difficult to regenerate conifer forest growth. Xeric soils derived from Siskiyou rock types are characteristic; udic soils which support western hemlock, Sitka spruce and Western red cedar are present but are less common than in the wetter Coast Range ecoregion to the west. The region covers 853 square miles (2,209 km^{2}) in Oregon, including portions of the Rogue River – Siskiyou National Forest and the Kalmiopsis and Wild Rogue Wilderness wildernesses.

=== Klamath River Ridges (78g) ===
The Klamath River Ridges is characterized by highly dissected mountains, with a dry, continental climate. Elevation varies from 3,800 to 7,500 feet (1,158 to 2,286 m). Vegetation varies with slope, aspect, and elevation. Higher elevations and north-facing slopes have Coast douglas-fir, white fir and red fir; lower elevations and south-facing slopes are covered in ponderosa pine and western juniper, species that are more drought-resistant than other vegetation types found within the region. The chaparral features Oregon grape, western fescue, snowberry, bluebunch wheatgrass, and ceanothus. The region covers 121 square miles (313 km^{2}) in Oregon near the Siskiyou Summit, including portions of the Rogue River – Siskiyou National Forest and the Cascade–Siskiyou National Monument.

=== Border High-Siskiyous (78h) ===
The Border High-Siskiyous ecoregion consists of relatively high elevation mountains along the border area of Oregon and California. Elevations range from about 5,000 to 7,000 feet (1,500 to 2,100 m), with a high point of 7,533 feet (2,296 m) at Mount Ashland, Oregon. White fir and Red fir forests occur, with some Jeffrey pine on ultramafic rocks, and a few areas of subalpine habitats. With a large western to eastern extent, conditions are slightly drier to the east.

=== Western Klamath Low Elevation Forests (78i) ===
The Western Klamath Low Elevation Forests ecoregion is at elevations generally less than 3,500 feet (1,100 m). Douglas-fir and Port Orford cedar occur on lower slopes, grading into Douglas-fir and tanoak, or higher areas with canyon live oak. Red and white alder are typical along streams. Mixed oak stands occur on drier sites. The ecoregion generally is wetter and has a somewhat denser forest landscape than the drier Ecoregion 78k to the east.

=== Western Klamath Montane Forests (78j) ===
The Western Klamath Montane Forests ecoregion generally is higher than Ecoregion 78i, with elevations typically ranging from 3,500 to 6,900 feet (1,100 to 2,100 m). Annual temperatures are cooler than in Ecoregion 78i, and precipitation is greater. The vegetation consists mostly of Douglas-fir and white fir forests, with some red fir forests at high elevations. Ecoregion 78j lacks the serpentine geology of nearby Ecoregion 78d, and is composed mostly of Mesozoic quartz diorite, with areas of Jurassic slate, graywacke, shale, and sandstone.

=== Eastern Klamath Low Elevation Forests (78k) ===
The Eastern Klamath Low Elevation Forests ecoregion is geologically and botanically diverse, and has some drier forests than ecoregion 78i to the west. Elevations generally are less than 3,500 feet (1,100 m). Forest and woodland types can include areas of Douglas-fir, ponderosa pine, canyon live oak, and knobcone pine, along with chaparral of chamise, deer brush, and manzanita. Along streams, cottonwoods, white alder, and willows occur.

=== Eastern Klamath Montane Forests (78l) ===
Typically at elevations greater than 4,000 feet (1,200 m), the Eastern Klamath Montane Forests ecoregion includes a mosaic of forest and chaparral types. It often has more open tree canopies and understories than western Klamath regions. White fir, incense cedar, Douglas-fir, ponderosa pine, and sugar pine are dominant, with mountain dogwood in the understory. Some minor areas of Shasta fir or red fir occur at high elevations. Black and canyon live oaks mix with scattered conifers on drier sites, with understories of huckleberry oak and other chaparral species.

=== Marble/Salmon Mountains-Trinity Alps (78m) ===
The Marble/Salmon Mountains-Trinity Alps ecoregion includes the Salmon Mountains, Marble Mountains, and Trinity Alps in the montane elevations from 3,500 to 7,000 ft (1,100 to 2,100 m). The rugged region has steep slopes and numerous canyons and narrow mountain valleys. Granitic, metavolcanic, and metasedimentary rocks occur, including some areas of serpentinized peridotite. The climate is colder than surrounding lower elevation ecoregions 78g, 78i, and 78k. Forests include Douglas-fir, white fir, and at high elevations, red fir.

=== Scott Mountains (78n) ===
The Scott Mountains ecoregion is dominated by ultramafic rocks with Mesozoic mafic intrusions, along with some granitic rocks near the Trinity Alps and at Castle Crags. Elevations generally range from 3,000 to 7,000 ft (910 to 2,130 m). Ecoregion 78n has more ultramaficrocks and less precipitation than Ecoregion 78m to the west. Vegetation includes Jeffrey pine, mixed conifer, and white fir. The ecoregion drains to the Trinity, Sacramento, Scott, and Shasta Rivers.

=== Klamath Subalpine (78o) ===
The Klamath Subalpine ecoregion is higher, wetter, and colder than surrounding areas, with elevations generally greater than 6,800 feet (2,100 m). Most of the region was glaciated, shown by the numerous cirques, moraines, and other glacial features. Shasta red fir, mountain hemlock, and some western white pine occur, as well as subalpine meadows with various mixes of shrubs, herbs, and grasses. Some foxtail pine occurs as well as small areas of Pacific silver fir to the north. Soils tend to be thin and rocky, across various bedrock types including granitics, gabbro, and ultramafic rocks. Soils deepen downslope.

=== Duzel Rock (78p) ===
The Duzel Rock ecoregion is slightly lower in elevation with less relief than Klamath Mountain ecoregions immediately north or south, and it has more juniper and big sagebrush, along with scattered woodland. Ponderosa pine, Oregon white oak, and areas of Jeffrey pine occur. Some Douglas-fir is found at higher elevations and on northern slopes. Curl-leaf mountain mahogany is common in the western and southern parts. The geology is mostly Cambrian through Devonian metasedimentary and minor metavolcanic rocks including metamorphosed conglomerate, sandstone, shale, chert, limestone, and basalt. The region drains to the Scott and Shasta Rivers.

== See also ==
- Ecoregions defined by the Environmental Protection Agency and the Commission for Environmental Cooperation:
  - List of ecoregions in North America (CEC)
  - List of ecoregions in the United States (EPA)
  - List of ecoregions in Oregon
  - List of ecoregions in California
- The conservation group World Wildlife Fund maintains an alternate classification system:
  - List of ecoregions (WWF)
  - List of ecoregions in the United States (WWF)
