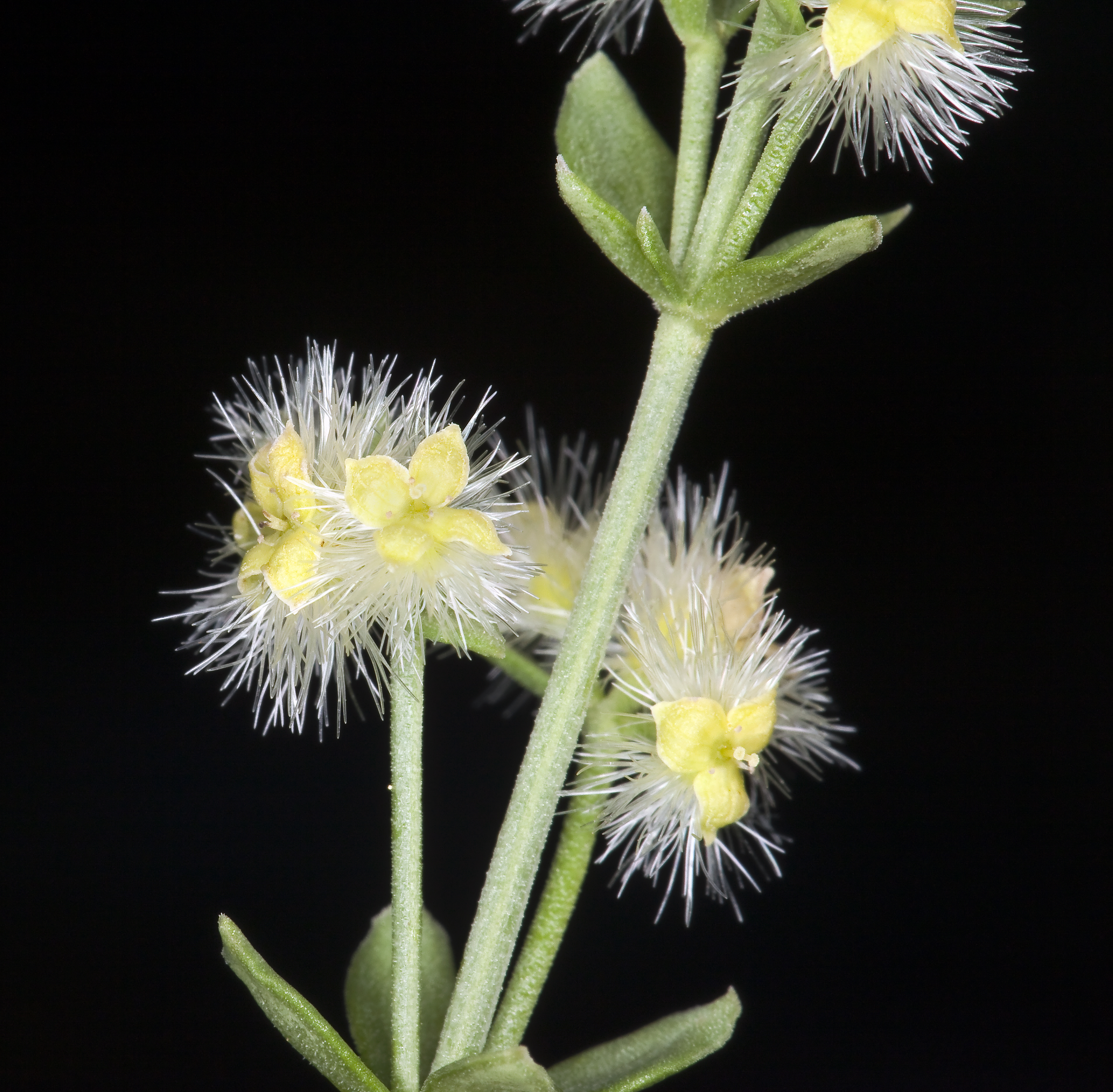
- female flower

Scientific classification
- Kingdom: Plantae
- Clade: Tracheophytes
- Clade: Angiosperms
- Clade: Eudicots
- Clade: Asterids
- Order: Gentianales
- Family: Rubiaceae
- Genus: Galium
- Species: G. serpenticum

Binomial name
- Galium serpenticum Dempster

= Galium serpenticum =

Species of plant

Galium serpenticum is a species of flowering plant in the coffee family (Rubiaceae) known by the common name intermountain bedstraw or many-flowered bedstraw.

== Range ==
Galium serpenticum is native to the northwestern United States, where it grows in dry mountain forests and meadows, mostly east of the crest of the Cascade Range. It occurs in Washington, Oregon, Idaho and extreme northern California (Trinity, Siskiyou and Modoc Counties). In the Wenatchee Mountains it is sometimes found on serpentine soils.

== Description ==
Galium serpenticum is a perennial herb forming tufts of erect stems up to about 30 centimeters tall with woody bases. The stems are ringed with whorls of four lance-shaped leaves and topped with inflorescences made up of clusters of small pale yellow to whitish flowers. It is dioecious, with male and female flowers on separate plants. Male and female flowers both have 4 small pale yellow to yellow-green petals, and female flowers have a prominent tuft of long spreading hairs protruding beneath the petals.

== Subspecies ==
Nine subspecies are currently recognized (May 2014):

- Galium serpenticum subsp. dayense Dempster & Ehrend. - Oregon
- Galium serpenticum subsp. malheurense Dempster & Ehrend - Oregon (Harney + Malheur Counties)
- Galium serpenticum subsp. okanoganense Dempster & Ehrend - northeastern Washington
- Galium serpenticum subsp. puberulum (Piper) Dempster & Ehrend. - Cleman Mountain in Yakima County Washington
- Galium serpenticum subsp. scabridum (Ehrend.) Dempster & Ehrend. - central Washington
- Galium serpenticum subsp. scotticum Dempster & Ehrend. - Scott Mountains in Siskiyou County California
- Galium serpenticum subsp. serpenticum - Oregon, Nevada, and the Blue Mountains of Washington
- Galium serpenticum subsp. warnerense Dempster & Ehrend - from Lake County Oregon to Modoc County California
- Galium serpenticum subsp. wenatchicum Dempster & Ehrend. - Wenatchee Mountains of Washington

== Gallery ==
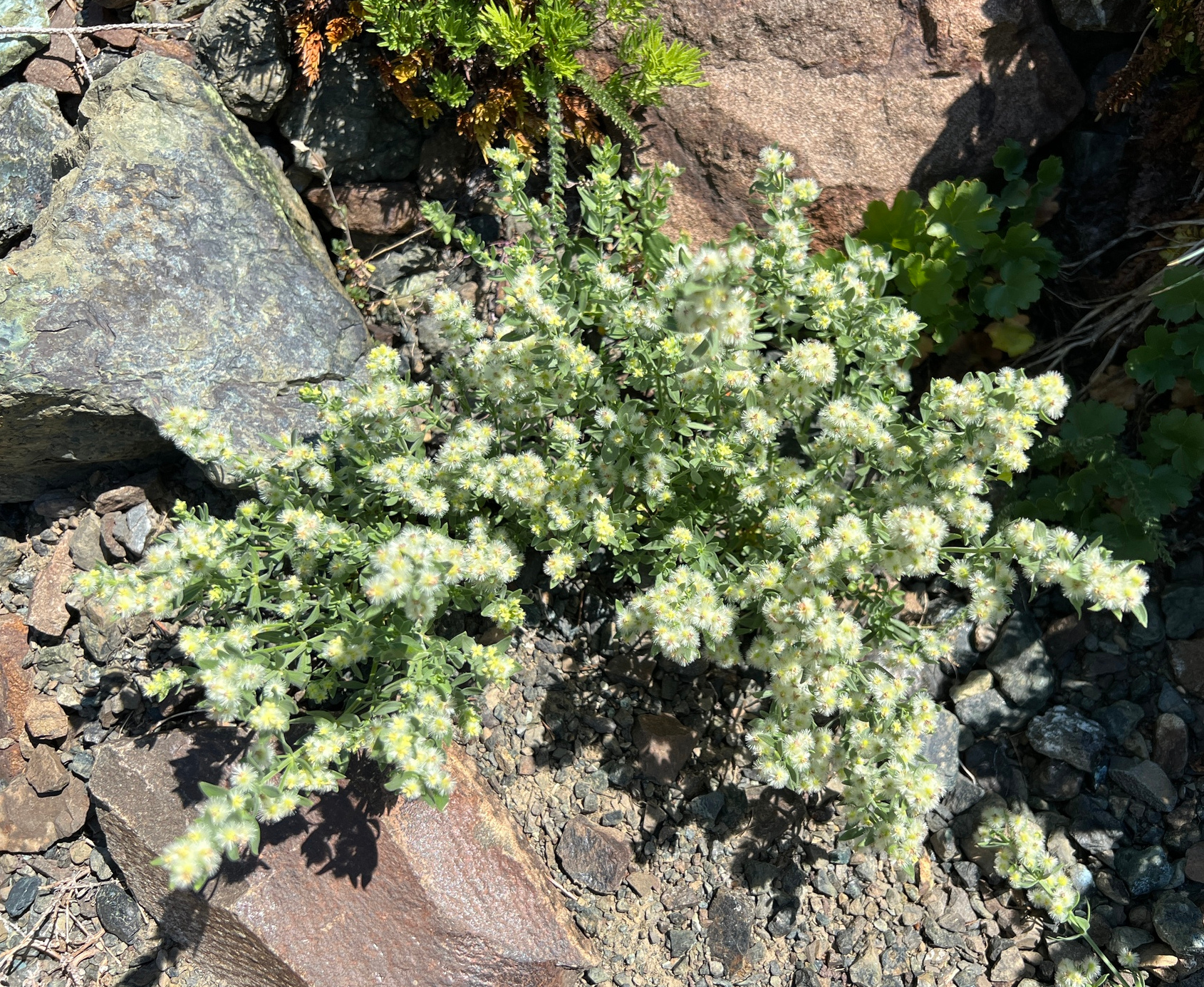
Female in flower

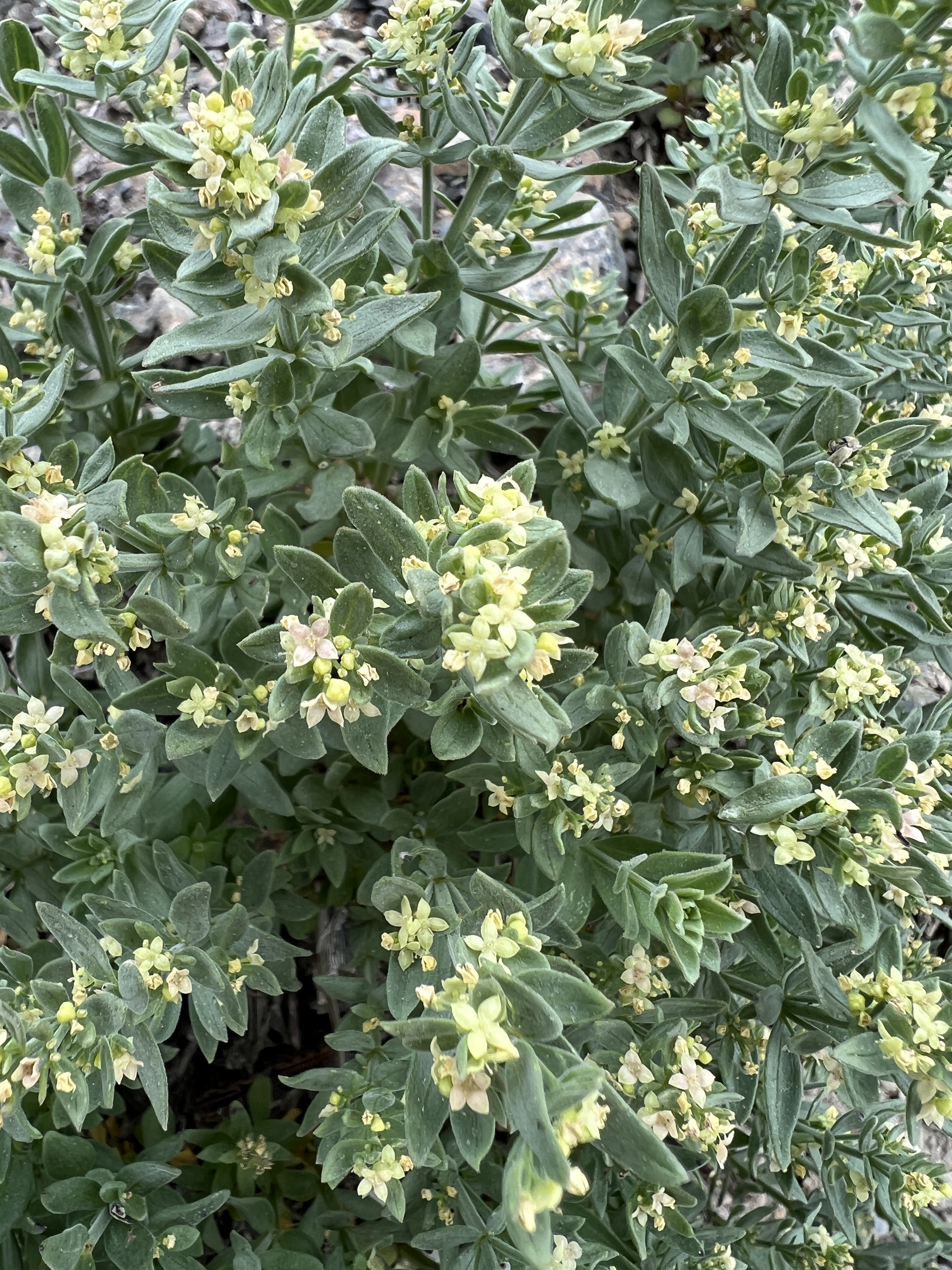
Male in flower
