= Scott Mountains (California) =

Mountain range in California, United States

- Location within California

Highest point
- Elevation: 1,947 m (6,388 ft)

Geography
- Country: United States
- State: California
- Region(s): Klamath National Forest & Shasta-Trinity National Forest
- District(s): Siskiyou County & Trinity County
- Range coordinates: 41°15′44.527″N 122°43′23.091″W
- Parent range: Klamath Mountains System
- Topo map: USGS Scott Mountain
- Biome: Temperate coniferous forests; Klamath-Siskiyou forests (Klamath Mountains ecoregion)

The Scott Mountains are a subrange of the Klamath Mountains located in Siskiyou County, in northwestern California. A high point is Scott Mountain Summit, a mountain gap-pass at 5,554 feet (1,693 m) in elevation.

== Geography ==
The Scott Mountains are a sub-range within the Klamath Mountains System. The Klamath system are of the Pacific Coast Ranges series of mountain range systems that stretch along the West Coast of North America.

The Scott Mountains run from southern Siskiyou County southeast into northern Trinity County.

California State Route 3 passes through the range. The Scott Mountains are located approximately 30 miles (48 km) west of the towns of Mt. Shasta and Dunsmuir that are on Interstate 5.

== Recreation ==
The range is within sections of the Klamath National Forest and Shasta-Trinity National Forest.

Scott Mountain Campground, is at the Scott Mountain summit in the Shasta-Trinity National Forest section. It is located on the summit's west side at the junction of the Pacific Crest Trail and California State Route 3.

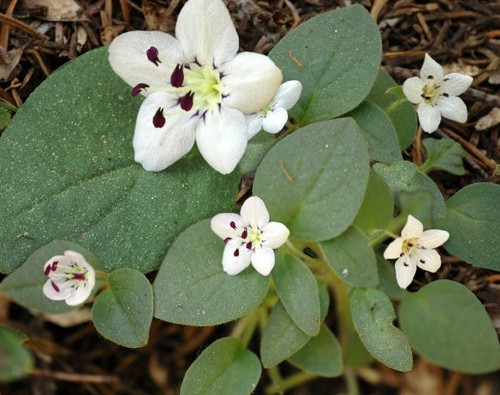
Scott Mountain phacelia (Phacelia dalesiana), endemic to Scott Mountain.

== Ecology ==
Ecoregion

The Scott Mountains are within the Klamath-Siskiyou forests — Klamath Mountains ecoregion, which is part of the Temperate coniferous forests Biome.

Flora

The wildflower Scott Mountain phacelia (Phacelia dalesiana) is endemic to a small area of Scott Mountain.

Plant communities in the range include:

- California mixed evergreen forest
- Cedar hemlock douglas-fir forest

== See also ==
- Klamath Mountains System
- List of mountain ranges of California
