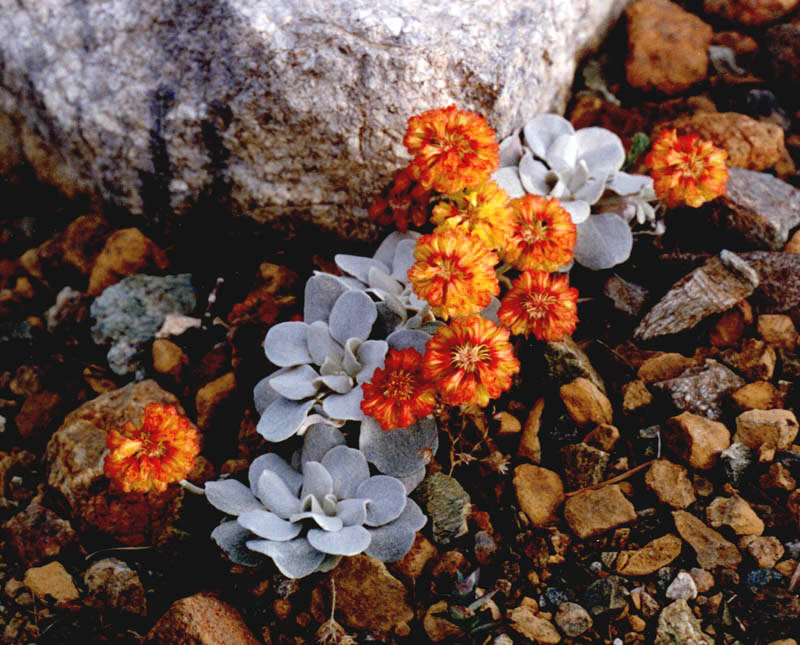

Conservation status
- Imperiled (NatureServe)

Scientific classification
- Kingdom: Plantae
- Clade: Tracheophytes
- Clade: Angiosperms
- Clade: Eudicots
- Order: Caryophyllales
- Family: Polygonaceae
- Genus: Eriogonum
- Species: E. alpinum

Binomial name
- Eriogonum alpinum Engelm.

= Eriogonum alpinum =

Species of wild buckwheat

Eriogonum alpinum is a species of wild buckwheat known by the common name Trinity buckwheat.

== Description ==
Eriogonum alpinum is a perennial herb growing in mats, no more than 15 centimetres (5.9 in) wide and 8 centimetres (3.1 in) tall. The woolly greenish leaves are rounded and one to three centimeters long.

The plant produces an erect inflorescence of bright yellow to pinkish flowers, each under a centimeter wide.

The fruit is an achene about half a centimeter long.

== Taxonomy ==
In 1882 George Engelmann scientifically described a new species in the Eriogonum genus which he named Eriogonum alpinum. Alongside the rest of its genus it is part of the Polygonaceae family and has no botanical synonyms.

== Distribution and habitat ==
This rare plant is endemic to northern California. It is known from only about ten occurrences in the Mount Eddy and Cory Peak areas of the Trinity Mountains, within the Shasta-Trinity National Forest in southern Siskiyou County and northwestern Trinity County.

It grows in rocky serpentine soils at elevations of 2,185–2,900 metres (7,169–9,514 ft), in subalpine coniferous forest, upper montane coniferous forest, and alpine fell-field habitats. The Trinity Mountains are a range of the Klamath Mountains System.

== Conservation ==
This species is a California Department of Fish and Wildlife listed and a California Native Plant Society listed endangered species.

== See also ==
- Endemic flora of California
- Flora of the Klamath Mountains
