= Lupinus lapidicola =

Scientific classification
- Kingdom: Plantae
- Clade: Tracheophytes
- Clade: Angiosperms
- Clade: Eudicots
- Clade: Rosids
- Order: Fabales
- Family: Fabaceae
- Subfamily: Faboideae
- Genus: Lupinus
- Species: L. lapidicola

Binomial name
- Lupinus lapidicola A.Heller

Species of legume

Lupinus lapidicola is a rare species of lupine known by the common name Mt. Eddy lupine. It is endemic to California, where it is known from only a few locations in the northernmost mountain ranges, including Mount Eddy in the Klamath Mountains. It is a small, compact perennial herb forming mats no more than 10 centimetres (3.9 in) tall. Each palmate leaf is divided into 6 to 8 leaflets up to 2 centimetres (0.79 in) long. The herbage is coated in silvery silky hairs. The inflorescence is a small bundle of flower whorls, each flower about a centimeter long and purple in color with a yellowish patch on its banner.
