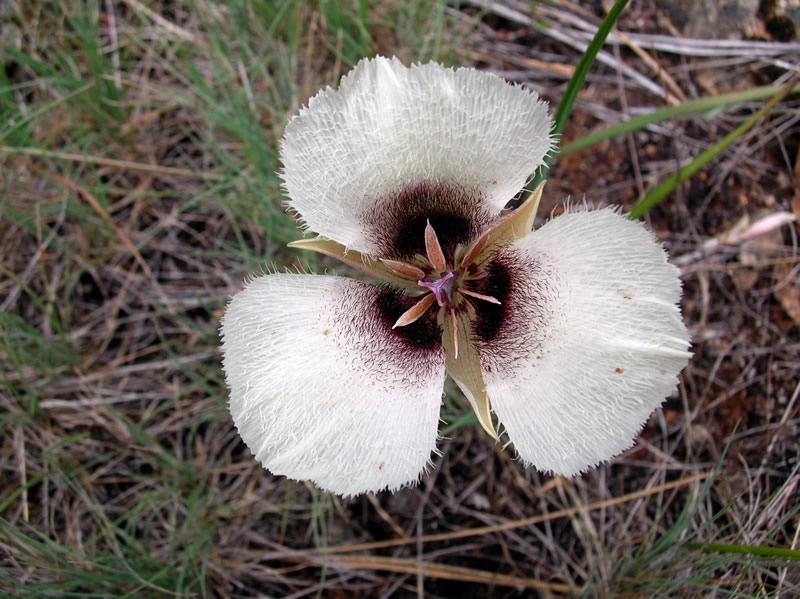

Conservation status
- Vulnerable (NatureServe)

Scientific classification
- Kingdom: Plantae
- Clade: Tracheophytes
- Clade: Angiosperms
- Clade: Monocots
- Order: Liliales
- Family: Liliaceae
- Genus: Calochortus
- Species: C. umpquaensis

Binomial name
- Calochortus umpquaensis N.A.Fredricks

= Calochortus umpquaensis =

Species of flowering plant

Calochortus umpquaensis is a species of flowering plant in the lily family known by the common name Umpqua mariposa lily. It is endemic to Oregon in the United States, where it is mainly limited to the region of the Klamath Mountains on the Little River in Douglas County, in particular the Watson and Ace Williams Mountains. The flower has also been found at a single location in each of Josephine and Jackson Counties.

This plant was described to science in 1989 when an isolated population of what had been reported to be Calochortus howellii was shown to belong to a separate species. The stem is 20 to 30 centimeters tall and the inflorescence contains one or more flowers. The bell-shaped flower has three hairy white or cream-colored petals, each with a bearded purple-black blotch at the base, measuring up to 3.5 centimeters in length. The fruit is a capsule up to 5.4 centimeters long.

This wildflower is always found on serpentine soils in a number of habitat types, including coniferous forest and grassland, and the ecotones between them. The soils are high in nickel, cadmium, magnesium, and phosphorus. Associated plant species include Jeffrey pine (Pinus jeffreyi), incense cedar (Calocedrus decurrens), Douglas-fir (Pseudotsuga menziesii), Hooker's silene (Silene hookeri ssp. hookeri), showy tarweed (Madia elegans var. densifolia), cismontane minuartia (Minuartia cismontana) and Roemer's fescue (Festuca roemeri).

Though rare in general, the plant can be locally abundant, with the population at Ace Williams Mountain containing 400,000 to 800,000 individuals.

Threats to this species include nickel mining, introduced species of plants, and poaching. Logging and grazing of cattle are threats, but these have been mitigated recently on federal lands.
