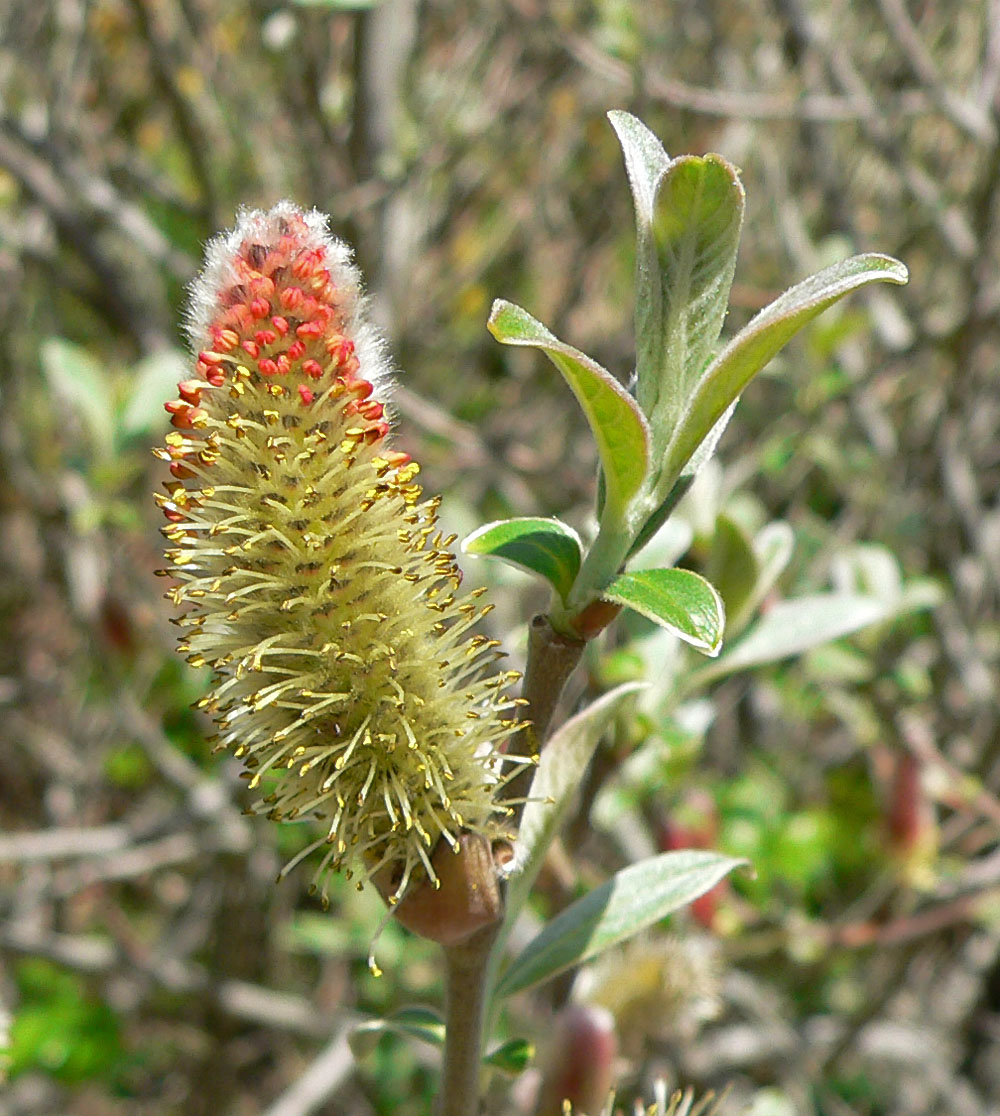

Scientific classification
- Kingdom: Plantae
- Clade: Embryophytes
- Clade: Tracheophytes
- Clade: Spermatophytes
- Clade: Angiosperms
- Clade: Eudicots
- Clade: Rosids
- Order: Malpighiales
- Family: Salicaceae
- Genus: Salix
- Species: S. delnortensis

Binomial name
- Salix delnortensis C.K.Schneid.

= Salix delnortensis =

Species of willow

Salix delnortensis is a species of willow known by the common name Del Norte willow.

== Distribution ==
The plant is endemic to the Klamath Mountains of northwestern California and southwestern Oregon. It is named for Del Norte County, California, its primary distribution locale.

It is also endemic to serpentine soils. It grows in riparian zone and California mixed evergreen forest habitats, between 90–500 metres (300–1,640 ft).

== Description ==
Salix delnortensis is a shrub growing 1–2 metres (3.3–6.6 ft) tall. It forms thickets, sometimes quite large, some of which are made up of clones of one individual. The shrub has many branches, which are very brittle.

The young twigs are velvety or woolly with hairy coats; older branches are hairless. The leaves are oval, sometimes with pointed tips, smooth-edged, and woolly on the undersides. They grow to 10 centimeters long or more.

The inflorescences are produced before the leaves. Each is a catkin of flowers. Male catkins are about 3 centimeters long and thick, while female catkins vary in size. Its bloom period is April and May.
