= California mixed evergreen forest =

Plant community in California and Oregon, US

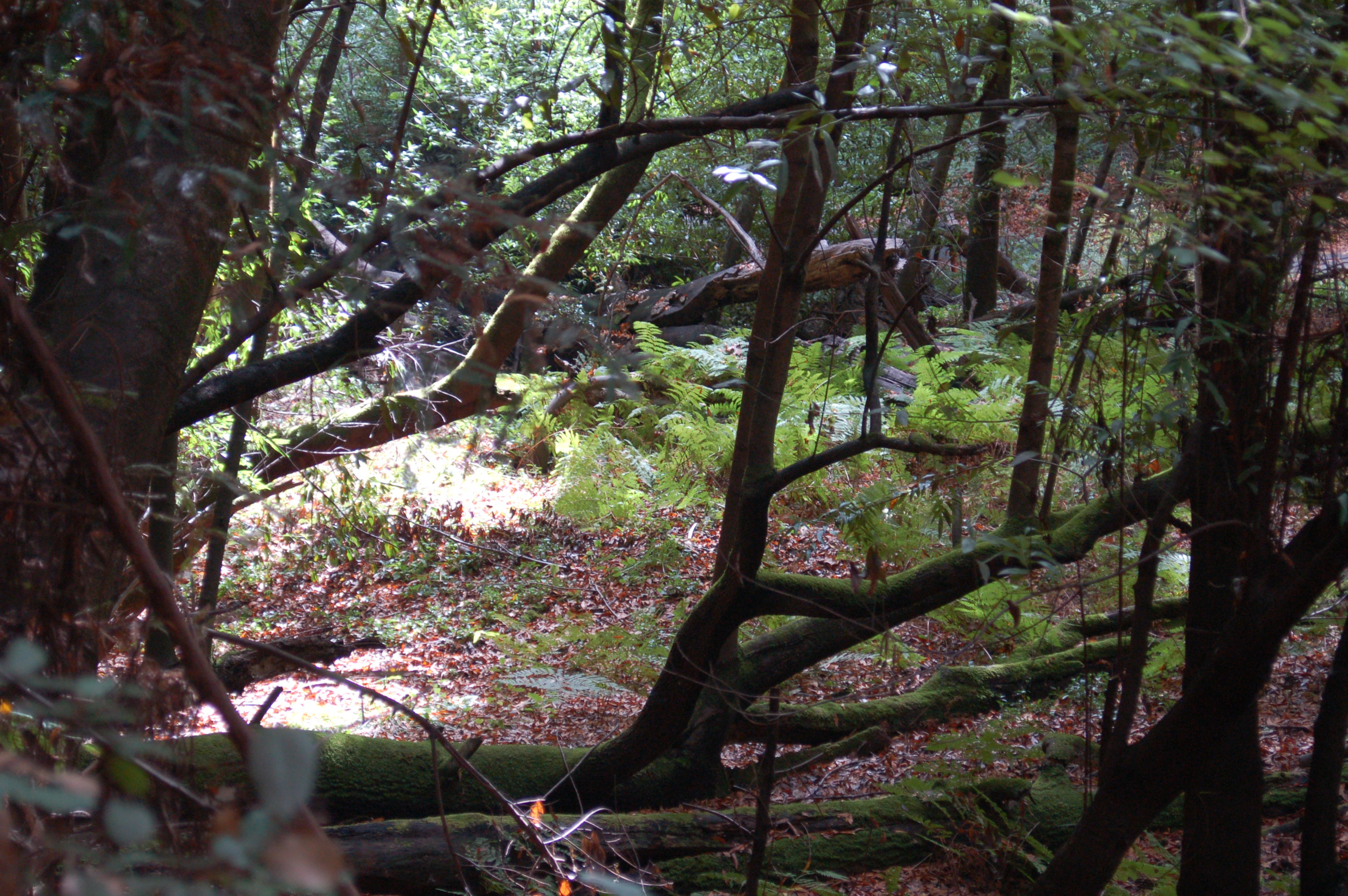
California mixed evergreen forest in the Santa Cruz Mountains

California mixed evergreen forest is a plant community found in the mountain ranges of California and southwestern Oregon.

The Mixed evergreen forest plant community is native to the Northern and Southern California Coast Ranges and Sierra Nevada of central and northern California; the Transverse Ranges and Peninsular Ranges of southern California; and the southwestern Oregon Coast Ranges.

California mixed evergreen forests occur in ecoregions of the California Floristic Province, including in areas of the California chaparral and woodlands and its sub-ecoregions, Klamath-Siskiyou Mountains forests, Northern California coastal forests, and Sierra Nevada lower montane forest. The mixed evergreen forests of each ecoregion have slightly different species composition.

== Klamath-Siskiyou mixed evergreen forest ==
The mixed evergreen forests of the Klamath Mountains-Siskiyou Mountains occur above 300 meters (1000 ft) elevation, and are of four main types. Douglas-fir forests are found on gentle slopes, north-facing slopes, ridges with deep soil, and river terraces with deep sediments, usually underlain with sedimentary rocks. Coast Douglas-fir (Pseudotsuga menziesii ssp. menziesii) is the predominant tree, occupying up to 70% of the forest cover. Broadleaf evergreen trees are relatively few. Tree species of secondary importance are:

- Sugar pine (Pinus lambertiana),
- Ponderosa pine (Pinus ponderosa),
- White fir (Abies concolor).

On granite soils, a similar species composition predominates, but with more broadleaf evergreens, chiefly:

- Tanoak (Lithocarpus densiflora) and
- Canyon live oak (Quercus chrysolepis), along with
- Giant chinquapin (Chrysolepis chrysophylla).

On steep, well drained slopes, canyon live oak is the dominant species, with coast Douglas-fir in a minor role.

On serpentine soils, mixed evergreen forests are made up of:

moister areas

- Lawson's cypress (also known as Port Orford cedar, Chamaecyparis lawsoniana) and
- Western white pine (Pinus monticola)

drier areas

- Incense cedar (Calocedrus decurrens),
- Jeffrey pine (Pinus jeffreyi),
- Knobcone pine (Pinus attenuata).

== California Coast Ranges mixed evergreen forest ==
Mixed evergreen forests in the California Coast Ranges vary in species related to coastal (Outer Ranges) or inland (Inner Ranges) climate influences. It usually happens in the elevation from 0 meter to 500 meters high. Mountains in the San Francisco Bay Area frequently support mixed evergreen forests. Generally the moister the forest habitat the greater the understory density. Coast mixed evergreen is drier than coast redwood and it is a four-layer forest structure. The conifers are usually emergent as canopy layer and broad-leaf evergreen trees emerge as sub-canopy layer. The shrubs occur as the understory species.

Those closer to the coast receiving adequate fog moisture and high rainfall generally will feature the following species:

- Coast Douglas-fir,
- Coast redwood (Sequoia sempervirens)
- Tanoak, (Notholithocarpus densiflorus)
- Pacific madrone (Arbutus menziesii),
- California bay laurel (Umbellularia californica),
- Canyon live oak (Quercus chrysolepis),
- Interior live oak (Quercus wislizenii),
- Coast live oak (Quercus agrifolia),
- Black oak (Q. kelloggii),
- Oregon oak (Q. garryana)
- Big leaf maple (Acer macrophyllum).

Further inland, on north facing slopes or protected canyons, these forests are drier and generally lack tanoak, Douglas fir, and coast redwood. Species typical of the drier neighboring oak woodlands join the mix:

- Coulter pine (Pinus coulteri) or
- Gray pine (Pinus sabiniana)

Common wildlife include Steller's jay, chestnut-backed chickadee, western gray squirrel, raccoon and many others. These forests are more diverse in animal life than those having only conifers. The predominance of broadleaf trees provide a greater abundance of food sources.

== Southern Coast, Transverse, and Peninsular Ranges mixed evergreen forest ==
Also called southern mixed evergreen forests, the mixed evergreen forests of the southern California Coast Ranges, the Transverse Ranges, and the northern Peninsular Ranges, are restricted to cooler north-facing slopes at higher elevations.

Predominant tree species include:

- Tanoak (Notholithocarpus densiflorus)
- Madrone (Arbutus menziesii)
- Canyon live oak (Quercus chrysolepis)
- Coast live oak (Quercus agrifolia)
- California bay laurel (Umbellularia californica)
- Jeffrey pine (Pinus jeffreyi)
- Coulter pine (Pinus coulteri)
- Bigcone Douglas-fir (Pseudotsuga macrocarpa).

== See also ==
- Mixed coniferous forest
- Plant communities of California
- Temperate broadleaf and mixed forests in the United States
