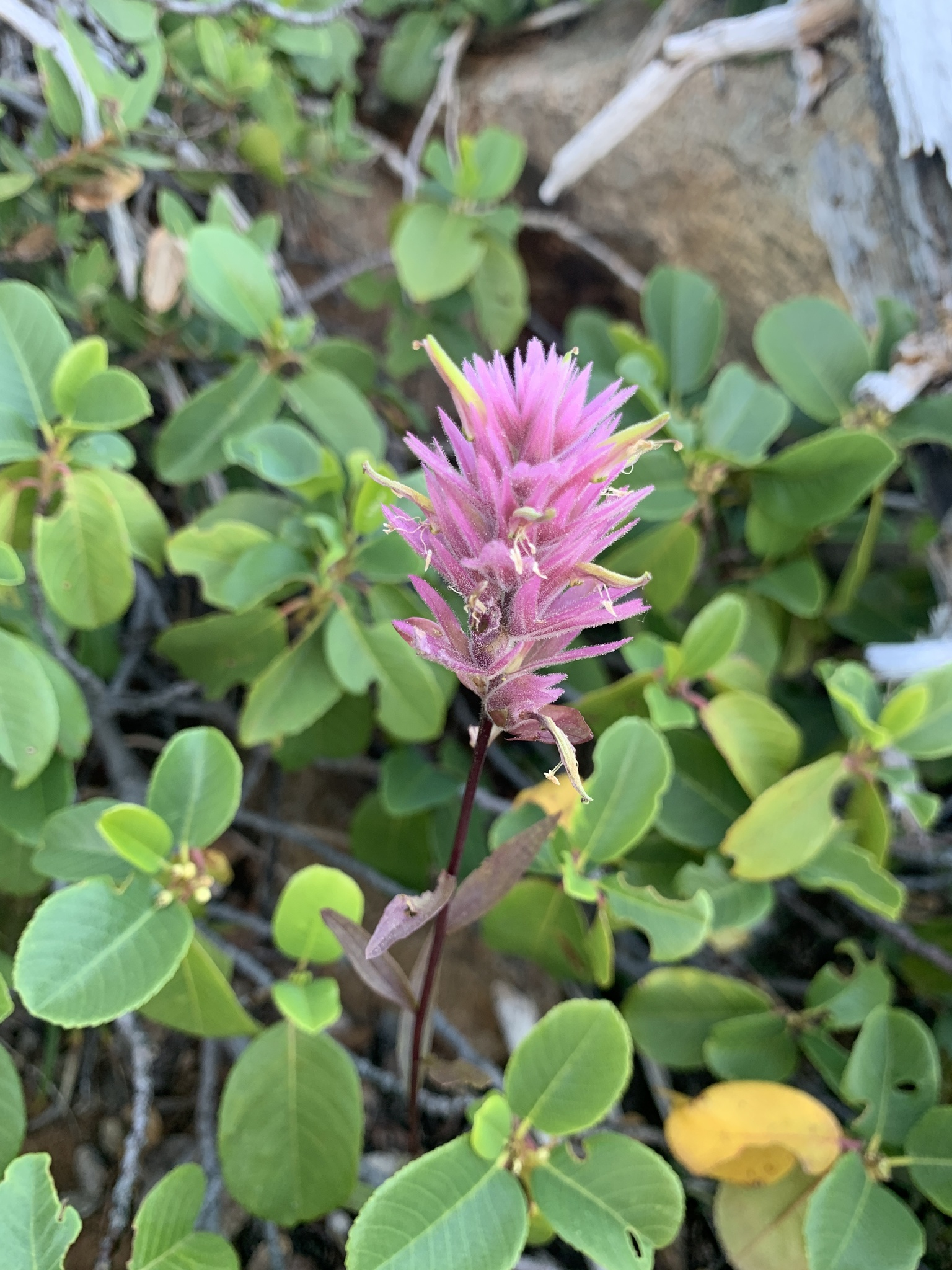

Scientific classification
- Kingdom: Plantae
- Clade: Tracheophytes
- Clade: Angiosperms
- Clade: Eudicots
- Clade: Asterids
- Order: Lamiales
- Family: Orobanchaceae
- Genus: Castilleja
- Species: C. elata

Binomial name
- Castilleja elata Piper

= Castilleja elata =

Species of plant

Castilleja elata is a species of flowering plant in the family Orobanchaceae with the common name Siskiyou paintbrush.

== Range ==
Castilleja elata is native to the Siskiyou Mountains in southern Oregon and northern California.

== Habitat ==
Castilleja elata grows in boggy areas, often on serpentine soils.
