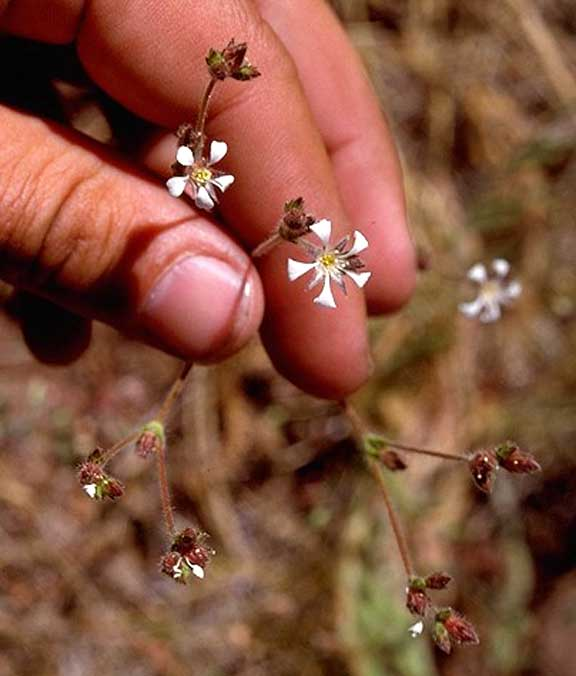

Conservation status
- Imperiled (NatureServe)

Scientific classification
- Kingdom: Plantae
- Clade: Tracheophytes
- Clade: Angiosperms
- Clade: Eudicots
- Clade: Rosids
- Order: Rosales
- Family: Rosaceae
- Genus: Potentilla
- Species: P. pickeringii

Binomial name
- Potentilla pickeringii (Torr. ex Gray) Greene

Synonyms
- Horkelia pickeringii (Torr. ex A.Gray) Rydb.; Ivesia pickeringii Torr. ex A.Gray

= Potentilla pickeringii =

Species of flowering plant

Potentilla pickeringii, also known as silky mousetail and Pickering's ivesia, is an uncommon species of flowering plant in the rose family. It is endemic to the Klamath Mountains of northern California where it is a plant of mountain meadows, often on serpentine soils.

== Description ==
Potentilla pickeringii is a perennial herb forming tufts of long, erect leaves and thin, naked stems. Each leaf is a taillike strip of overlapping lobed leaflets. The reddish to greenish stems reach 30 to 50 centimeters in height and bear inflorescences of clustered flowers. The stems, leaves, and inflorescences are all covered in fuzzy white to gray hairs. Each flower is about a centimeter wide, with pinkish-green triangular sepals and longer, narrower pink or purple petals. In the center of the flower are 20 stamens and a few pistils.
