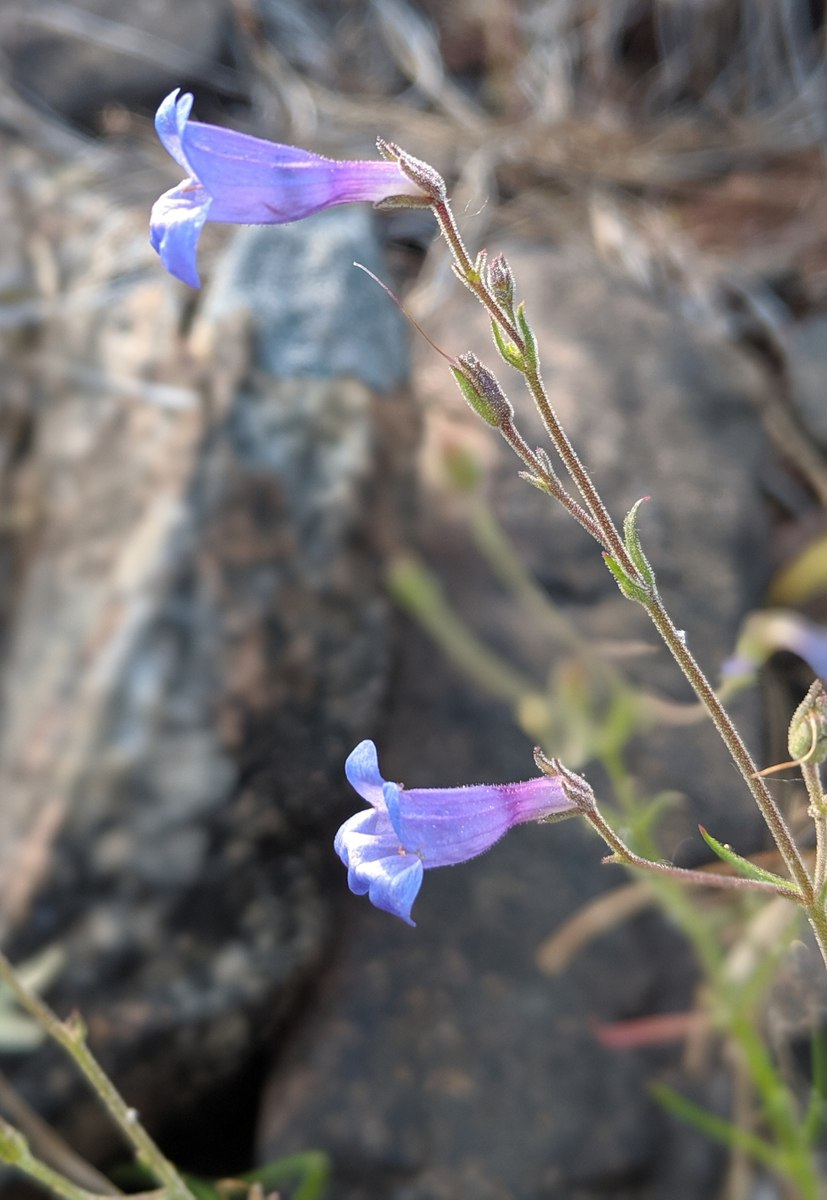

Conservation status
- Apparently Secure (NatureServe)

Scientific classification
- Kingdom: Plantae
- Clade: Tracheophytes
- Clade: Angiosperms
- Clade: Eudicots
- Clade: Asterids
- Order: Lamiales
- Family: Plantaginaceae
- Genus: Penstemon
- Species: P. filiformis

Binomial name
- Penstemon filiformis (D.D.Keck) D.D.Keck

Synonyms
- Penstemon laetus subsp. filiformis D.D.Keck; Penstemon laetus var. filiformis (D.D.Keck) McMinn

= Penstemon filiformis =

Plant species in the plantain family

Penstemon filiformis is an uncommon species of Penstemon known by the common name threadleaf penstemon. It is endemic to the Klamath Mountains of northern California, where it grows in forest and woodland, often on serpentine soils.

== Description ==
Penstemon filiformis may be a subshrub, a plant that is partly woody, or herbaceous plant. When a subshrub it has an open form and a very woody base. Its stems may grow straight upwards or outwards before curving to grow upright, reaching a height between 16 and 50 centimeters (6.5 and 19.5 in). The texture of the stems ranges from puberulent to retrorsely hairy, having very thin, short, stiff hairs to backwards facing hairs, but are not waxy or glaucous.

The leaves are very narrow, linear and rolled to threadlike, with a length of 2 to 7 centimeters. The leaves low on the plant sometimes borne in clusters. They may be covered in the same pointed hairs as the stems or may be hairless and on the stems there will be eight to twelve pairs.

The inflorescence is 9 to 22 cm (3.5 to 8.5 in) of the upper portion of the stems. Each inflorescence will have one to five groups of flowers with each group having one or two cymes with one to three flowers. The flower petals are fused into funnel shape 13 to 18 cm long and are covered in glandular hairs externally, but hairless inside. The fused flower petals are blue-purple with a blue limb, but the flower buds are yellowish.

== Taxonomy ==
Penstemon filiformis was initially described as a subspecies named Penstemon laetus subsp. filiformis by David D. Keck in 1932. The botanist Howard Earnest McMinn published a description of it as a variety of the same species in 1939 in the Illustrated Manual of California Shrubs. Keck revised his own classification to a species with the present name in 1951. Penstemon filiformis has no varieties or other synonyms. The type specimen was collected in the Sacramento River Canyon between Lamoine and Sims.

=== Names ===
In English it is known variously by related common names such as threadleaf penstemon, thread-leaved penstemon, threadleaf beardtongue, or thread-leaved beardtongue.

== Range and habitat ==
Threadleaf penstemon is endemic to the state of California where it grows in the Klamath Mountains. The known populations grow in Lake, Shasta, Siskiyou, and Trinity counties. It is found above 400 meters (1,300 ft) and below 600 m (2,000 ft). The area of its range is between 1,000 and 5,000 square kilometers (400 and 1,900 sq mi).

It grows on open rocky flats and gulches in the transition zone. It is associated with Jeffrey pine (Pinus jeffreyi) in the lower montane forest. It is strongly associated with serpentine soil, but does not always grow on them.

=== Conservation ===
The conservation organization NatureServe evaluated Penstemon filiformis in 2022 and rated it as apparently secure (G4). Though it has a very narrow range it is abundant in its habitat with about half of its population on United States Forest Service land.

== See also ==
- List of Penstemon species
