= Cleman Mountain =

Mountain in Washington, United States

Coordinates: 46.8198444°N 120.8492423°W

Cleman Mountain is a ridge in Yakima County, Washington, in the United States.

Cleman Mountain was named for John Cleman, a local pioneer in the Wenas Valley.
