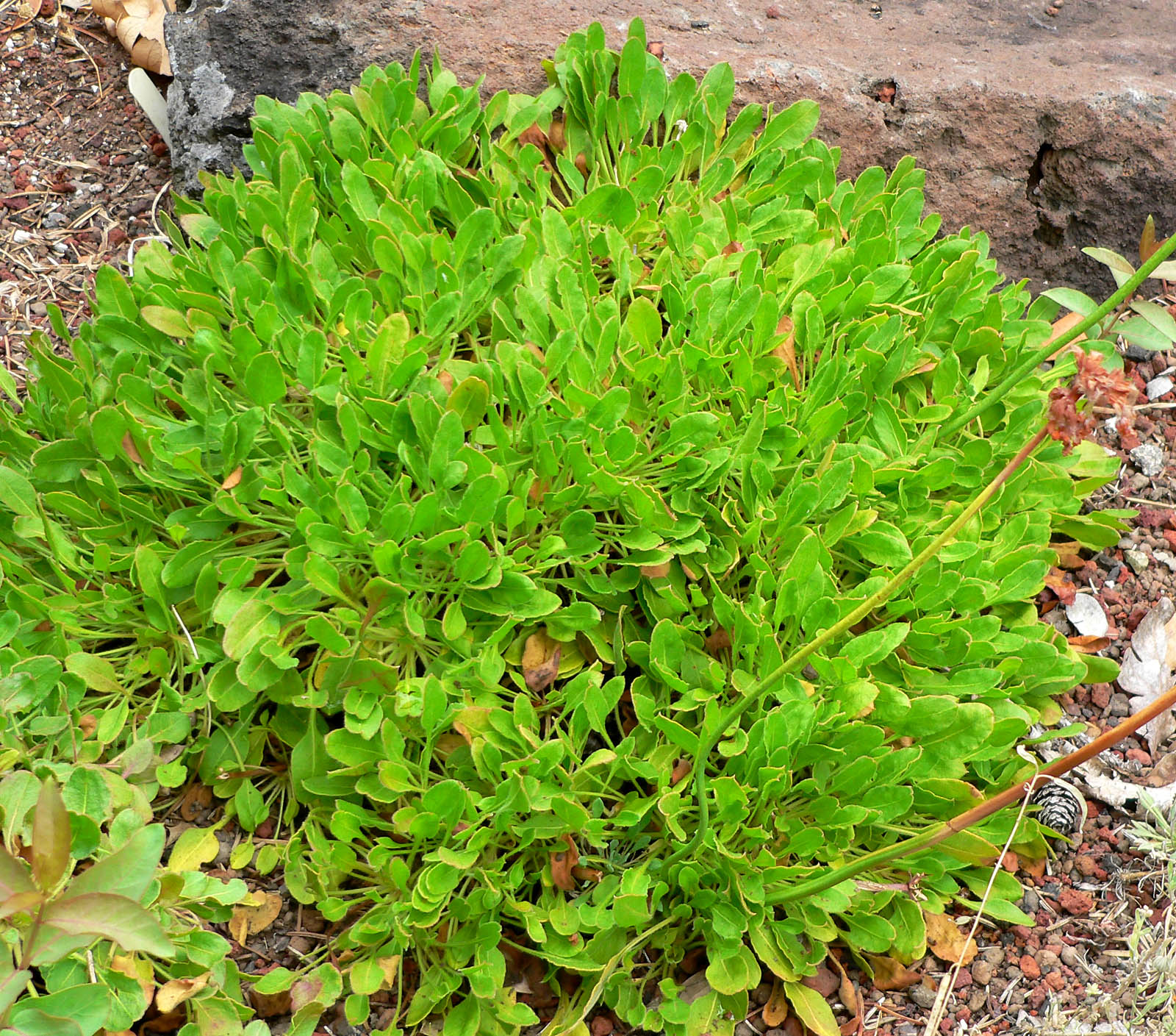

Conservation status
- Imperiled (NatureServe)

Scientific classification
- Kingdom: Plantae
- Clade: Tracheophytes
- Clade: Angiosperms
- Clade: Eudicots
- Order: Caryophyllales
- Family: Polygonaceae
- Genus: Eriogonum
- Species: E. hirtellum

Binomial name
- Eriogonum hirtellum J. T. Howell & Bacig.

= Eriogonum hirtellum =

Species of wild buckwheat

Eriogonum hirtellum is a species of wild buckwheat known by the common name Klamath Mountain buckwheat. It is endemic to the Klamath Mountains of far northern California, where it is known from only a few occurrences.

== Description ==
This is a perennial herb forming thick, woody mats up to 40 centimeters high and wide on serpentine soils. It has light green, hairless leaves each up to two centimeters long and it blooms in spherical clusters of bright yellow or pink flowers.

While this plant has a very small distribution, it is not currently considered threatened.
