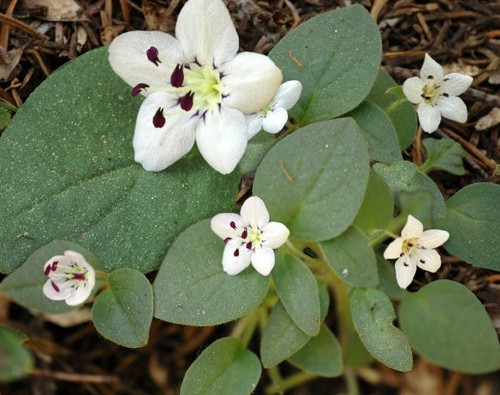

Scientific classification
- Kingdom: Plantae
- Clade: Tracheophytes
- Clade: Angiosperms
- Clade: Eudicots
- Clade: Asterids
- Order: Boraginales
- Family: Hydrophyllaceae
- Genus: Phacelia
- Species: P. dalesiana

Binomial name
- Phacelia dalesiana J.T.Howell

Synonyms
- Howellanthus dalesianus (J.T.Howell) Walden & R.Patt.

= Phacelia dalesiana =

Species of plant

Phacelia dalesiana is a species of flowering plants in the family Hydrophyllaceae endemic to California. It is commonly known as Scott Mountain phacelia or Howell's phacelia. Under the synonym Howellanthus dalesianus, it was considered to be the only species in the monotypic genus Howellanthus.

== Description ==
Phacelia dalesiana is a perennial herb producing a few decumbent stems up to about 15 centimeters long, forming a patch on the ground. It is glandular and hairy in texture. The leaves are located in a rosette, with a few smaller ones along the stems. They are oval and smooth-edged.

The inflorescence is a small curving cluster of flowers each just under a centimeter wide. The flower is white with small purple streaks at the throat. There are five protruding stamens tipped with large purple anthers. It blooms between May and August, the timing dependent on snowmelt.

== Taxonomy ==
Phacelia dalesiana was first described in 1937 by John Thomas Howell. In 2010, it was transferred to a new monotypic genus Howellanthus as Howellanthus dalesianus, the name honoring botanist John Thomas Howell. The type location is the summit of Scott Mountain in Trinity County, California, near California State Route 3 and the Pacific Crest Trail, the type locality for many species of rare endemic plants. As of March 2024, the transfer was not accepted by sources such as Plants of the World Online and the World Flora Online.

== Distribution and habitat ==
It is endemic to the southern Klamath Mountains of northern California, including the Scott Mountains for which it is named. It grows in mountain forests and meadows often on serpentine soils. The plant is a paleoendemic, its morphology unique among the phacelias, and probably a relict persisting in areas of ultramafic rock substrate in a small section of the Siskiyou-Trinity Mountains.
