= Phacelia leonis =

Scientific classification
- Kingdom: Plantae
- Clade: Tracheophytes
- Clade: Angiosperms
- Clade: Eudicots
- Clade: Asterids
- Order: Boraginales
- Family: Hydrophyllaceae
- Genus: Phacelia
- Species: P. leonis

Binomial name
- Phacelia leonis J.T.Howell

Species of plant

Phacelia leonis is a rare species of phacelia known by the common name Siskiyou phacelia. It is endemic to the Klamath Mountains of southern Oregon and far northern California, where it grows in serpentine soils in the coniferous forests.

== Description ==
Phacelia leonis is an annual herb producing a usually unbranched erect stem up to 15 centimeters tall. It is glandular and lightly hairy in texture. The narrow, tapering leaves are 1 to 3 centimeters long. The hairy inflorescence is a one-sided cyme of bell-shaped flowers. Each flower is only 2 or 3 millimeters long and light blue or lavender in color.
