= Silene serpentinicola =

Conservation status
- Imperiled (NatureServe)

Scientific classification
- Kingdom: Plantae
- Clade: Embryophytes
- Clade: Tracheophytes
- Clade: Spermatophytes
- Clade: Angiosperms
- Clade: Eudicots
- Order: Caryophyllales
- Family: Caryophyllaceae
- Genus: Silene
- Species: S. serpentinicola

Binomial name
- Silene serpentinicola T.W.Nelson & J.P.Nelson

Species of flowering plant

Silene serpentinicola is a rare species of flowering plant in the family Caryophyllaceae known by the common name serpentine Indian pink and serpentine catchfly.

It was described to science in 2004. It is currently known only from Del Norte County, California, where it is an endemic of the serpentine soils of the Smith River basin. It probably also occurs north of the border in Oregon. It is a resident of chaparral and coniferous forest habitat among other serpentine endemics.

== Description ==
Silene serpentinicola is a small rhizomatous perennial herb growing up to 10 or 15 centimeters tall. The paired leaves are gray-green in color, spatula-shaped, and up to 4.5 centimeters long, mostly crowded along the short stems.

The inflorescence is a terminal cyme at the top of the stem containing 1 to 4 flowers. Each flower is borne on a short, glandular pedicel. The flower has a hairy, purplish calyx of sepals which is tubular, inflated and lined with ten veins. The corolla is about 3 centimeters wide and bright red in color. Each of the five petals is divided into two lobes which are each subdivided into two narrower lobes. The long stamens and three styles protrude from the flower's center.
