= Silene salmonacea =

Conservation status
- Critically Imperiled (NatureServe)

Scientific classification
- Kingdom: Plantae
- Clade: Embryophytes
- Clade: Tracheophytes
- Clade: Spermatophytes
- Clade: Angiosperms
- Clade: Eudicots
- Order: Caryophyllales
- Family: Caryophyllaceae
- Genus: Silene
- Species: S. salmonacea

Binomial name
- Silene salmonacea T.W.Nelson, J.P.Nelson & S.A.Erwin

Species of flowering plant

Silene salmonacea is a rare, newly described species of flowering plant in the family Caryophyllaceae known by the common names Klamath Mountain catchfly and salmon-flowered catchfly. It is known only from Trinity County, California, where it grows in the forests of the southern Klamath Mountains. It is a member of the serpentine soils flora. It is a small perennial herb growing just a few centimeters tall. The spoon-shaped leaves are up to 3.5 centimeters long. The herbage is gray-green and lightly woolly in texture. Each flower has a tubular calyx of fused sepals lined with ten veins. There are five salmon pink petals, each with four lobes at the tip.

This plant occurs in six areas, two of which contain fewer than five individuals.
