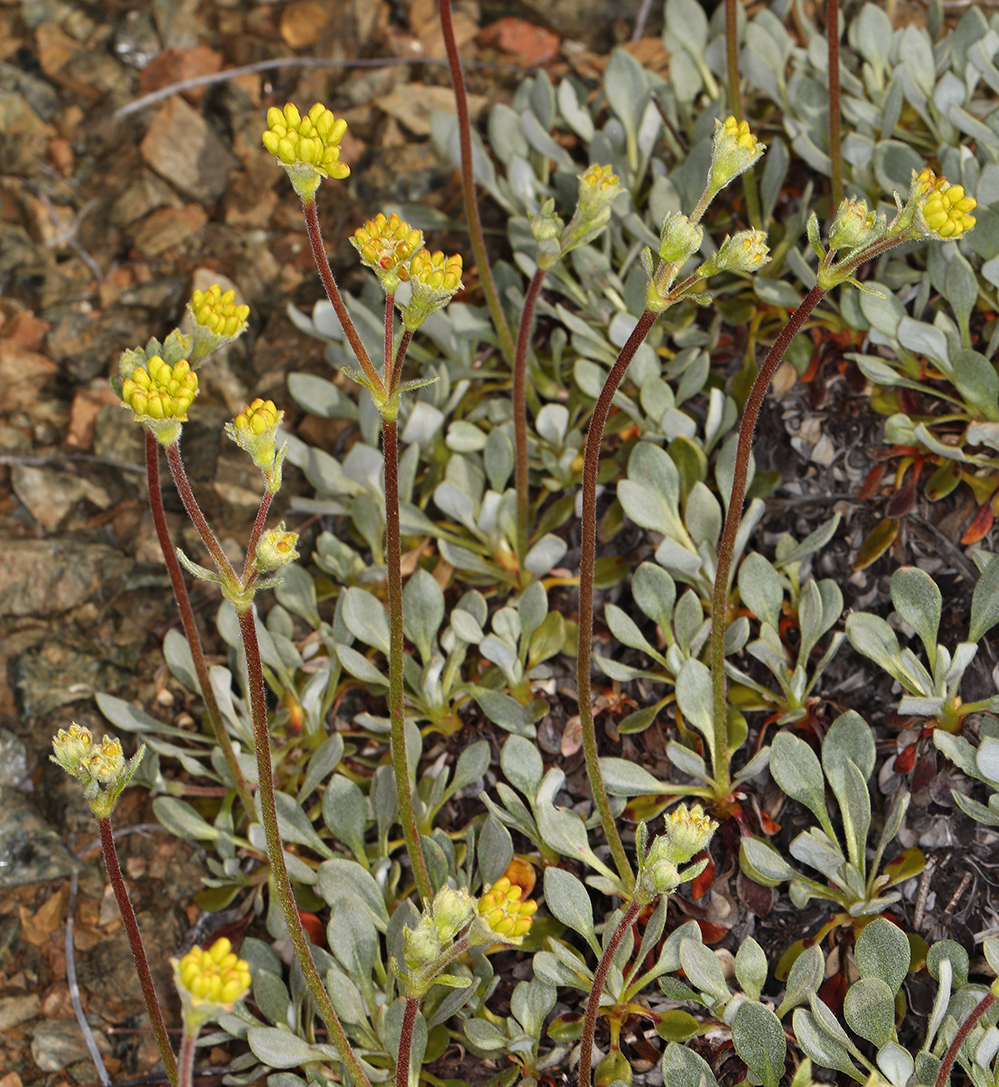

Scientific classification
- Kingdom: Plantae
- Clade: Tracheophytes
- Clade: Angiosperms
- Clade: Eudicots
- Order: Caryophyllales
- Family: Polygonaceae
- Genus: Eriogonum
- Species: E. libertini

Binomial name
- Eriogonum libertini Reveal

= Eriogonum libertini =

Species of wild buckwheat

Eriogonum libertini is a species of wild buckwheat known by the common name Dubakella Mountain buckwheat. This uncommon plant is endemic to California where it grows in the rocky serpentine terrain of the southern Klamath Mountains and nearby ranges.

It is named for the local peak Dubakella Mountain.

== Description ==
This is a squat mountain plant forming leafy mats up to half a meter wide with spindly erect inflorescences up to 30 centimeters tall. The leaves are woolly and pale green to silver. The clusters of flowers atop the inflorescences are bright yellow.
