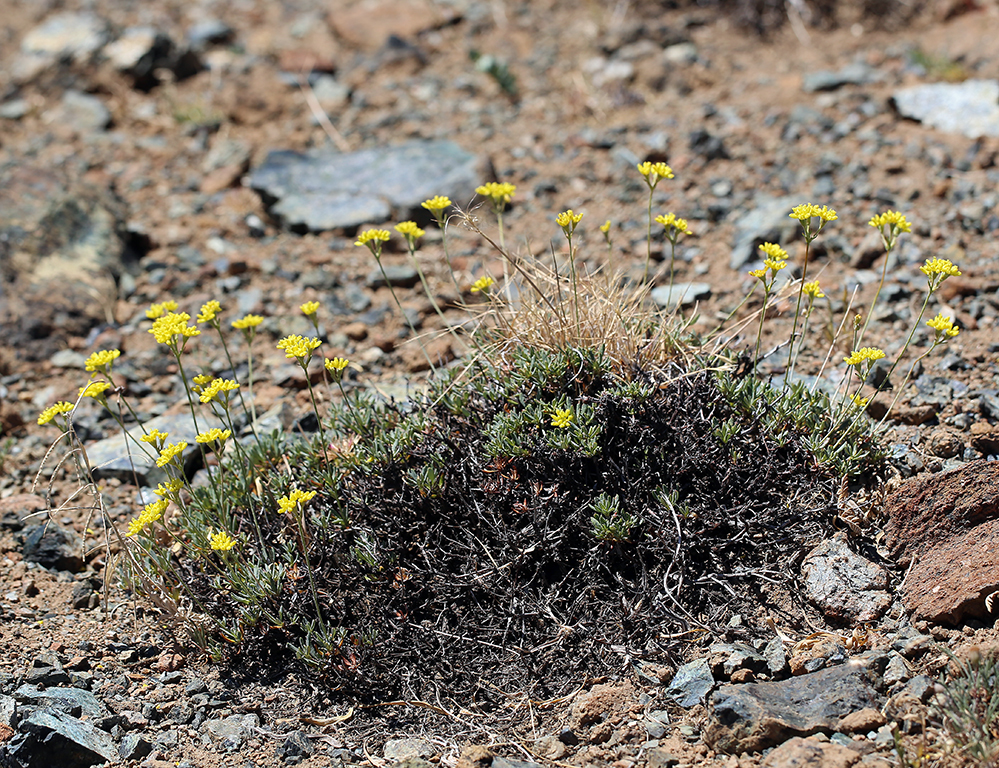

Conservation status
- Apparently Secure (NatureServe)

Scientific classification
- Kingdom: Plantae
- Clade: Tracheophytes
- Clade: Angiosperms
- Clade: Eudicots
- Order: Caryophyllales
- Family: Polygonaceae
- Genus: Eriogonum
- Species: E. congdonii

Binomial name
- Eriogonum congdonii (S.Stokes) Reveal

Synonyms
- Eriogonum ternatum var. congdonii; Eriogonum ursinum var. congdonii

= Eriogonum congdonii =

Species of wild buckwheat

Eriogonum congdonii is a species of wild buckwheat known by the common name Congdon's buckwheat. It is endemic to the Klamath Mountains of northern California, where it is an uncommon member of the serpentine soils flora in the local forests. It is a low, matting shrub growing up to about half a meter wide and tall. The woolly leaves are widely lance-shaped and are found along the stems, especially in clusters at the stem tips. The inflorescence is an erect, dense umbel of many tiny bright yellow flowers.

== Taxonomy ==
The first description of Eriogonum congdonii was by Susan Gabriella Stokes, who published it in 1936 as Eriogonum ursinum var. congdonii. In 1952 John Thomas Howell published it as a variety of Eriogonum ternatum, but in 1970 James L. Reveal raised it to a species as Eriogonum congdonii. It is classified in the Eriogonum genus within the Polygonaceae family.

== Range ==
Eriogonum congdonii is endemic to northern California where it recorded in three counties, Siskiyou, Shasta, and Trinity.
