= Mount Eddy =

Peak in California, U.S.

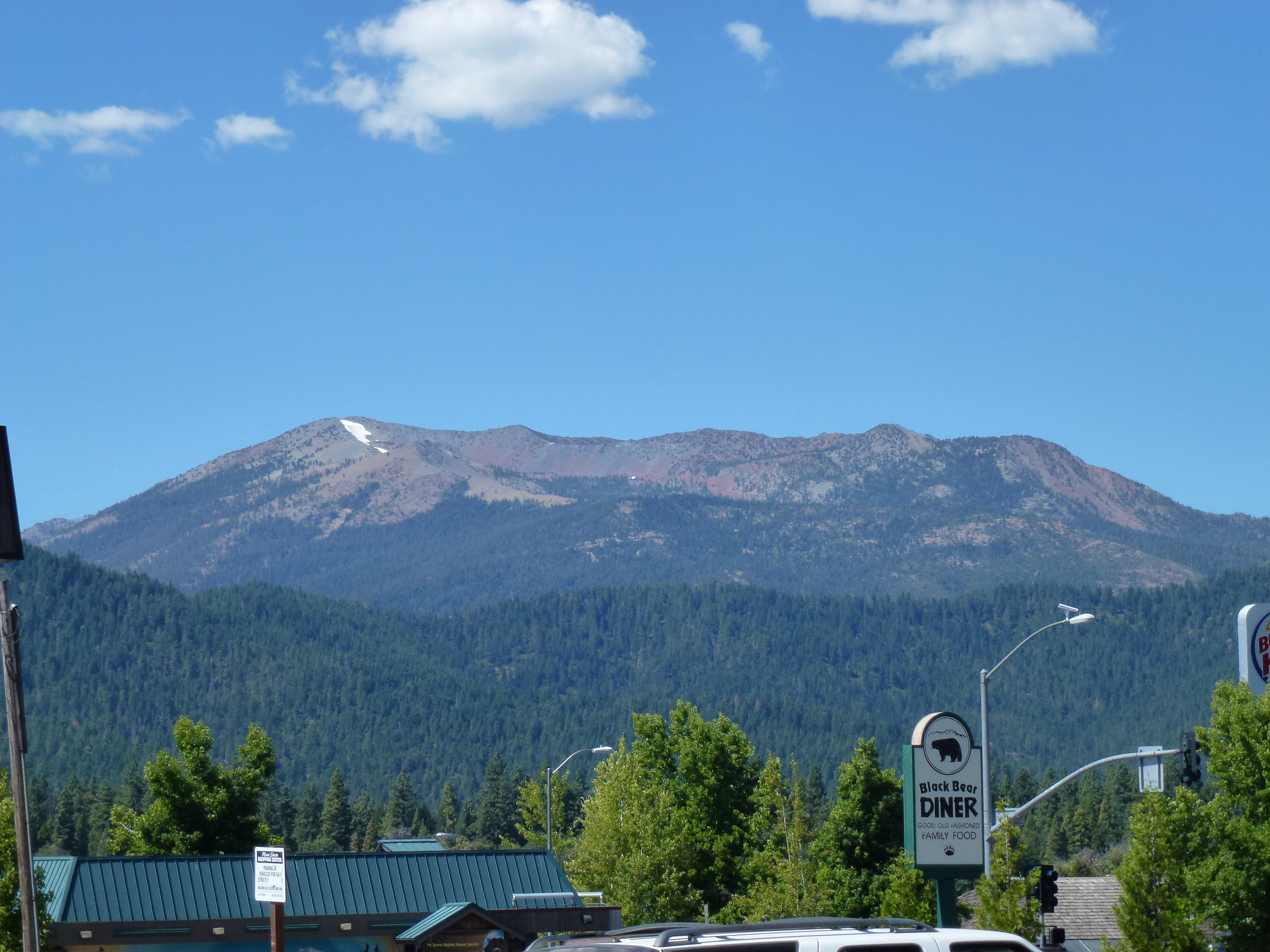
- Mount Eddy from Mount Shasta City

Highest point
- Elevation: 9,037 ft (2,754 m) NAVD 88
- Prominence: 5,153 ft (1,571 m)
- Listing: California county high points 20th; U.S. most prominent peaks 121st
- Coordinates: 41°19′11″N 122°28′45″W

Geography
- Location within California
- Country: United States
- State: California
- Counties: Siskiyou and Trinity
- Protected area: Shasta–Trinity National Forest
- Parent range: Trinity Mountains
- Topo map: USGS Mount Eddy

Mount Eddy is the highest peak of the Trinity Mountains, a mountain range of the Klamath Mountains System, located in Siskiyou County, and Trinity County in northern California.

The mountain is in the Mount Eddy RNA, a Research Natural Area on the Shasta–Trinity National Forest, a unit of the United States Forest Service. The mountain is composed of mesozoic ultramafic rock, predominantly serpentinized peridotite.

== Geography ==
The summit rises to an elevation of 9,037 feet (2,754 m), and is the highest point in Trinity County, the ninth most prominent peak in California, and the highest summit west of Interstate 5 in the United States.

The peak is west of Mount Shasta City and the massive Mount Shasta volcano. It is protected within the Shasta-Trinity National Forest.

The mountain receives heavy snowfall during the winter due to its altitude.

The mountain is named in honor of Olive Paddock Eddy, who is mistakenly held to be the first woman to climb Mount Shasta. She was 8 months pregnant at the time that she is credited with climbing the volcano. Harriet Catherine Eddy was actually the first woman to summit the mountain. Nelson Harvey Eddy arrived in the area from New York State in 1856. He later became a successful rancher in the Shasta Valley. The original Wintu name might have been Num-mel-be-le-sas-pam or "west blaze mountain".

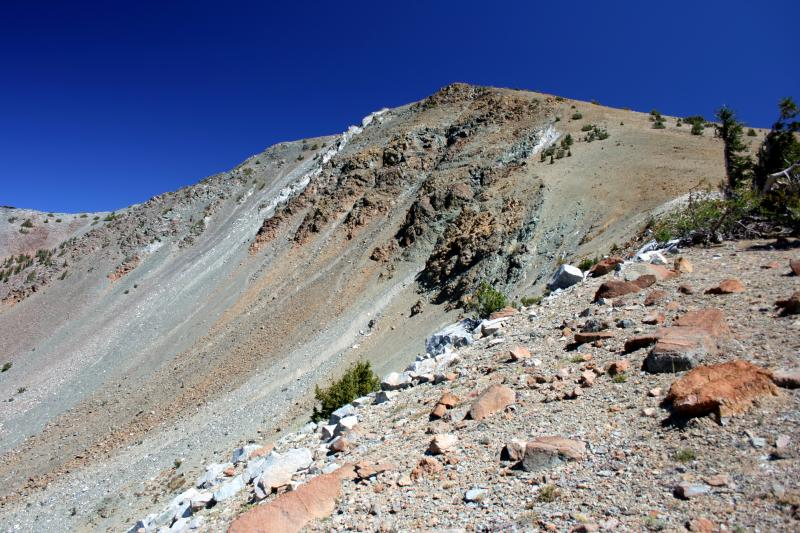
The summit of Mount Eddy

=== Climate ===
Climate data for Mount Eddy 41.3178 N, 122.4737 W, Elevation: 8,468 ft (2,581 m) (1991–2020 normals)
Month	Jan	Feb	Mar	Apr	May	Jun	Jul	Aug	Sep	Oct	Nov	Dec	Year
Mean daily maximum °F (°C)	34.8 (1.6)	34.3 (1.3)	36.1 (2.3)	40.1 (4.5)	48.4 (9.1)	57.4 (14.1)	67.4 (19.7)	66.9 (19.4)	61.5 (16.4)	51.0 (10.6)	39.3 (4.1)	33.9 (1.1)	47.6 (8.7)
Daily mean °F (°C)	27.7 (−2.4)	26.4 (−3.1)	27.5 (−2.5)	30.4 (−0.9)	37.9 (3.3)	45.9 (7.7)	55.0 (12.8)	54.6 (12.6)	49.6 (9.8)	40.9 (4.9)	31.9 (−0.1)	27.1 (−2.7)	37.9 (3.3)
Mean daily minimum °F (°C)	20.5 (−6.4)	18.5 (−7.5)	19.0 (−7.2)	20.8 (−6.2)	27.5 (−2.5)	34.5 (1.4)	42.7 (5.9)	42.2 (5.7)	37.7 (3.2)	30.8 (−0.7)	24.5 (−4.2)	20.2 (−6.6)	28.2 (−2.1)
Average precipitation inches (mm)	11.45 (291)	10.22 (260)	10.61 (269)	6.79 (172)	5.04 (128)	2.50 (64)	0.66 (17)	0.35 (8.9)	1.13 (29)	3.30 (84)	6.77 (172)	11.84 (301)	70.66 (1,795.9)
Source: PRISM Climate Group

== See also ==
- Media related to Mount Eddy at Wikimedia Commons
- List of highest points in California by county
- List of Ultras of the United States
