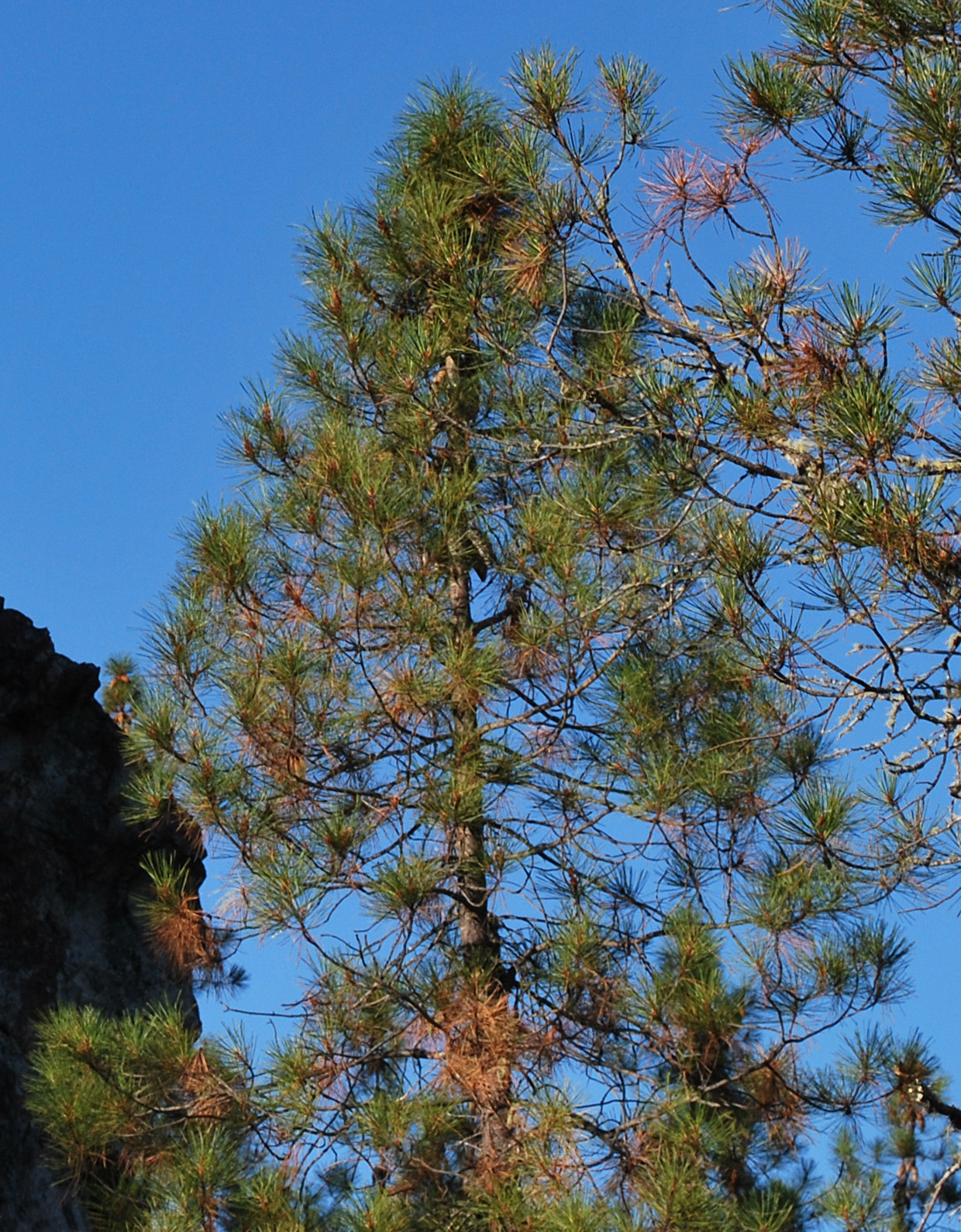

Conservation status
- Least Concern (IUCN 3.1)

Scientific classification
- Kingdom: Plantae
- Clade: Tracheophytes
- Clade: Gymnosperms
- Division: Pinophyta
- Class: Pinopsida
- Order: Pinales
- Family: Pinaceae
- Genus: Pinus
- Subgenus: P. subg. Pinus
- Section: P. sect. Trifoliae
- Subsection: P. subsect. Australes
- Species: P. attenuata

Binomial name
- Pinus attenuata Lemmon
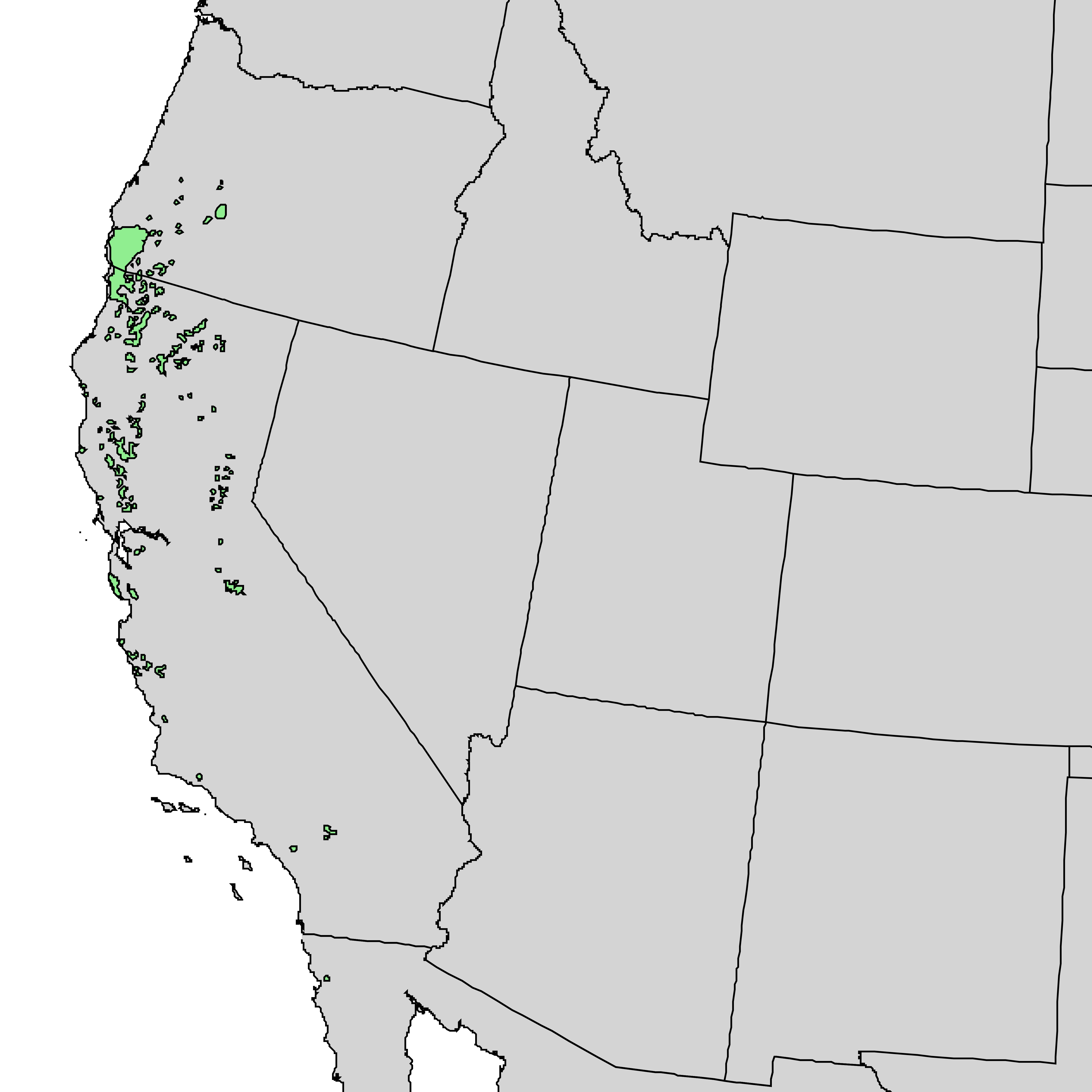

Synonyms
- Pinus tuberculata

= Knobcone pine =

Pine tree found in North America

Pinus attenuata, the knobcone pine, is a species of conifer in the family Pinaceae, a pine tree that grows in mild climates on poor soils. It is native from the mountains of southern Oregon to Baja California with the greatest concentration in northern California and the Oregon-California border.

== Description ==
Individual specimens can live up to a century. The crown is usually conical with a straight trunk. It reaches heights of 8–24 meters (26–79 feet), but can be a shrub on especially poor sites. The bark is thin and smooth, flaky and gray-brown when young, becoming dark gray-red-brown and shallowly furrowed into flat scaly ridges in age. The twigs are red-brown and often resinous. Its wood is knotty and of little interest for lumber.

The leaves are in fascicles of three, needle-like, yellow-green, twisted, and 9–15 centimeters (3 1/2–6 in) long. The cones are resin-sealed and irregularly shaped, 8–16 cm (3 1/4–6 1/4 in) long and clustered in whorls of three to six on the branches. The scales end in a short stout prickle. Cones can sometimes be found attached to the trunk and larger branches.

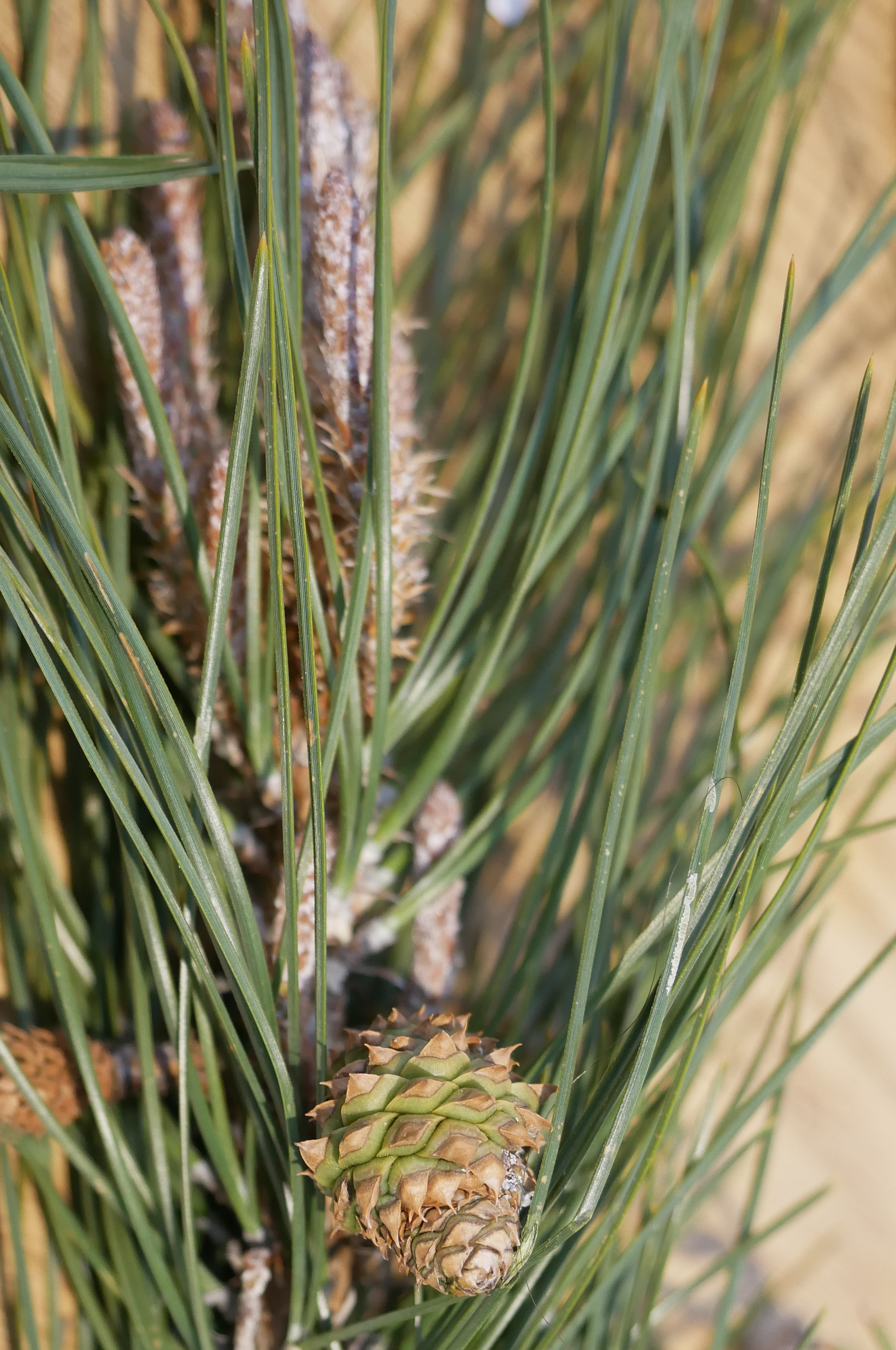
Leaves

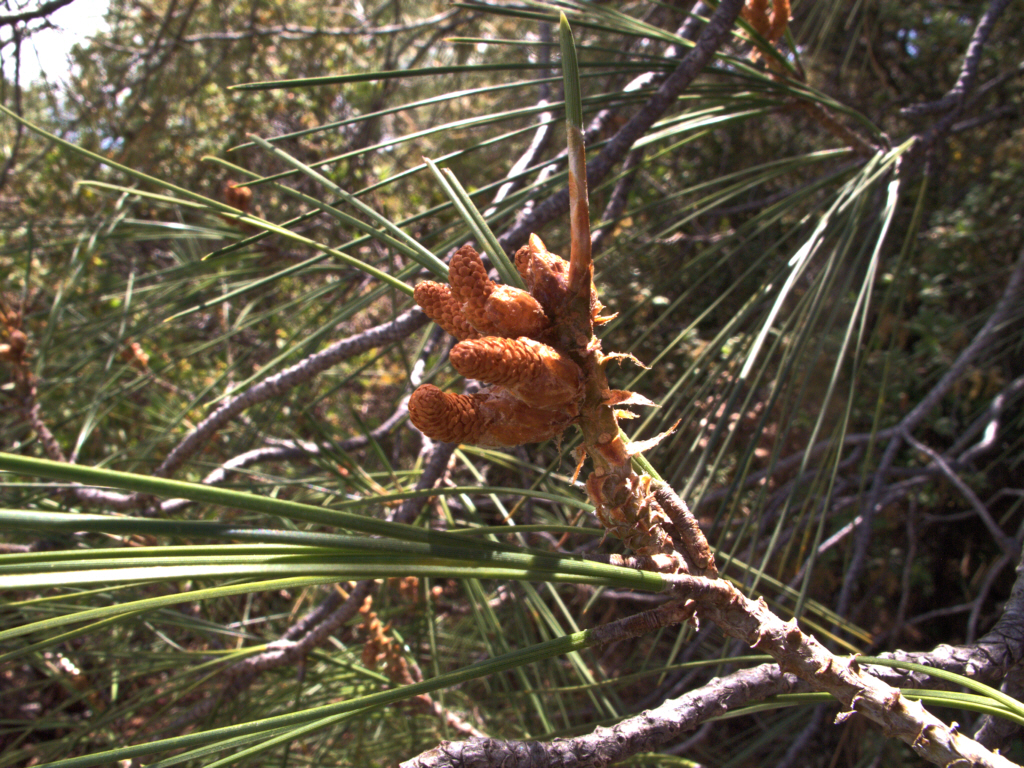
male cones

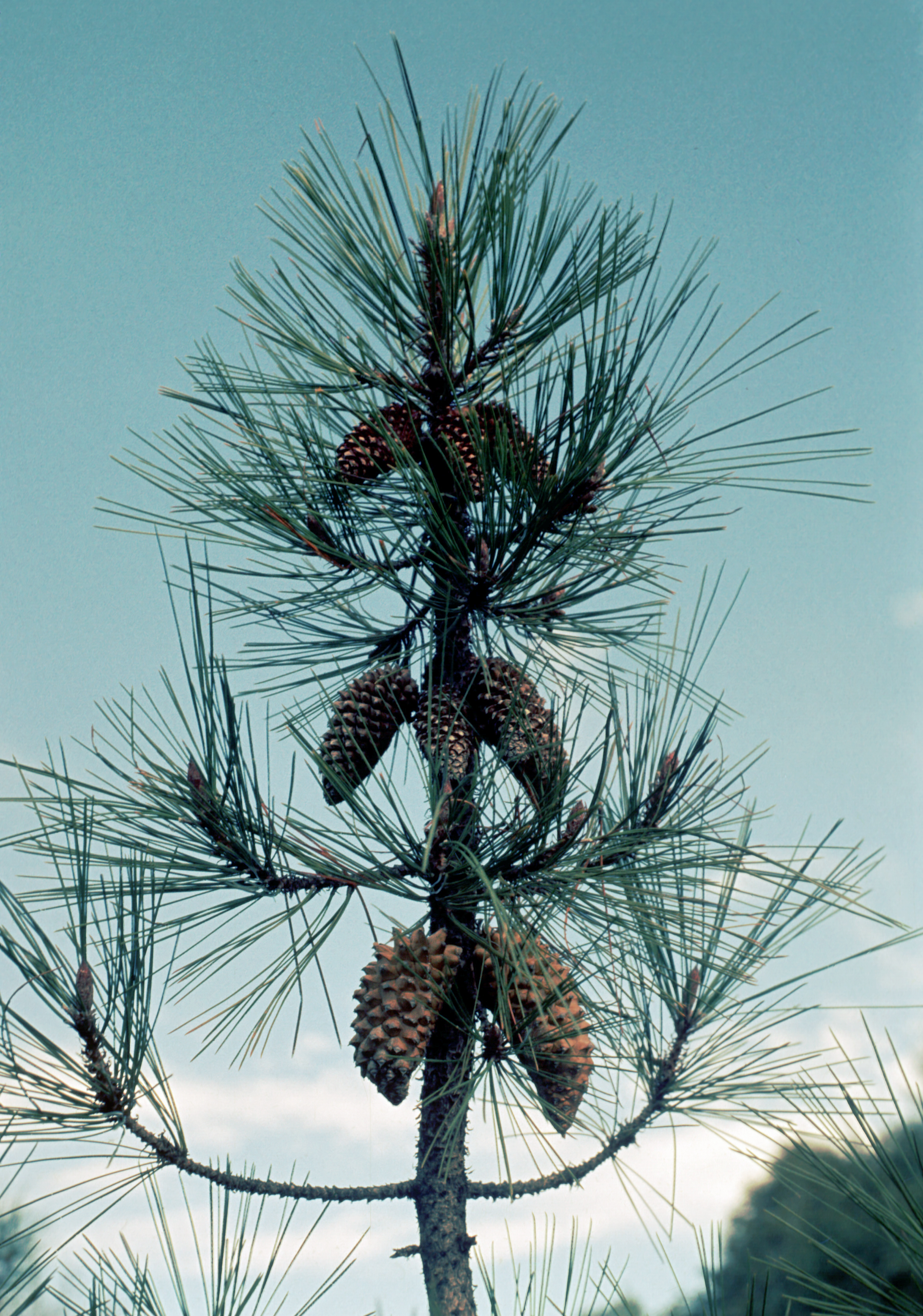
Cones

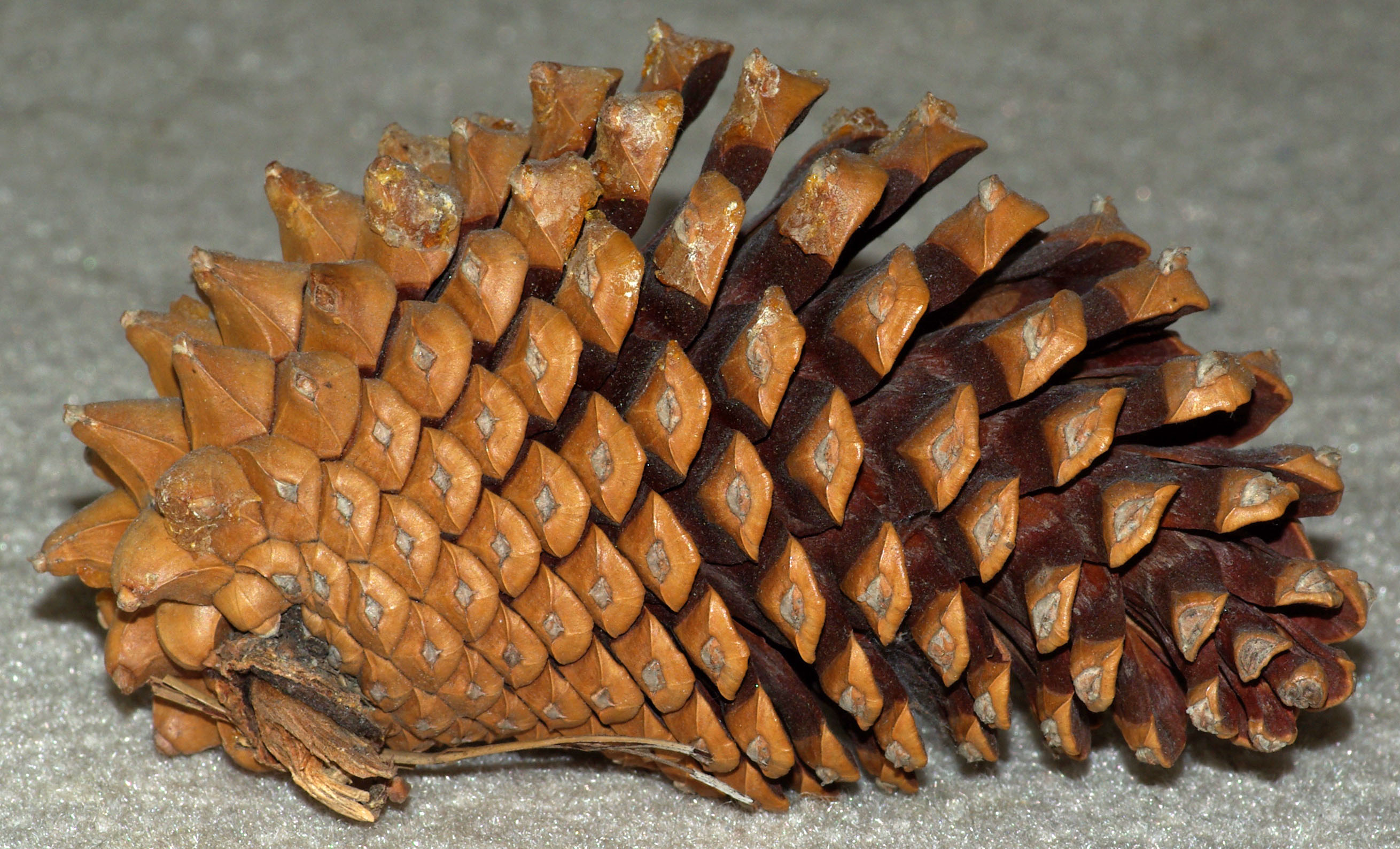
Knobcone pine cone

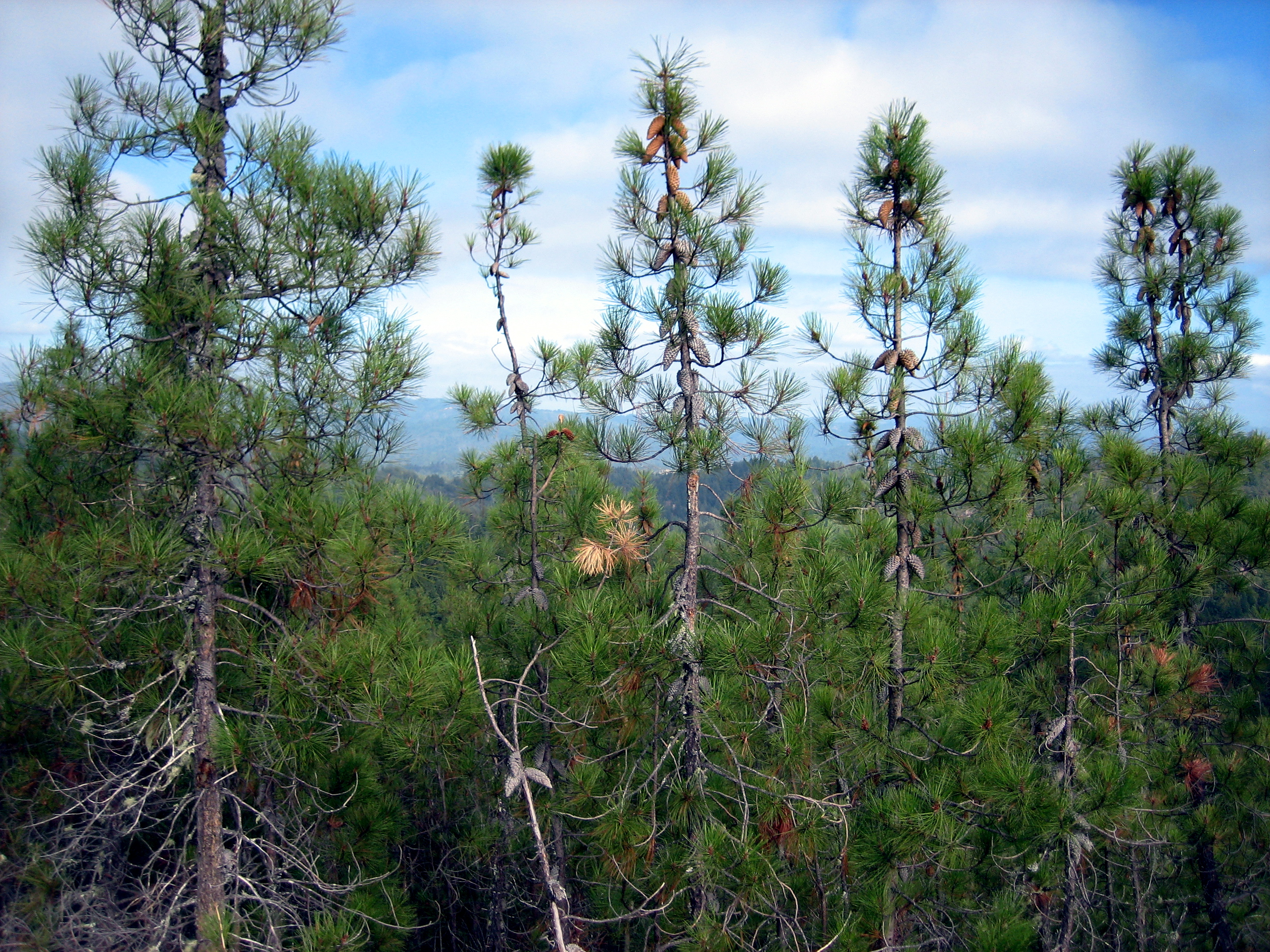
Plant

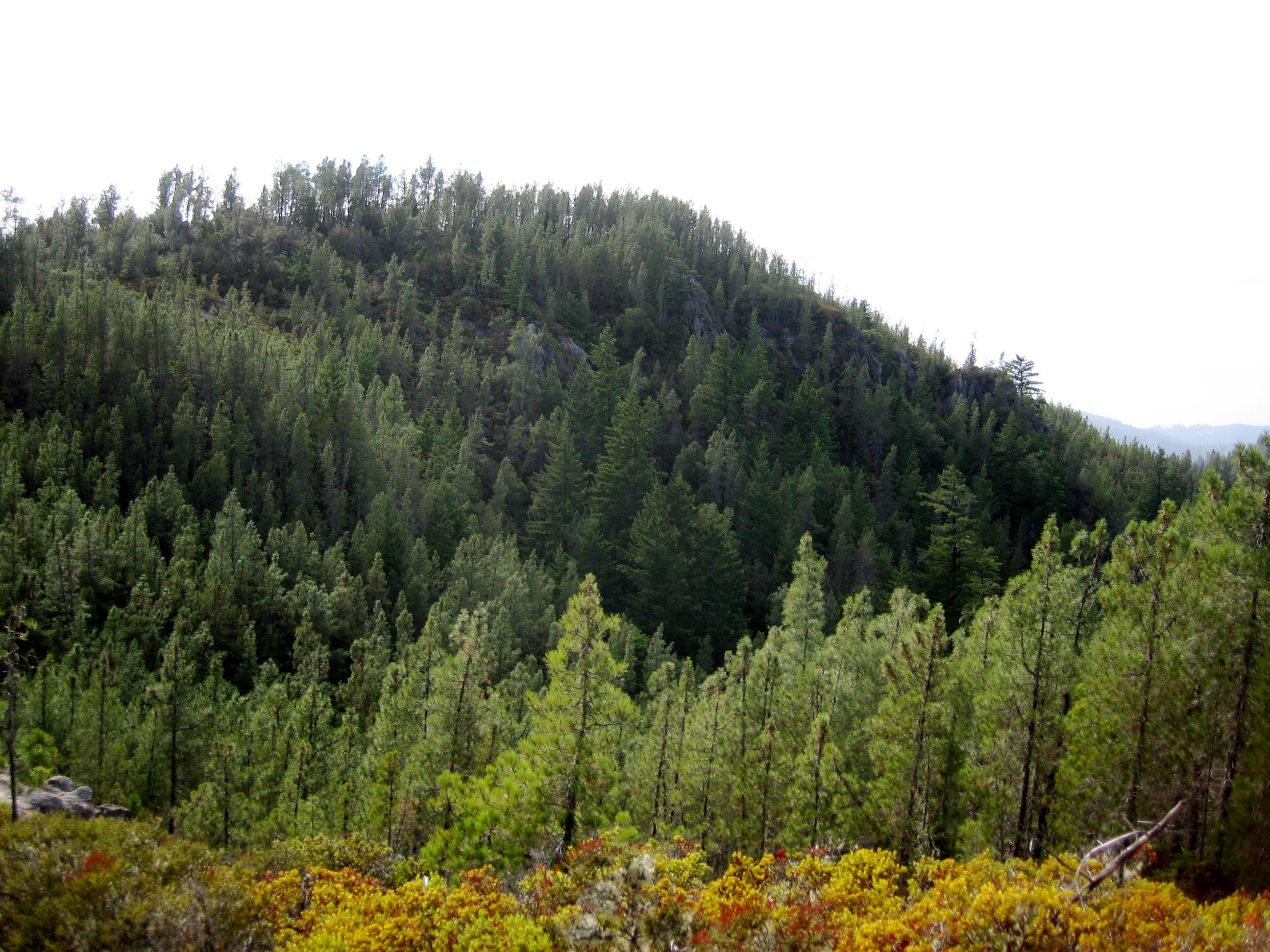
Habitat

== Distribution ==
The knobcone pine can be found growing in the dry, rocky soils of southern Oregon and northern California, between 300 and 750 m (980 and 2,460 ft) above sea level. It forms nearly pure stands, preferring to grow where there is no competition.

== Ecology ==
On the coast, the knobcone pine may hybridize with bishop pine (Pinus muricata), and Monterey pine (Pinus radiata).

In the western foothills of the Sierra Nevada, knobcone pine is often a co-dominant with blue oak (Quercus douglasii).

The species is susceptible to fire, but this melts the cone resin, releasing seeds for regrowth. The species seems to be shade intolerant.

== See also ==
- Coulter pine
- Pinus sabiniana
