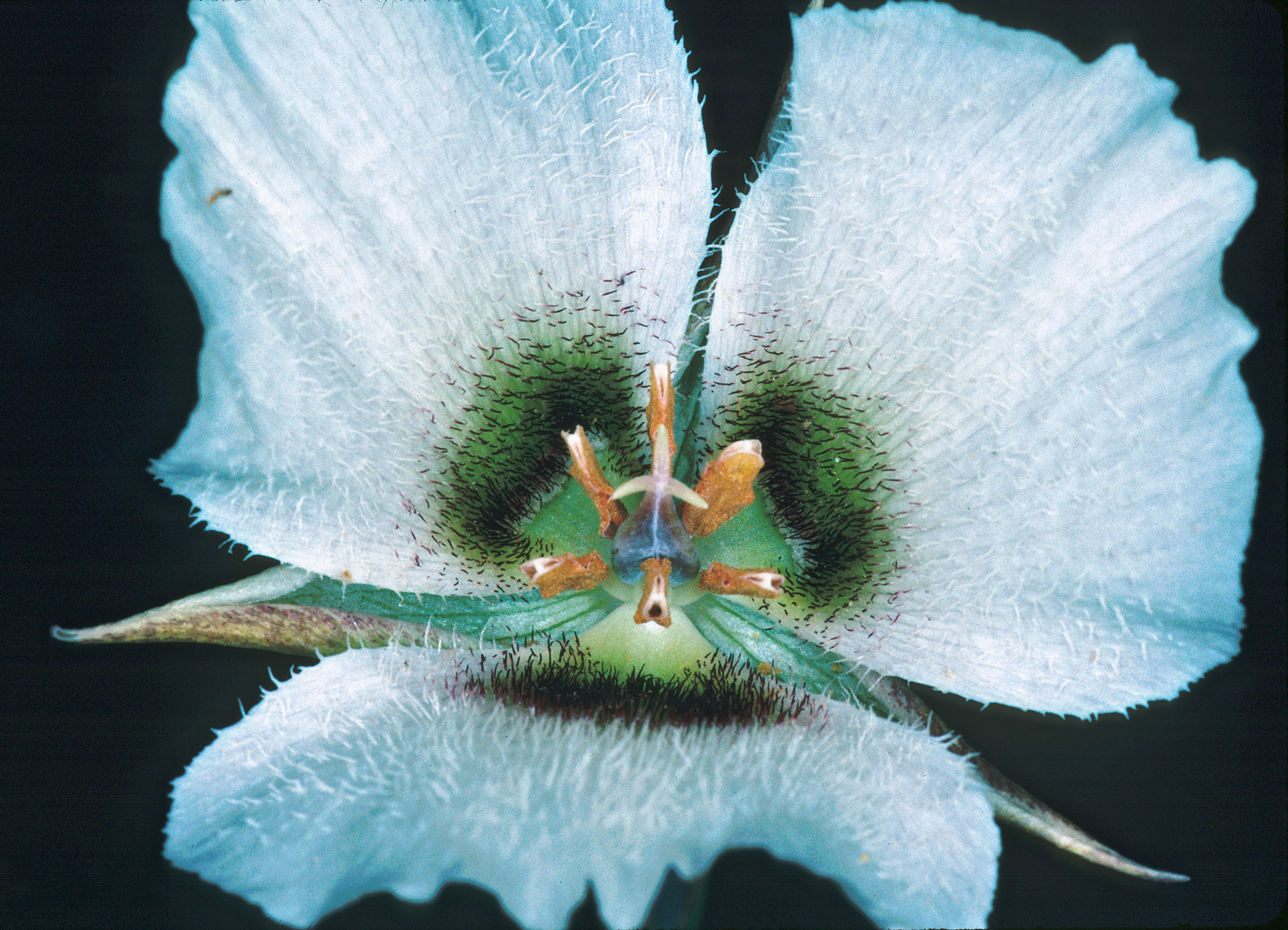

Conservation status
- Vulnerable (NatureServe)

Scientific classification
- Kingdom: Plantae
- Clade: Tracheophytes
- Clade: Angiosperms
- Clade: Monocots
- Order: Liliales
- Family: Liliaceae
- Genus: Calochortus
- Species: C. howellii

Binomial name
- Calochortus howellii S.Wats.

= Calochortus howellii =

Species of flowering plant

Calochortus howellii, or Howell's mariposa lily, is a rare North American species of flowering plants in the lily family, found only in Josephine and Curry Counties in south-western Oregon.

Calochortus howellii is a bulb-forming perennial with straight stems up to 40 cm tall. Petals are white or pale yellow with purple hairs on the petals. It grows on serpentine outcrops at lower or middle elevations.
