= List of native Oregon plants =

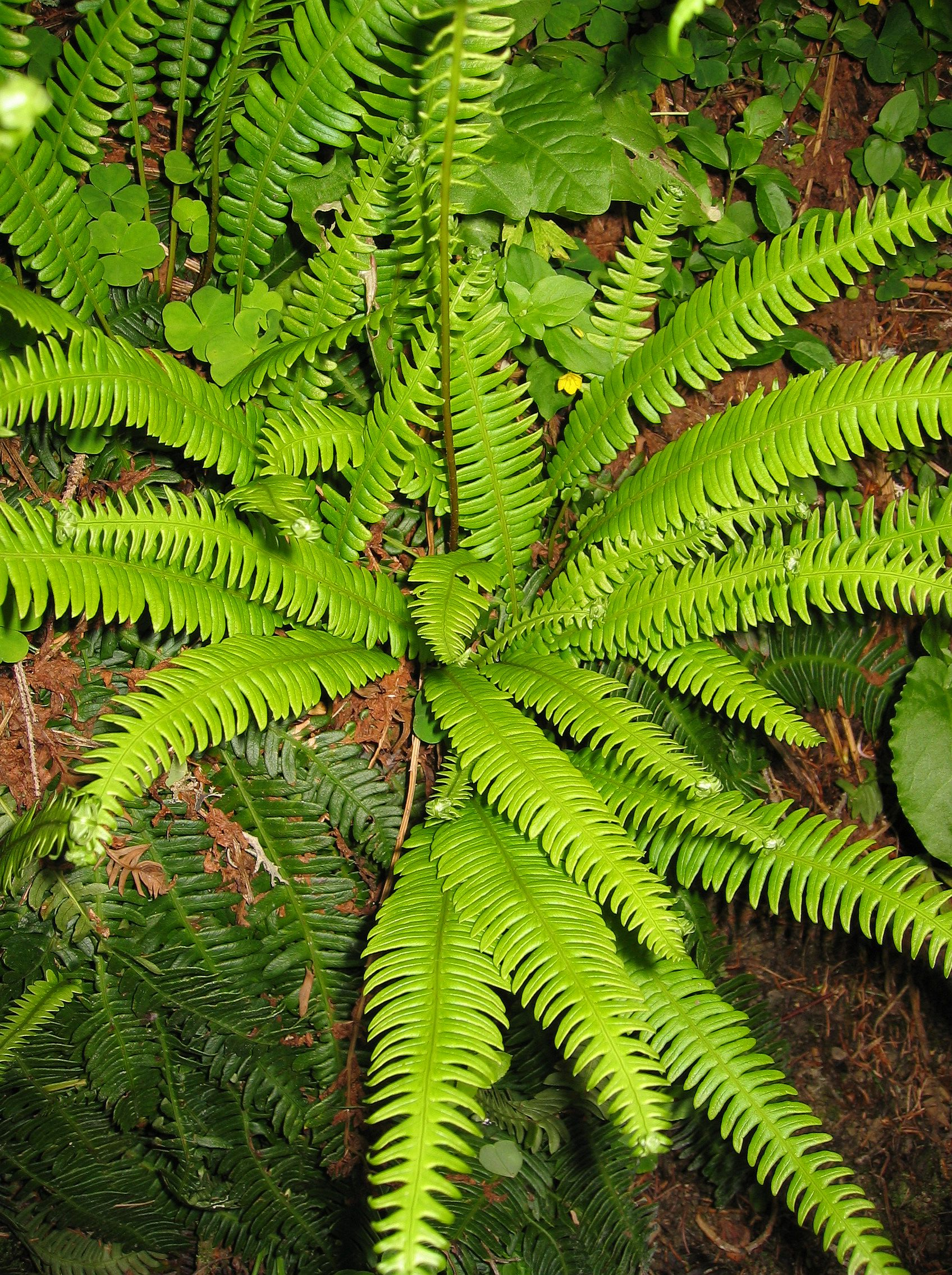
Deer fern

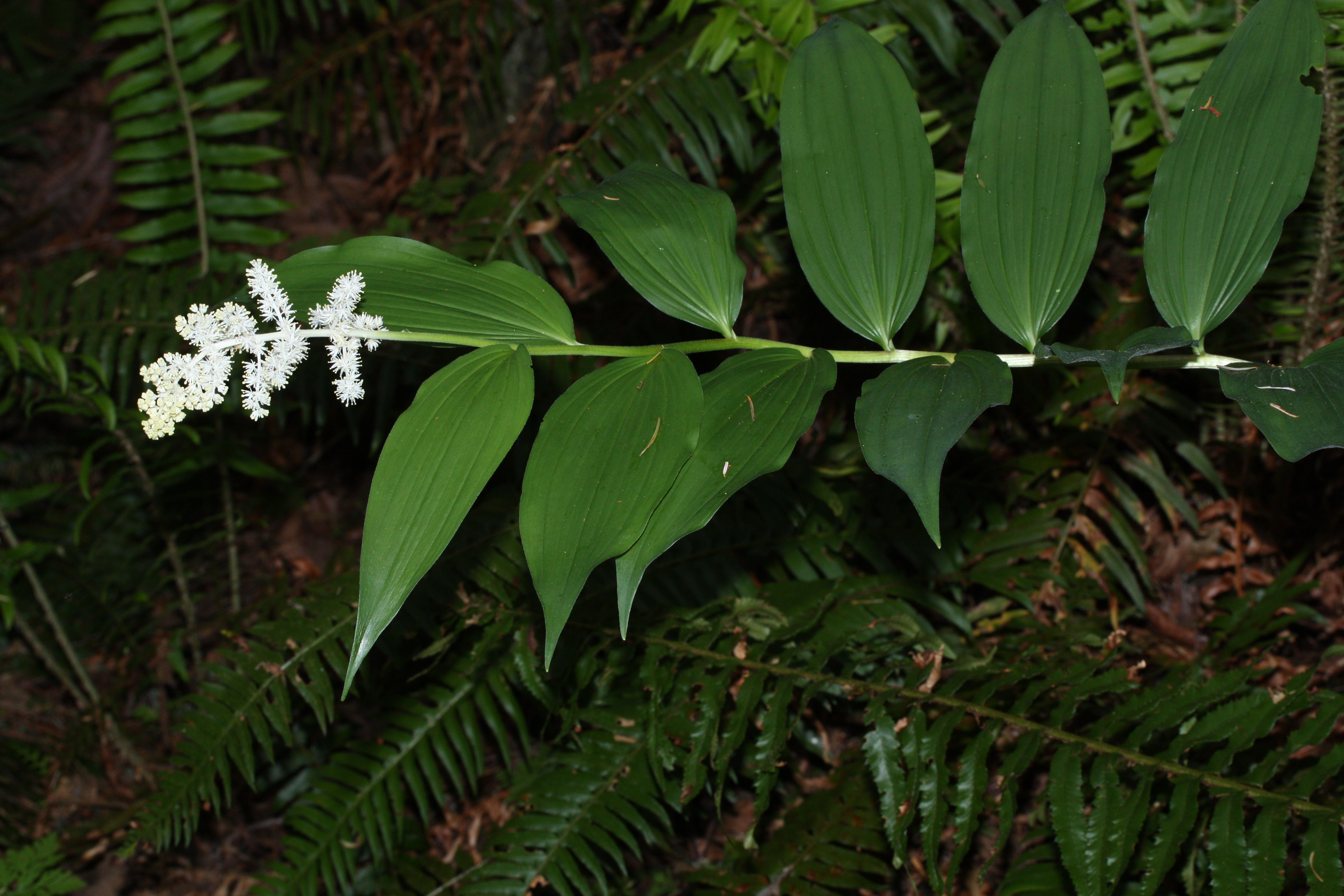
False Solomon's seal

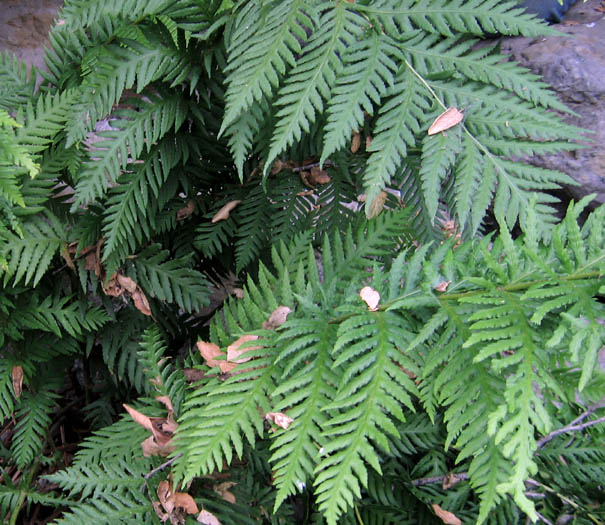
Giant chain fern

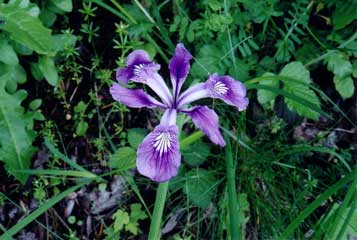
Oregon iris

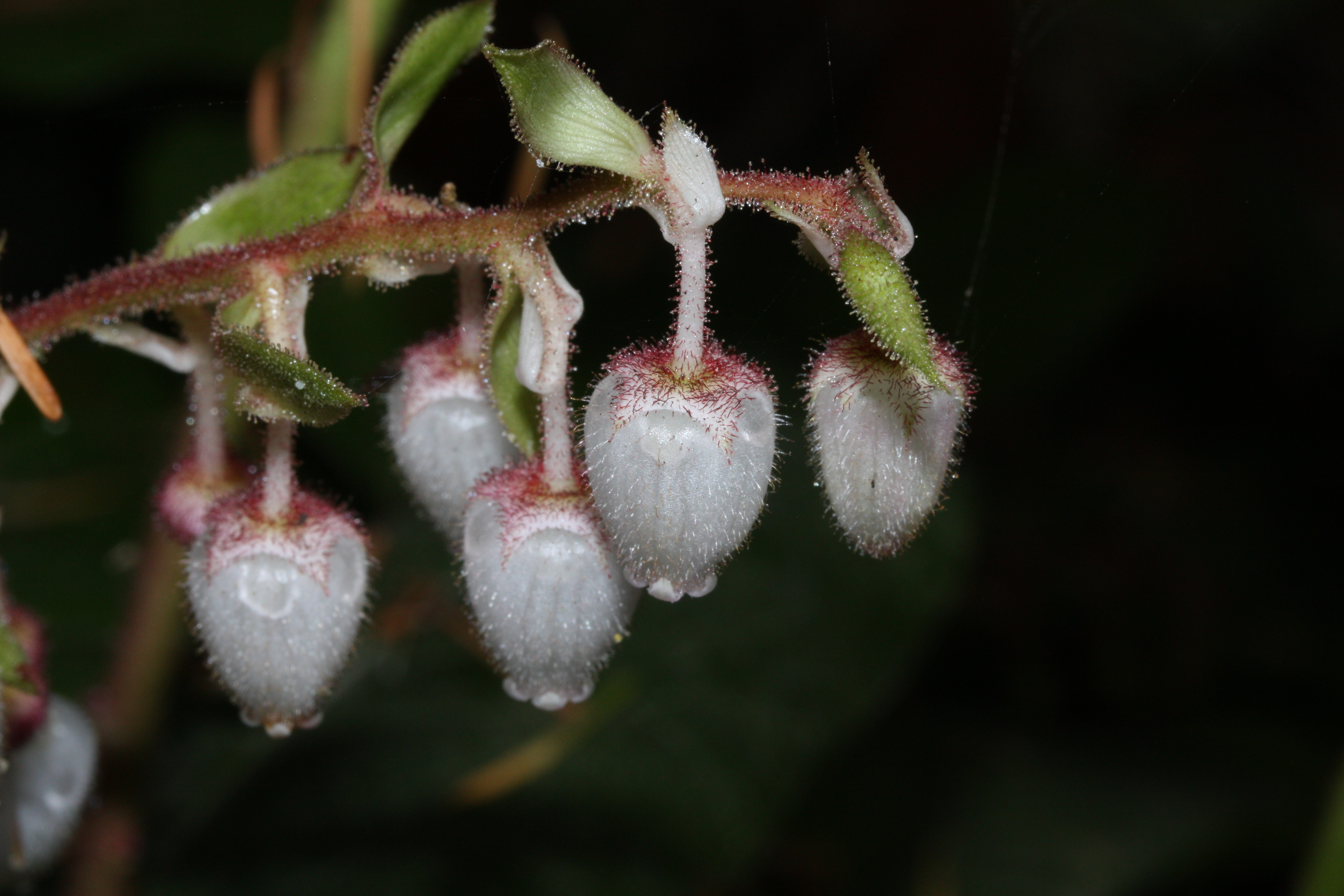
Salal

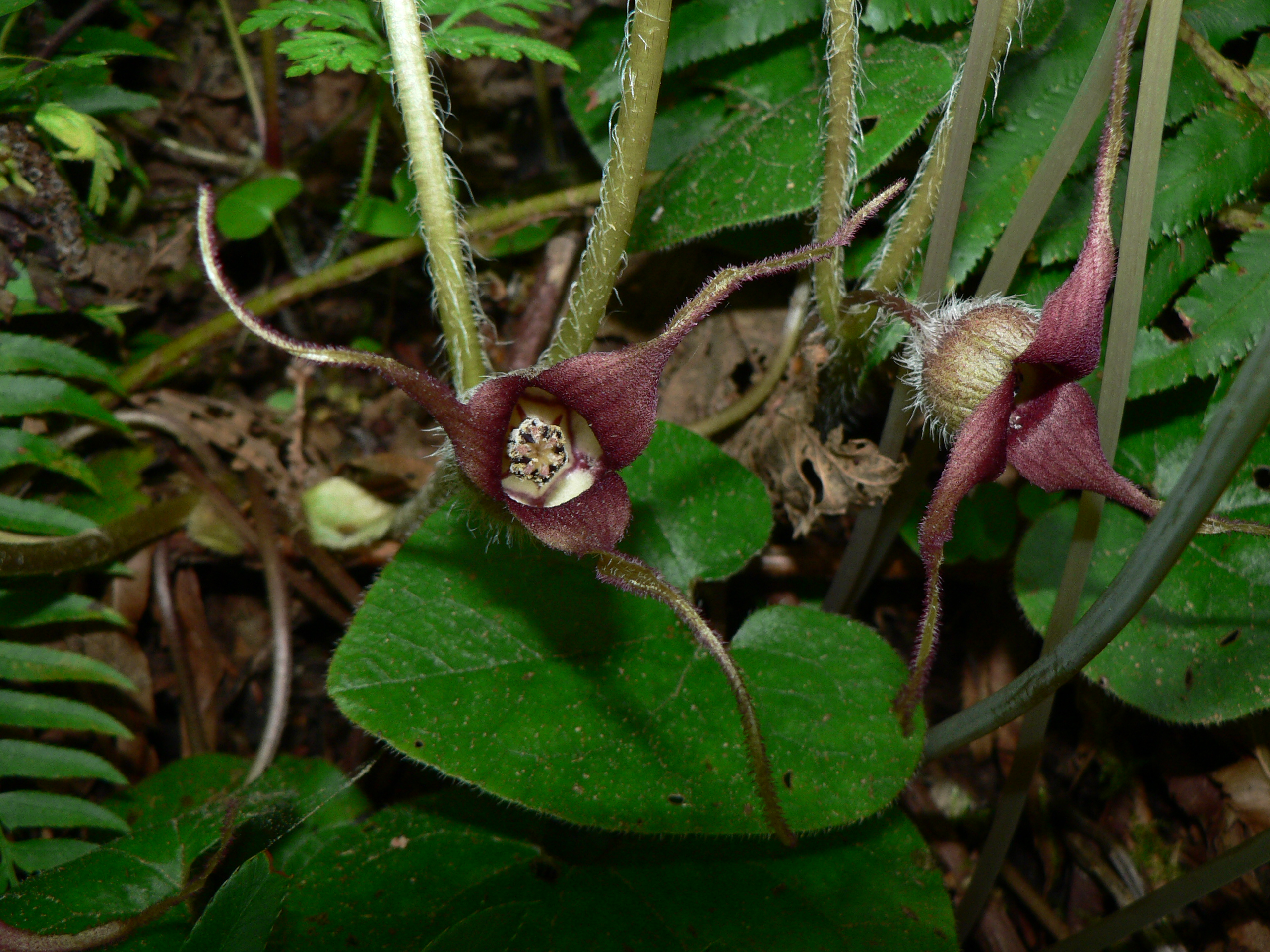
Wild ginger

This is a list of plants by common name that are native to the U.S. state of Oregon.

- Adobe parsley
- Alaska blueberry
- American wild carrot
- Austin's popcornflower
- Awned melic
- Azalea
- Azure penstemon
- Baby blue eyes
- Baldhip rose
- Beach strawberry
- Beach wormwood
- Beaked hazel
- Bearded lupine
- Bensoniella
- Bigleaf maple
- Bigleaf sedge
- Birdnest buckwheat
- Birthroot, western trillium
- Bitter cherry
- Bleeding heart
- Blow-wives
- Blue elderberry
- Bog Labrador tea
- Bolander's lily
- Bridges' cliffbreak
- Brook wakerobin
- Brown dogwood
- Buckbrush
- Bugle hedgenettle
- Bunchberry
- California broomrape
- California buttercup
- California canarygrass
- California goldfields
- California milkwort
- California phacelia
- California stoneseed
- California wild rose
- Camas
- Canary violet
- Canyon gooseberry
- Cascara
- Castle Lake bedstraw
- Charming centaury
- Chinese caps
- Citrus fawn lily
- Coastal cryptantha
- Coastal sand-verbena
- Coastal sneezeweed
- Coastal woodfern
- Cobra lily
- Cobwebby thistle
- Cook's lomatium
- Common agrimony
- Common star lily
- Copperbush
- Creamcups
- Cream stonecrop
- Crimson columbine
- Crown brodiaea
- Cusick's giant hyssop
- Cusick's stickweed
- Daggerpod
- Davy mannagrass
- Deer fern
- Del Norte pea
- Desert Indian paintbrush
- Douglas-fir
- Douglas iris
- Douglas' silverpuffs
- Douglas' stitchwort
- Douglas' violet
- Downy pincushionplant
- Dusky onion
- Dutchman's breeches
- Dwarf ceanothus
- Dwarf Oregon-grape
- Eelgrass
- Elegant brodiaea
- Engelmann spruce
- English sundew
- Evergreen huckleberry
- False lily-of-the-valley
- False Solomon seal
- Firecracker flower
- Forest clover
- Frigid shooting star
- Fringecup
- Gambel's dwarf milkvetch
- Giant blazingstar
- Giant chain fern
- Giant purple wakerobin
- Glandular yellow phacelia
- Goldeneggs
- Goldenfleece
- Golden inside-out flower
- Gorman's buttercup
- Grand fir
- Gray chickensage
- Gray's biscuitroot
- Gray's catchfly
- Grants Pass willowherb
- Grasswidows
- Greene's popcornflower
- Ground rose
- Grouseberry
- Hardhack, Douglas' spirea
- Hasse's vetch
- Henderson's angelica
- Hollyleaf pincushionplant
- Horsetail, scouring rush horsetail
- Howell's saxifrage
- Huckleberry oak
- Hupa gooseberry
- Idaho trillium, round leaf trillium
- Incense-cedar mistletoe
- Indian celery
- Indian pipe
- Indian warrior
- Jaumea
- Jaynes Canyon buckwheat
- Juniper
- Juniper mistletoe
- Kalmiopsis
- Kellogg's monkeyflower
- Kellogg's umbrellawort
- Kincaid's lupine
- Kinnikinnick
- Klamath fawn lily
- Klamath sedge
- Lady fern
- Leafy fleabane
- Leiberg's clover
- Lemon balm
- Lewis' mock-orange
- Licorice fern
- Little false Solomon seal
- MacFarlane's four-o'clock
- Madrone
- Maidenhair fern
- Malheur wirelettuce
- Manzanita
- Mapleleaf checkerbloom
- Marigold pincushionplant
- Marsh violet
- Mendocino gentian
- Miner's lettuce
- Mojave pincushion
- Mountain pride
- Naked mariposa lily
- Nakedsteam phacelia
- Narrowpetal wakerobin
- Nevada bluegrass
- Nevada lupine
- Nootka reedgrass
- Nootka rose
- North Umpqua kalmiopsis
- Notchleaf clover
- Northwestern yellowflax
- Ocean spray
- Orange honeysuckle
- Oregon false goldenaster
- Oregon iris
- Oregon-grape
- Oregon manroot
- Oregon mock-orange
- Oregon myrtle
- Oregon oxalis
- Oregon western rosinweed
- Oregon white oak
- Osoberry, Indian plum
- Pacific coralroot
- Pacific ninebark
- Pacific rhododendron
- Paper birch
- Parish's nightshade
- Piggyback plant
- Pinemat manzanita
- Pink honeysuckle
- Pink spineflower
- Pinto violet
- Playa phacelia
- Poison oak
- Ponderosa pine
- Port Orford cedar
- Prettyface
- Prostrate buckwheat
- Pygmy rose
- Radishroot woodsorrel
- Rayless ragwort
- Red alder
- Red clintonia
- Red flowering currant
- Red huckleberry
- Redwood pea
- Roseflower stonecrop
- Red osier dogwood
- Ribbed fringepod
- Round-leaved sundew
- Royal rein orchid
- Rusty popcornflower
- Sagebrush
- Salal
- Salmonberry
- Salmon polemonium
- Sanborn's onion
- San Diego raspberry
- Serpentine arnica
- Serviceberry
- Shadscale
- Shaggy hawkweed
- Shasta knotweed
- Sheldon's sedge
- Shieldleaf
- Shore pine
- Shorthair reedgrass
- Short-podded thelypody
- Sierra gooseberry
- Sierra willow
- Silky horkelia
- Silver lupine
- Silver sagebrush
- Siskiyou bluecurls
- Siskiyou false hellebore
- Siskiyou fleabane
- Siskiyou fritillary
- Siskiyou lewisia
- Siskiyou mariposa lily
- Snowberry
- Snow plant
- Splithair Indian paintbrush
- Spring draba
- Spurry buckwheat
- Stemless dwarf cudweed
- Sticky currant
- Sticky monkeyflower
- Stingining phacelia
- Swamp rose
- Sword fern
- Thimbleberry
- Torrey's blue-eyed Mary
- Trailing blackberry
- Trailing gooseberry
- Tricolor monkeyflower
- Tuni
- Twinberry honeysuckle
- Twinleaf onion
- Umpqua mariposa lily
- Valley tassels
- Veatch's blazingstar
- Vine maple
- Washington lily
- Waterleaf
- Water pennywort
- Western fringed catchfly
- Western goblin
- Western hemlock
- Western lily
- Western juniper
- Western red cedar
- Western water hemlock
- Western white pine dwarf mistletoe
- Western yellow woodsorrel
- Whitestem gooseberry
- Wild crab apple
- Wild ginger
- Willamette daisy
- Woolly meadowfoam
- Woollypod milkvetch
- Yellow lady's slipper

== See also ==
- Lists of Oregon-related topics
- List of Oregon birds

== General reference ==
- Native and Naturalized Plants of Oregon
