= Daggerpod =

Daggerpod is a common name for several plants and may refer to:

- Anelsonia eurycarpa
- Phoenicaulis cheiranthoides
