= Sticky catchfly =

Sticky catchfly is a common name for several plants and may refer to:

- Silene caroliniana, native to eastern North America
- Silene koreana, native to Korea
- Silene nuda, native to California, Oregon and Nevada in North America
- Viscaria vulgaris, native to Europe
