= Sierra willow =

Sierra willow is a native shrub that grows in Central and Northern California, USA, primarily in the White and Inyo Mountains, the High Sierra Nevada and Sierra Nevada East regions. It is fast growing and moderately long-lived. It grows in an upright form to a height of 10 feet (3.0 m), with active growth during the spring and summer. Flowers are yellow and bloom in the mid-spring. Leaves are medium green and deciduous. It tends to grow in meadows and wet places. Sierra Willow is a common name for several plants and may refer to:

- Salix eastwoodiae
- Salix orestera
