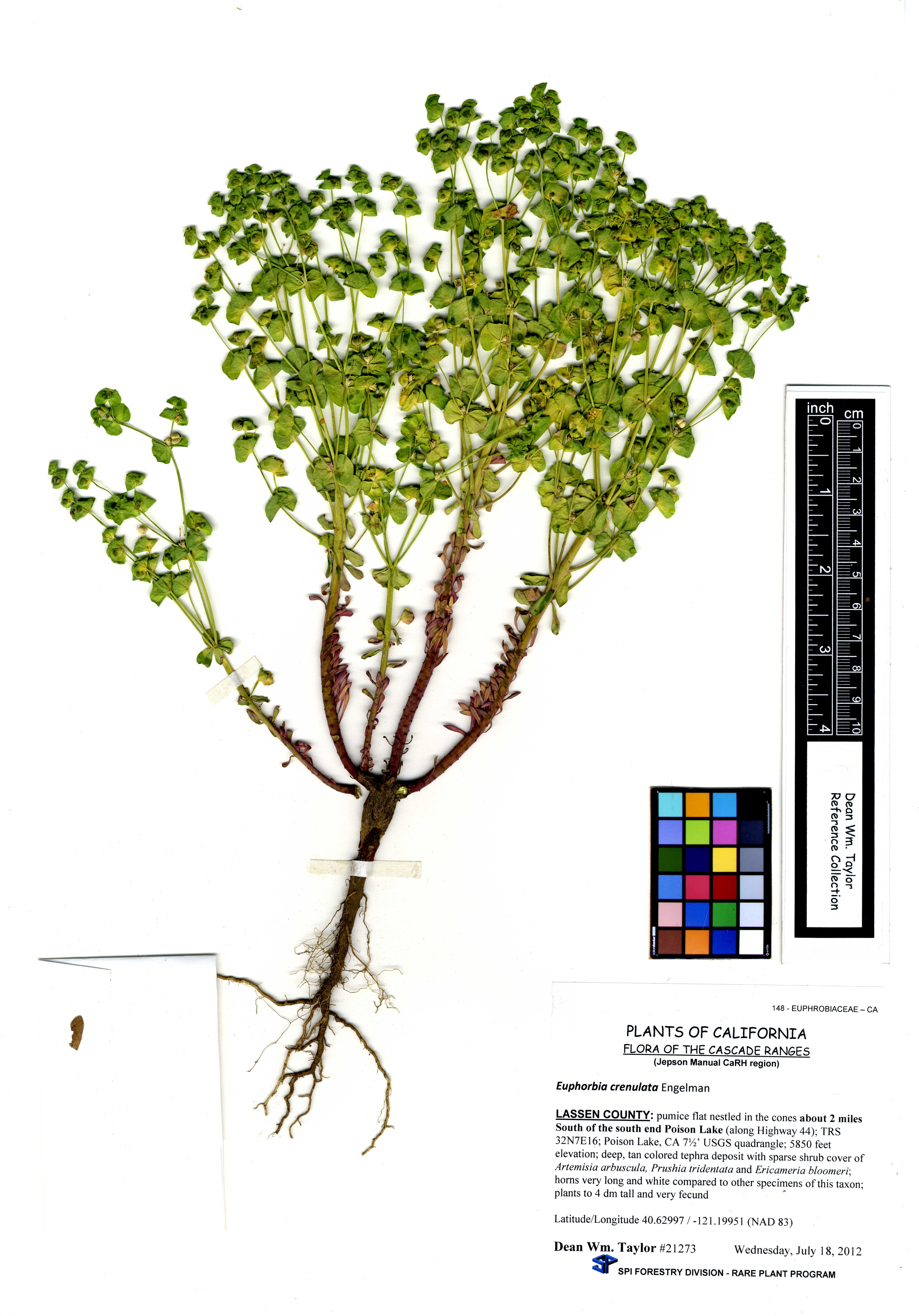

Conservation status
- Secure (NatureServe)

Scientific classification
- Kingdom: Plantae
- Clade: Tracheophytes
- Clade: Angiosperms
- Clade: Eudicots
- Clade: Rosids
- Order: Malpighiales
- Family: Euphorbiaceae
- Genus: Euphorbia
- Species: E. crenulata

Binomial name
- Euphorbia crenulata Engelm.

= Euphorbia crenulata =

Species of flowering plant

Euphorbia crenulata is a species of spurge native to the western United States, especially California and Oregon. Its common name is beetle spurge. It blooms between May and August.

== Description ==
Its leaves vary in shape and size but they often curve up and come together to form a bowl shape. The small fruits are green, fleshy, and lobed. The flower has two distinct horns.

== Phylogeny and Taxonomy ==
According to the Catalogue of Life, there are 2,129 accepted species within Euphorbia. E. crenulata belongs to Euphorbia sect. Tithymalus along with 31 other species, including the petty spurge (E. peplus). E. crenulata closely resembles the European E. peplus. They differ only in seed pitting characteristics and lower leaf petioles.

Euphorbia sect. Tithymalus
Phylogeny of Euphorbia sect. Tithymalus based on a 2014 review of plastid DNA sequences.

- - - - (9 species)
      - (7 species)
      - (3 species)
    - - - - - - E. austrotexana — south Texas spurge (south Texas plains)
              - E. longicruris — wedgeleaf spurge (Edwards Plateau, north-central Texas, and eastern part of Plains Country of Texas; Oklahoma & Mexico)
            - E. roemeriana — Roemer's spurge (endemic to Eastern part of the Edwards Plateau of Texas)
          - E. ouachitana — Ouachita spurge (Ouachita and Ozark mountains in eastern North America)
          - E. tetrapora — weak spurge (S. Oklahoma to Central Louisiana)
        - E. commutata — tinted woodland spurge (eastern North America)
      - E. crenulata beetle spurge (S. Oregon to California, SW. Colorado to NW. New Mexico)
  - E. peplus — petty spurge (Europe, northern Africa, western Asia)
- - E. herniariifolia (Mediterranean)
  - E. isaurica (southern Türkiye)
