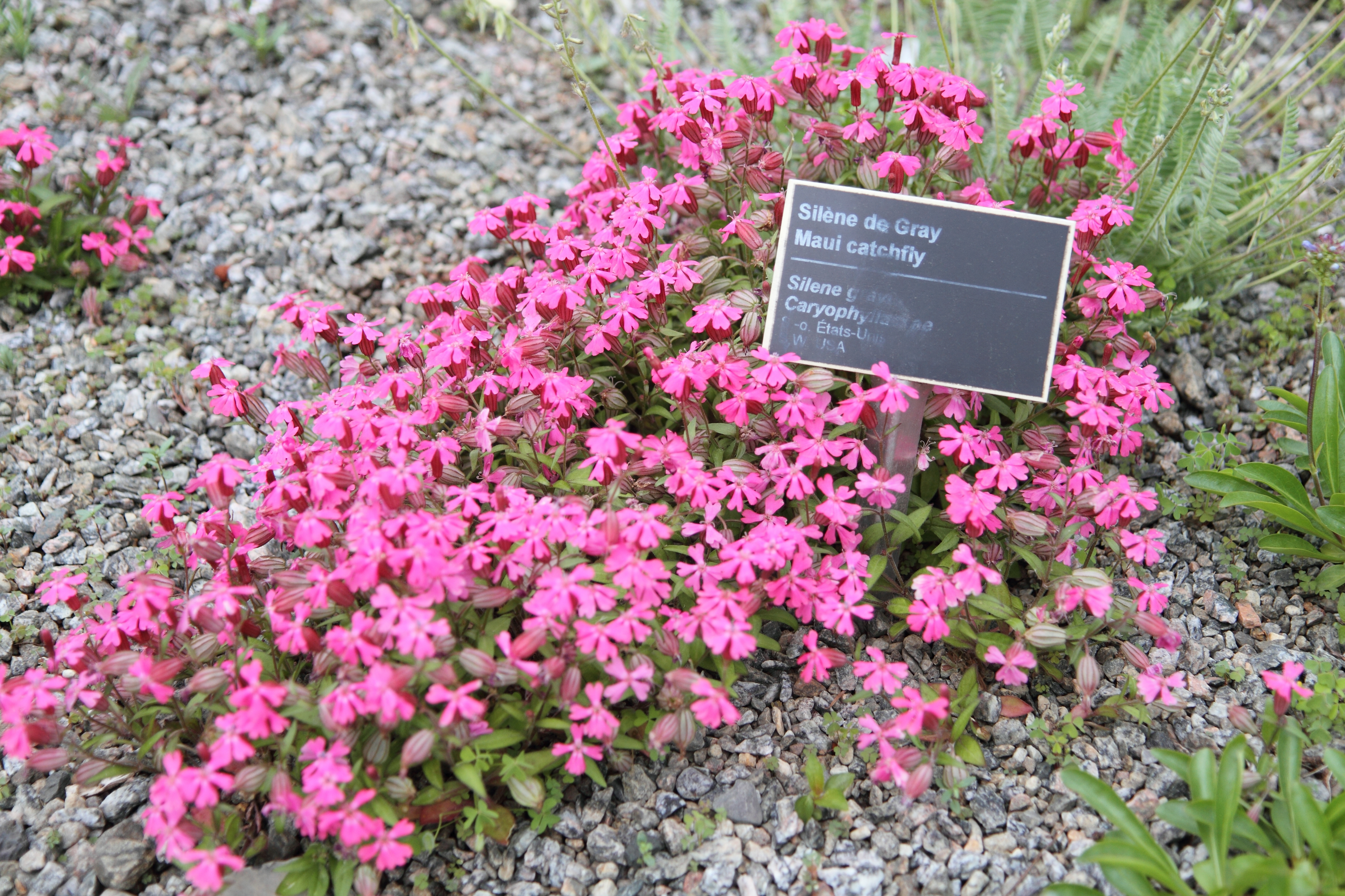

Scientific classification
- Kingdom: Plantae
- Clade: Tracheophytes
- Clade: Angiosperms
- Clade: Eudicots
- Order: Caryophyllales
- Family: Caryophyllaceae
- Genus: Silene
- Species: S. grayi

Binomial name
- Silene grayi S.Watson

= Silene grayi =

Species of flowering plant

Silene grayi is a North American species of flowering plant in the family Caryophyllaceae, known by the common name Gray's catchfly.

== Description ==
It is a perennial herb producing a decumbent or upright stem up to 20 or 30 centimetres (8 or 12 inches) long from a woody, branching caudex. The base of the plant is covered in tufts of leaves. These basal leaves are lance-shaped to nearly spoon-shaped, fleshy, and up to 4 centimeters long. Smaller, narrower leaves occur higher up the stems. Each flower has a tubular calyx of fused sepals lined with ten green or red veins and covered in glandular hairs. It is open at the tip, revealing five pink or purple petals. The petal tips and appendages are divided into narrow lobes.

== Distribution and habitat ==
It is native to the mountains of Oregon and northern California, including the Klamath Mountains, where it grows in chaparral, mountain forests, and the talus of high slopes in alpine climates.

== Ecology ==
It has been observed to occur in a plant association with oceanspray (Holodiscus microphyllus), littleleaf silverback (Luina hypoleuca), and Gray's bedstraw (Galium grayanum).
