= Euphorbia ouachitana =

Scientific classification
- Kingdom: Plantae
- Clade: Tracheophytes
- Clade: Angiosperms
- Clade: Eudicots
- Clade: Rosids
- Order: Malpighiales
- Family: Euphorbiaceae
- Genus: Euphorbia
- Species: E. ouachitana

Binomial name
- Euphorbia ouachitana M.H. Mayfield

Species of flowering plant

Euphorbia ouachitana, commonly called Ouachita spurge, is a species of flowering plant in the spurge family (Euphorbiaceae). It is native eastern to North America, where its range is restricted to the Ouachita and Ozark Mountains, with disjunct populations east in the Nashville Basin. Its typical natural habitat is semi-open forests and woodlands, usually associated with thin soils underlain by shale or limestone.

Before it was described as a separate species in 2013, it was typically considered to be the same species as Euphorbia commutata. Distinguishing characters of Euphorbia ouachitana include its annual habit, fused dichasial bracts, and red-brown seeds with pits distributed in rows.

Euphorbia ouachitana is an annual herb, growing from around 12–28 cm tall. It flowers and fruits in the spring.
