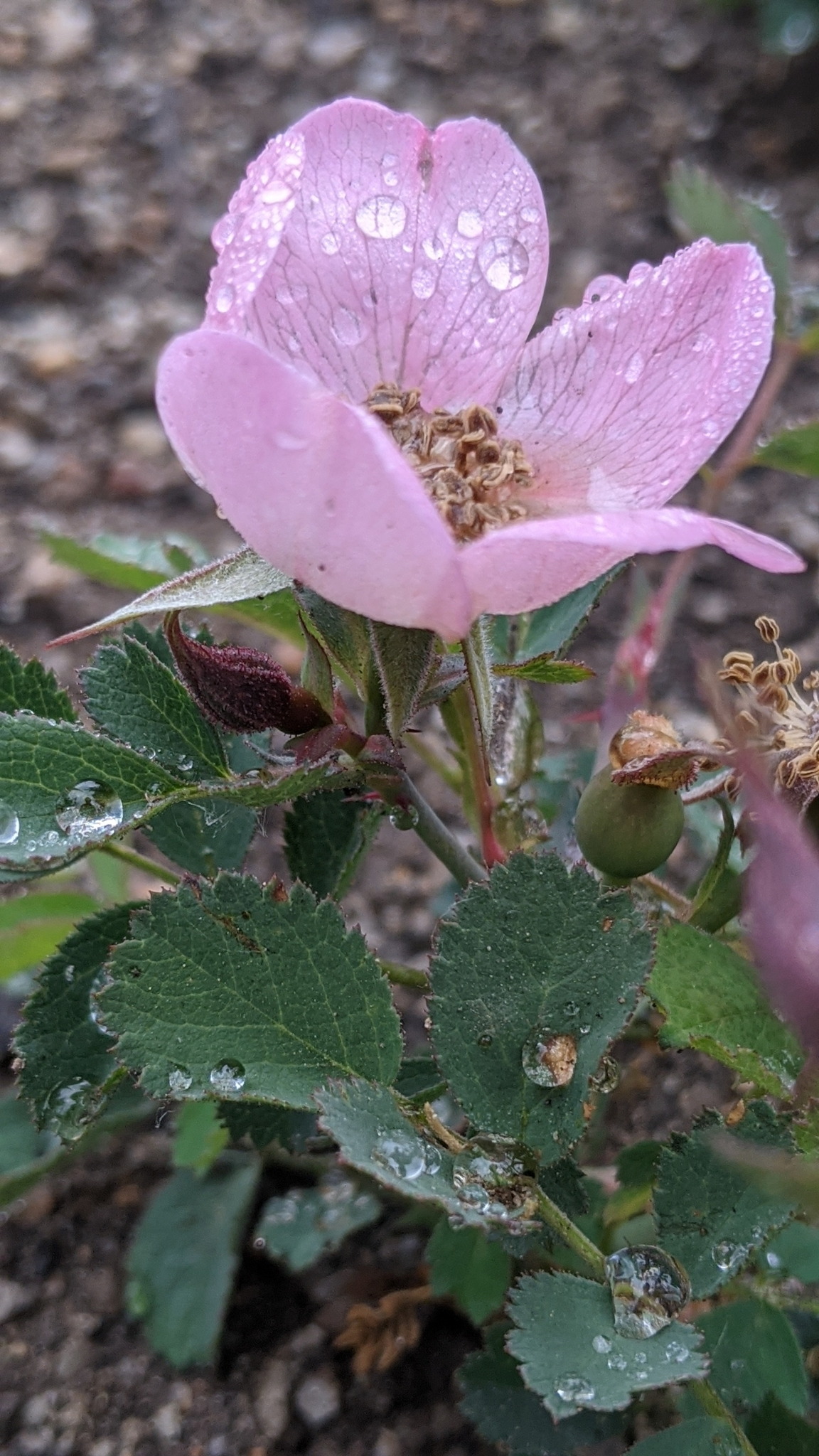

Scientific classification
- Kingdom: Plantae
- Clade: Tracheophytes
- Clade: Angiosperms
- Clade: Eudicots
- Clade: Rosids
- Order: Rosales
- Family: Rosaceae
- Genus: Rosa
- Species: R. bridgesii

Binomial name
- Rosa bridgesii Crép.

= Rosa bridgesii =

Species of flowering plant

Rosa bridgesii is a species of rose known by the common names pygmy rose and Sierran dwarf rose. It is native to California, where it grows in the forests of the Sierra Nevada and surrounding mountains and foothills. It may also occur in Oregon.

This rose is sometimes treated as a variety of Rosa gymnocarpa.

== Description ==
Rosa bridgesii is a small rhizomatous shrub growing 10 to 80 centimetres (4 to 31 1/2 in) tall. The brown stem is covered in paired prickles. The leaves are each made up of a few hairy, glandular leaflets which are oval in shape and toothed. The leaflet at the end of the leaf is up to 3 cm long and has a flat tip.

The inflorescence is a solitary flower or cyme of up to 5 flowers. The flower has five glandular sepals and five pink petals each up to 1.5 cm long. At the center are many stamens and up to 20 pistils. The fruit is a rose hip up to 1 cm wide.
