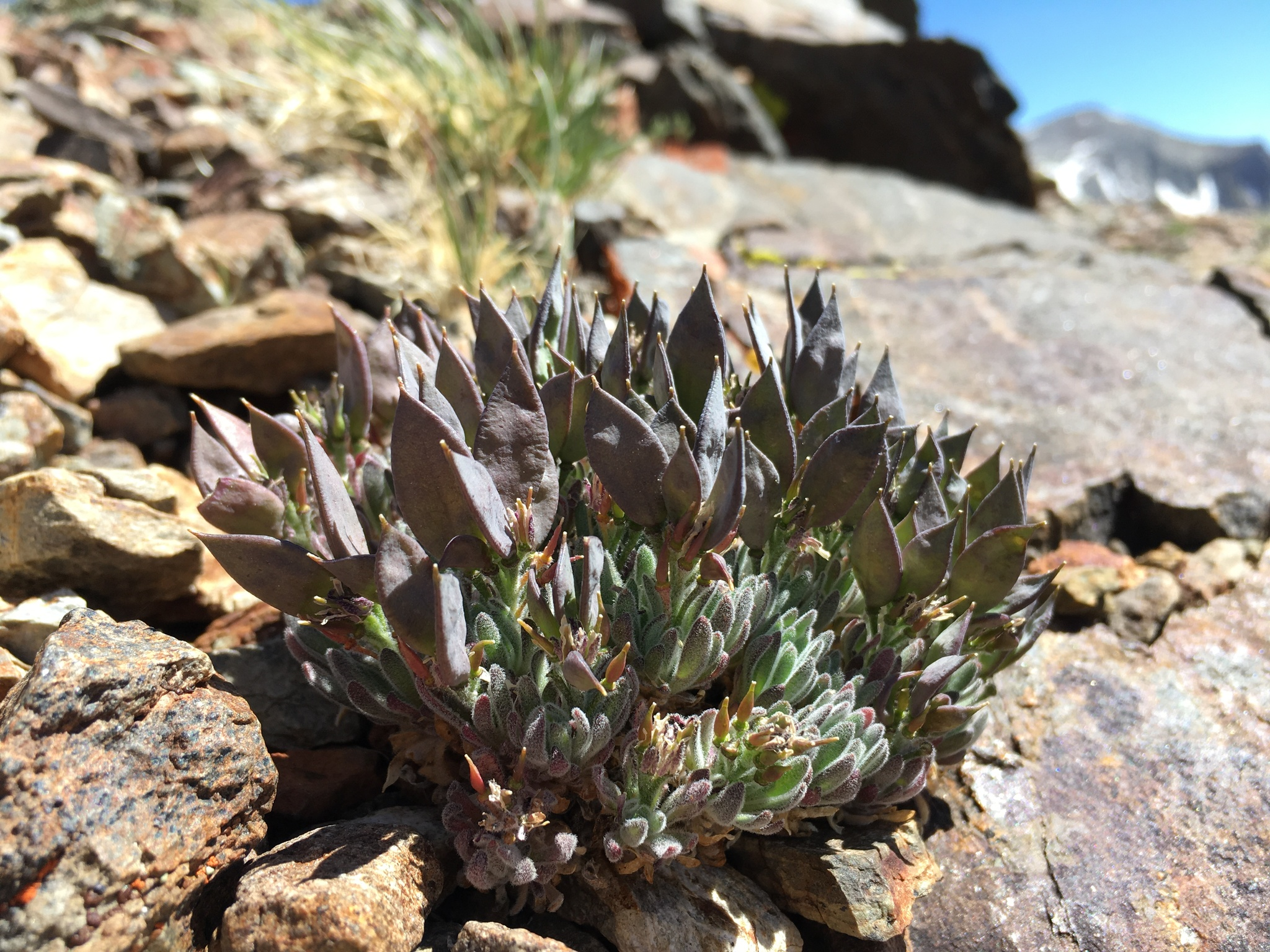

Conservation status
- Apparently Secure (NatureServe)

Scientific classification
- Kingdom: Plantae
- Clade: Tracheophytes
- Clade: Angiosperms
- Clade: Eudicots
- Clade: Rosids
- Order: Brassicales
- Family: Brassicaceae
- Genus: Anelsonia; J.F.Macbr. & Payson
- Species: A. eurycarpa

Binomial name
- Anelsonia eurycarpa (Gray) J.F.Macbr. & Payson

Synonyms
- Phoenicaulis eurycarpa

= Anelsonia =

Genus of flowering plants

Anelsonia is a monotypic genus in the family Brassicaceae containing the single species Anelsonia eurycarpa, which is known by the common name daggerpod. It is similar to Phoenicaulis cheiranthoides, but at present they are treated in separate genera. This species is a fleshy, hairy plant of mountain habitats throughout the western United States from California to Idaho and can be found from 1600 to 4100 m. Above the rosette of velvety, fingerlike leaves it bears densely packed inflorescences of tiny white flowers. The distinctive fruits develop and dwarf the rest of the plant under an array of saillike pod structures, each on a pedicel. The fruits are each 2 to 3 centimeters tall, elliptic, and papery to leathery across a span between stiff septa. They are white, often with areas of purple coloration, or brown. Within the folds of the fruit are several seeds. Anelsonia was named for the botanist Aven Nelson.

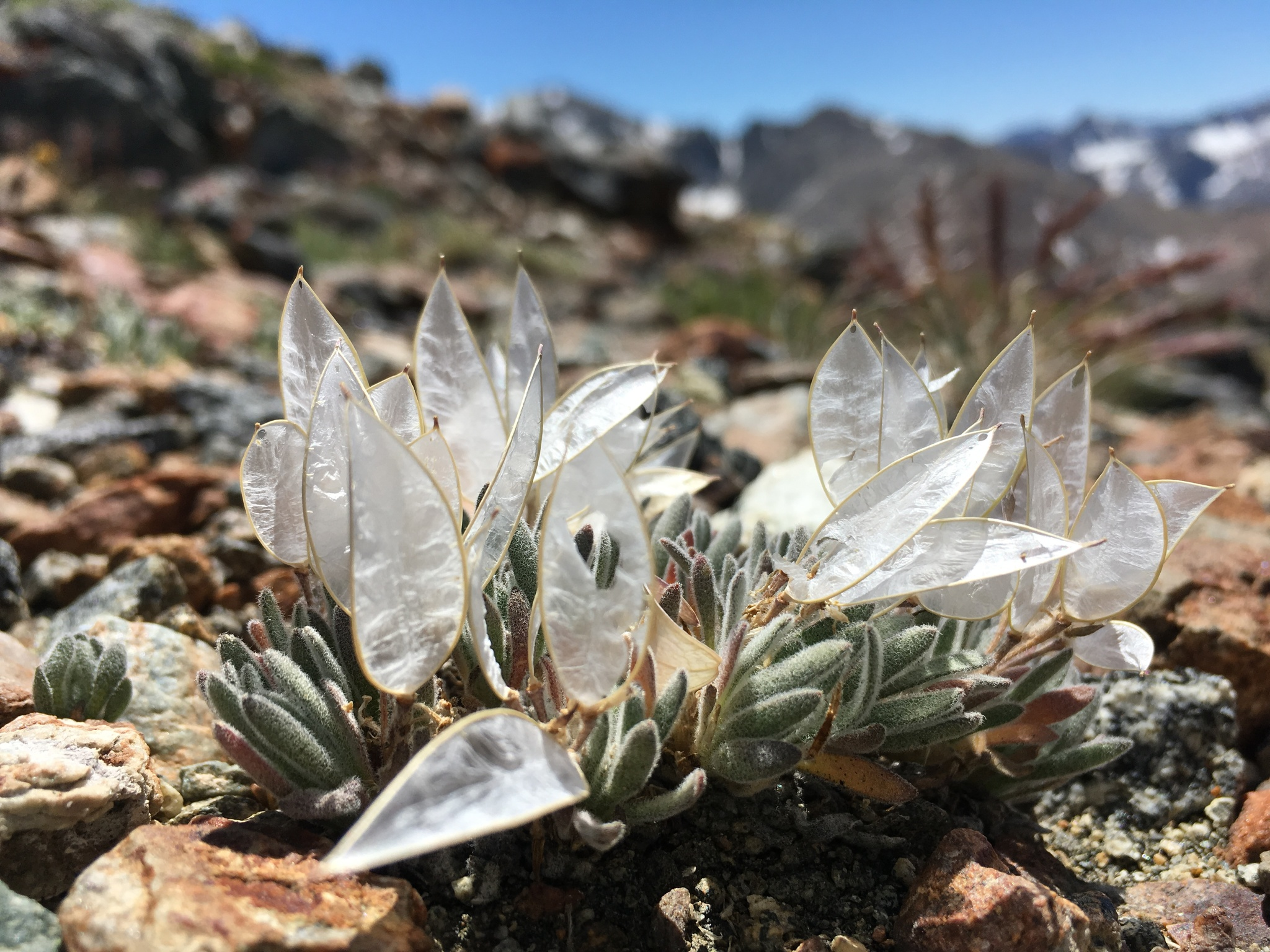
