= Rubus glaucifolius =

Scientific classification
- Kingdom: Plantae
- Clade: Embryophytes
- Clade: Tracheophytes
- Clade: Spermatophytes
- Clade: Angiosperms
- Clade: Eudicots
- Clade: Rosids
- Order: Rosales
- Family: Rosaceae
- Genus: Rubus
- Species: R. glaucifolius

Binomial name
- Rubus glaucifolius Kellogg 1873

Synonyms
- Melanobatus glaucifolius (Kellogg) Greene

Species of flowering plant

Rubus glaucifolius is a North American species of wild raspberry known by the common name San Diego raspberry.

A tangling shrub, it has very slender, lightly prickly stems that spread and branch outward. The leaves are each made up of usually three-lobed, toothed leaflets, sometimes five. Each leaflet is veined and wrinkly in texture, white on the underside because of a waxy coating along the surface, and up to 5 centimeters (2 inches) long. The inflorescence is a solitary flower or an array of a few flowers with five reflexed sepals and five white petals each about 0.5 cm long. The fruit is a lightly hairy red raspberry.

It is native to Oregon and California, where it grows in mountain forests.
