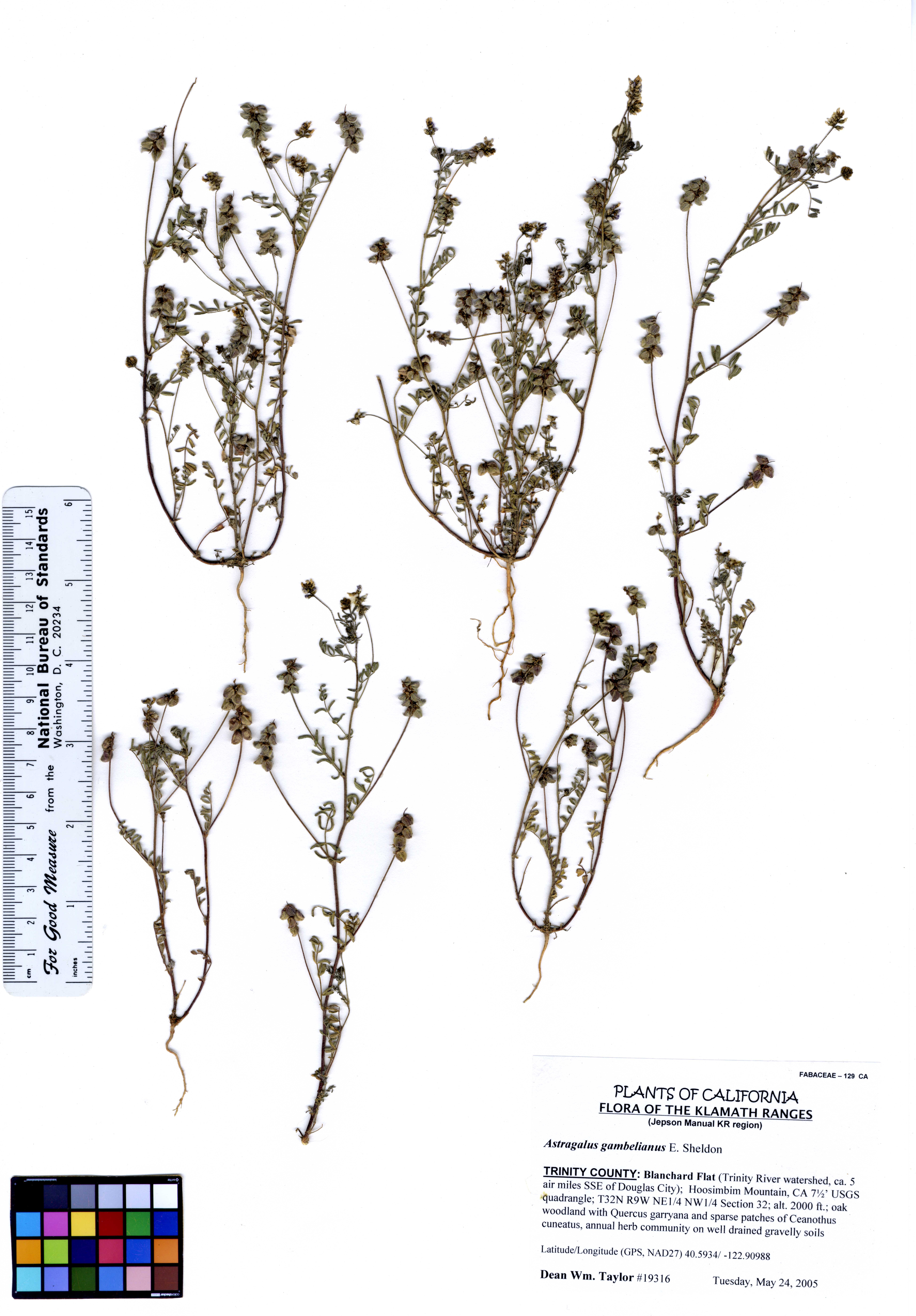

Conservation status
- Secure (NatureServe)

Scientific classification
- Kingdom: Plantae
- Clade: Tracheophytes
- Clade: Angiosperms
- Clade: Eudicots
- Clade: Rosids
- Order: Fabales
- Family: Fabaceae
- Subfamily: Faboideae
- Genus: Astragalus
- Species: A. gambelianus

Binomial name
- Astragalus gambelianus E.Sheld.

= Astragalus gambelianus =

Gambel's dwarf milkvetch

Species of legume

Astragalus gambelianus is a species of milkvetch known by the common name Gambel's dwarf milkvetch. It is native to California, with its distribution extending into Oregon to the north and Baja California to the south.

It grows in many types of habitat, including chaparral and woodlands and the Sierra Nevada.

== Description ==
Astragalus gambelianus is an annual herb with slender stems reaching a maximum of 30 centimeters long, but generally remaining shorter. A dwarf milkvetch, it is smaller than most other species of its genus. The leaves are less than 4 centimeters long and are made up of several oblong leaflets, each a few millimeters in length.

The inflorescence holds up to 15 purple-tinted white flowers, each generally less than 6 millimeters long. The herbage of the inflorescence is coated in black hairs. The fruit is a tiny rounded or oval legume pod just a few millimeters long.
