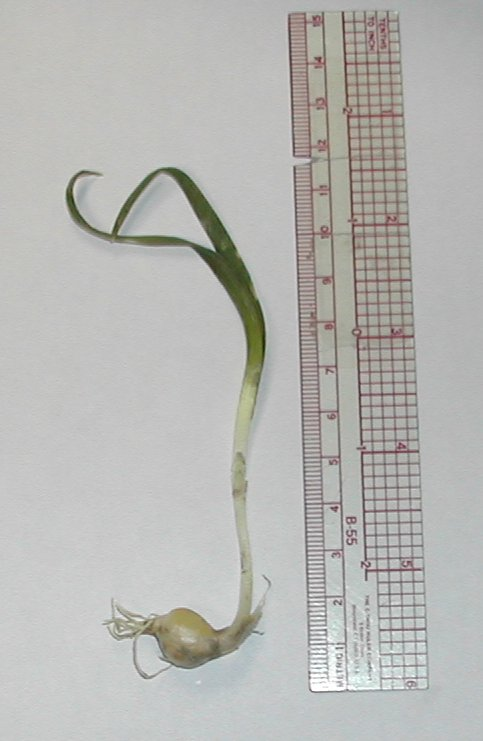

Conservation status
- Apparently Secure (NatureServe)

Scientific classification
- Kingdom: Plantae
- Clade: Embryophytes
- Clade: Tracheophytes
- Clade: Angiosperms
- Clade: Monocots
- Order: Asparagales
- Family: Amaryllidaceae
- Subfamily: Allioideae
- Genus: Allium
- Subgenus: A. subg. Amerallium
- Species: A. anceps

Binomial name
- Allium anceps Kellogg

= Allium anceps =

Twinleaf onion

North American onion species

Allium anceps, known as twinleaf onion and Kellogg's onion, is a species of wild onion native to the western United States. It is widespread in Nevada, extending into adjacent parts of California, Idaho, and Oregon. It grows in barren clay and rocky soils.

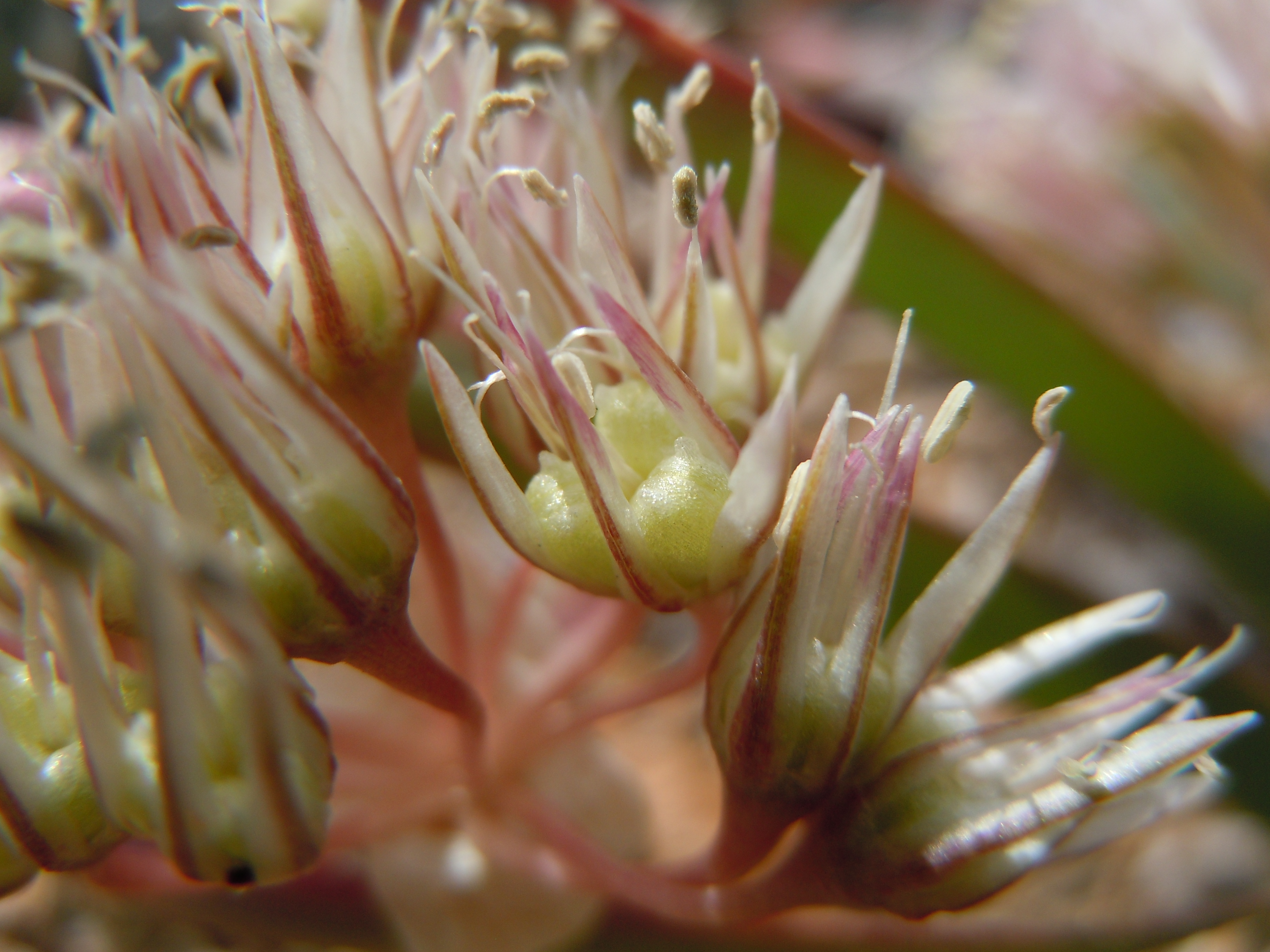
Flowering plants

This perennial herb produces a flowering scape from a bulb up to 2 cm (3/4 in) long and wide. There are up to 5 bulbs, sometimes wrapped together in the brown or yellow-brown outer coat. There are two flat, smooth-edged, sickle-shaped leaves up to 26 cm (10 in) long. The scape is erect, up to 15 cm (6 in) tall, and flattened with winged edges. It bears an umbel of 15 to 35 flowers with two spathes at the base. The star-shaped flower is roughly 1 cm (1/3 in) wide with six greenish-veined pink tepals. The six stamens are tipped with yellow anthers bearing yellow pollen. Once the seeds mature the scape dies and breaks off, usually along with the leaves.

The bulbs are edible and were a food source for the Northern Paiute, who roasted them and pressed them into cakes.

== Taxonomy ==
Allium anceps was scientifically described and named by Albert Kellogg in 1861. It is part of the Allium genus which is classified in the Amaryllidaceae. The species has no varieties or botanical synonyms.
