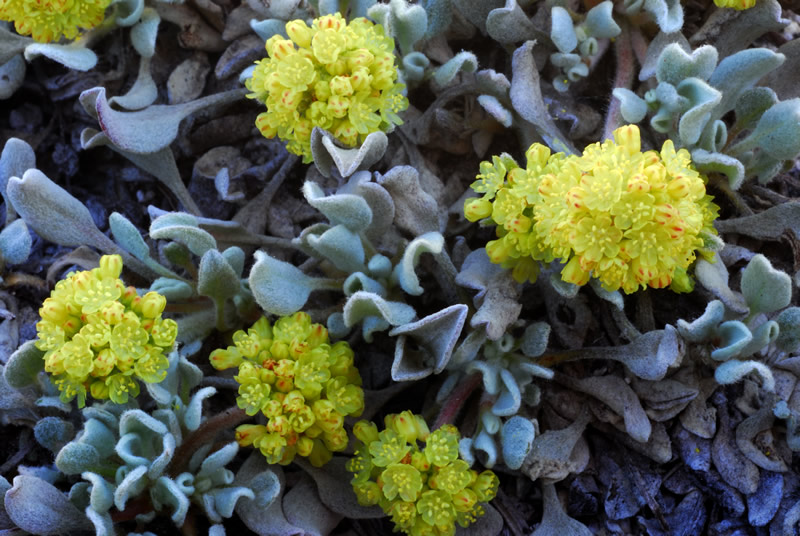

Scientific classification
- Kingdom: Plantae
- Clade: Tracheophytes
- Clade: Angiosperms
- Clade: Eudicots
- Order: Caryophyllales
- Family: Polygonaceae
- Genus: Eriogonum
- Species: E. diclinum

Binomial name
- Eriogonum diclinum Reveal

= Eriogonum diclinum =

Species of wild buckwheat

Eriogonum diclinum is a species of wild buckwheat known by the common name Jaynes Canyon buckwheat. It is native to the Klamath Mountains of northern California and southern Oregon, where it is an uncommon member of plant communities on serpentine soils. This is a small dioecious shrub forming low, thick mats rarely exceeding 20 centimeters in height. The curving, oval-shaped leaves are woolly and greenish gray in color, growing up to two centimeters long. The plant flowers in yellow to reddish rounded inflorescences, male plants producing clusters of staminate flowers, and female plants producing larger clusters of pistillate flowers.
