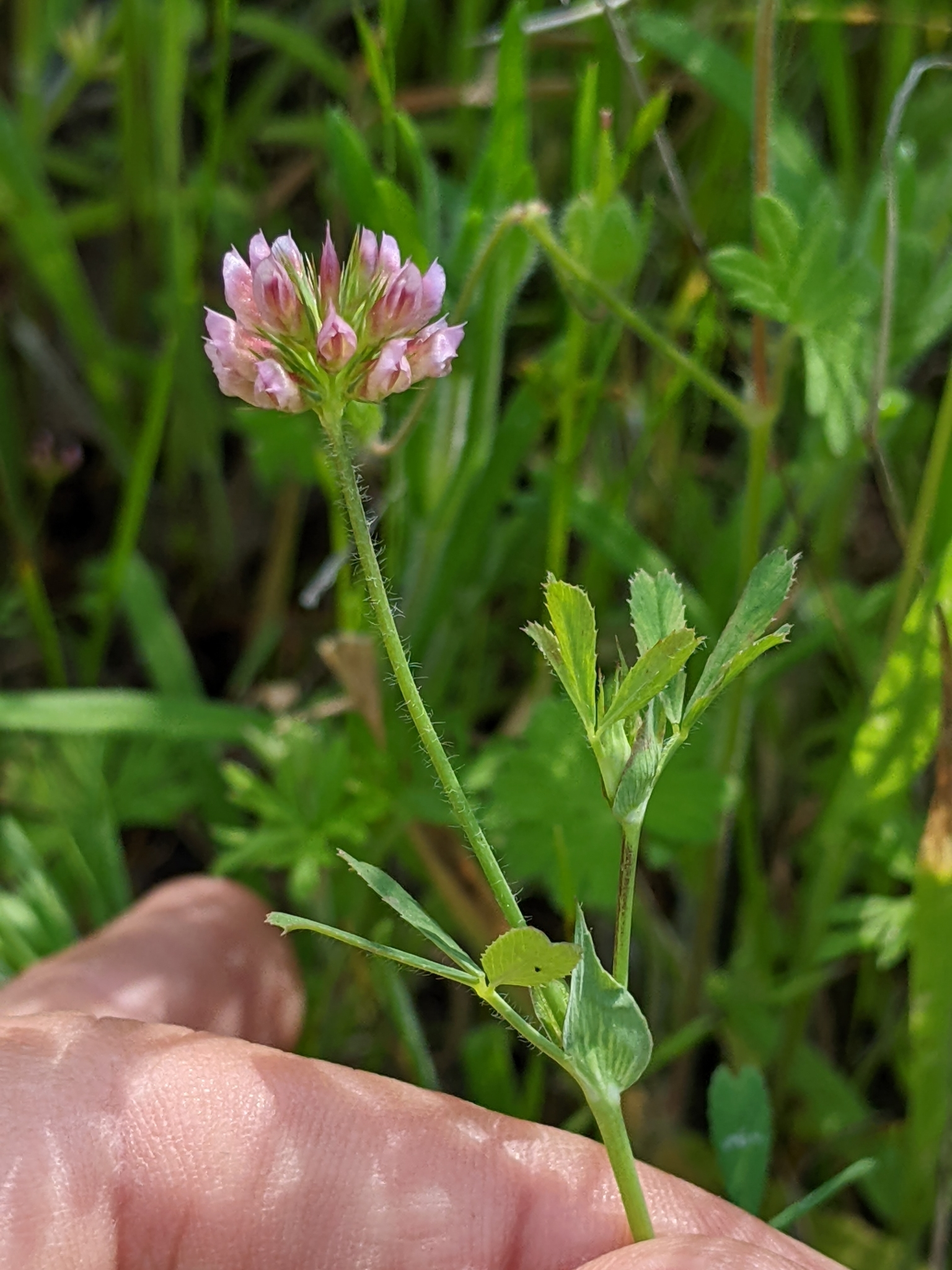

Scientific classification
- Kingdom: Plantae
- Clade: Embryophytes
- Clade: Tracheophytes
- Clade: Spermatophytes
- Clade: Angiosperms
- Clade: Eudicots
- Clade: Rosids
- Order: Fabales
- Family: Fabaceae
- Subfamily: Faboideae
- Genus: Trifolium
- Species: T. bifidum

Binomial name
- Trifolium bifidum A.Gray

= Trifolium bifidum =

Species of flowering plant

Trifolium bifidum is a species of clover known by the common names notchleaf clover and pinole clover.

== Description ==
It is an annual herb spreading or growing erect in form. It is lightly hairy to hairless in texture. The leaves are made up of oval leaflets 1 to 2 centimeters (1/2 to 3/4 in) long, usually with notches in the tips. The inflorescence is a head of flowers up to 1.5 cm wide. Each flower has a calyx of sepals that narrow to bristles covered in long hairs. The flower corolla is yellowish, pinkish, or purple and under 1 cm long. The flowers droop on the head as they age.

== Subspecies ==
Trifolium bifidum is often discussed as comprising two varieties. These are:

- T. bifidum var. bifidum
- T. bifidum var. decipiens

== Distribution and habitat ==
It is native to the western United States from Washington to California, where it grows in many types of habitat.
