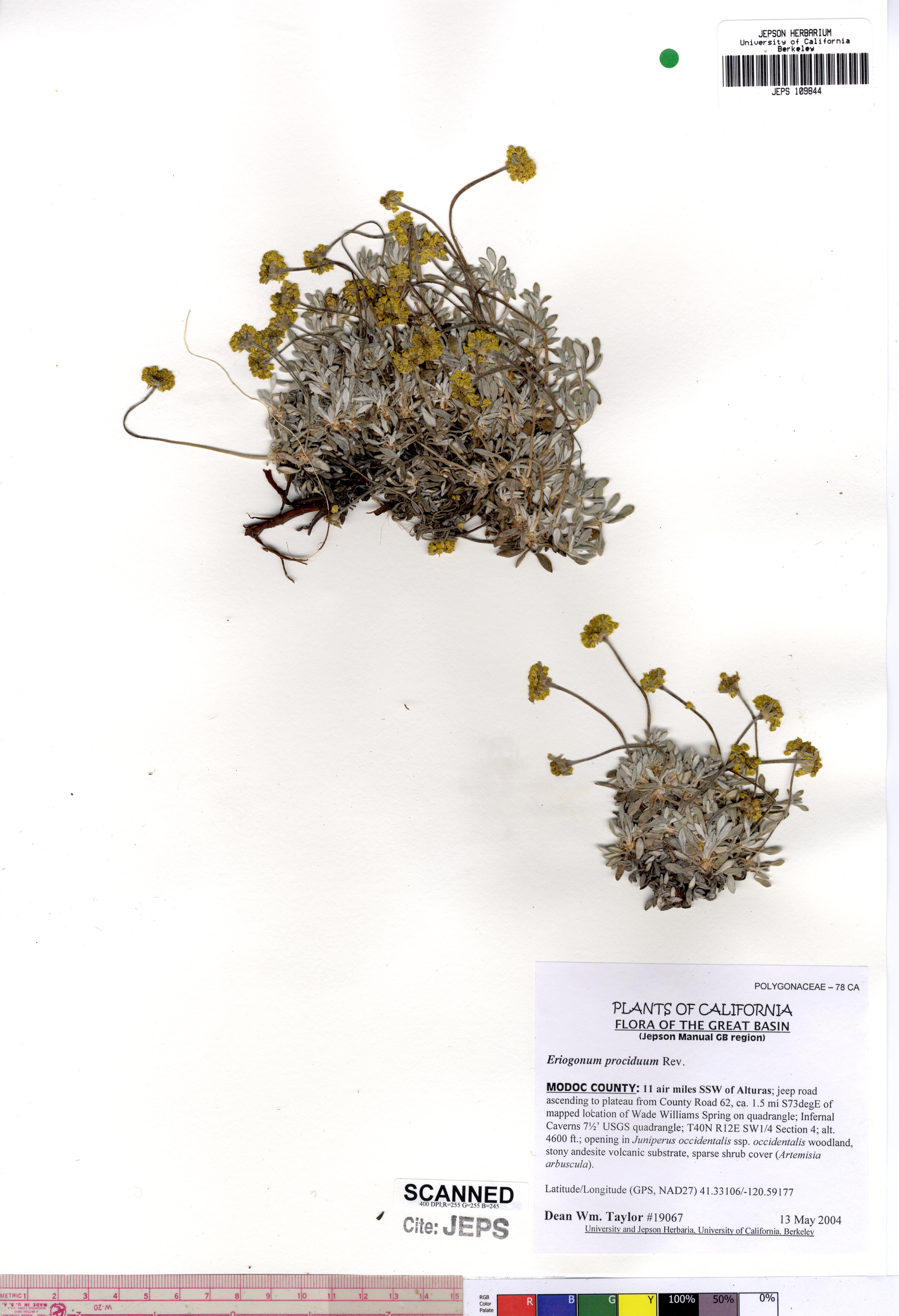

Scientific classification
- Kingdom: Plantae
- Clade: Tracheophytes
- Clade: Angiosperms
- Clade: Eudicots
- Order: Caryophyllales
- Family: Polygonaceae
- Genus: Eriogonum
- Species: E. prociduum

Binomial name
- Eriogonum prociduum Reveal

= Eriogonum prociduum =

Species of wild buckwheat

Eriogonum prociduum is a species of wild buckwheat known by the common name prostrate buckwheat. It is native to the western Great Basin of the United States in the region where Oregon meets California and Nevada, especially the Modoc Plateau, where it grows in exposed volcanic soils. It is a perennial herb growing a clump or mat of small woolly oval leaves around a branching woody caudex. The inflorescence arises on a scape and bears a rounded cluster of bright yellow flowers.
