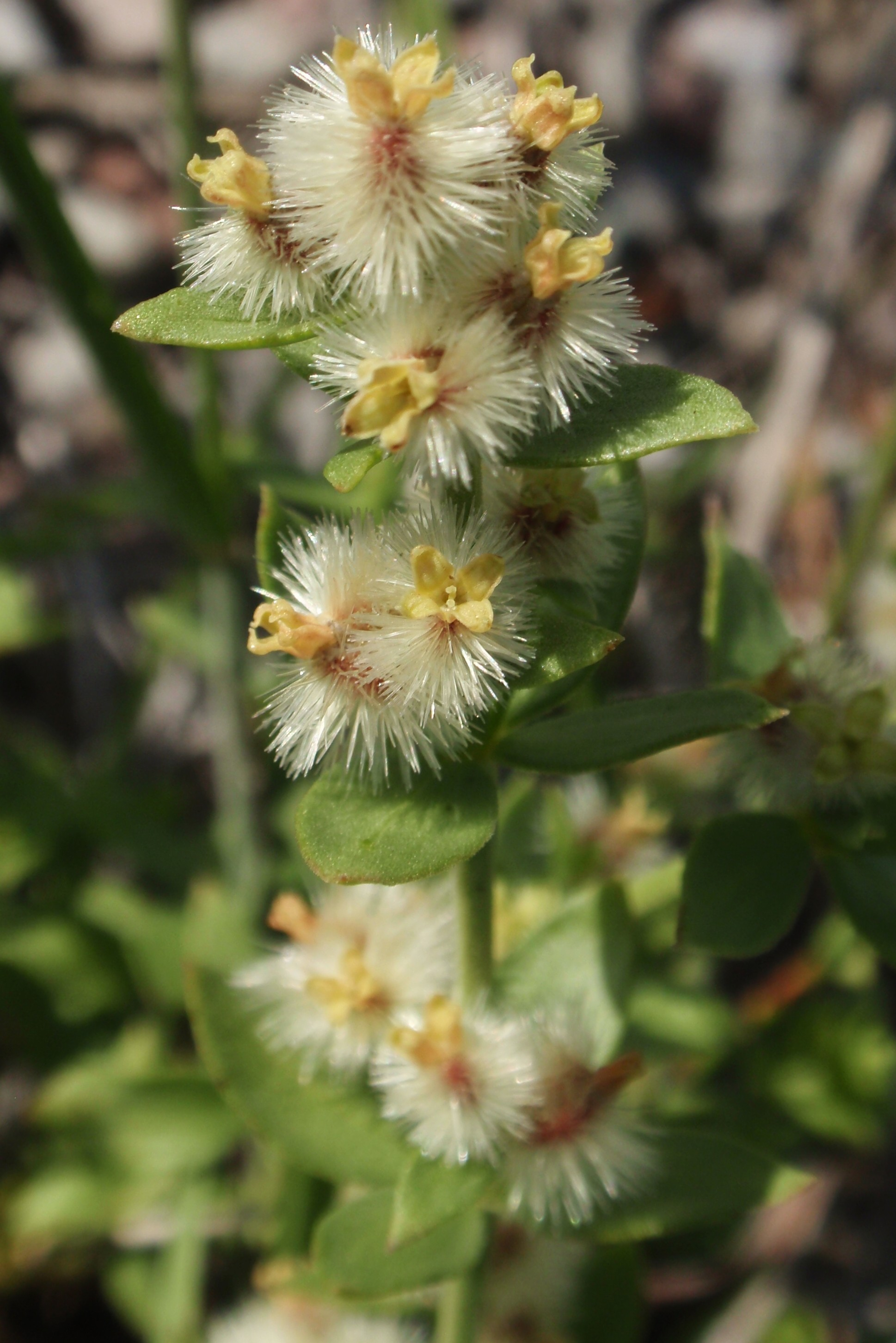

Scientific classification
- Kingdom: Plantae
- Clade: Tracheophytes
- Clade: Angiosperms
- Clade: Eudicots
- Clade: Asterids
- Order: Gentianales
- Family: Rubiaceae
- Genus: Galium
- Species: G. grayanum

Binomial name
- Galium grayanum Ehrend.

= Galium grayanum =

Gray's bedstraw

Species of plant

Galium grayanum is a species of flowering plant in the coffee family known by the common name Gray's bedstraw. It is native to the high mountains of northern California, western Nevada and southwestern Oregon.

Galium grayanum is a mat-forming perennial herb that grows in green carpet-like patches amongst the rock litter of mountain slopes. Its creeping stems may reach up to about 20 centimeters long. Leaves are arranged in whorls of four at intervals on the stem. They are oval-shaped, pointed, slightly fleshy, and velvety. The plant is dioecious, but male and female flowers are similar in appearance, with small yellowish to reddish corollas at the ends of the leafy stems. The fruit is a nutlet with a coat of very long hairs. When in fruit with a large number of nutlets the plant takes on a fuzzy appearance.

== Subspecies ==
Two subspecies are currently (May 2014) recognized:

- Galium grayanum var. grayanum - California + Oregon
- Galium grayanum var. nanum Dempster & Ehrend. - California (Tehama and Trinity Counties) to Nevada (Mt. Rose in Washoe County)
