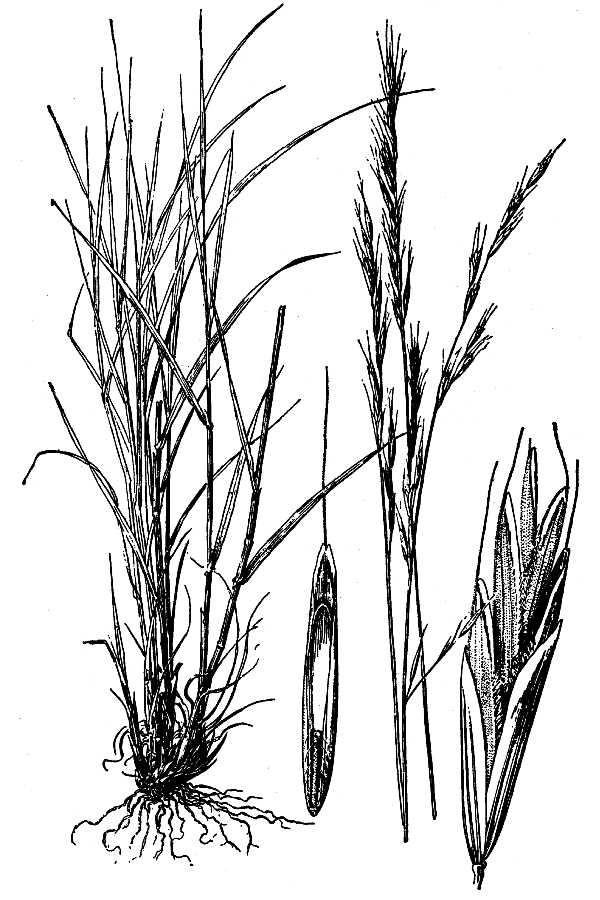

Scientific classification
- Kingdom: Plantae
- Clade: Tracheophytes
- Clade: Angiosperms
- Clade: Monocots
- Clade: Commelinids
- Order: Poales
- Family: Poaceae
- Subfamily: Pooideae
- Genus: Melica
- Species: M. aristata

Binomial name
- Melica aristata Thurb. ex Bol.

= Melica aristata =

Species of flowering plant

Melica aristata is a species of grass known by the common names awned melic and bearded melicgrass.

== Distribution ==
It is native to the western United States from the Pacific Northwest to the Sierra Nevada and nearby ranges, where it grows in mountain forests and open hillsides.

== Description ==
Melica aristata is a rhizomatous perennial grass growing up to 1.2 metres (3.9 ft) tall. The inflorescence is a narrow series of cylindrical spikelets. Each spikelet has an awn up to 1.2 centimeters long, the characteristic which distinguishes it from the other melics.
