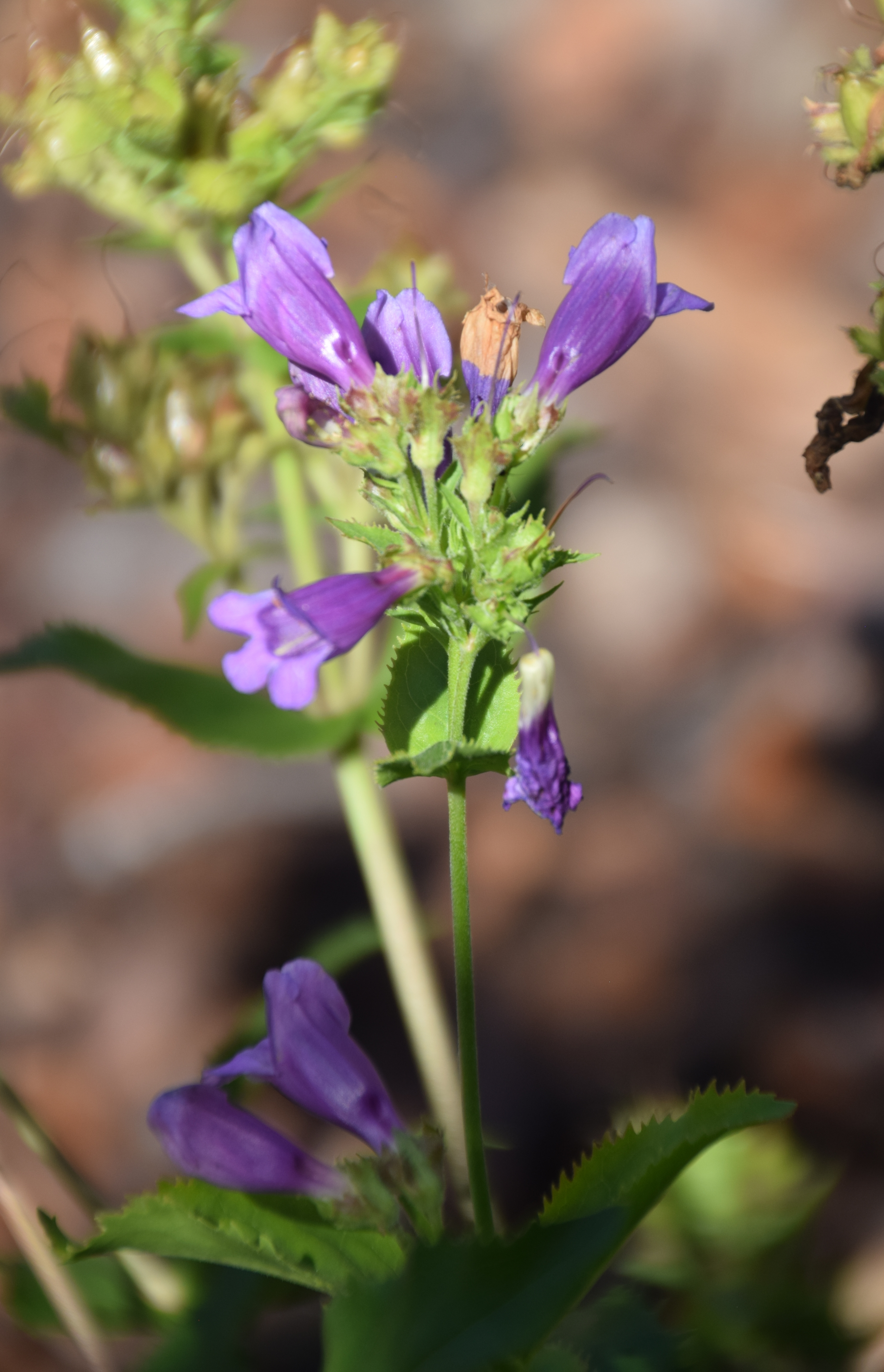

Conservation status
- Apparently Secure (NatureServe)

Scientific classification
- Kingdom: Plantae
- Clade: Tracheophytes
- Clade: Angiosperms
- Clade: Eudicots
- Clade: Asterids
- Order: Lamiales
- Family: Plantaginaceae
- Genus: Penstemon
- Species: P. azureus

Binomial name
- Penstemon azureus Benth.

Varieties
- P. azureus var. angustissimus A.Gray; P. azureus var. azureus

Synonyms
- Penstemon azureus subsp. typicus D.D.Keck; Penstemon heterophyllus var. azureus (Benth.) Jeps.

= Penstemon azureus =

Plant species in the plantain family

Penstemon azureus is a flowering plant species known by the common name azure penstemon. It is native to the mountains of Oregon and northern California. It grows in coniferous forests and woodlands in the Klamath Mountains, North California Coast Ranges, Southern Cascade Range, and Northern Sierra Nevada.

== Description ==
Penstemon azureus is a perennial plant that is a subshrub, a plant that is largely herbaceous, but is partly woody. It has many thin, hairless branches that are woody toward their base. They are most often 13 to 50 centimeters (5 to 20 in) in height, but occasionally may reach 70 cm (2.3 ft).

The leaves of Penstemon azureus are blue-green in color. Plants have both basal leaves and cauline ones, those attached to the base of the plant directly and those attached to stems, but sometimes they will have almost no basal leaves. When present the basal leaves and those on the lower parts of the stems will be 15 to 60 millimeters long and usually 2 to 10 mm wide, though occasionally as wide as 20 mm. They also vary in shape and may be obovate, teardrop shaped with the widest part towards the tip, oblanceolate, like a reversed spear head, or linear, narrow like a blade of grass.

Each stem will have between three and twenty pairs of leaves attached to opposite sides of the stem. Those higher up on the plant tend to be widest at the base and clasp the stem. Leaves higher up the stem have a larger size range of size, they can be 10 to 90 millimeters long and 2 to 20 mm wide. The shape of these leaves may be elliptic, ovate, lanceolate, or linear.

The inflorescence produces three to ten verticillasters, groups of flower with pairs of bracts under the attachment points. Each of these groups has two attachment points with one to four buds or hairless tubular flowers. The buds are yellow in color. The mature flowers are usually blue, but may occasionally be lavender or violet. Each flower is 18–35 mm long.

== Taxonomy ==
The scientific description and naming of Penstemon azureus was published by George Bentham in 1849. It has two accepted varieties.

=== Names ===
Penstemon azureus is known by the common names azure penstemon or azure beardtounge.

== Range and habitat ==
The species is native to the US with the majority of its range in California and a smaller area in southern Oregon. In California it grows as far south as Tulare County. There it is native to the Sierra Nevada foothills and the high mountains. It grows northward to Cascade Range and also grows from the north coast of California up into the North Coast Ranges. In Oregon it is found in four counties, Curry, Josephine, Jackson, and Douglas.

The variety angustissimus grows in moist woodlands or forests at elevations of 300 to 700 meters (980 to 2,300 ft) in elevation. The variety azureus grows at higher elevations, 500 m (1,640 ft) to as much as 2,500 m (8,200 ft), and is associated with oak, pine, or juniper woodlands.

== See also ==
List of Penstemon species
