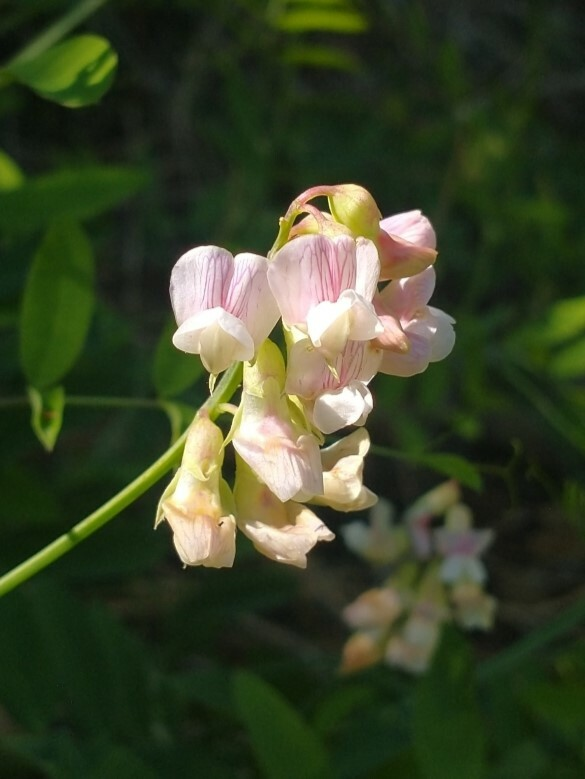

Conservation status
- Apparently Secure (NatureServe)

Scientific classification
- Kingdom: Plantae
- Clade: Tracheophytes
- Clade: Angiosperms
- Clade: Eudicots
- Clade: Rosids
- Order: Fabales
- Family: Fabaceae
- Subfamily: Faboideae
- Genus: Lathyrus
- Species: L. delnorticus

Binomial name
- Lathyrus delnorticus C.L.Hitchc.

= Lathyrus delnorticus =

Plant species in the pea family

Lathyrus delnorticus is an uncommon species of wild pea known as the Del Norte pea. It is native to the Klamath Mountains of southern Oregon and northern California, where it is a member of the serpentine soils flora. This is a hairless perennial herb producing a winged or flanged stem. The leaves are made up of several pairs of oval or lance-shaped leaflets, and the stipules of the leaves are wide and toothed. There are branching, coiled tendrils. The plant bears a dense inflorescence of up to 10 pea lavender-veined white flowers, each up to 1.5 centimeters wide. The fruit is a hairless dehiscent legume pod.

== Taxonomy ==
In 1952 the botanist Charles Leo Hitchcock described a new species in the Lathyrus genus, naming it Lathyrus delnorticus. Along with the rest of its genus the species is classified in the Fabaceae family and has no botanical synonyms.

== Range ==
The Del Norte pea is native to southwestern Oregon and northwestern California. It has been documented in Siskiyou and Del Norte counties in California and Josephine, Curry, and Coos counties in Oregon.
