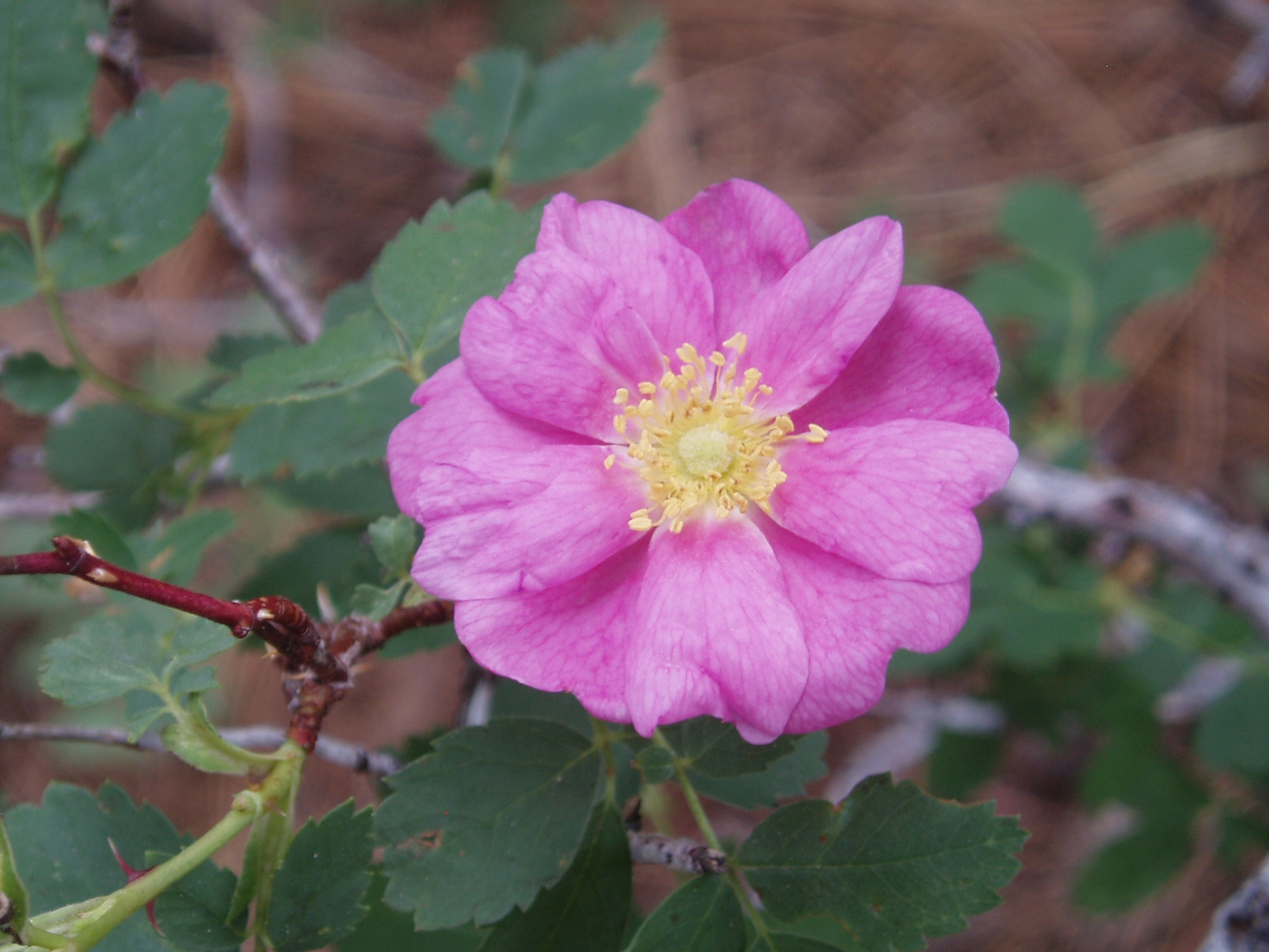

Scientific classification
- Kingdom: Plantae
- Clade: Tracheophytes
- Clade: Angiosperms
- Clade: Eudicots
- Clade: Rosids
- Order: Rosales
- Family: Rosaceae
- Genus: Rosa
- Species: R. spithamea

Binomial name
- Rosa spithamea S.Watson

= Rosa spithamea =

Species of flowering plant

Rosa spithamea is a species of rose known by the common names ground rose and coast ground rose. It is native to Oregon and California, where it grows in forest and chaparral habitats, especially areas recently burned.

== Description ==
Rosa spithamea is a small perennial shrub growing no taller than about half a meter. The stem is studded with a few or many prickles. The glandular leaves are each made up of several double-toothed oval leaflets, the terminal leaflet up to 3 centimeters long. The inflorescence is a cyme of up to 10 flowers with pink petals each up to 1.5 centimeters in length. The fruit is a rose hip about a centimeter wide and scarlet in color.
