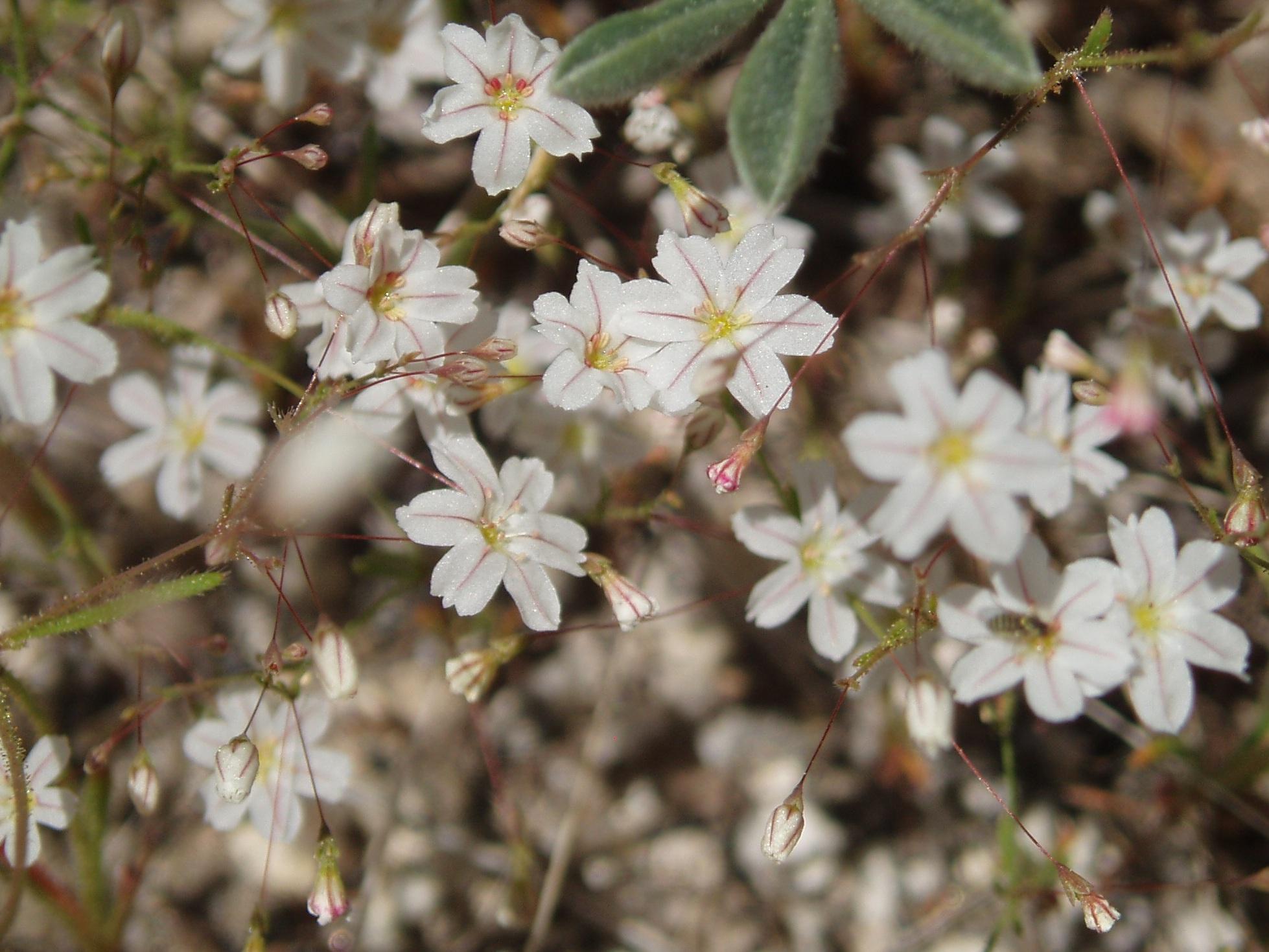

Scientific classification
- Kingdom: Plantae
- Clade: Tracheophytes
- Clade: Angiosperms
- Clade: Eudicots
- Order: Caryophyllales
- Family: Polygonaceae
- Genus: Eriogonum
- Species: E. spergulinum

Binomial name
- Eriogonum spergulinum A.Gray

= Eriogonum spergulinum =

Species of wild buckwheat

Eriogonum spergulinum is a species of wild buckwheat known by the common name spurry buckwheat.

== Varieties ==
There are three varieties: two are limited and endemic to the Sierra Nevada in California; while the more common of the three, var. reddingianum, the Redding buckwheat, can be found from California to Idaho.

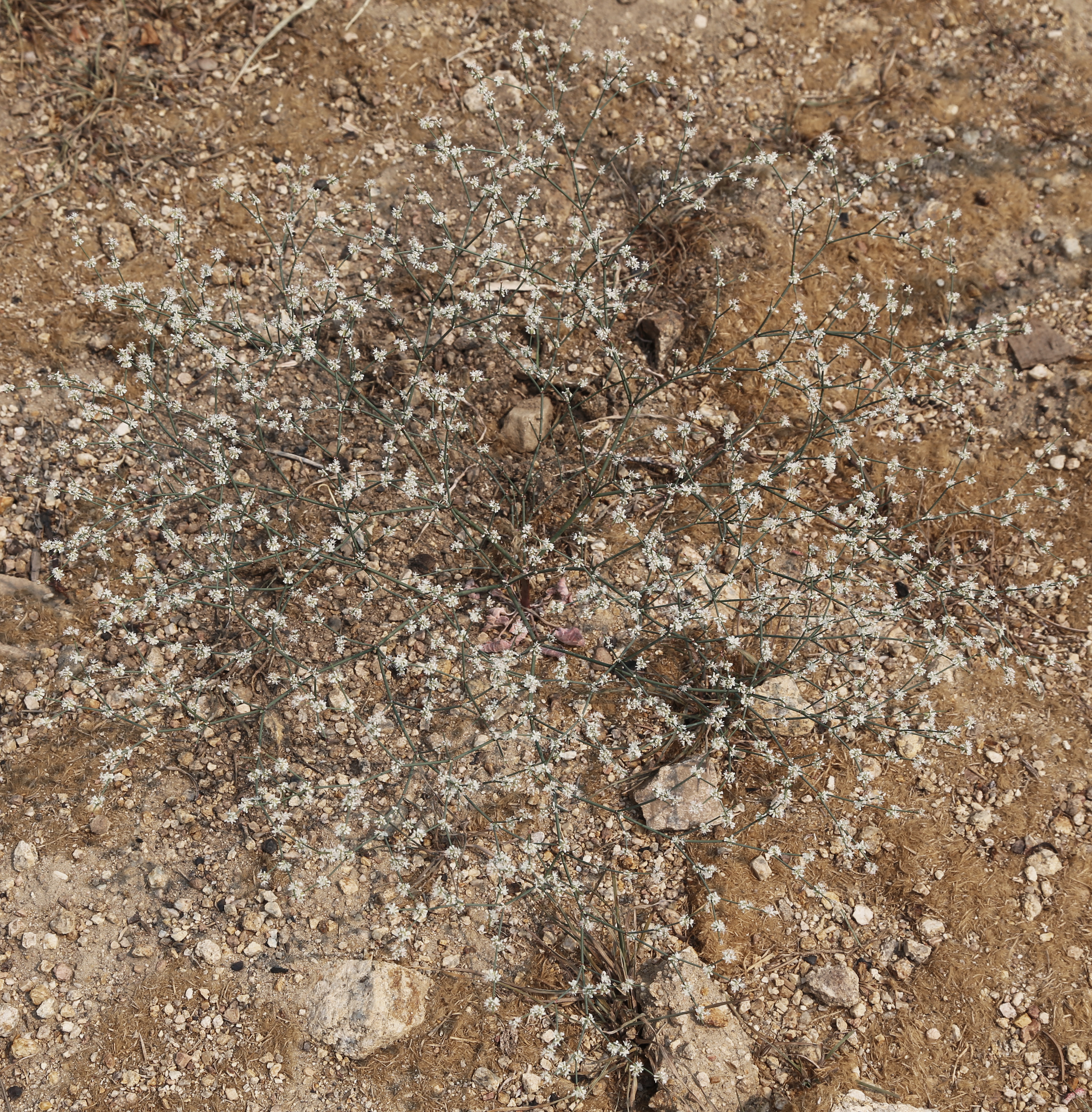
Eriogonum spergulinum plant, with thin stems and small "floating" flowers

== Description ==
This buckwheat is an annual herb varying in form from prostrate to erect, 40 centimeters long including inflorescence. The plant is mostly naked, with sparse linear leaves around the base of the stem and at points along the stem. The flowering stems are slender and branching, bearing clusters of small white flowers with dark midribs, giving a floating, "baby's-breath" appearance.
