= Galium glabrescens =

Castle Lake bedstraw

Scientific classification
- Kingdom: Plantae
- Clade: Tracheophytes
- Clade: Angiosperms
- Clade: Eudicots
- Clade: Asterids
- Order: Gentianales
- Family: Rubiaceae
- Genus: Galium
- Species: G. glabrescens

Binomial name
- Galium glabrescens (Ehrend.) Dempster & Ehrend.

Species of plant

Galium glabrescens is a species of flowering plant in the coffee family known by the common name Castle Lake bedstraw. It is native to the mountains of far northern California and southern Oregon, including the Klamath Mountains.

Galium glabrescens is a perennial herb producing an erect stem up to about 30 centimeters tall from a woody base. The stems have widely spaced whorls of four oval-shaped leaves. The plant is dioecious, with individuals bearing either male or female flowers. Both types of flowers are yellowish to reddish and borne on small stalks emerging from the leaf axils.

== Subspecies ==
Four subspecies are currently recognized (May 2014):

- Galium glabrescens subsp. glabrescens - California
- Galium glabrescens subsp. harticum Dempster & Ehrend. - Hart Mountain in Lake County
- Galium glabrescens subsp. josephinense Dempster & Ehrend. - Josephine County
- Galium glabrescens subsp. modocense Dempster & Ehrend. - Modoc County
