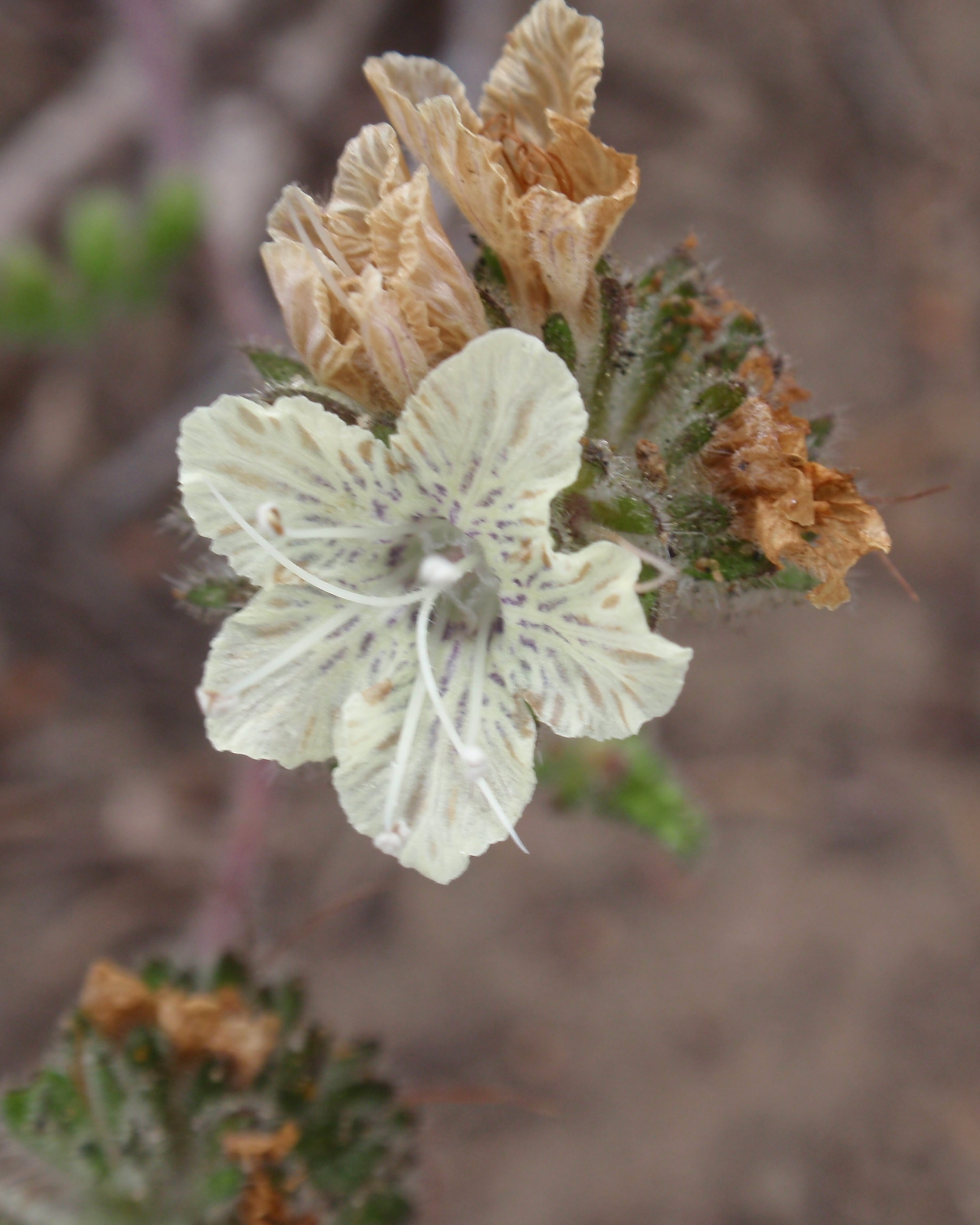

Scientific classification
- Kingdom: Plantae
- Clade: Embryophytes
- Clade: Tracheophytes
- Clade: Angiosperms
- Clade: Eudicots
- Clade: Asterids
- Order: Boraginales
- Family: Hydrophyllaceae
- Genus: Phacelia
- Species: P. malvifolia

Binomial name
- Phacelia malvifolia Cham.

= Phacelia malvifolia =

Species of plant

Phacelia malvifolia, with the common name stinging phacelia, is a species of phacelia. It is native to California, where it grows along the northern and central Coast and the California Coast Ranges. its distribution extends north along the coast just into southwestern Oregon. It grows in forest and scrub habitat.

== Description ==
Phacelia malvifolia is an annual herb growing mostly erect to a maximum height near one meter. It is coated in stiff, yellowish, glandular hairs with bulbous bases which produce a stinging reaction when touched. The rough-haired leaves are up to 14 centimeters long, the blades of the longer ones divided into usually three lobed leaflets.

The hairy to bristly inflorescence is a one-sided curving or coiling cyme of bell-shaped flowers. Each flower is about half a centimeter long and whitish in color.
