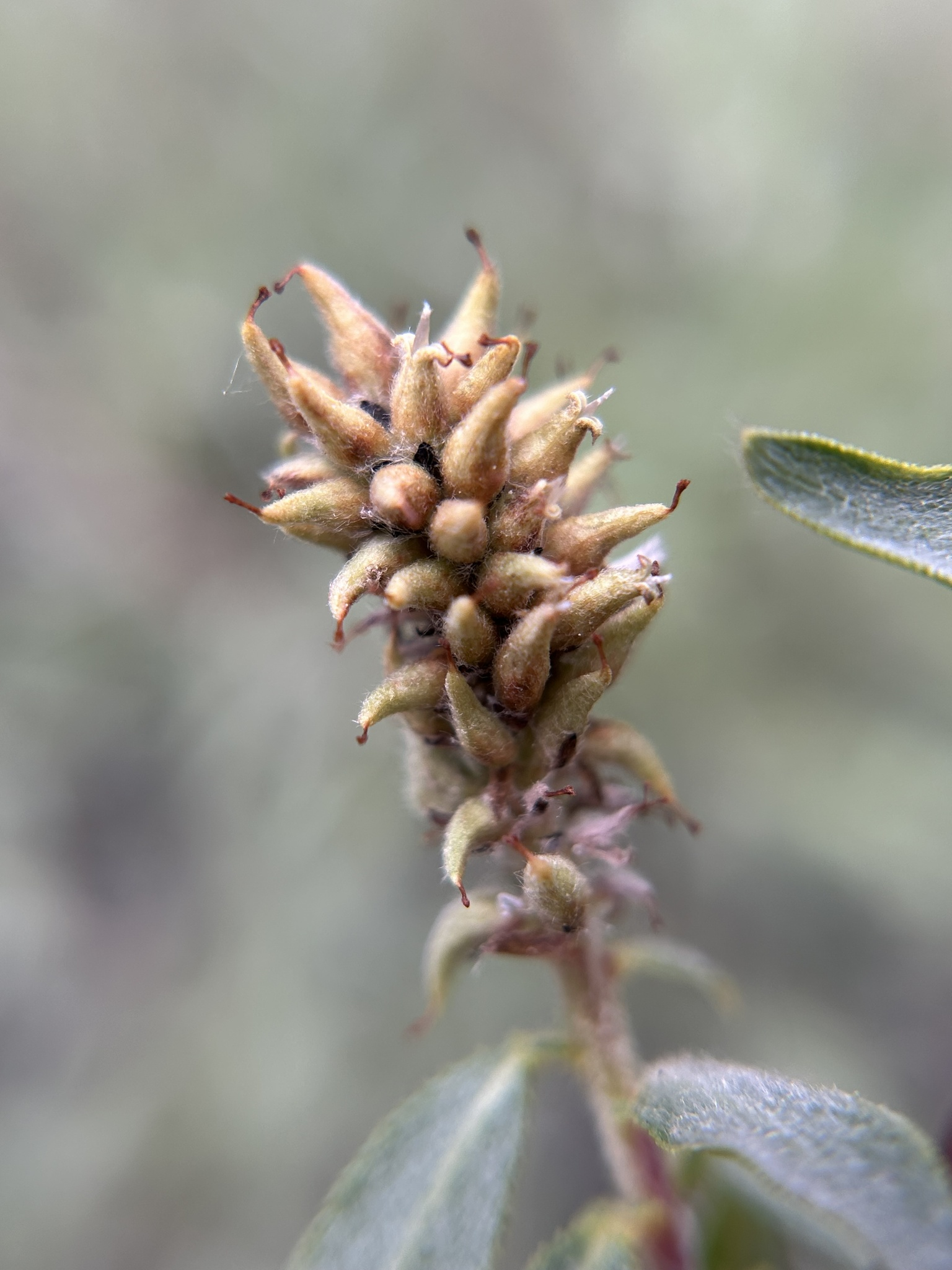
- In Yosemite National Park

Scientific classification
- Kingdom: Plantae
- Clade: Embryophytes
- Clade: Tracheophytes
- Clade: Spermatophytes
- Clade: Angiosperms
- Clade: Eudicots
- Clade: Rosids
- Order: Malpighiales
- Family: Salicaceae
- Genus: Salix
- Species: S. orestera

Binomial name
- Salix orestera C.K.Schneid.

= Salix orestera =

Species of willow

Salix orestera is a species of willow known by the common name Sierra willow, or gray-leafed Sierra willow. It is native to the Sierra Nevada of California and western Nevada, where it grows in moist areas in high mountain subalpine and alpine climates. It can also be found in Oregon.

== Description ==
Salix orestera is very similar to Salix glauca and is sometimes included within that species. It is a shrub reaching one half to two meters tall, bushy with slender branches. The lance-shaped leaves are up to 9.5 centimeters long and often have coatings of silky hairs. The inflorescence is a stout catkin of flowers.
