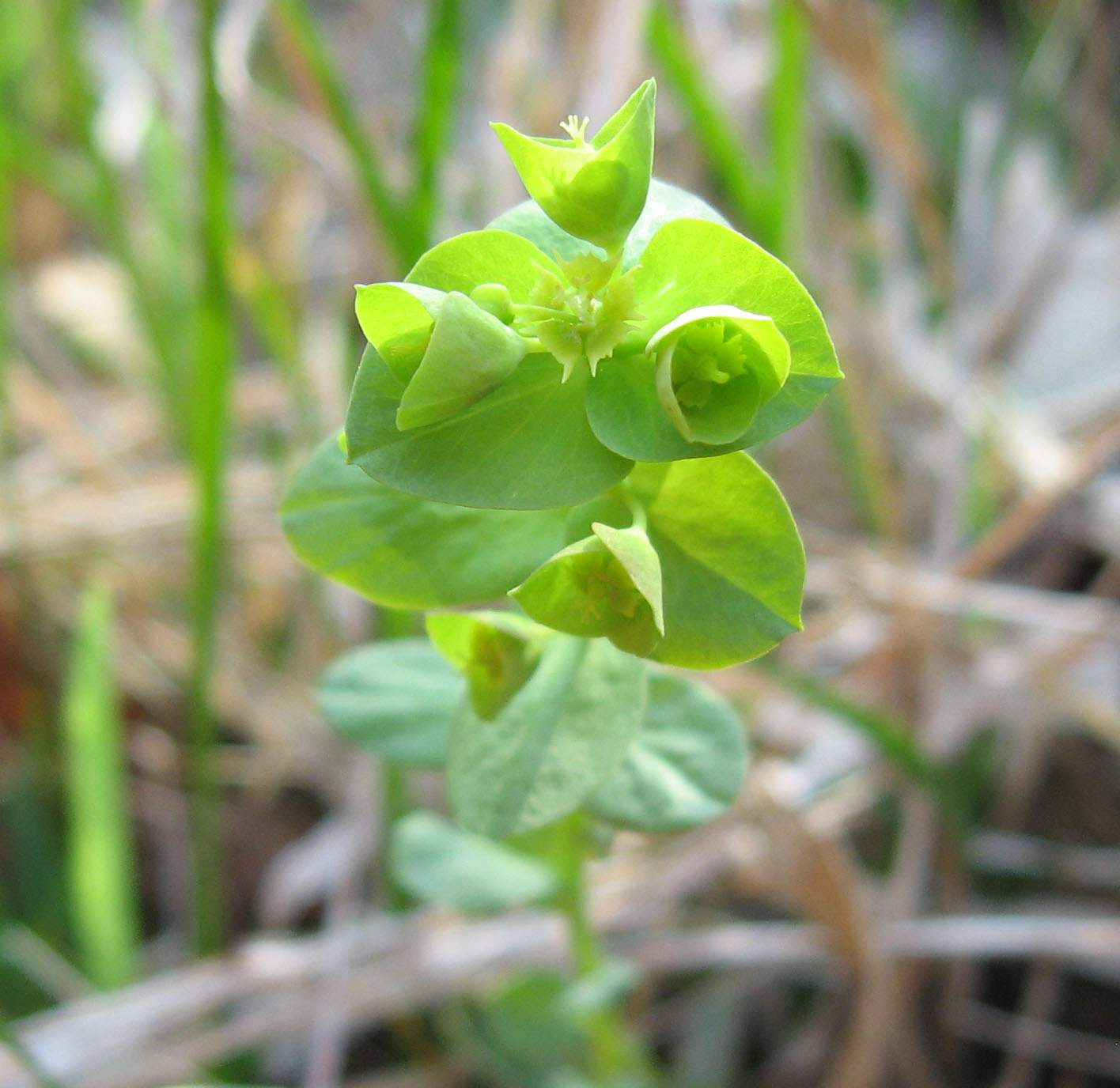

Scientific classification
- Kingdom: Plantae
- Clade: Tracheophytes
- Clade: Angiosperms
- Clade: Eudicots
- Clade: Rosids
- Order: Malpighiales
- Family: Euphorbiaceae
- Genus: Euphorbia
- Species: E. commutata

Binomial name
- Euphorbia commutata Engelmann ex A.Gray

= Euphorbia commutata =

Species of flowering plant

Euphorbia commutata, the tinted woodland spurge, is an annual plant in the family Euphorbiaceae. It is native to Eastern North America where it is found in rich, calcareous forests and rock outcrops. It has small green flowers in the spring, so it is easily overlooked. Leaves are obovate and alternate in arrangement with milky sap.

Two varieties of Euphorbia commutata are sometimes recognized. These are:

- Euphorbia commutata var. commutata
- Euphorbia commutata var. erecta
