= Silene nuda =

Scientific classification
- Kingdom: Plantae
- Clade: Tracheophytes
- Clade: Angiosperms
- Clade: Eudicots
- Order: Caryophyllales
- Family: Caryophyllaceae
- Genus: Silene
- Species: S. nuda

Binomial name
- Silene nuda (S.Watson) C.L.Hitchc. & Maguire

Species of flowering plant

Silene nuda is a species of flowering plant in the family Caryophyllaceae known by the common names western fringed catchfly and sticky catchfly.

It is native to the Sierra Nevada and Modoc Plateau of California, its distribution extending into Oregon and Nevada. It grows in forest, woodland, and scrub habitat, sometimes in saline soils.

Silene nuda is a perennial herb growing from a thick, woody caudex and taproot, sending up one or more upright stems up to 0.5 metres (1.6 ft) tall.

The largest leaves are located in tufts around the caudex, each measuring up to 15 centimeters long by 3 wide. Smaller leaves occur higher up the stem.

Each flower is encapsulated in a hairy, veined calyx of fused sepals. The five long petals are pink and each has two lobes at the tip.
