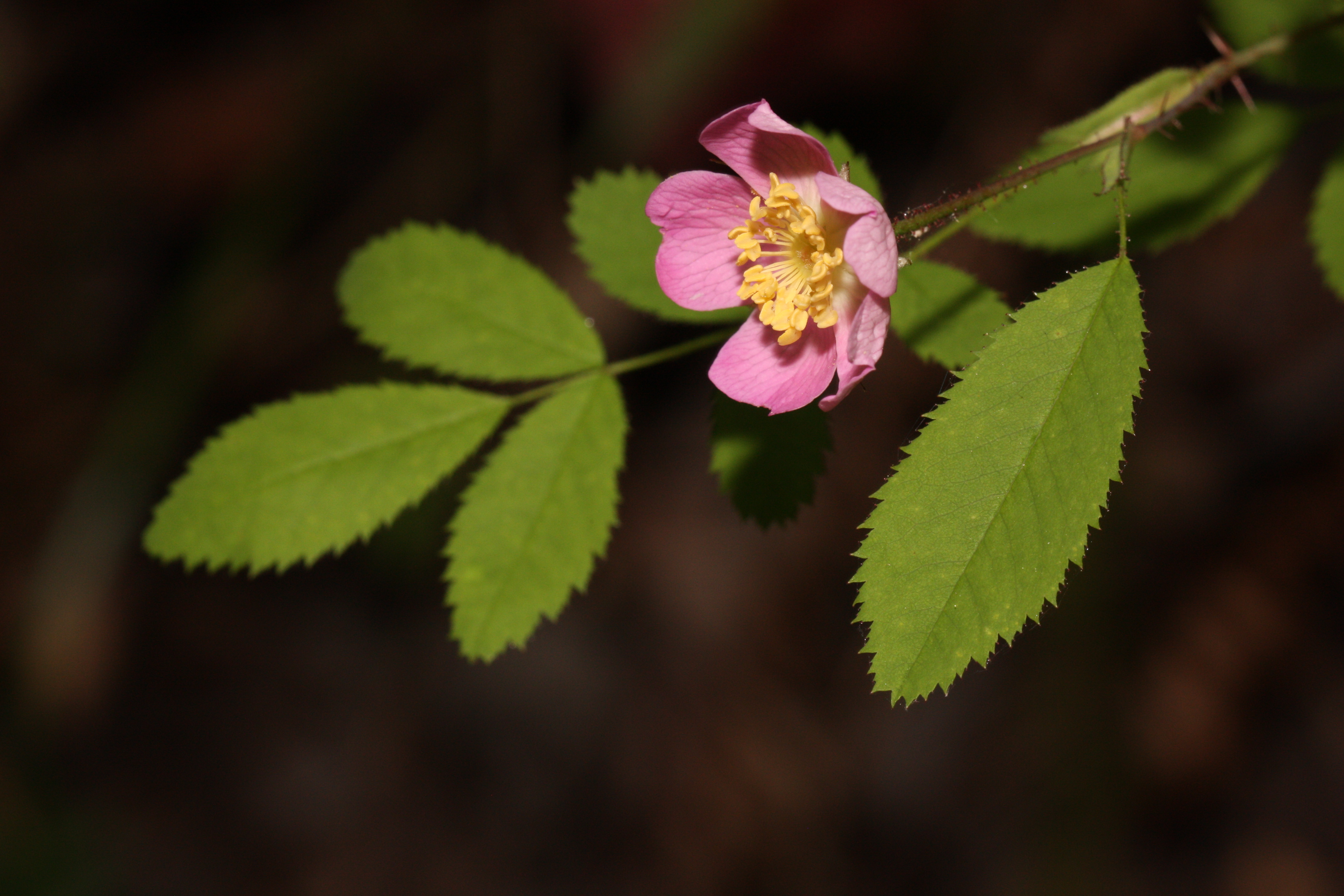

Scientific classification
- Kingdom: Plantae
- Clade: Tracheophytes
- Clade: Angiosperms
- Clade: Eudicots
- Clade: Rosids
- Order: Rosales
- Family: Rosaceae
- Genus: Rosa
- Species: R. gymnocarpa

Binomial name
- Rosa gymnocarpa Nutt.

= Rosa gymnocarpa =

Species of flowering plant

Rosa gymnocarpa is a species of rose native to western North America. It is known by the common names dwarf rose, baldhip rose, and wood rose. It grows in shady, damp, and rich forests.

== Description ==
Rosa gymnocarpa is a perennial, deciduous shrub growing up to 2 metres (6.6 ft) in height. Its slender stem is covered with long, straight prickles which are present in varying numbers, and it possesses rhizomes and shallow roots. It is adapted to low- to medium-intensity fires, after which it resprouts from root crowns and rhizomes.

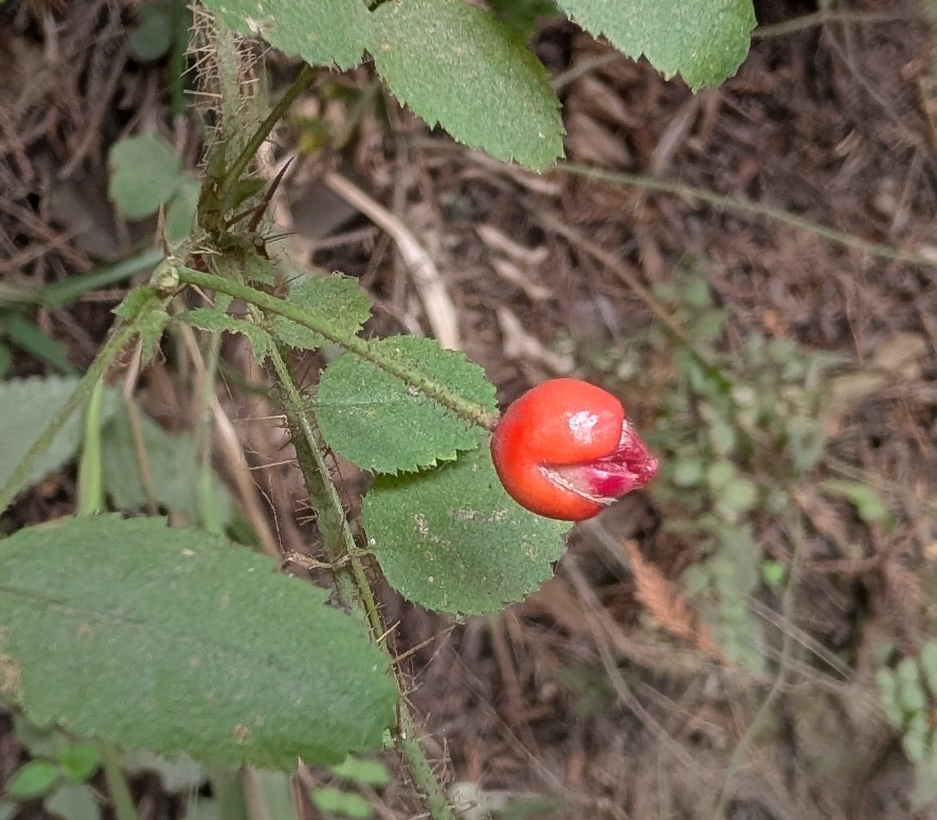
The small rose hip of Rosa gymnocarpa

Rosa gymnocarpa begins flowering at 3 to 5 years. The pink or white fragrant flowers develop in late spring or early summer. They are flat and open-faced with five petals in most any shade of pink to almost lavender. Its fruit is a red rose hip containing hard tan achenes that contain the seeds. The fruit is eaten by birds and mammals, which disperse the seeds. The sepals fall away from the hip earlier than in other species of rose, hence the name baldhip rose. The hips remain on the plant through winter. The leaves are pinnately compound, alternate, with 5 to 9 leaflets, each of which are 1 to 2.5 cm long and 0.6 to 1.2 cm wide. Leaflets are elliptic to ovate to round.

== See also ==
- List of Rosa species
