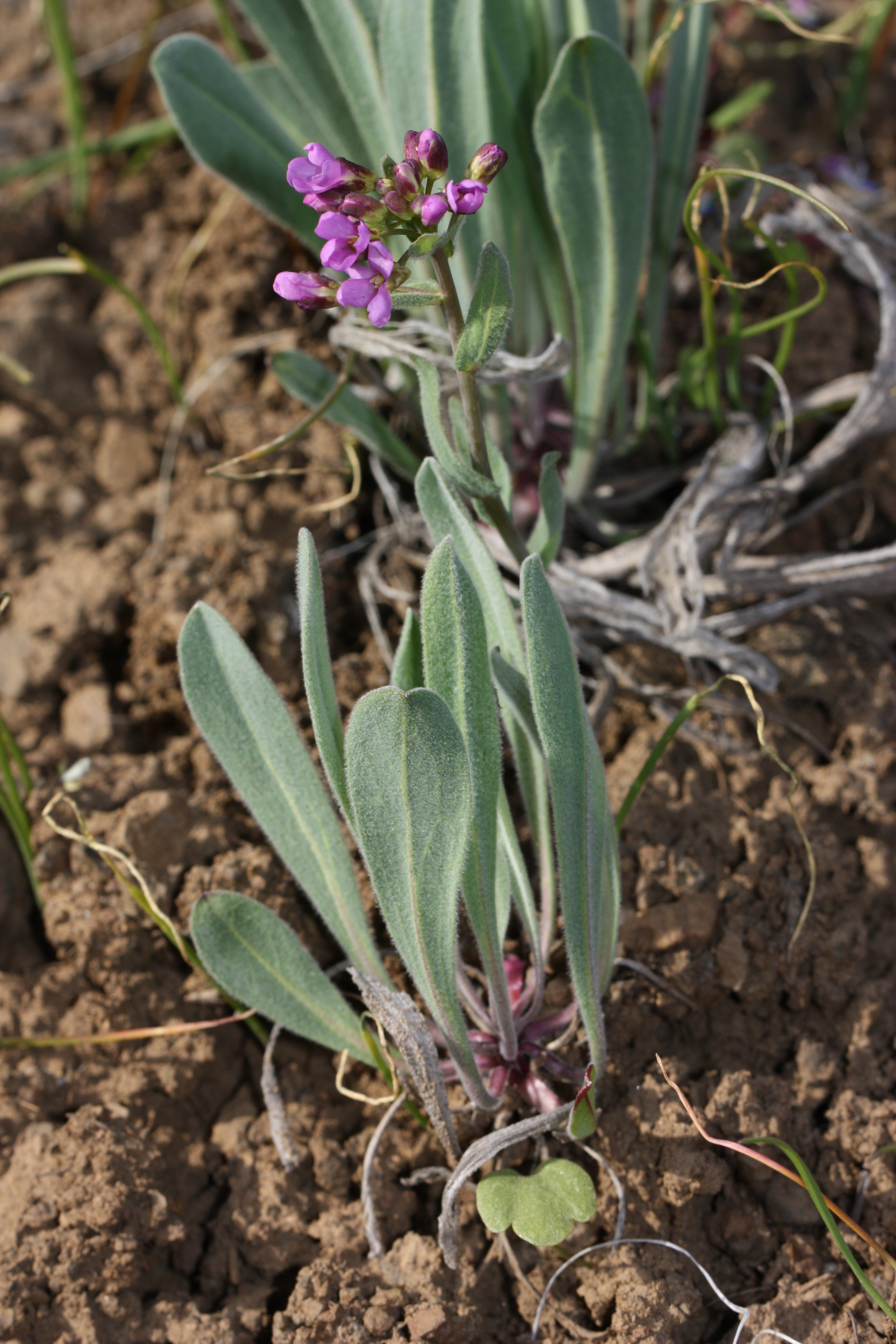

Conservation status
- Apparently Secure (NatureServe)

Scientific classification
- Kingdom: Plantae
- Clade: Tracheophytes
- Clade: Angiosperms
- Clade: Eudicots
- Clade: Rosids
- Order: Brassicales
- Family: Brassicaceae
- Genus: Phoenicaulis; Nutt.
- Species: P. cheiranthoides

Binomial name
- Phoenicaulis cheiranthoides Nutt.

Synonyms
- Synonymy: Arabis menziesii var. lanuginosa (S.Watson) A.Nelson & J.F.Macbr.; Arabis menziesii var. lata A.Nelson & J.F.Macbr.; Arabis pedicellata A.Nelson; Parrya cheiranthoides (Nutt.) Jeps.; Parrya cheiranthoides var. glabra (Jeps.) Jeps.; Parrya cheiranthoides var. lanuginosa (S.Watson) M.Peck; Parrya menziesii var. glabra Jeps.; Parrya menziesii var. lanuginosa S.Watson; Parrya pedicellata (A.Nelson) Tidestr.; Phoenicaulis cheiranthoides subsp. glabra (Jeps.) Abrams; Phoenicaulis cheiranthoides subsp. lanuginosa (S.Watson) Abrams; Phoenicaulis cheiranthoides var. lanuginosa (S.Watson) Rollins; Phoenicaulis menziesii var. lanuginosa (S.Watson) A.Heller; Phoenicaulis pedicellata (A.Nelson) A.Heller; Streptanthus pedicellatus (A.Nelson) A.Nelson

= Phoenicaulis =

Genus of flowering plants

Phoenicaulis is a monotypic genus of flowering plants in the family Brassicaceae found in western North America. It contains the single species Phoenicaulis cheiranthoides, which is known by the common names daggerpod and wallflower phoenicaulis. The genus name means 'reddish-purple stems', probably in reference to the tendency for the stems to take on such a color, and the species name means 'hand of flowers'.

== Description ==
The species is a perennial herb producing one or more stems up to 25 to 30 centimetres (9 7/8 to 11 3/4 in) tall from a caudex. The basal leaves are narrowly lance-shaped to teardrop-shaped, up to 10 cm long, and woolly in texture. Leaves higher on the stem are shorter and usually less hairy. The inflorescence is a raceme of flowers with purple or pink petals up to about 1.5 cm long. The fruits are narrow, hairless siliques up to 9 cm long, and stick out from the stem on pedicels. The fruits are shaped like a dagger, giving the common name daggerpod.

== Range and habitat ==
The plant grows in many types of habitat, especially rocky areas. It occurs in sagebrush scrub, scree, exposed volcanic and clay slopes, rock outcrops, hills, banks, and meadows. In the southern part of its range it also grows in the alpine climate of high mountains. It grows at up to 3200 meters in elevation and flowers early in spring.

== Gallery ==
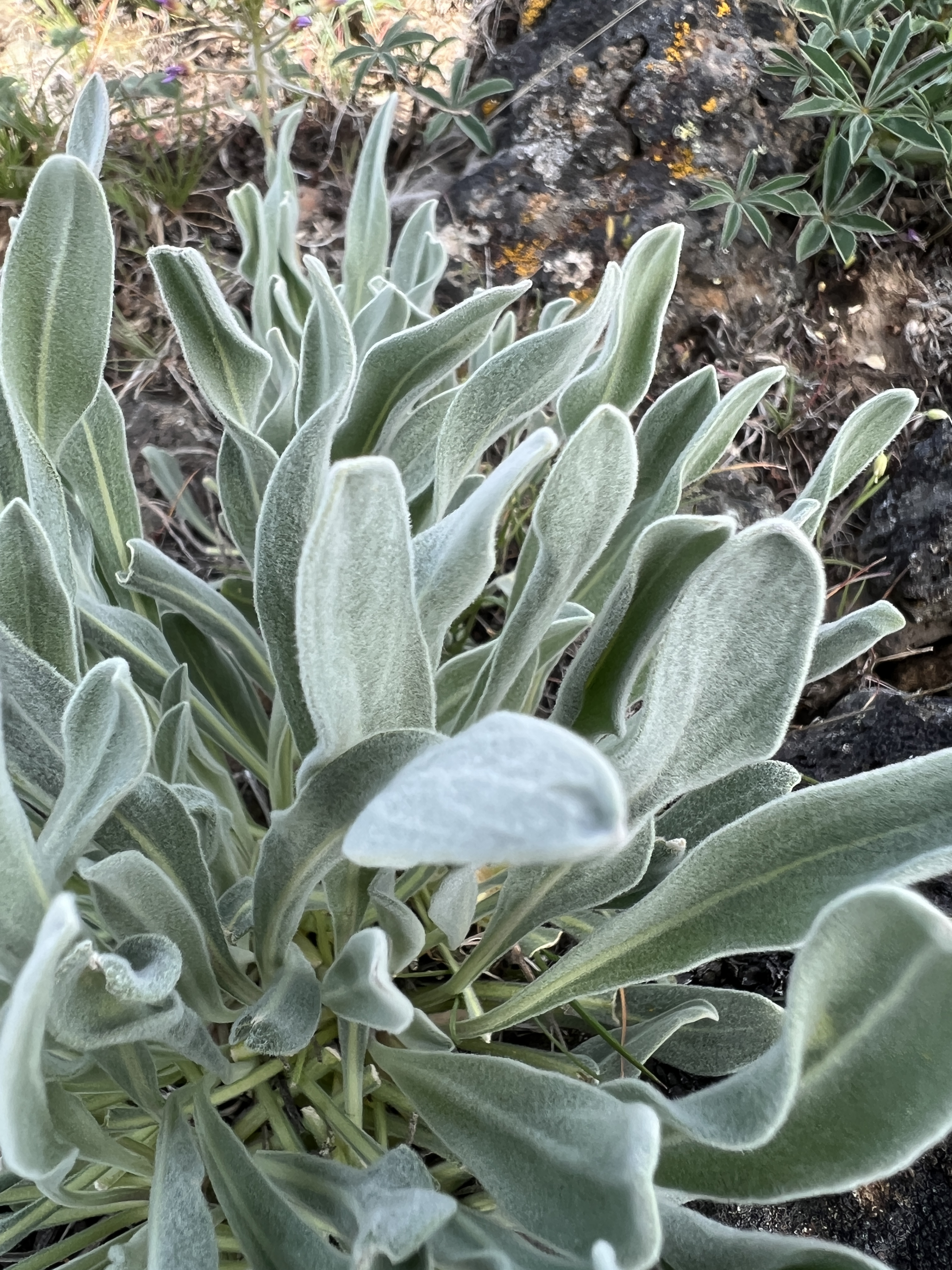
Leaves

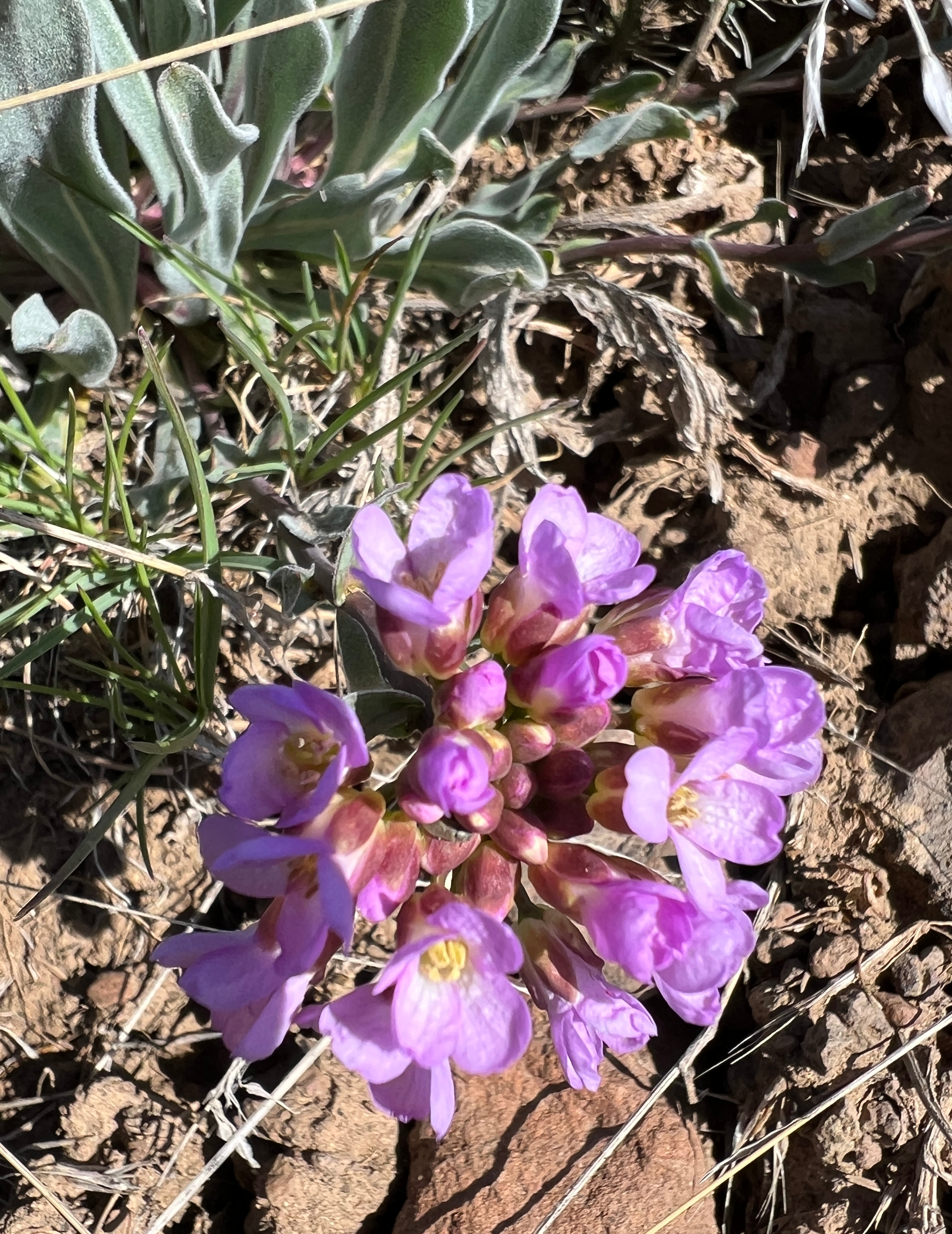
Flowers

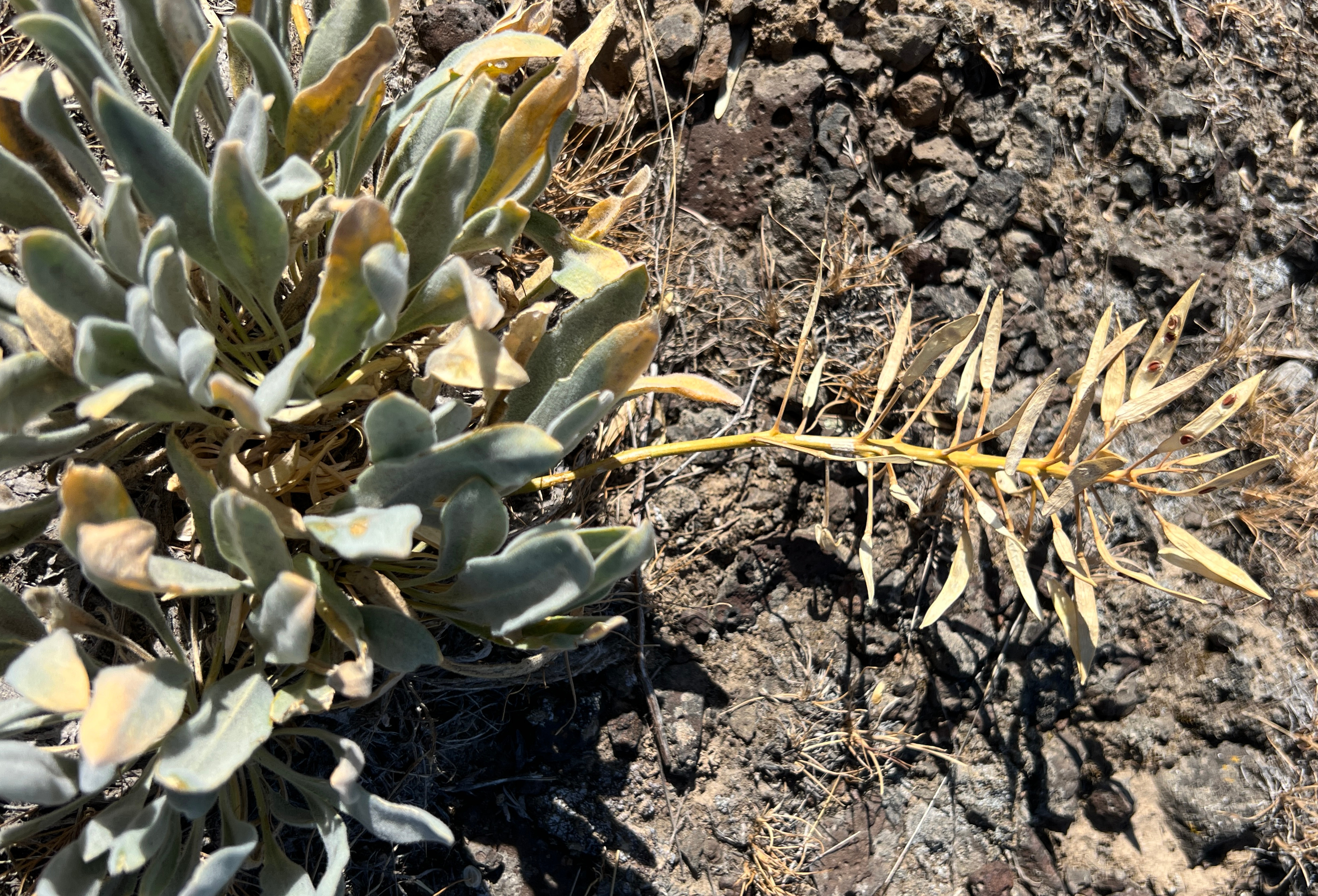
Seed capsule
