= P. californica =

P. californica may refer to:

- Paeonia californica, the California peony or wild peony, a plant species endemic to southwest California
- Parnassia californica, the California grass of Parnassus, a flowering plant species native to the mountains of Oregon, California and Nevada
- Perideridia californica, the California yampah, a flowering plant species endemic to California
- Phacelia californica, the California phacelia and California scorpionweed, a plant species native to coastal northern California and Oregon
- Phalaris californica, the California canarygrass, an uncommon grass species native to southern Oregon and northern and central California
- Phragmatopoma californica, the sandcastle worm, honeycomb worm or honeycomb tube worm, a reef-forming marine polychaete worm species found on the Californian coast, from Sonoma County to northern Baja California
- Phryganidia californica, the California oakworm or California oak moth, a moth species found along the coasts of California and Oregon
- Plagiodera californica, a leaf beetle
- Polioptila californica, the California gnatcatcher, a small insectivorous bird species
- Polygala californica, the California milkwort, a flowering plant species native to southwestern Oregon and northern and central California
- Pteronarcys californica, the giant stonefly or salmonfly, an aquatic insect species

== Synonyms ==
- Phomopsis californica, a synonym for Diaporthe citri, a plant pathogen species
- Pyrocleptria californica, a synonym for Schinia aurantiaca, a moth species found in North America, including California and Arizona

== See also ==
- List of Latin and Greek words commonly used in systematic names#C
