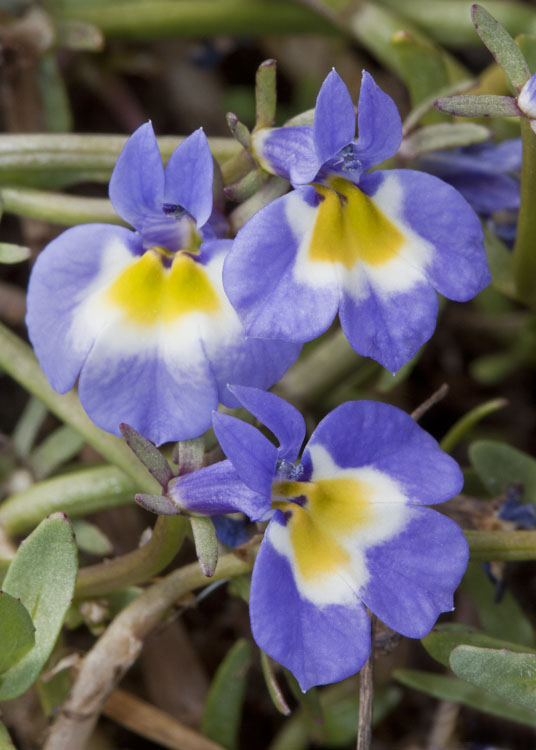

Conservation status
- Imperiled (NatureServe)

Scientific classification
- Kingdom: Plantae
- Clade: Tracheophytes
- Clade: Angiosperms
- Clade: Eudicots
- Clade: Asterids
- Order: Asterales
- Family: Campanulaceae
- Genus: Downingia
- Species: D. bella

Binomial name
- Downingia bella Hoover

= Downingia bella =

Species of flowering plant

Downingia bella, also known as Hoover's calicoflower or Hoover's Downingia, is a member of the Bellflower Family (Campanulaceae). The genus is named after A.J. Downing (1815–1852) a noted American horticulturist and landscape architect.

This native annual herb is endemic to California and found in valley grassland communities. Its habitat is wetlands, generally vernal pools between 4600 and 5250 feet (1400 to 1600m). As approximately 20% of vernal pools in California have been lost, D. bella is uncommon. The range of D. bella is scattered from locations in Riverside County to areas in the Great Central Valley.

== Description ==
Like all Downingia, the stem is decumbent to erect with leaves that are along the stem and often fall before the plant flowers.

The flowers are not sessile and in a spike inflorescence with individual flowers having a corolla length of 10 to 12 mm. The corolla is glabrous and has 2 distinct lips, the upper with 2 lobes and lower with 3 lobes. The upper lobes are narrowly triangular or elliptic in shape while the lower lobes are obtuse and abruptly toothed. The corolla is blue with the lower lip having a central white field which then has two yellow spots (can be joined) in its middle. At the throat D. bella has 2 raised nipples that generally have 3 alternating purple spots.

The 5 fused stamens have anthers that are included in the corolla tube and are angled less than 45 degrees to filaments. The inferior ovary is pedicel-like and is 2 chambered.

The fruits of D. bella are between 16 and 18 mm with tough lateral walls that are tardily dehiscent despite no noticeable translucent lines. The seeds within the fruit are longitudinally striate.

Some areas in northern Sutter County have D. bella with a minute corolla horn similar to D. ornatissima.
