= D. laeta =

D. laeta may refer to:

- Davidia laeta, a deciduous tree
- Downingia laeta, a bellflower native to western North America
