= Yina =

Yina may refer to:

- Downingia yina, a wildflower commonly known as the cascade calicoflower
- Yina Moe-Lange, Danish alpine skier
