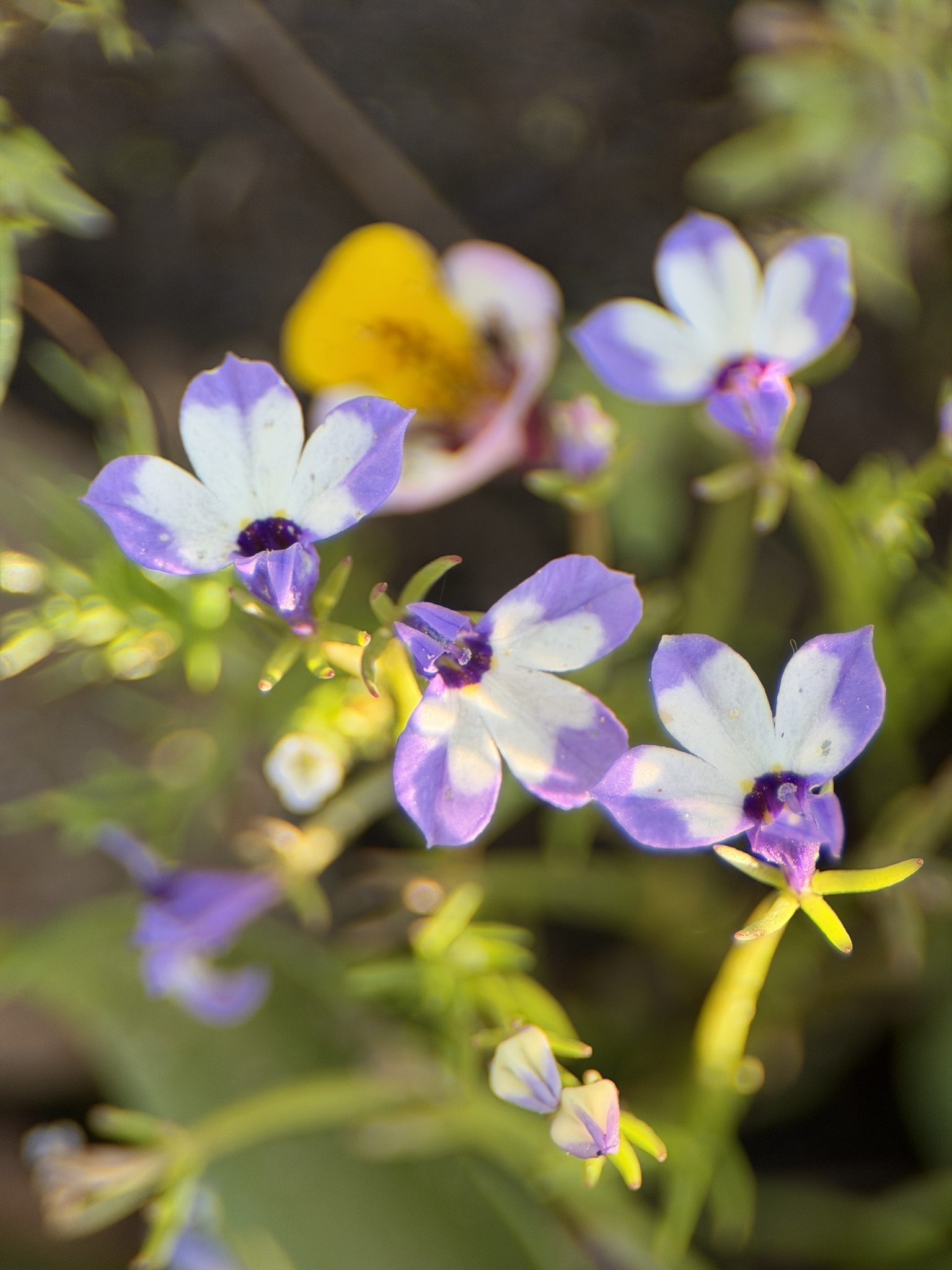

Scientific classification
- Kingdom: Plantae
- Clade: Embryophytes
- Clade: Tracheophytes
- Clade: Spermatophytes
- Clade: Angiosperms
- Clade: Eudicots
- Clade: Asterids
- Order: Asterales
- Family: Campanulaceae
- Genus: Downingia
- Species: D. montana

Binomial name
- Downingia montana Greene

= Downingia montana =

Species of flowering plant

Downingia montana is a species of flowering plant in the bellflower family known by the common name Sierra calicoflower. This showy wildflower is native to California, where it lives in the meadows and pine forests of the high mountains. Its range may extend into Oregon. This annual grows an erect stem, which may branch or not, with a few sparse small, pointed leaves. Atop the stem is usually one tubular flower. The upper lip is made up of two narrow, pointed lobes usually a shade of lavender, and the lower lip is the same color, with a central field of white and two prominent projections which may be colored yellow and dark purple. The lower lip has three lobes, each of which may have a tooth. The fruit is a capsule one to four centimeters long.

== Taxonomy ==
The Latin specific epithet montana refers to mountains or coming from mountains.
