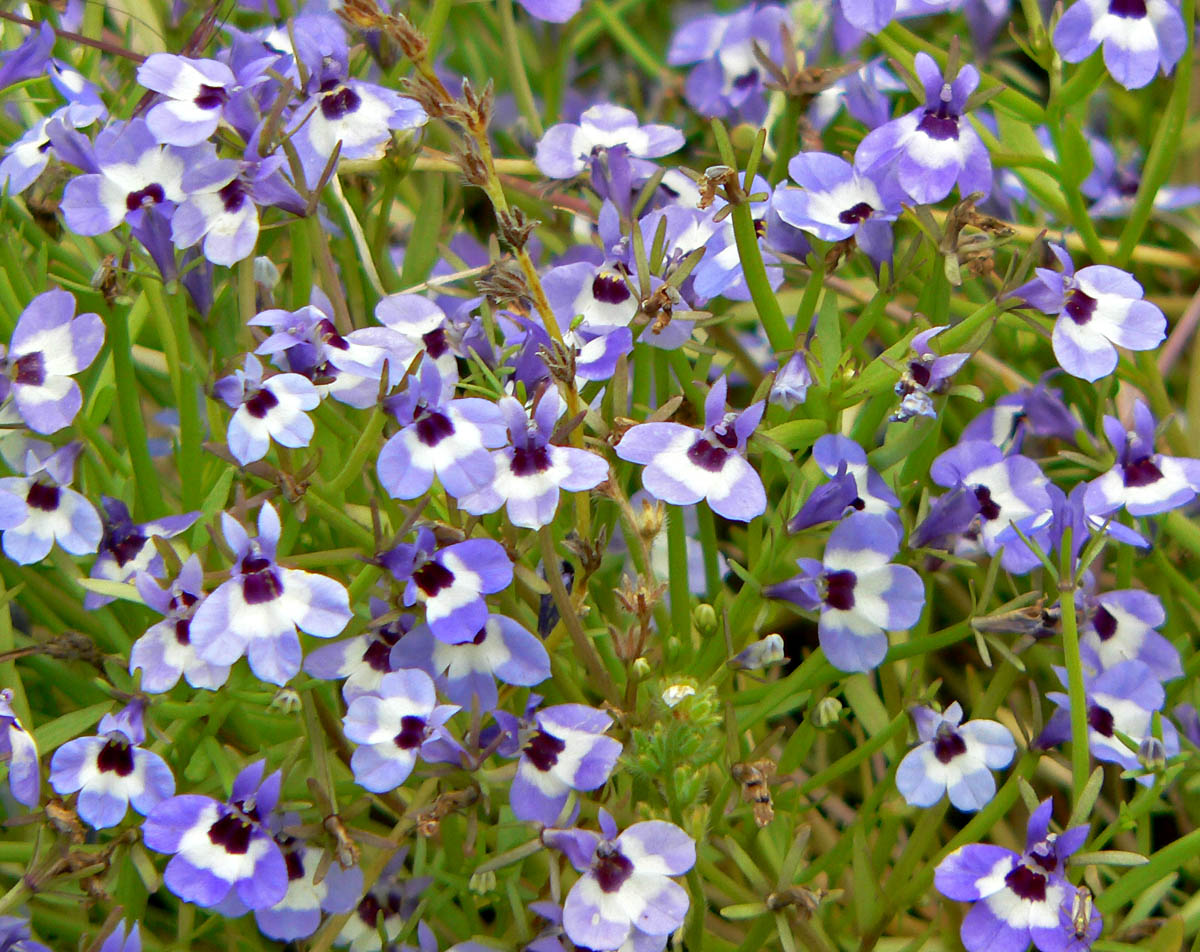
- Downingia concolor

Scientific classification
- Kingdom: Plantae
- Clade: Tracheophytes
- Clade: Angiosperms
- Clade: Eudicots
- Clade: Asterids
- Order: Asterales
- Family: Campanulaceae
- Subfamily: Lobelioideae
- Genus: Downingia; Torr.

Type species
- Downingia elegans

Species
- 13: see text

Synonyms
- Bolelia Raf.

= Downingia =

Genus of flowering plants in the bellflower family Campanulaceae

Downingia is a genus of 13 annual plants native to western North America and Chile. Commonly known as calico flowers, they are notable for forming mass displays of small but colorful blooms around vernal pools. A number are uncommon endemics in California.

The stems may be decumbent or erect, 10–40 cm in length, with narrow cauline leaves that may drop off before the flower develops. The flowers are typically inverted by the twisting of the ovary during blooming. Colors range from blue and pink to white, with the lower (larger) lip including a white or yellow patch. The lower lip generally consists of three lobes, while the upper lip is much smaller and has two lobes.

The genus is named after American horticulturalist A. J. Downing (1815-1852).

== Species ==
Image	Scientific name	Common name	Distribution
	Downingia bacigalupii	Bach's calicoflower or Bacigalupi's downingia	western United States from California to Idaho
	Downingia bella	Hoover's calicoflower or Hoover's Downingia	Riverside County to areas in the Great Central Valley, California
	Downingia bicornuta	doublehorn calicoflower	United States from California to Idaho
	Downingia concolor	maroonspot calicoflower and fringed downingia	California
	Downingia cuspidata	toothed calicoflower	California to Mexico
	Downingia elegans	elegant calicoflower or Californian lobelia	western North America from California to British Columbia
	Downingia insignis	harlequin calicoflower or cupped downingia	western United States from California to Idaho
	Downingia laeta	Great Basin calicoflower	California to Saskatchewan
	Downingia montana	Sierra calicoflower	California
	Downingia ornatissima	folded calicoflower	California
	Downingia pulchella	flat-face calicoflower or valley calicoflower	Tehachapi Mountains to the San Francisco Bay Area, California
	Downingia pusilla	dwarf calicoflower	Chile and the US state of California
	Downingia yina	Cascade calicoflower	Washington to northern California
