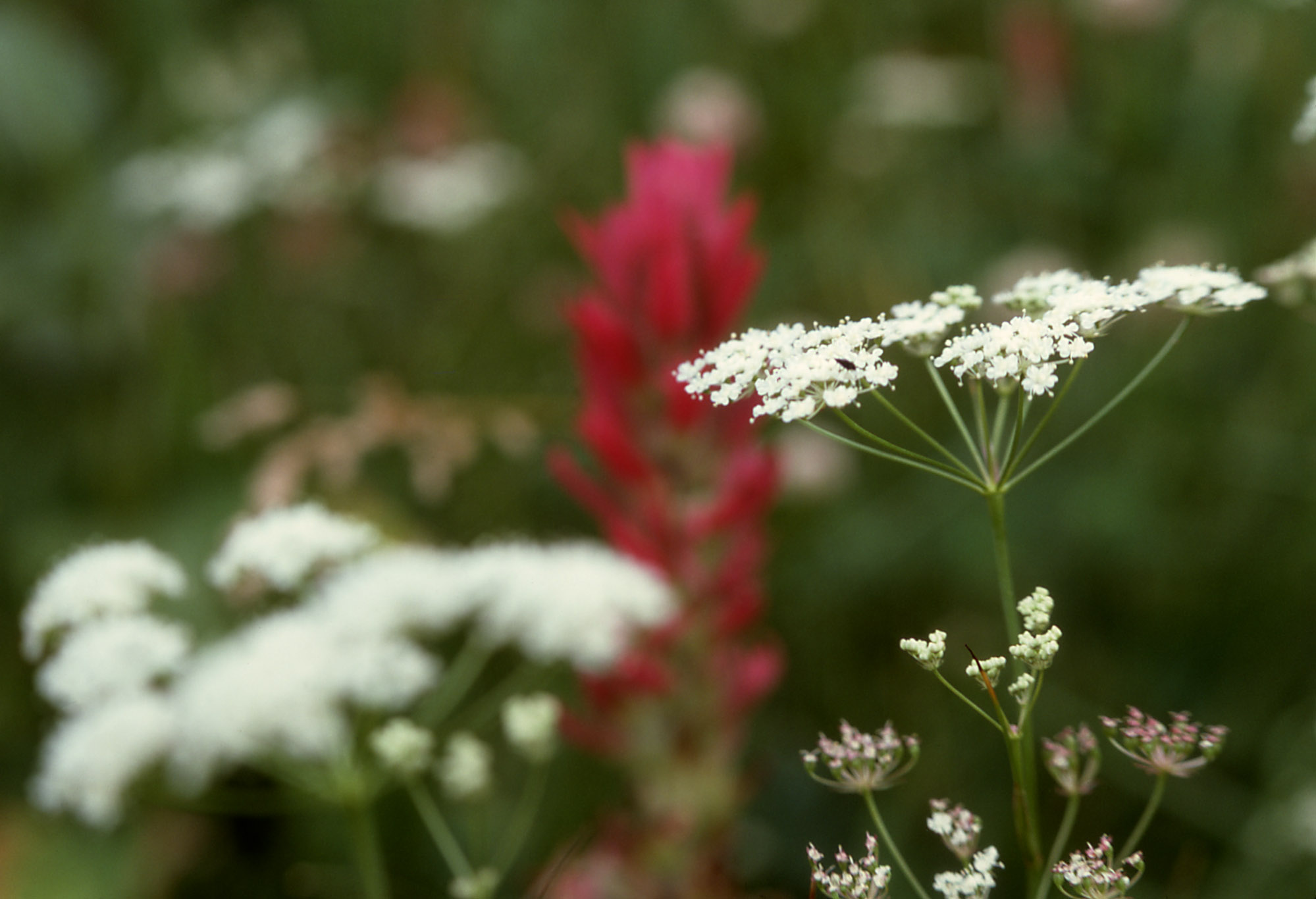
- Perideridia gairdneri subsp. borealis

Scientific classification
- Kingdom: Plantae
- Clade: Tracheophytes
- Clade: Angiosperms
- Clade: Eudicots
- Clade: Asterids
- Order: Apiales
- Family: Apiaceae
- Subfamily: Apioideae
- Tribe: Oenantheae
- Genus: Perideridia; Rchb.

Type species
- Perideridia americana (Nutt.) Rchb. ex Steud. 1829

Species
- About 12; see text

= Perideridia =

Genus of flowering plants

Perideridia is a genus of plants in the family Apiaceae. Plants in this genus are known generally as yampah or yampa. They are native to western North America. Similar in appearance to other plants of the family Apiaceae, they have umbels of white flowers.

== Name ==
The genus is based on the Greek word perideri, meaning 'necklace'.

== Description ==
The plants have a unique appearance for members of the parsley family, and are tall (1–3 feet) and grasslike, with threadlike leaves 1–6 inches long that resemble blades of grass. The plants effectively mimic tall grass and are virtually invisible until they flower, since they tend to grow in grassy meadows, and prefer full sunlight. Like most members of the parsley family, yampah produces umbels of white flowers. The small roots of yampah are about the size of a large unshelled peanut.

== Distribution and habitat ==
The plants are widely distributed in moist open meadows and hillsides up to 7,500 feet (2,300 m) across Western North America.

== Uses ==
Plains Indians named the plant 'Yampah' and consumed its starchy bulbs, some of which taste like carrots.

Perideridia gairdneri was an important staple crop of Native Americans in Western North America. The nutlike roots of the plant are crunchy and mildly sweet, and resemble water chestnuts in texture and flavor.

Yampah roots were either baked or steamed, and were reported to have excellent flavor and nutritional qualities. The seeds of yampah were used as a seasoning and resemble caraway seeds in flavor. Yampah roots contain rapidly assimilatable carbohydrates, and were used by hunters and runners as a high energy food to enhance physical endurance.

Uncooked yampah roots are a gentle laxative if consumed in excess and were used medicinally for this purpose.

It resembles the highly toxic poison hemlock and water hemlock.

== Species ==
Image	Name	Common name	Distribution	Cytology
	Perideridia americana	eastern yampah	Midwestern United States	n=20
	Perideridia bacigalupii	Mother Lode yampah, Bacigalupi's yampah	Sierra Nevada foothills, California	
	Perideridia bolanderi	Bolander's yampah	western United States	n=19
	Perideridia californica	California yampah	Central Coast Ranges and a section of the Sierra Nevada foothills, California	n=22
	Perideridia erythrorhiza	redroot yampah, western yampah	Oregon in the United States	
	Perideridia gairdneri	Gardner's yampah, common yampah, Indian caraway	western North America from southwestern Canada to California to New Mexico	n=40,60
	Perideridia howellii	Howell's yampah	Oregon and northern California	n=20
	Perideridia kelloggii	Kellogg's yampah	San Francisco Bay Area, and the Sierra Nevada foothills, California	n=20
	Perideridia lemmonii	Lemmon's yampah	from southeastern Oregon, western Nevada, and the mountains of eastern California	
	Perideridia leptocarpa	narrowseed yampah	California, Oregon	n=17
	Perideridia montana	Gairdner's Yampah	Montana	
	Perideridia oregana	Oregon yampah, squaw potato	Oregon and California in the western United States	n=8, 9, 10
	Perideridia parishii	Parish's yampah, Sierra Queen Anne's lace	southwestern United States	n=19
	Perideridia pringlei	adobe yampah	California	n=20
