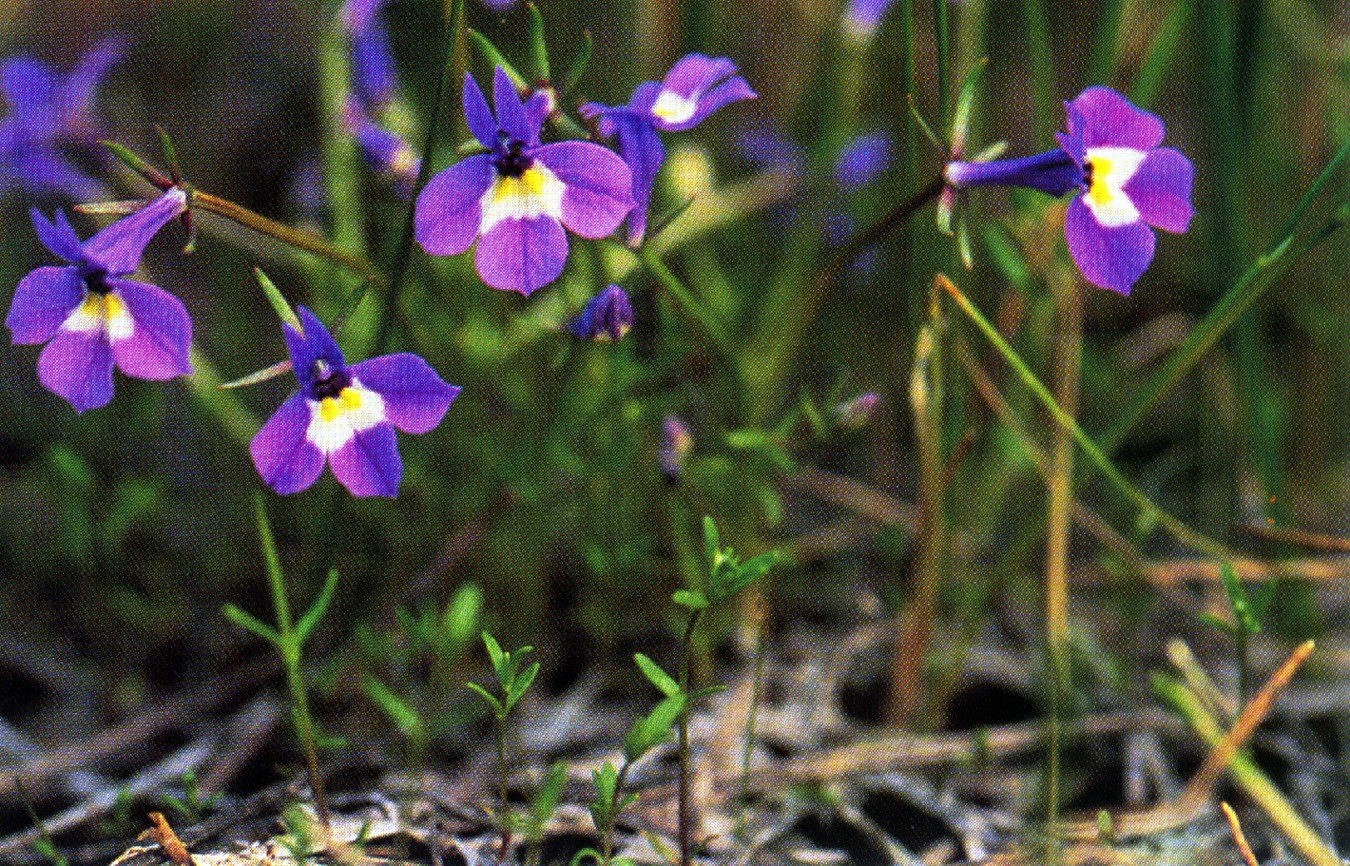

Scientific classification
- Kingdom: Plantae
- Clade: Tracheophytes
- Clade: Angiosperms
- Clade: Eudicots
- Clade: Asterids
- Order: Asterales
- Family: Campanulaceae
- Genus: Downingia
- Species: D. bicornuta

Binomial name
- Downingia bicornuta A.Gray

= Downingia bicornuta =

Species of flowering plant

Downingia bicornuta is a species of flowering plant in the bellflower family known by the common name doublehorn calicoflower and double-horned downingia. This showy wildflower is native to the western United States from California to Idaho, where it is a resident of lakesides and vernal pool ecosystems.

== Description ==
This annual grows on a branching erect stem with small leaves at intervals. At the top of each stem branch is one or more flowers, each between one and two centimeters wide. The flower has two long, narrow, pointed upper lobes which may be blue or purple. The three lower lobes are fused into one three-lobed surface, which is blue or purple with two bright yellow blotches rimmed with white in the center. The mouth of the flower tube is surrounded by knobby projections of the sepals. The fruit is a dehiscent capsule three to seven centimeters long.
