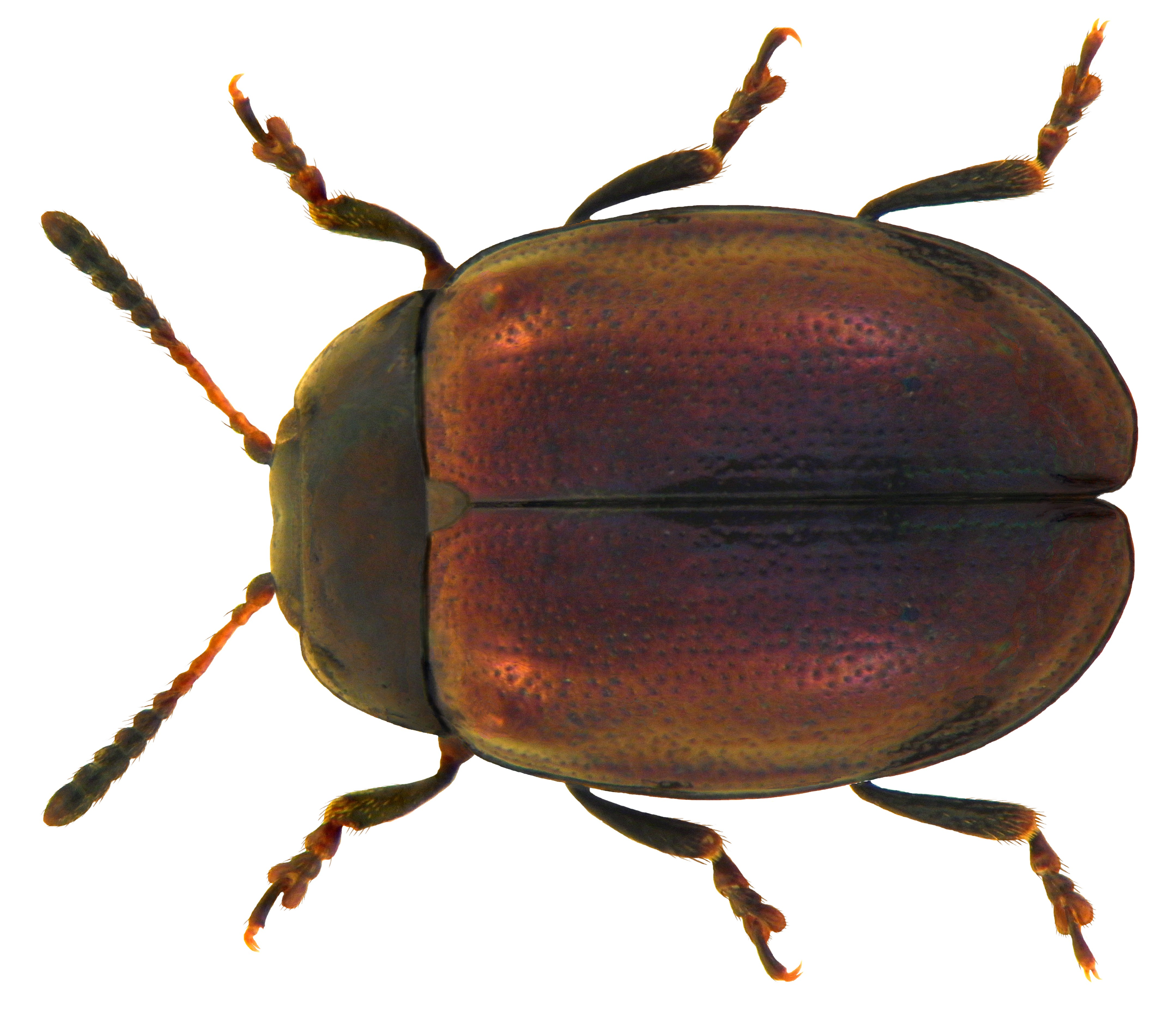

Scientific classification
- Domain: Eukaryota
- Kingdom: Animalia
- Phylum: Arthropoda
- Class: Insecta
- Order: Coleoptera
- Suborder: Polyphaga
- Infraorder: Cucujiformia
- Family: Chrysomelidae
- Genus: Plagiodera
- Species: P. versicolora

Binomial name
- Plagiodera versicolora Laicharting, 1781

= Plagiodera versicolora =

Species of beetle

Plagiodera versicolora is a species of leaf beetle (subfamily Chrysomelinae) in the genus Plagiodera.

== Description ==
Plagiodera versicolora grows to 2.5 - 4.8 mm in length and is metallic blue or green, occasionally purplish to black in colour.

== Habitat ==
Plagiodera versicolora lives in various habitats, but usually near water. Adults feed on leaves and pollen of willow and poplar trees, especially Salix fragilis ('crack willow'). It is predated by the shieldbug Zicrona caerulea, several ladybird species and the larva of a hoverfly (Parasyrphus sp.).

== Life cycle ==
Adults overwinter under logs, loose bark and among vegetable litter near the host plant and become active during April. Fully developed larvae may be found from June onwards and pupation occurs under the leaves of the host plant. Freshly emerged adults occur from mid-July and fly in hot weather, occasionally found far from their hosts, especially along river margins.

== Distribution ==
It is fairly common in central and southern England, with scattered records from Wales and Ireland and no records from Scotland. It has been introduced in North America.

== Gallery ==
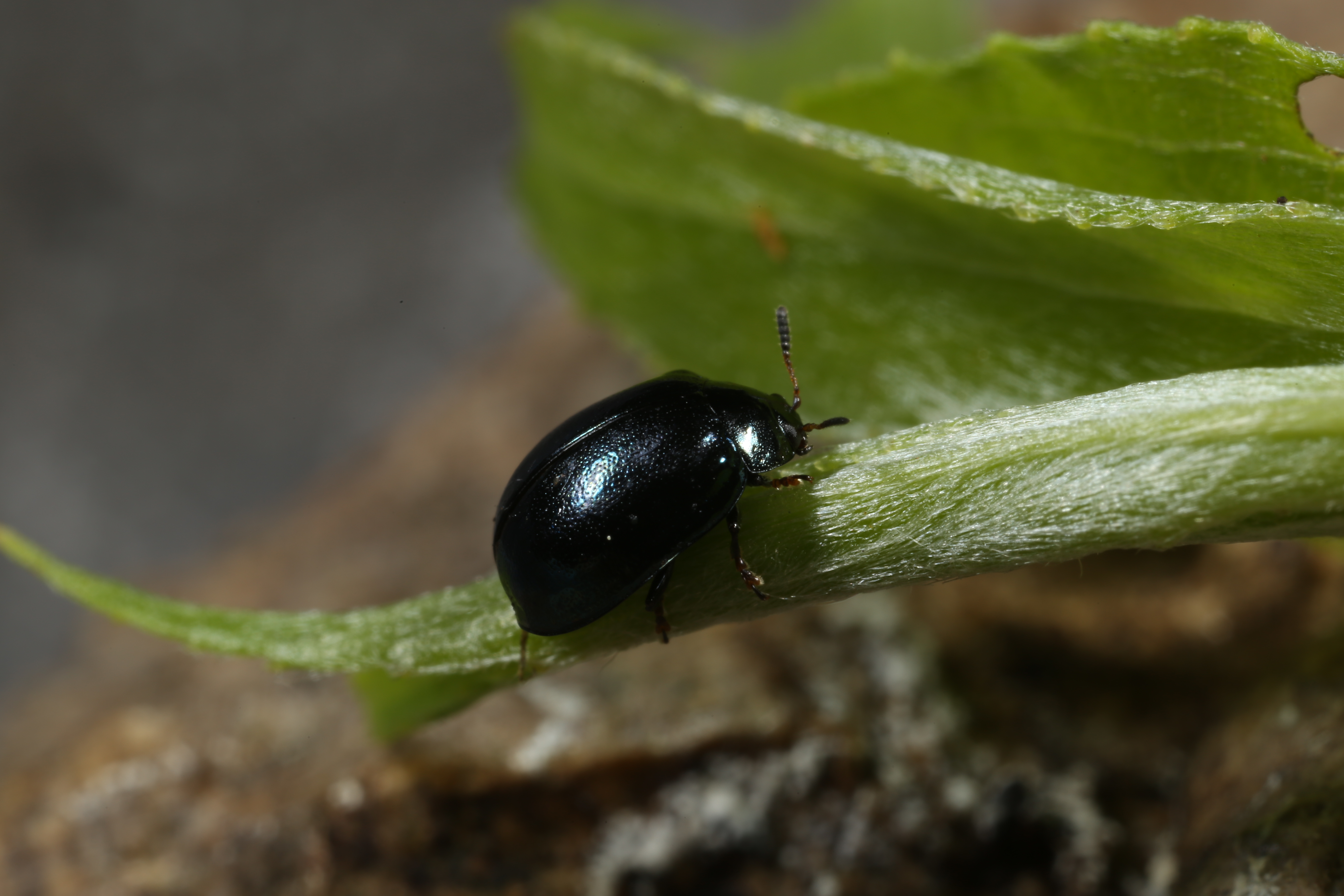
Plagiodera versicolora

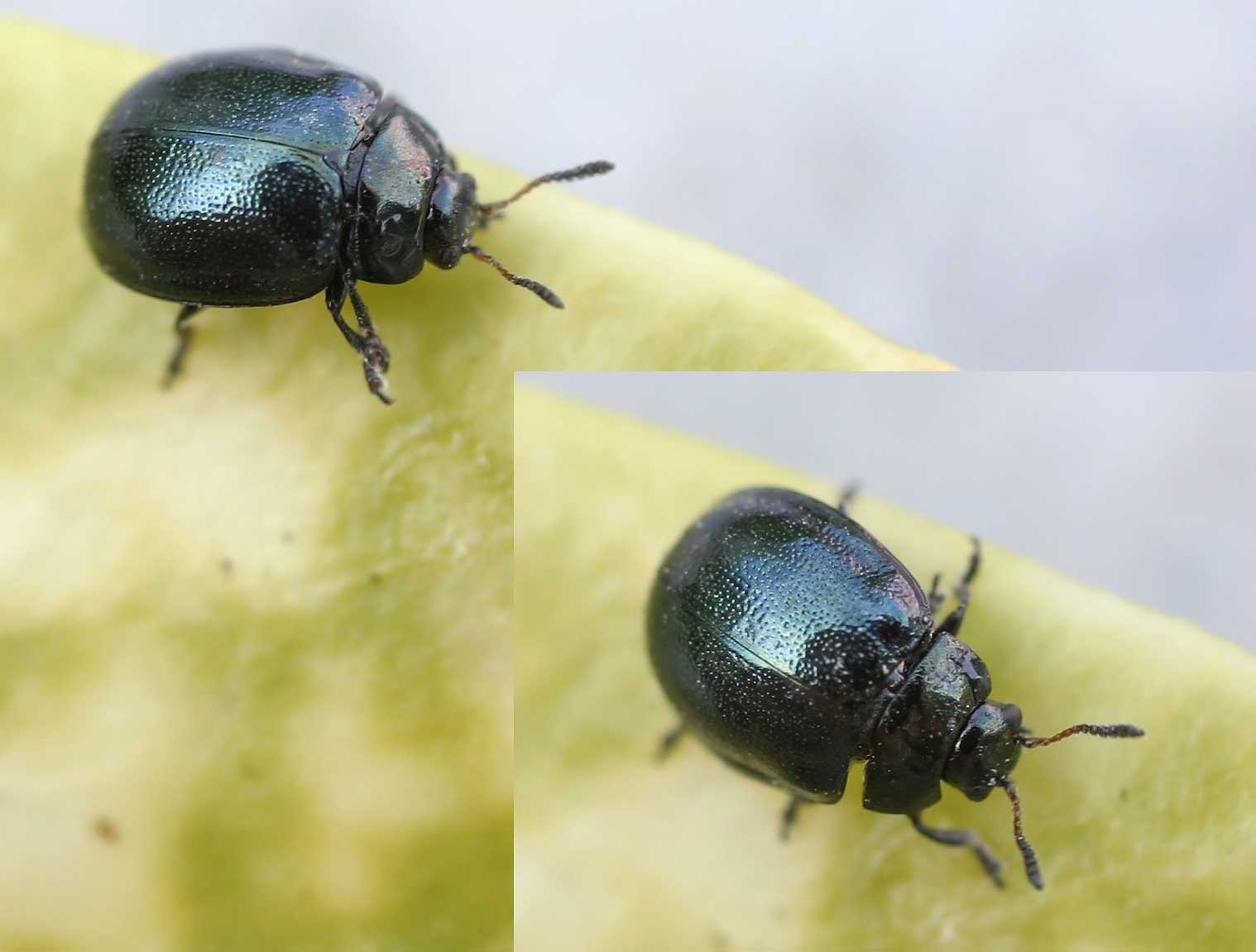

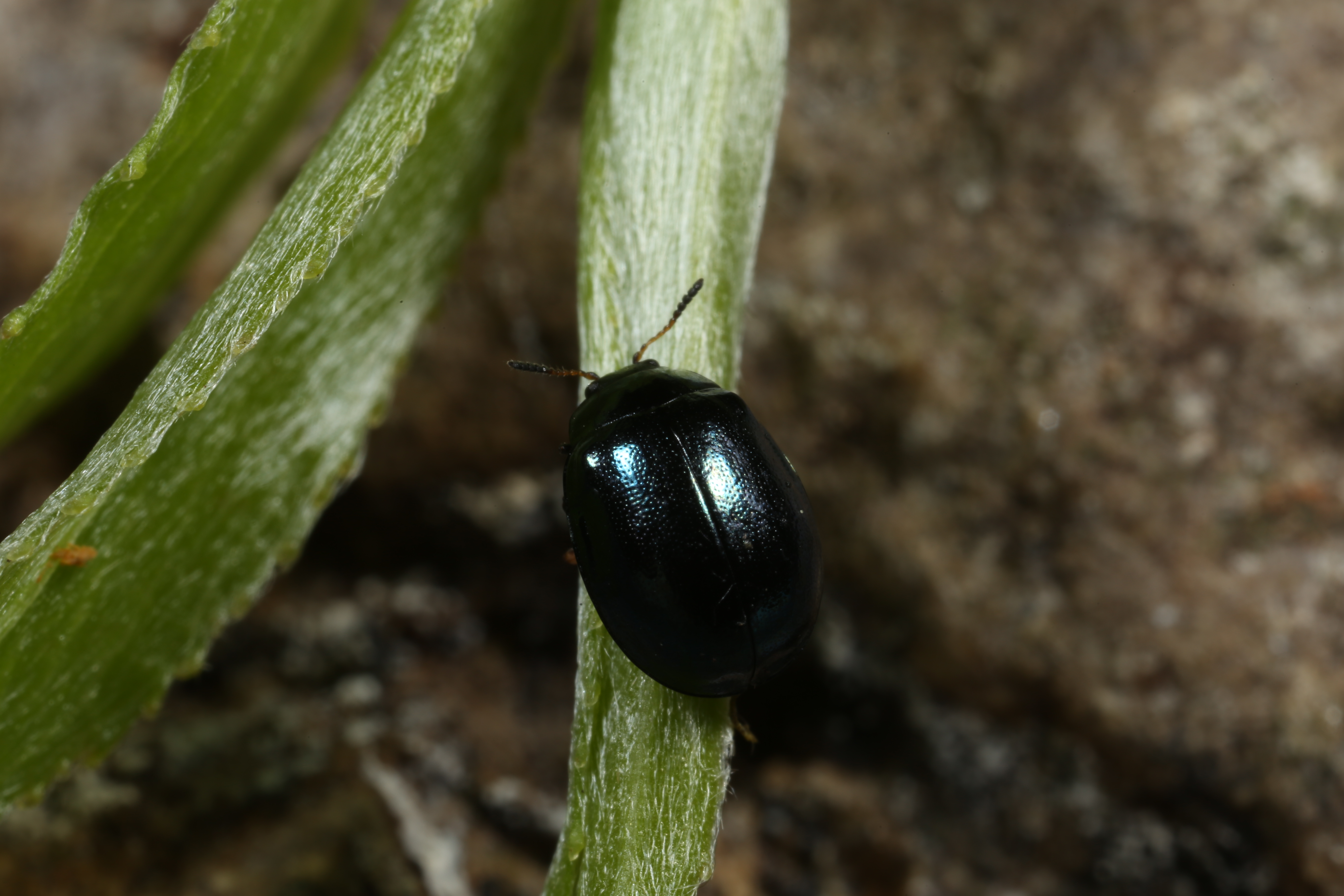

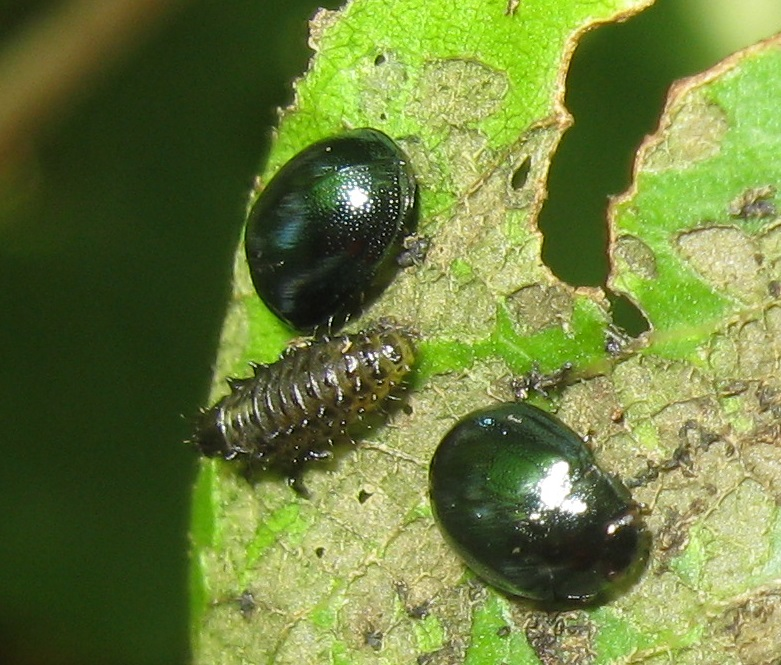
Larva and adults
