= Perideridia bacigalupii =

Scientific classification
- Kingdom: Plantae
- Clade: Tracheophytes
- Clade: Angiosperms
- Clade: Eudicots
- Clade: Asterids
- Order: Apiales
- Family: Apiaceae
- Genus: Perideridia
- Species: P. bacigalupii

Binomial name
- Perideridia bacigalupii T.I.Chuang & Constance

Species of flowering plant

Perideridia bacigalupii is an uncommon species of flowering plant in the family Apiaceae known by the common names Mother Lode yampah and Bacigalupi's perideridia. It is endemic to California, where it is known only from the northern and central Sierra Nevada foothills. It is a member of the flora in chaparral and pine woodlands. It is a perennial herb which may exceed 1.5 meters in maximum height, its slender, erect stem growing from tubers. Leaves near the base of the plant have blades up to 40 centimeters long which are divided into many narrow subdivided lobes. Leaves higher on the plant are smaller and less divided. The inflorescence is a compound umbel of many spherical clusters of small white flowers. These yield ribbed, oblong-shaped fruits about half a centimeter long.

The plant was first described in 1969. The plant's Latin and common names are for the American botanist Rimo Bacigalupi (1901–1996).
