= Downingia insignis =

Scientific classification
- Kingdom: Plantae
- Clade: Tracheophytes
- Clade: Angiosperms
- Clade: Eudicots
- Clade: Asterids
- Order: Asterales
- Family: Campanulaceae
- Genus: Downingia
- Species: D. insignis

Binomial name
- Downingia insignis Greene

Synonyms
- Bolelia insignis (Greene) Greene

Species of flowering plant

Downingia insignis is a species of flowering plant in the bellflower family known by the common names harlequin calicoflower and cupped downingia. This showy wildflower is native to the western United States from California to Idaho, where it is a resident of lakesides and vernal pool ecosystems.

== Description ==
This annual grows on a branching erect stem with small, pointed leaves at intervals. At the top of each stem branch is one or more flowers, each one to one and a half centimeters wide. The upper lip is made up of two narrow, pointed lobes which are purple or blue with prominent dark veining. The lower lip is the same veined color with a central blotch of white. In the white area are two yellow spots, which are raised into nipplelike projections, and sometimes spots of darker purple near the mouth of the tube. The lower lip is divided into three lobes which may be pointed or rounded. The fruit is a capsule four to eight centimeters long. The stamens are fused into an erect stalk holding a light-colored anther.
