= Plagiodera arizonae =

Scientific classification
- Domain: Eukaryota
- Kingdom: Animalia
- Phylum: Arthropoda
- Class: Insecta
- Order: Coleoptera
- Suborder: Polyphaga
- Infraorder: Cucujiformia
- Family: Chrysomelidae
- Genus: Plagiodera
- Species: P. arizonae

Binomial name
- Plagiodera arizonae Crotch, 1873

Species of beetle

Plagiodera arizonae is a species of leaf beetles of the tribe Chrysomelini that can be found in Arizona. The species have black wings and red head and legs.
