= Rimo Bacigalupi =

American botanist (1901–1996)

- Born: Rimo Carlo Felice Bacigalupi; March 24, 1901; San Francisco, California
- Died: August 23, 1996 (aged 95); Berkeley, California
- Education: Lowell High School (San Francisco)
- Alma mater: Stanford University; Harvard University
- Scientific career
- Fields: Botany, taxonomy
- Workplaces: Jepson Herbarium, University of California, Berkeley
- Thesis: A monograph of the genus Perezia, section Acourtia (1931)
- Doctoral advisor: B. L. Robinson
- Author abbrev. (botany): Bacig.

Rimo Bacigalupi (1901–1996), known as "Bach", (Note: The nickname "Bach" was pronounced as English "Batch", the first syllable of "Bacigalupi".) was an American botanist and taxonomist, an expert in the flora of California. He was the first curator of the Jepson Herbarium at the University of California, Berkeley.

== Biography ==
Rimo was a son of Prospero and Gisella Bacigalupi, who were of Genovese origin. He was educated at Lowell High School and entered Stanford University intending to become a lawyer, but changed his major from English to botany, receiving the A.B. degree in 1923 and A.M. in 1925. He then taught botany and Italian at Mills College before studying at Harvard for his Ph.D. degree in botany which was awarded in 1931. He worked for the California Forest Experimental Station of the U.S. Forest Service 1933–1938. He served with the U.S. Army during World War II, then returned to Stanford as an instructor in biology. He was president of the California Botanical Society 1957–1958.

When Willis Linn Jepson, professor of botany at UC Berkeley, died in 1946, he left his estate to the University of California for the purpose of continuing his studies of Californian flora. With the bequest the university established the Jepson Herbarium and Library, and Bacigalupi was appointed its first curator in 1950. He retired in 1968 but continued his botanical studies until suffering a stroke in 1983.

Besides his mastery of botany, Bacigalupi was an expert in operatic scores, Romance languages, postage stamps and railroads. He was a member of the Sierra Club for 71 years.

== Eponyms ==
- Perideridia bacigalupii
- Deinandra bacigalupii
- Downingia bacigalupii
