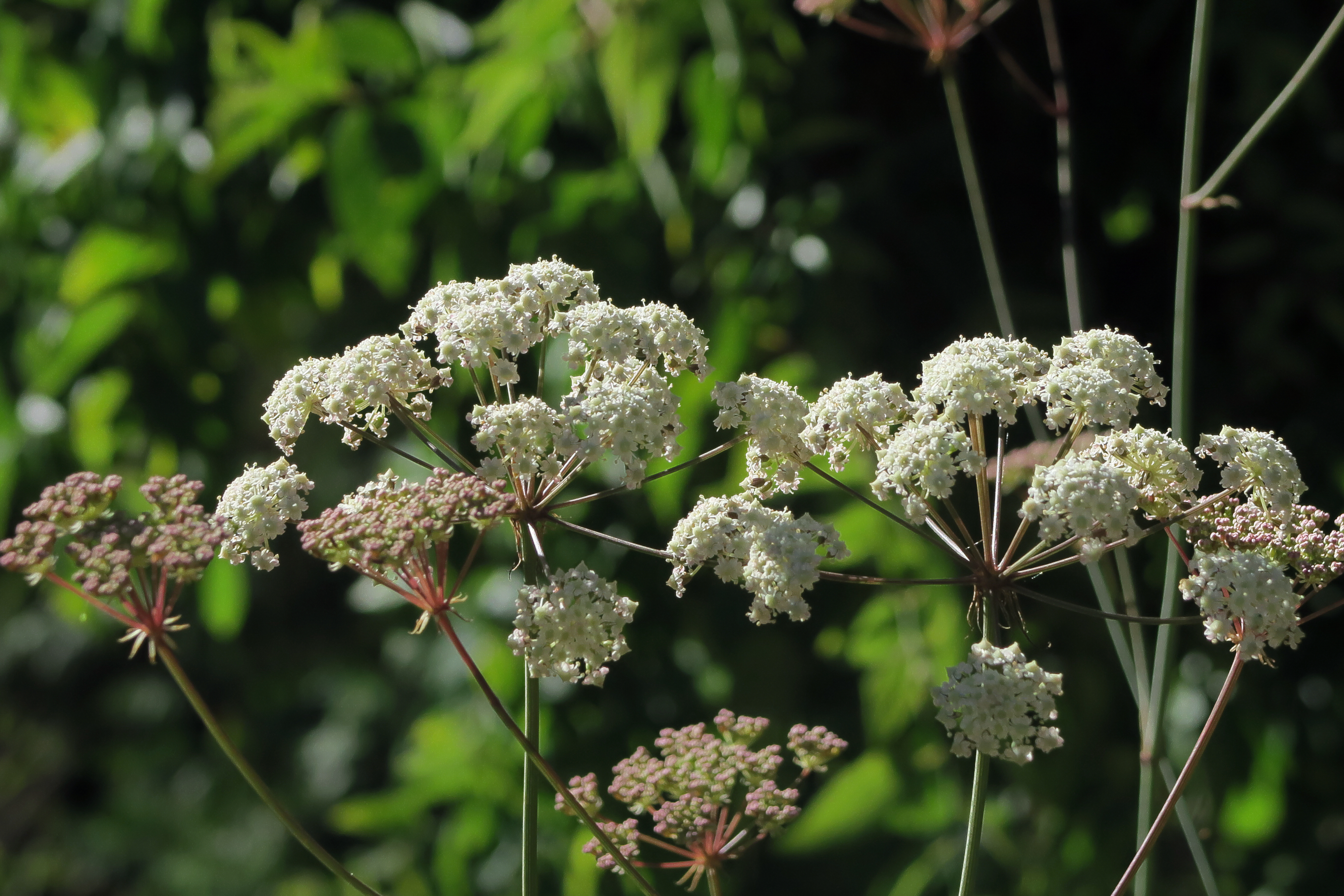

Scientific classification
- Kingdom: Plantae
- Clade: Tracheophytes
- Clade: Angiosperms
- Clade: Eudicots
- Clade: Asterids
- Order: Apiales
- Family: Apiaceae
- Genus: Perideridia
- Species: P. kelloggii

Binomial name
- Perideridia kelloggii (A.Gray) Mathias

Synonyms
- Atenia kelloggii (A.Gray) Greene

= Perideridia kelloggii =

Species of flowering plant

Perideridia kelloggii is a species of flowering plant in the family Apiaceae known by the common name Kellogg's yampah. It is endemic to California, where it is known from the north and central coasts, the San Francisco Bay Area, and the Sierra Nevada foothills. It grows in grassland habitat, sometimes on serpentine soils. It is a perennial herb which may reach 5 feet (1.5 meters) in maximum height, its slender, erect stem growing from a cluster of long, narrow, fibrous roots each up to 6 inches (15 centimeters) long. Leaves near the base of the plant have blades up to 18 inches (45 centimeters) wide which are divided into many leaflets subdivided into narrow, elongated lobes. The inflorescence is a compound umbel of many spherical clusters of small white flowers. These yield ribbed, oblong-shaped fruits each about half a centimeter long.
