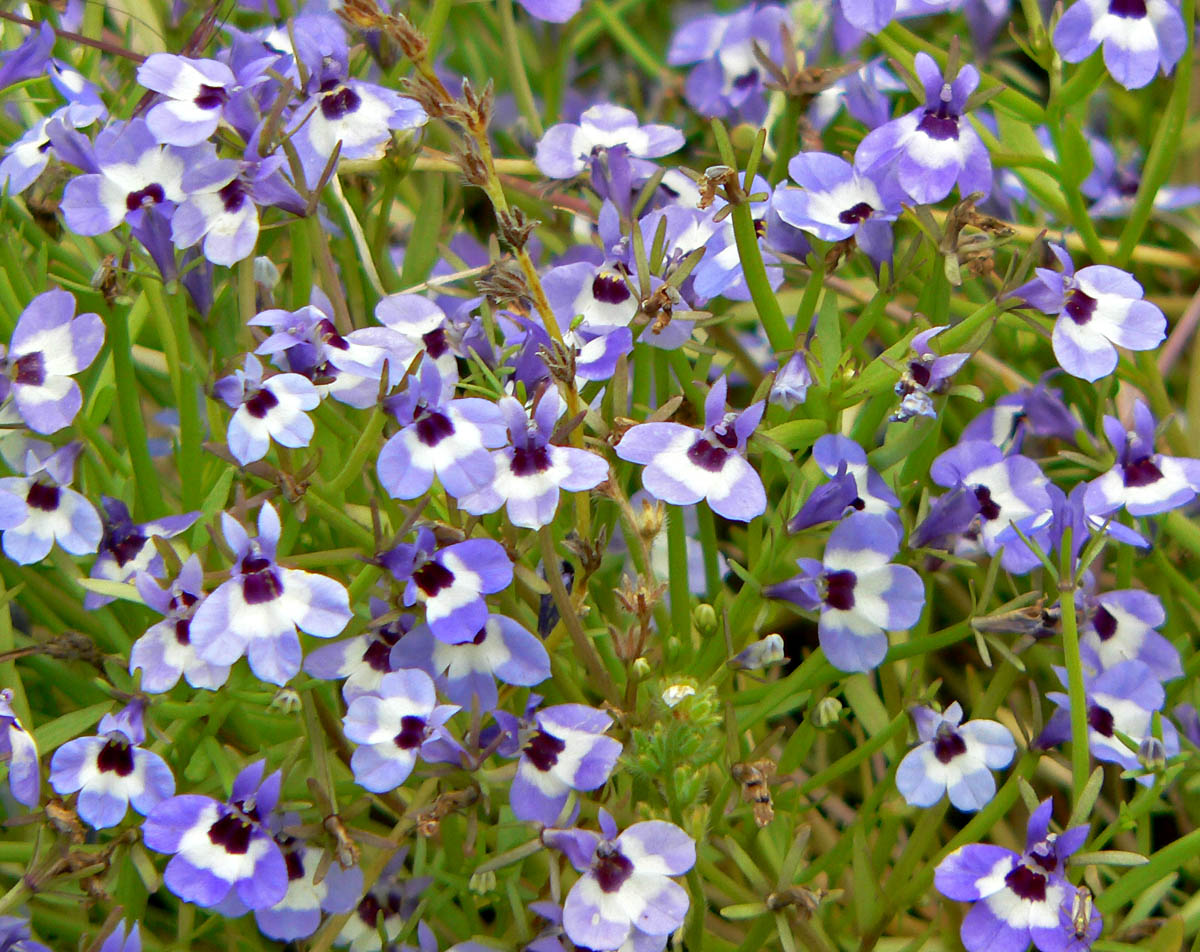

Conservation status
- Apparently Secure (NatureServe)

Scientific classification
- Kingdom: Plantae
- Clade: Tracheophytes
- Clade: Angiosperms
- Clade: Eudicots
- Clade: Asterids
- Order: Asterales
- Family: Campanulaceae
- Genus: Downingia
- Species: D. concolor

Binomial name
- Downingia concolor Greene

= Downingia concolor =

Species of flowering plant

Downingia concolor is a species of flowering plant in the bellflower family known by the common names maroonspot calicoflower and fringed downingia. This showy wildflower is endemic to California, where it is a resident of ponds and vernal pool ecosystems in the northern part of the state.

== Description ==
This annual grows on a branching erect stem with small leaves at intervals. At the top of each stem branch is one or more flowers, each about a centimeter wide. The tubular flower has two long, narrow, pointed upper lobes which may be blue or purple. The three lower lobes are fused into one three-lobed surface, which is blue or purple with a large blotch of white in the center and blotches of maroon toward the mouth of the tube. There may also be speckles of yellow.

== Flower ==
The corolla is anywhere from 7–13 mm long and is mostly smooth. However, the upper lobes typically have small and rough hairs along their edges. The side lobes are usually deeper than the upper lobes. While there are different varieties of Downingia concolor that sometimes bring different colors upon the petals, most varieties have a light blue lower lip with a white center. Further into the throat, a semi-square purple spot will be observed. The anthers (pollen-bearing systems) may protrude from the center slightly, with an angle of less than 45°. The ovary varies from smooth to rough and spiny.

== Varieties ==
Of Downingia concolor, there are two main variants: var. brevior and var. concolor. The main difference between these variants is their mature fruits. Fruits of var. brevior are typically smaller (12–30 mm) and can be readily observed splitting open. Additionally, the lines that appear on the mature fruit of the brevior are translucent, while the fruits of the concolor are often not translucent. The mature fruits of the concolor variety are generally larger (30–50 mm) and become dehiscent much later in maturity.

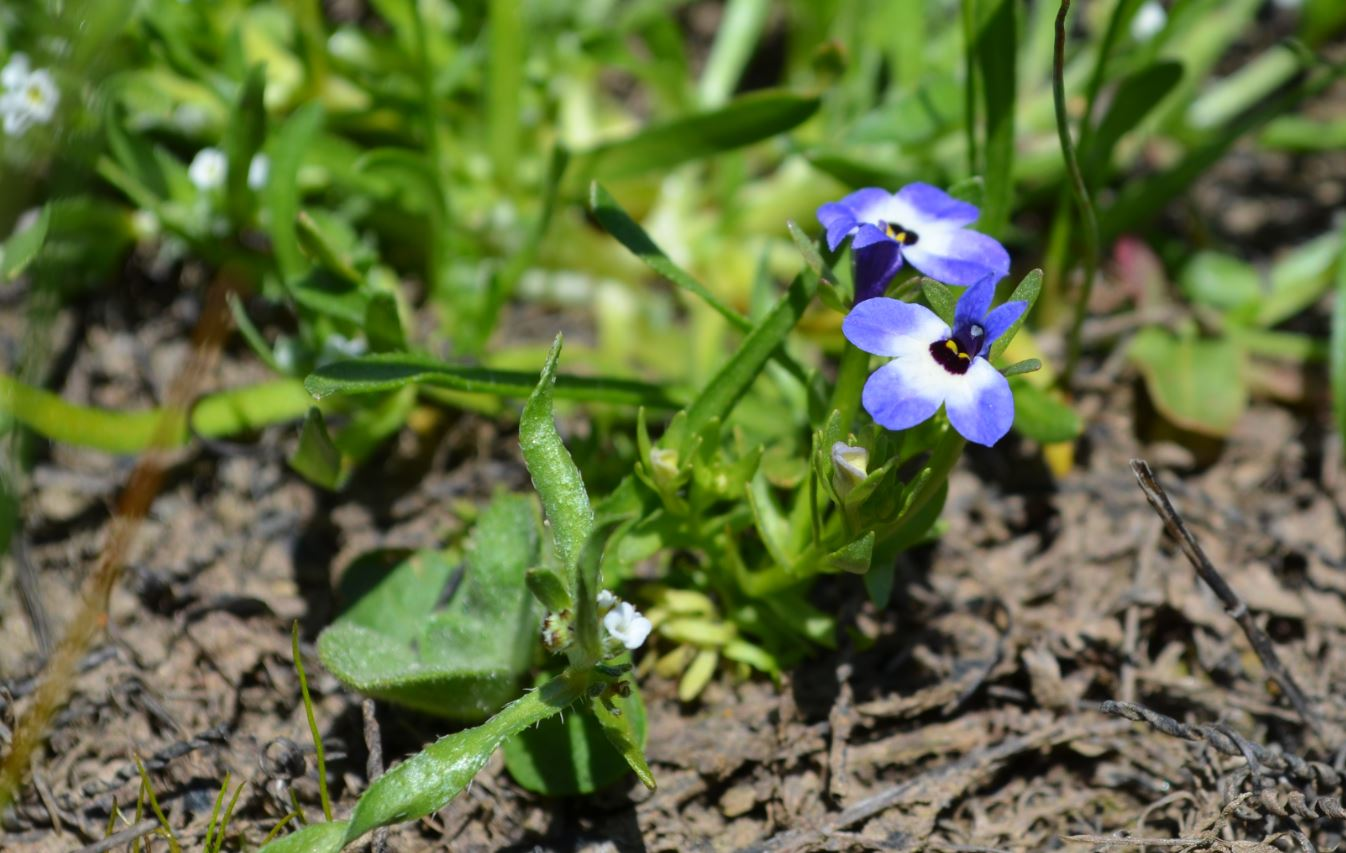
Downingia concolor var. brevior

== Habitat and ecology ==
This wildflower is most common in the northern coastal regions of California. Forms of this plant have also been found in southern California regions. Maroonspot calicoflower can be found in the following counties: Del Norte, Humboldt, Mendocino, Trinity, Lake, Tehama, Glenn, Colusa, Yolo, Sonoma, Napa, Solano, Contra Costa, Alameda, Santa Clara, Santa Cruz, San Mateo, San Benito, Monterey, San Luis Obispo, Sacramento, Santa Barbara, Ventura, Los Angeles, Orange, and San Diego.

The preferred ecosystem of Downingia concolor is seasonal wetlands. It particularly thrives in vernal pools and along the edges of ponds. These environments are very sensitive to the wet–dry cycle, which forces the flower to complete its life cycle quickly before the pools evaporate.

== Ecology and conservation ==
Living in vernal pools can be quite challenging for its inhabitants. Today, vernal pools are one of the most threatened wetland ecosystems in the state of California. The main challenge the maroonspot flower encounters is the seasonality of vernal pools. In the California winter, these pools are filled with rain. When spring comes along, the pools dry out. Because this cycle of wet to dry is heavily dependent on winter rain, changes in rainfall patterns can cause the environment to struggle. During particularly dry winters, many sites fail to produce flowers. This is also an issue on the local level because populations of Downingia concolor are often patchy, making the flower particularly vulnerable to local extinction.
