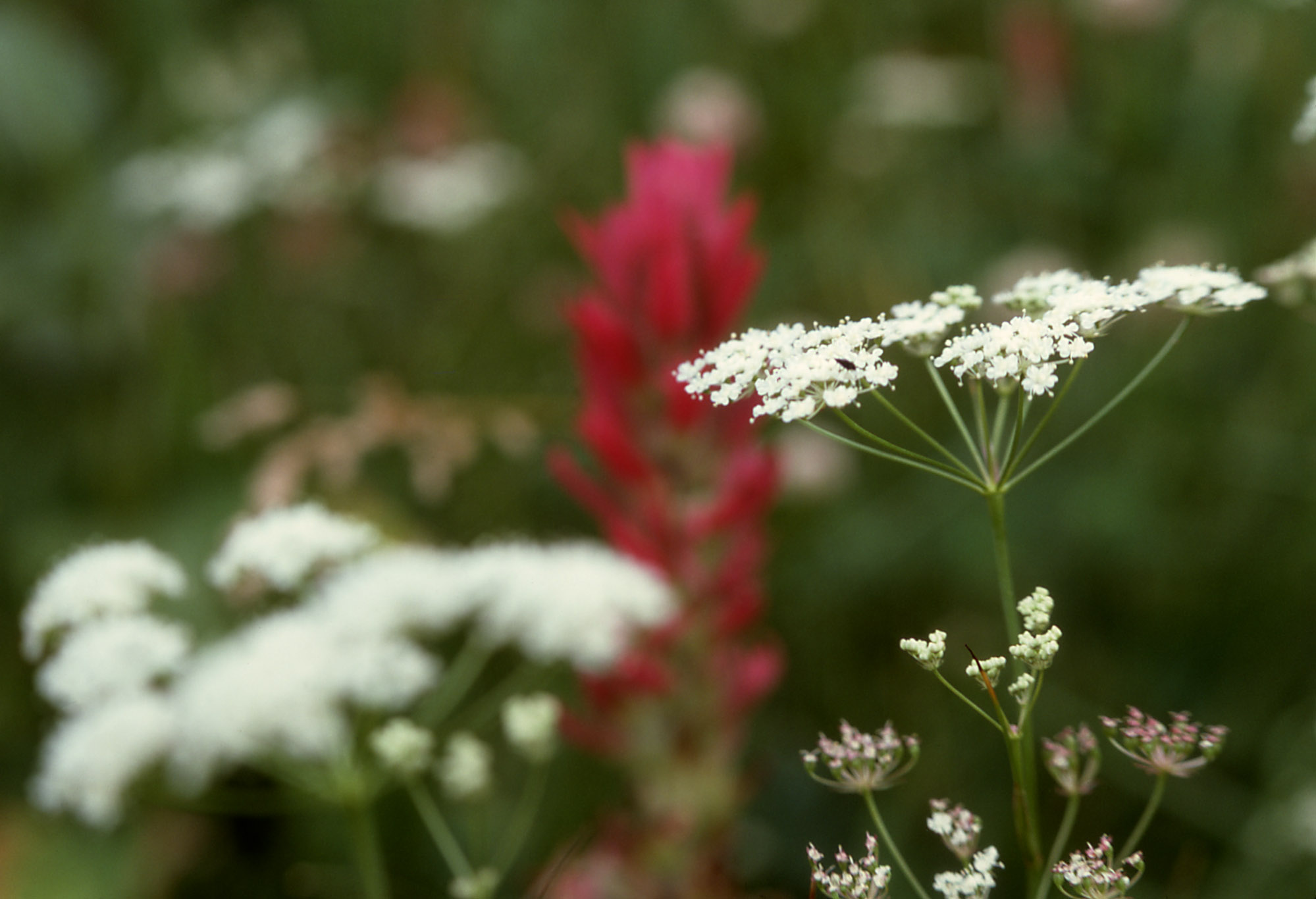

Conservation status
- Secure (NatureServe)

Scientific classification
- Kingdom: Plantae
- Clade: Tracheophytes
- Clade: Angiosperms
- Clade: Eudicots
- Clade: Asterids
- Order: Apiales
- Family: Apiaceae
- Genus: Perideridia
- Species: P. gairdneri

Binomial name
- Perideridia gairdneri (Hook. & Arn.) Mathias

Synonyms
- Atenia gairdneri Hook. & Arn. 1839; Carum gairdneri (Hook. & Arn.) A.Gray 1868; Edosmia gairdneri (Hook. & Arn.) Torr. & A.Gray 1840

= Perideridia gairdneri =

Species of flowering plant

Perideridia gairdneri is a species of flowering plant in the family Apiaceae known by the common names common yampah, Gardner's yampah and Squaw root. It is native to western North America from southwestern Canada to California to New Mexico, where it grows in many types of habitat. It is a perennial herb which grows to around .6–1 metre (2.0–3.3 ft). Its slender, erect stem grows from cylindrical tubers measuring up to 8 centimeters long. Leaves near the base of the plant have blades up to 35 centimeters long which are divided into many narrow, subdivided lobes. Leaves higher on the plant are smaller and less divided. The inflorescence is a compound umbel of many spherical clusters of small white flowers. These yield ribbed, rounded fruits each a few millimeters long.

The entire plant is edible, but caution should be maintained as it has a similar appearance to the carrot family's deadly water hemlock and poison hemlock. It was an important food plant, even a staple food, for many Native American groups, including the Blackfoot, Northern Paiute, Cheyenne and Comanche. It would seem certain that the term yampa would be a version on the Comanche name for the tuber, variously yap, and yampa. One of the main divisions of the Comanche, the Yapainuu, were named the yap eaters, whose chief was the famous Ten Bears. More commonly referred to as the Yamparikas, this division roamed in the Northern Oklahoma area in historic times. The tuberous roots could be eaten like potatoes, roasted, steamed, eaten fresh or dried, made into mush or pinole, used as flour and flavoring, and were also used medicinally. Meriwether Lewis encountered the plant in 1805 and 1806, referring to it as a species of fennel.

This food root is called cawíitx in Nez Perce, sawítk in Sahaptin and yap in Comanche. Blackfoot Indians knew the root by the name nits-ik-opa ("double root") and by those tribes of the Pacific Northwest as either yampa, ipo, or sa'-hweet.
