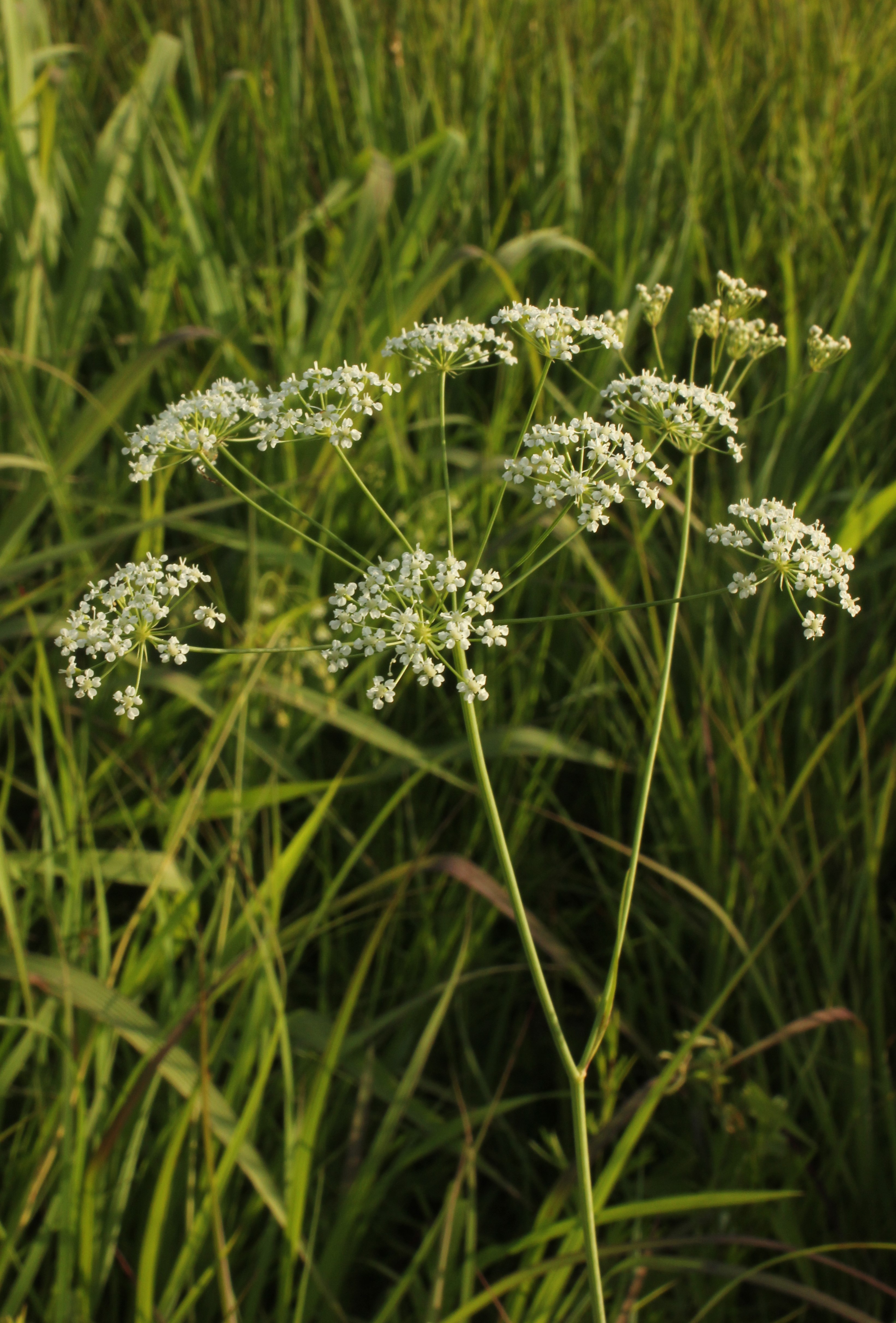
- Perideridia americana photographed in Missouri tallgrass prairie.

Conservation status
- Apparently Secure (NatureServe)

Scientific classification
- Kingdom: Plantae
- Clade: Tracheophytes
- Clade: Angiosperms
- Clade: Eudicots
- Clade: Asterids
- Order: Apiales
- Family: Apiaceae
- Genus: Perideridia
- Species: P. americana

Binomial name
- Perideridia americana (Nutt. ex DC.) Rchb.

= Perideridia americana =

Species of flowering plant

Perideridia americana is a species of flowering plant in the family Apiaceae known by the common names eastern yampah and wild dill. It has been found in 12 Midwestern United States, and is listed as threatened or endangered in at least 3 of them. In Missouri it is a conservation species of concern.

Wild dill grows in calcareous soils in many habitat types, including glades, upland prairies, and forests. It is a perennial herb whose upright stems are between 50 and 120 cm (20 and 47 in) tall, with sparse alternate doubly pinnate leaves ending in long tapering leaflets. The inflorescence is a compound umbel of many spherical clusters of small white flowers. The fruits are 3–5 mm (1/8–3/16 in) long with 5 slender ribs. After fruiting, it goes dormant until the next spring. Its root system has tubers, usually two per plant, 5–10 cm (2–4 in) underground.

The life cycle of this species was described in a 1993 paper.
