= Downingia pusilla =

Scientific classification
- Kingdom: Plantae
- Clade: Tracheophytes
- Clade: Angiosperms
- Clade: Eudicots
- Clade: Asterids
- Order: Asterales
- Family: Campanulaceae
- Genus: Downingia
- Species: D. pusilla

Binomial name
- Downingia pusilla (G.Don) Torr.

Synonyms
- Downingia humilis

Species of flowering plant

Downingia pusilla is a species of flowering plant in the bellflower family known by the common name dwarf calicoflower. This wildflower is found in two separate parts of the world, Chile and the US state of California. It grows in wet areas such as ditches and vernal pools. This annual is different from the other downingias in that its flowers are much smaller, reaching 4 millimeters in width at maximum. It grows erect stems with few pointed leaves. The tiny tubular flower is white or blue, with yellow spots near the mouth of the tube. The fruit is a capsule two or three centimeters long.
