= Plagiodera thymaloides =

Scientific classification
- Domain: Eukaryota
- Kingdom: Animalia
- Phylum: Arthropoda
- Class: Insecta
- Order: Coleoptera
- Suborder: Polyphaga
- Infraorder: Cucujiformia
- Family: Chrysomelidae
- Genus: Plagiodera
- Species: P. thymaloides

Binomial name
- Plagiodera thymaloides Stål, 1860

Species of beetle

Plagiodera thymaloides is a species of leaf beetle in the family Chrysomelidae. It is found in Central America and North America.
