= Downingia cuspidata =

Scientific classification
- Kingdom: Plantae
- Clade: Tracheophytes
- Clade: Angiosperms
- Clade: Eudicots
- Clade: Asterids
- Order: Asterales
- Family: Campanulaceae
- Genus: Downingia
- Species: D. cuspidata

Binomial name
- Downingia cuspidata (Greene) Greene ex Jepson

Species of flowering plant

Downingia cuspidata is a species of flowering plant in the bellflower family known by the common name toothed calicoflower. This showy wildflower is native to California, where it is a resident of ponds, meadows, and vernal pool ecosystems throughout the state. Its range may extend into Mexico.

This annual grows on a branching erect stem with small leaves at intervals. At the top of each stem branch is one or more flowers, each about a centimeter wide. The tubular flower has two long, narrow, pointed upper lobes which may be blue or purple to nearly white. The lower lip is fused into one three-lobed surface, which is blue, purple, or white with a large blotch or two smaller blotches of yellow in the center, outlined in white. Each lobe may have a toothlike point.
