= Perideridia howellii =

Scientific classification
- Kingdom: Plantae
- Clade: Tracheophytes
- Clade: Angiosperms
- Clade: Eudicots
- Clade: Asterids
- Order: Apiales
- Family: Apiaceae
- Genus: Perideridia
- Species: P. howellii

Binomial name
- Perideridia howellii (J.M.Coult. & Rose) Mathias

Species of flowering plant

Perideridia howellii is a species of flowering plant in the family Apiaceae known by the common name Howell's yampah. It is native to the mountains of Oregon and northern California, where it grows in moist soils, often near streams and rivers. It is a perennial herb which may exceed 1.5 metres in maximum height, its slender, erect stem growing from a cluster of many narrow fibrous roots measuring up to 15 centimetres long. Leaves near the base of the plant have lance-shaped blades up to half a metre long which are divided into many leaflets made up of toothed, oval segments. Leaves higher on the plant are similar, but generally smaller. The inflorescence is a compound umbel of many spherical clusters of small white flowers. These yield ribbed, oblong-shaped fruits each about half a centimetre long.
