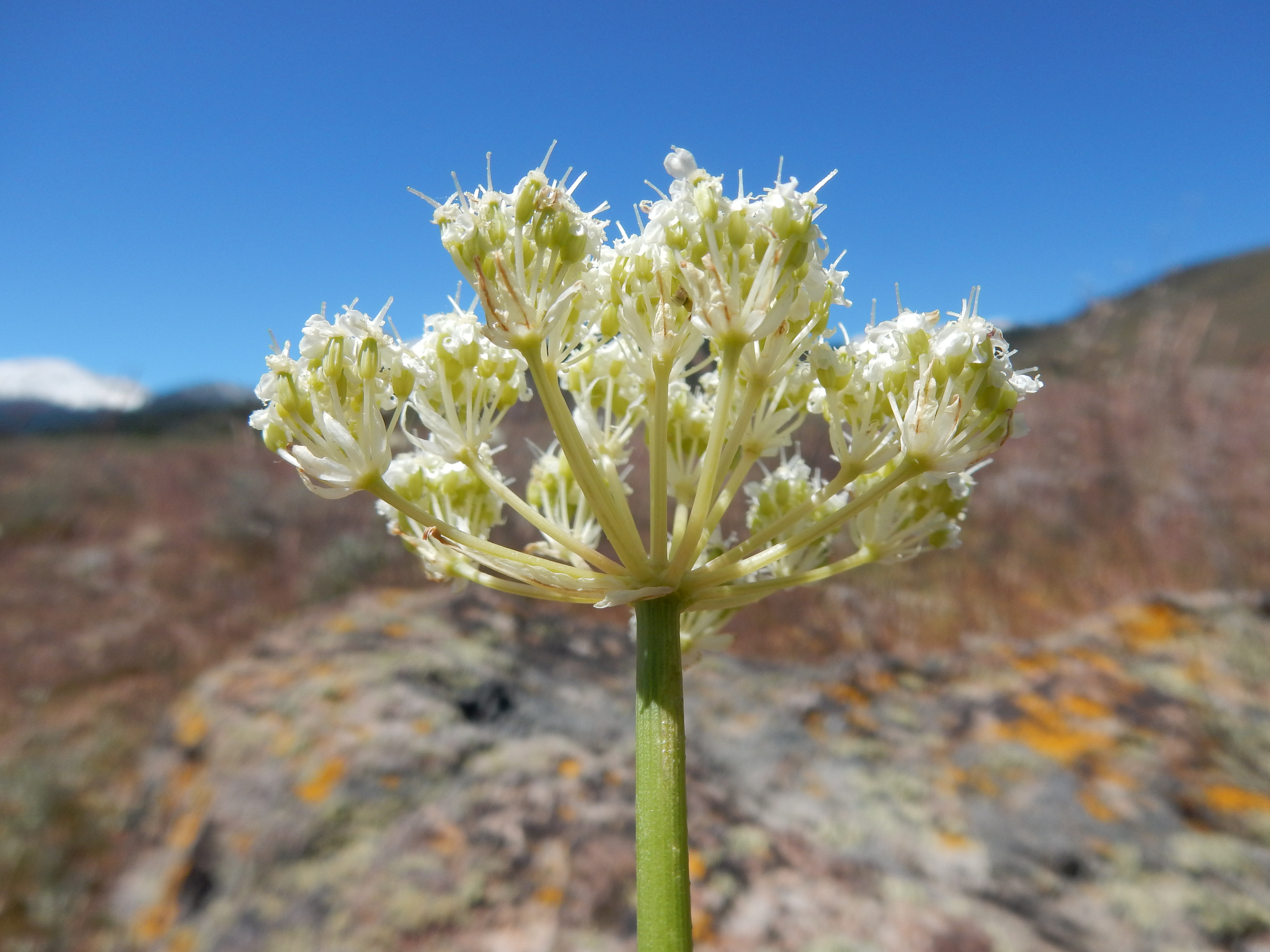

Scientific classification
- Kingdom: Plantae
- Clade: Tracheophytes
- Clade: Angiosperms
- Clade: Eudicots
- Clade: Asterids
- Order: Apiales
- Family: Apiaceae
- Genus: Perideridia
- Species: P. bolanderi

Binomial name
- Perideridia bolanderi (A.Gray) A.Nelson & J.F.Macbr.

= Perideridia bolanderi =

Species of flowering plant

Perideridia bolanderi is a species of flowering plant in the family Apiaceae known by the common name Bolander's yampah. It is native to the western United States, where it grows in many types of habitat. It is a perennial herb which may approach one meter in maximum height, its slender, erect stem growing from tubers measuring up to 7 centimeters long. Leaves near the base of the plant have blades up to 20 centimeters long which are divided into many subdivided lobes of various sizes and shapes; the terminal segments are usually lined with teeth. Leaves higher on the plant are smaller and less divided. The inflorescence is a compound umbel of many spherical clusters of small white flowers. These yield ribbed, oblong-shaped fruits about half a centimeter long. The Atsugewi and Miwok of California used the tuberous roots of this plant for food.
