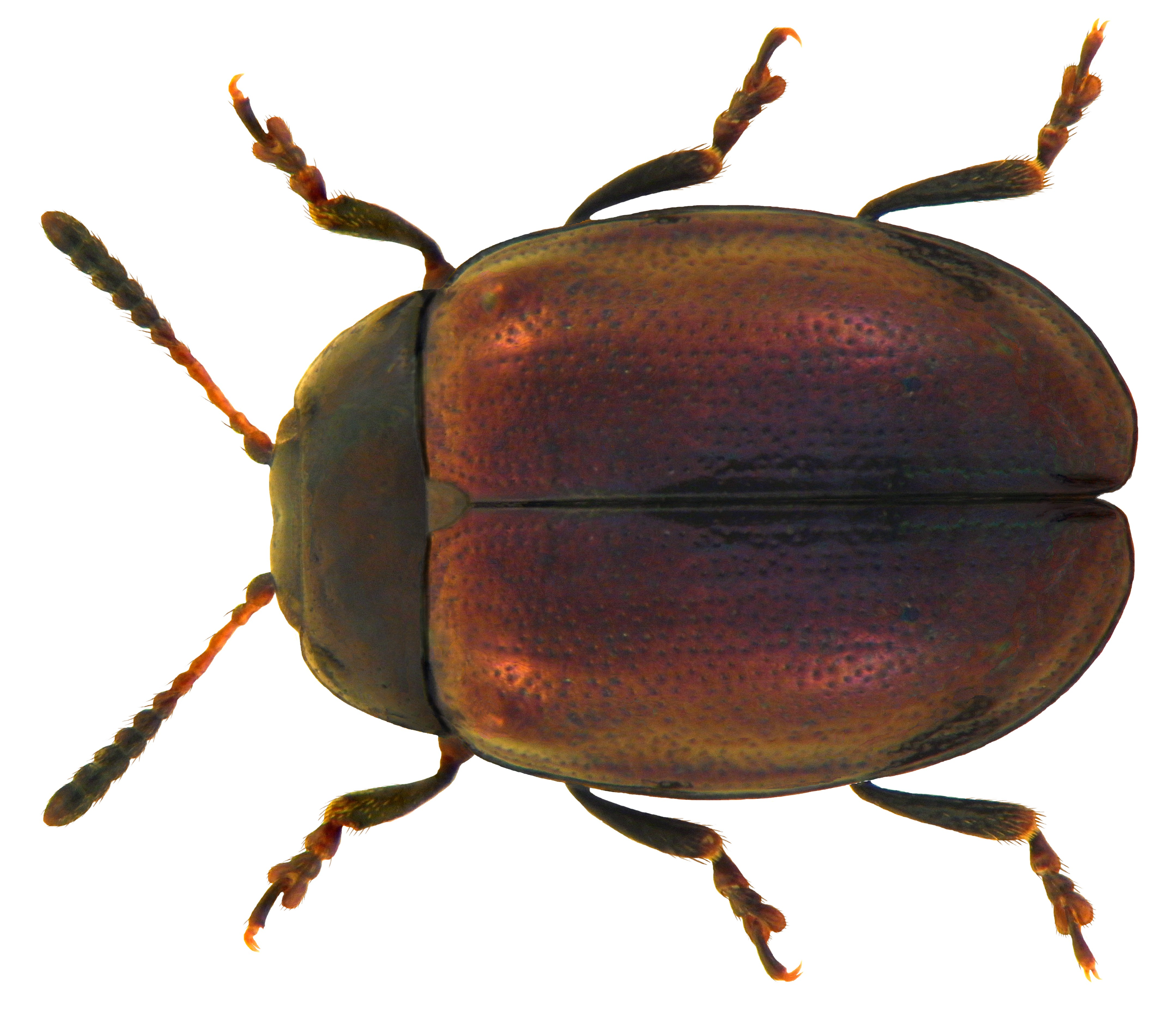
- Plagiodera versicolora

Scientific classification
- Kingdom: Animalia
- Phylum: Arthropoda
- Clade: Pancrustacea
- Class: Insecta
- Order: Coleoptera
- Suborder: Polyphaga
- Infraorder: Cucujiformia
- Superfamily: Chrysomeloidea
- Family: Chrysomelidae
- Subfamily: Chrysomelinae
- Tribe: Chrysomelini
- Genus: Plagiodera; Chevrolat in Dejean, 1836

Synonyms
- Pseudoparopsis Blackburn, 1899

= Plagiodera =

Genus of beetles

Plagiodera is a genus of Chrysomelinae (a subfamily of leaf beetles).

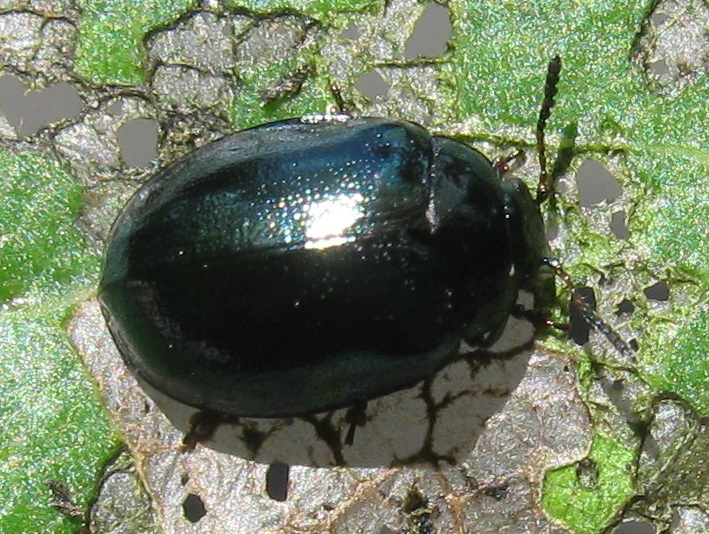
Plagiodera versicolora

== Selected species ==
- Plagiodera arizonae Crotch, 1873^{i c g b}
- Plagiodera cajennensis Fabricius, 1798^{g}
- Plagiodera californica (Rogers, 1856)^{i c g b}
- Plagiodera septemvittata Stal, 1858^{g}
- Plagiodera thymaloides Stål, 1860^{i c g b}
- Plagiodera versicolora (Laicharting, 1781)^{i c g b} (imported willow leaf beetle)

Data sources: i = ITIS, c = Catalogue of Life, g = GBIF, b = Bugguide.net
