= Perideridia lemmonii =

Conservation status
- Apparently Secure (NatureServe)

Scientific classification
- Kingdom: Plantae
- Clade: Tracheophytes
- Clade: Angiosperms
- Clade: Eudicots
- Clade: Asterids
- Order: Apiales
- Family: Apiaceae
- Genus: Perideridia
- Species: P. lemmonii

Binomial name
- Perideridia lemmonii (J.M.Coult. & Rose) T.I.Chuang & Constance

Species of flowering plant

Perideridia lemmonii is a species of flowering plant in the family Apiaceae known by the common names Lemmon's yampah and tuni. It is native to the western United States, where it is known from southeastern Oregon, western Nevada, and the mountains of eastern California. It grows in meadows, forests, and other habitat. It is a perennial herb approaching one meter in maximum height, its slender, erect stem growing from usually a single small tuber about 1.5 centimeters long. Leaves near the base of the plant have blades up to 30 centimeters long divided into one or two pairs of leaflets, each of which may be subdivided. The inflorescence is a compound umbel of many spherical clusters of small white flowers. These yield ribbed, round or oblong-shaped fruits, each under half a centimeter long.
