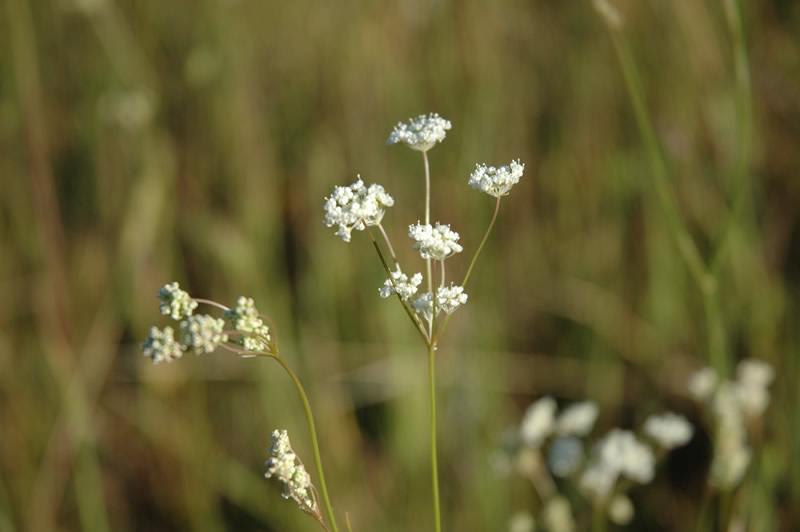

Conservation status
- Critically Imperiled (NatureServe)

Scientific classification
- Kingdom: Plantae
- Clade: Tracheophytes
- Clade: Angiosperms
- Clade: Eudicots
- Clade: Asterids
- Order: Apiales
- Family: Apiaceae
- Genus: Perideridia
- Species: P. erythrorhiza

Binomial name
- Perideridia erythrorhiza (Piper) T.I.Chuang & Constance

= Perideridia erythrorhiza =

Species of flowering plant

Perideridia erythrorhiza is a rare species of flowering plant in the family Apiaceae known by the common names western yampah and redroot yampah. It is endemic to Oregon in the United States, where there are about 20 occurrences. The populations occur in three regions in southwestern Oregon, which are separated by more than 50 miles (80 km). The three separate groups are in the Klamath Mountains and on either side of the Cascade Range.

This plant is a perennial herb growing up to 1.2 meters (3 ft 11 in) in height. The roots are pink to reddish brown in color. The inflorescence is an umbel of tiny white flowers. Blooming occurs in July through September.

This species grows on valley floors in heavy clay soils. The habitat is prairie, pasture, and the edges of woodlands. Other plants in the habitat may include tufted hairgrass (Deschampsia cespitosa) and California oatgrass (Danthonia californica).

Threats to this rare species include housing development, agriculture and grazing, herbicides, introduced species, and nickel mining.

It has been proposed that one of the three groups of populations may represent a separate species.
