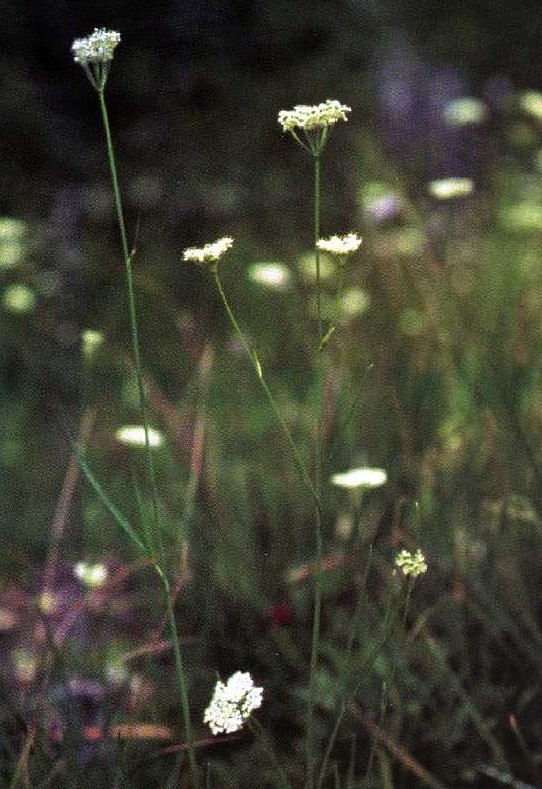

Conservation status
- Apparently Secure (NatureServe)

Scientific classification
- Kingdom: Plantae
- Clade: Tracheophytes
- Clade: Angiosperms
- Clade: Eudicots
- Clade: Asterids
- Order: Apiales
- Family: Apiaceae
- Genus: Perideridia
- Species: P. parishii

Binomial name
- Perideridia parishii (J.M.Coult. & Rose) A.Nelson & J.F.Macbr.

= Perideridia parishii =

Species of flowering plant

Perideridia parishii is a species of flowering plant in the family Apiaceae known by the common name Parish's yampah. It is native to mountainous regions of the southwestern United States, where it grows in forests and other habitat. It is a perennial herb growing up to 90 centimeters tall, its slender green stem growing from a small tuber. Leaves near the base of the plant have blades 10 to 20 centimeters long divided into pairs of leaflets, which may be subdivided or lobed. The inflorescence is a compound umbel of many spherical clusters of small white flowers. These yield ribbed, round or oblong-shaped fruits each about half a centimeter long.
