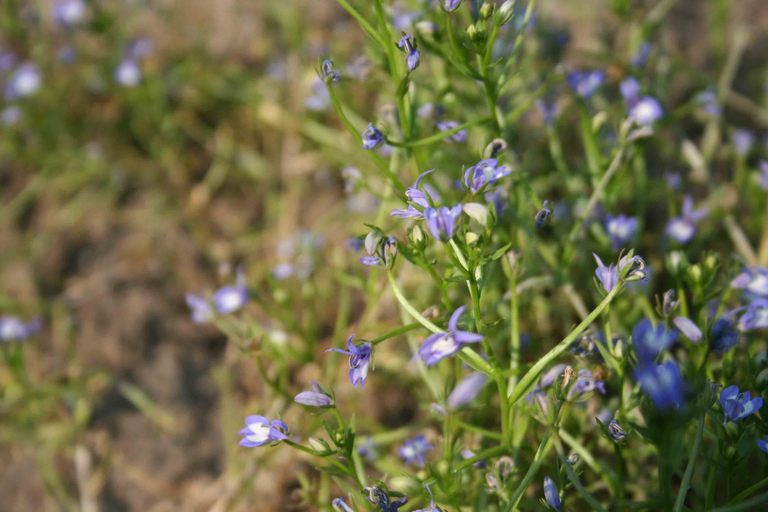

Scientific classification
- Kingdom: Plantae
- Clade: Tracheophytes
- Clade: Angiosperms
- Clade: Eudicots
- Clade: Asterids
- Order: Asterales
- Family: Campanulaceae
- Genus: Downingia
- Species: D. elegans

Binomial name
- Downingia elegans (Dougl. ex Lindl.) Torr.

Synonyms
- Bolelia elegans (Torr.) Greene; Clintonia corymbosa A.DC.; Clintonia elegans Douglas ex Lindl.

= Downingia elegans =

Species of flowering plant

Downingia elegans is a species of flowering plants in the bellflower family known by the common names elegant calicoflower and Californian lobelia. This showy wildflower is native to western North America from California to British Columbia, where it is a resident of meadows and vernal pool ecosystems. This annual grows on a branching erect stem with many pointed leaves. At the top of each stem branch is one or more flowers, each one half to two centimeters wide. The tubular flower has two long, narrow, pointed upper lobes which are generally rich purple. The lower lip is fused into one three-lobed surface, which is purple with a large blotch of white in the center. The lobes may be quite pointed. There is sometimes some yellow coloration near the mouth of the tube.
