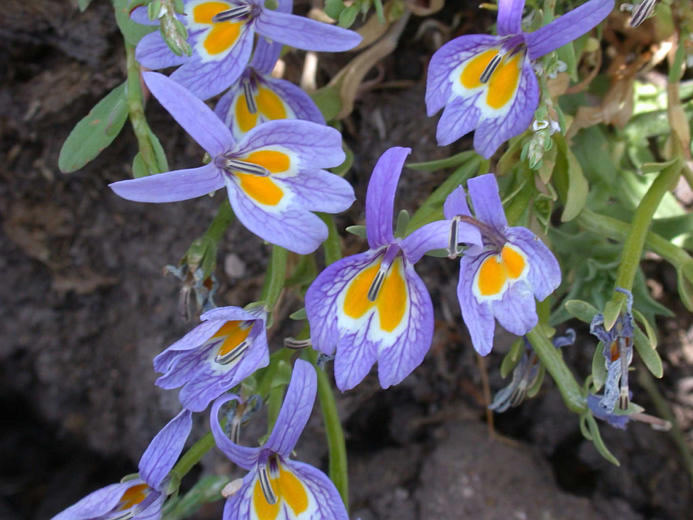

Scientific classification
- Kingdom: Plantae
- Clade: Tracheophytes
- Clade: Angiosperms
- Clade: Eudicots
- Clade: Asterids
- Order: Asterales
- Family: Campanulaceae
- Genus: Downingia
- Species: D. bacigalupii

Binomial name
- Downingia bacigalupii Weiler

= Downingia bacigalupii =

Species of flowering plant

Downingia bacigalupii is a species of flowering plant in the bellflower family (Campanulaceae) known by the common name Bach's calicoflower or Bacigalupi's downingia. This showy wildflower is native to the western United States from California to Idaho, where it is a resident of moist meadows and vernal pool ecosystems. This annual grows on a branching erect stem with small diamond-shaped leaves at intervals. At the top of each stem branch is one or more flowers, each between one and two centimeters wide. The flower has two long upper lobes which may be flat and straight or curl back, and are usually dark-veined blue. The three lower lobes are fused into one three-toothed surface, which is dark-veined blue with two bright yellow blotches rimmed with white in the center. The fruit is a dehiscent capsule two to five centimeters long. The stamens are fused together into an erect purple stalk bearing the dark anthers.

The plant's Latin and common names are for Rimo Bacigalupi, who was known as "Bach."
