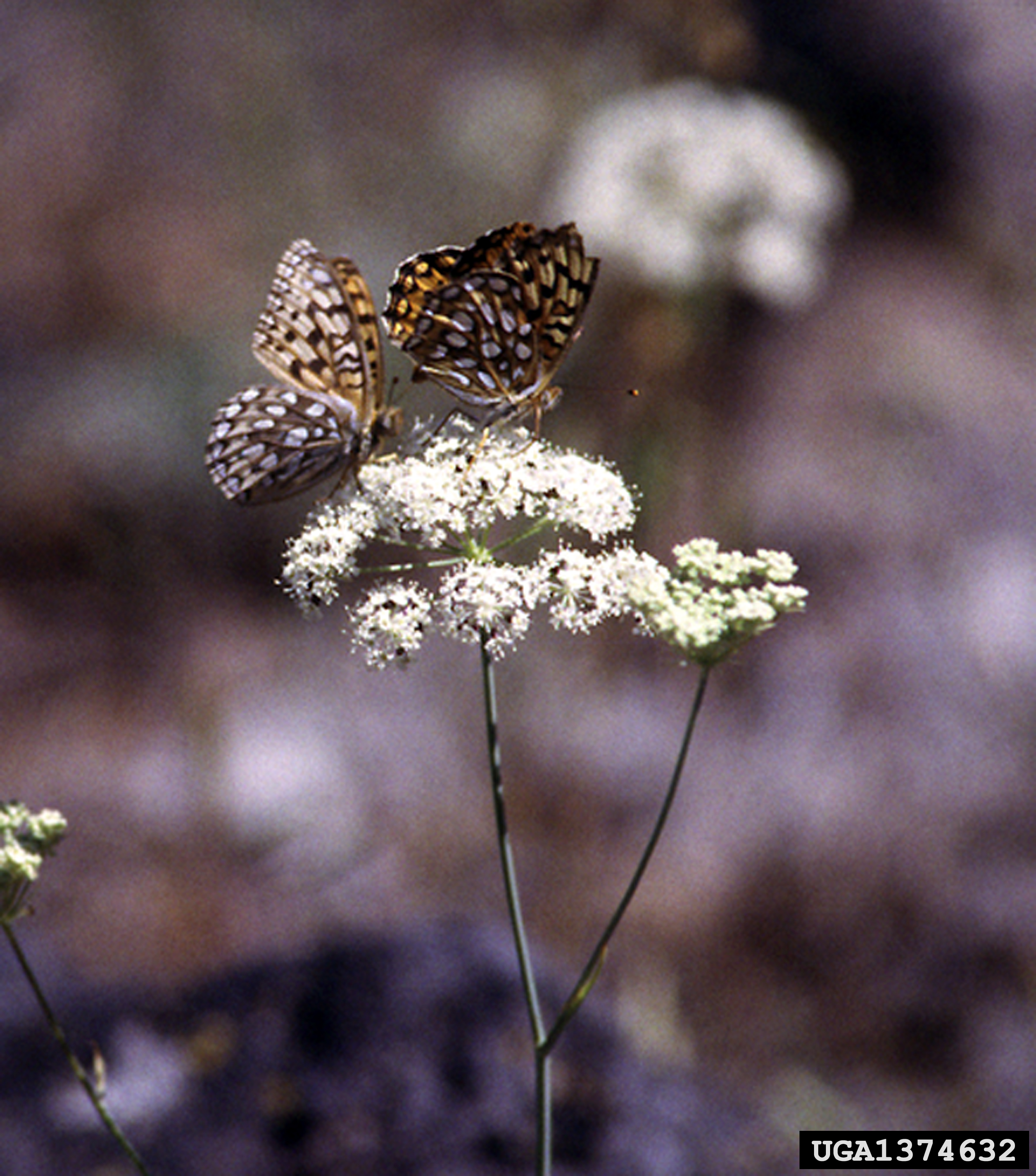

Conservation status
- Apparently Secure (NatureServe)

Scientific classification
- Kingdom: Plantae
- Clade: Tracheophytes
- Clade: Angiosperms
- Clade: Eudicots
- Clade: Asterids
- Order: Apiales
- Family: Apiaceae
- Genus: Perideridia
- Species: P. oregana

Binomial name
- Perideridia oregana (S.Watson) Mathias

= Perideridia oregana =

Species of flowering plant

Eppaw, raw
Nutritional value per 100 g (3.5 oz)
- Energy: 628 kJ (150 kcal)
- Carbohydrates: 31.68 g
- Fat: 1.8 g
- Protein: 4.6 g
Vitamins and minerals
Vitamins	Quantity %DV^{†}
Thiamine (B1)	9% 0.11 mg
Riboflavin (B2)	9% 0.12 mg
Niacin (B3)	2% 0.3 mg
Pantothenic acid (B5)	23% 1.172 mg
Vitamin B6	10% 0.176 mg
Folate (B9)	6% 24 μg
Vitamin C	14% 13 mg
Minerals	Quantity %DV^{†}
Calcium	8% 110 mg
Iron	6% 1.15 mg
Magnesium	8% 32 mg
Manganese	48% 1.094 mg
Phosphorus	13% 165 mg
Potassium	11% 340 mg
Zinc	10% 1.15 mg
- Link to USDA Database entry
- ^{†}Percentages estimated using US recommendations for adults, except for potassium, which is estimated based on expert recommendation from the National Academies

Perideridia oregana is a species of flowering plant in the family Apiaceae known by the common names Oregon yampah and eppaw. It is native to Oregon and California in the western United States, where it grows in woodland and other habitat. This plant is quite variable in appearance. In general, it is a perennial herb 10 to 90 centimeters tall, its green to waxy-grayish erect stem growing from a cluster of small tubers. Leaves near the base of the plant have blades 3 to 30 centimeters long divided into a variable number of leaflets, which may be subdivided into smaller segments. The inflorescence is a compound umbel of many spherical clusters of small white flowers. These yield ribbed, oblong-shaped fruits 3 to 6 millimeters long.
