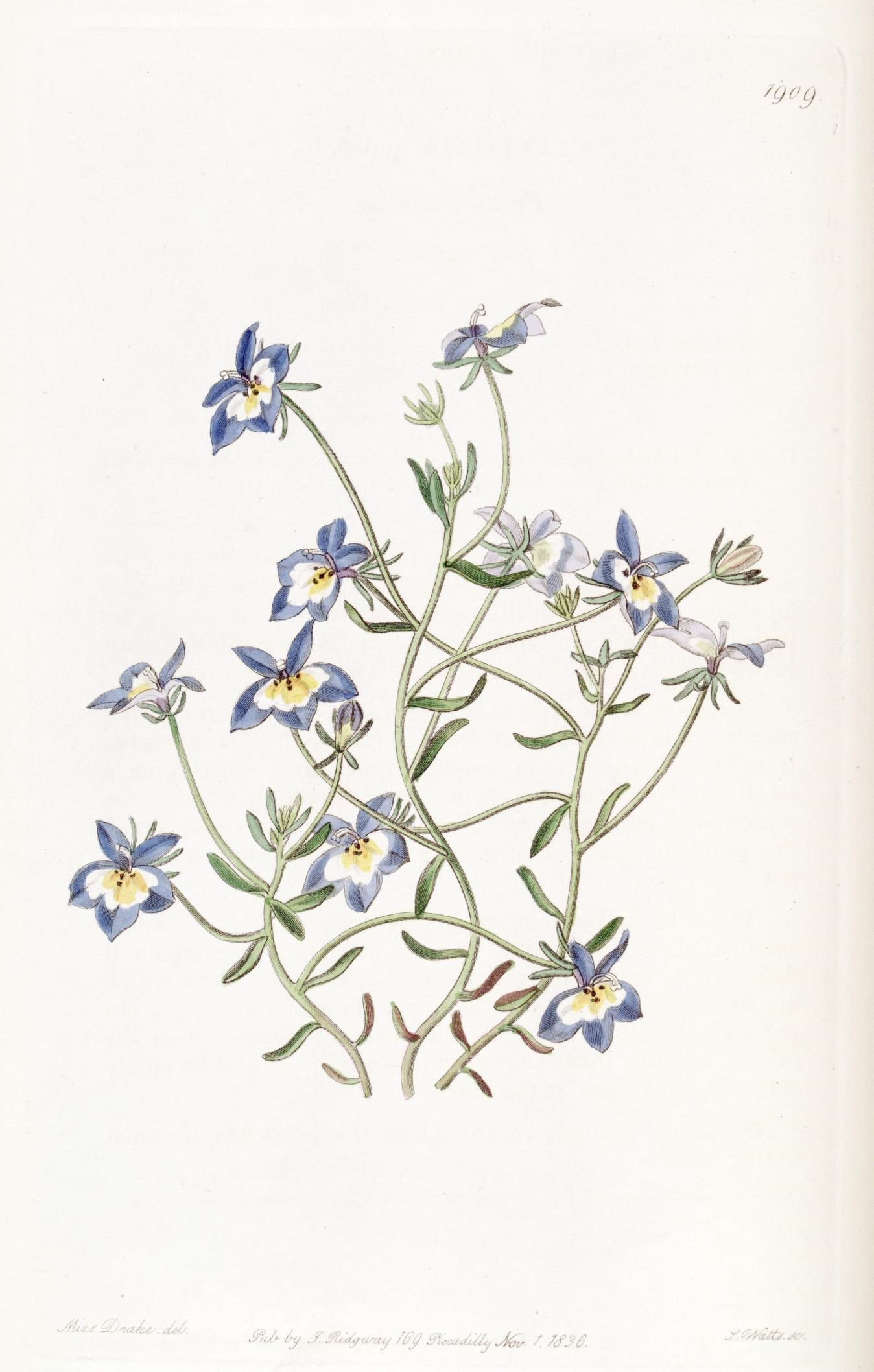
- Illustration by Sarah Drake

Scientific classification
- Kingdom: Plantae
- Clade: Tracheophytes
- Clade: Angiosperms
- Clade: Eudicots
- Clade: Asterids
- Order: Asterales
- Family: Campanulaceae
- Genus: Downingia
- Species: D. pulchella

Binomial name
- Downingia pulchella (Lindl.) Torr.

= Downingia pulchella =

Species of flowering plant

Downingia pulchella is a species of flowering plant in the bellflower family known by the common names flatface calicoflower and valley calicoflower. This showy, annual wildflower is endemic to California, where it is a resident of vernal pools and other wet places in the central part of the state from the Tehachapi Mountains to the San Francisco Bay Area.

== Description ==
It produces an erect, branching stem which has usually one tubular flower at the top of each branch. The upper lip of the flower is made up of two narrow, pointed lobes which usually stick straight out and are lavender or white. The lower lip is the same color and made up of three fused lobes, each of which may have a tooth. In the center of the lower lip is a large white area with two bright yellow spots and smaller dark purple spots near the mouth of the tube. A large anther sticks out of the mouth of the flower on a stalk of fused stamens. The flower is one to two centimeters wide. The fruit is a capsule three to seven centimeters long.
