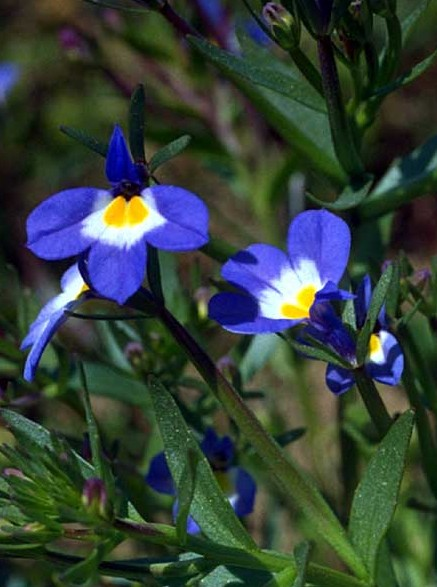

Scientific classification
- Kingdom: Plantae
- Clade: Tracheophytes
- Clade: Angiosperms
- Clade: Eudicots
- Clade: Asterids
- Order: Asterales
- Family: Campanulaceae
- Genus: Downingia
- Species: D. yina

Binomial name
- Downingia yina Applegate

= Downingia yina =

Species of flowering plant

Downingia yina is a distinctive, colorful wildflower known by the common name Cascade calico-flower. It bears small, easily recognizable flowers up to 1 centimeter in width. Each flower has three fused lower petals which are blue or violet with a central spot which is white with a yellow center. This pattern is attractive to pollinating insects and helps them navigate to the flower's center. The two upper blue petals may fold together to face each other, or stick straight out.

This flower grows in moist habitats including vernal pools, wet meadows, and edges of lakes. It can be found in the Pacific Northwest from Washington to northern California.
