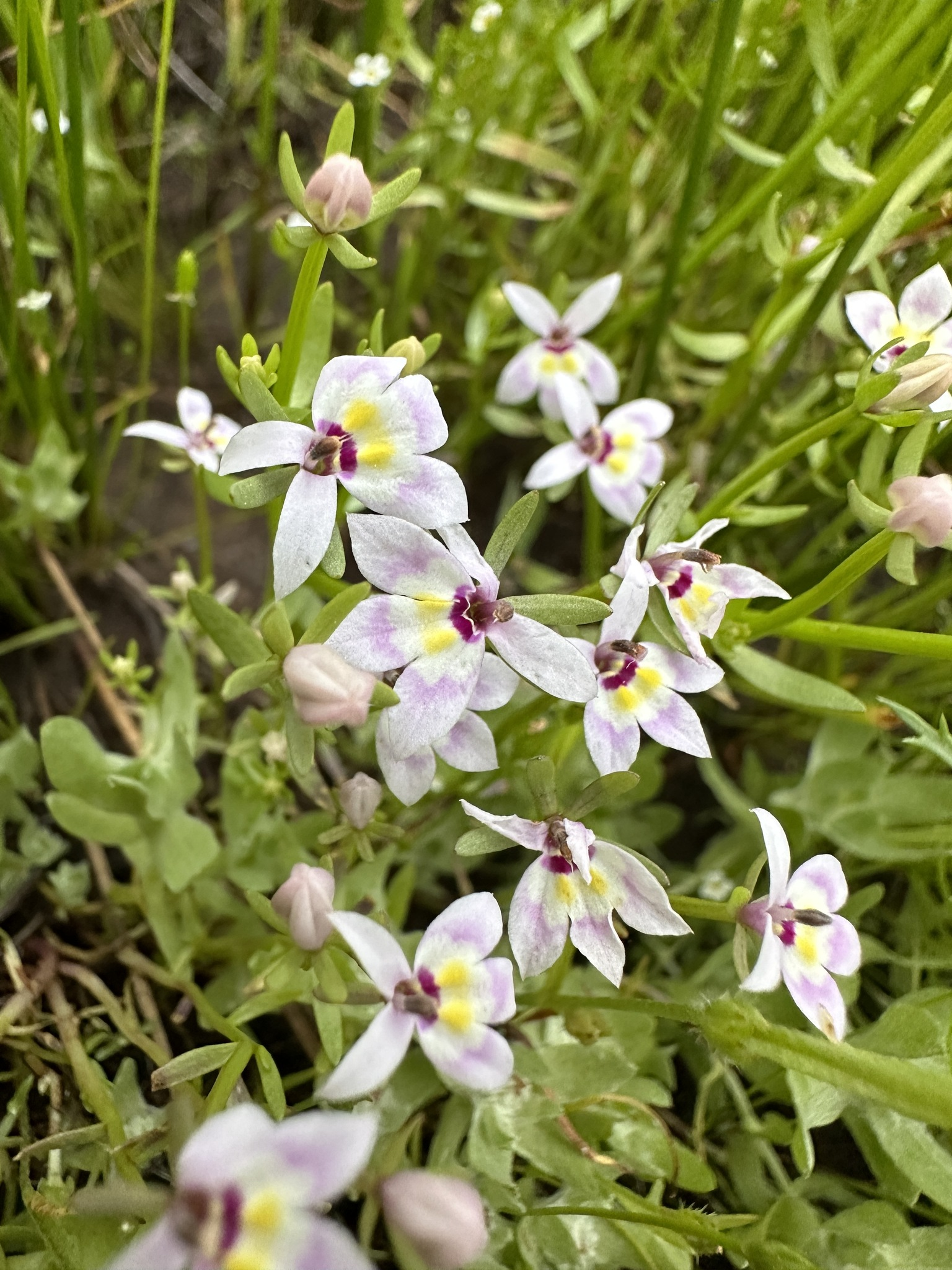

Conservation status
- Secure (NatureServe)

Scientific classification
- Kingdom: Plantae
- Clade: Tracheophytes
- Clade: Angiosperms
- Clade: Eudicots
- Clade: Asterids
- Order: Asterales
- Family: Campanulaceae
- Genus: Downingia
- Species: D. laeta

Binomial name
- Downingia laeta Greene

= Downingia laeta =

Species of flowering plant

Downingia laeta is a species of flowering plant in the bellflower family known by the common name Great Basin calicoflower. This showy wildflower is native to western North America from California to Saskatchewan, where it is a resident of riverbanks, ponds, and vernal pool ecosystems. This annual grows on a thick erect stem with a few short, pointed leaves. Atop the stem is usually a single flower, which has an upper lip made up of two narrow, pointed lobes in shades of very light blue or purple, or white, and a lower lip which is a fusion of three lobes in the same color with two bright yellow spots and sometimes some purple or pink blotches or streaking.
