= Downingia ornatissima =

Conservation status
- Imperiled (NatureServe)

Scientific classification
- Kingdom: Plantae
- Clade: Tracheophytes
- Clade: Angiosperms
- Clade: Eudicots
- Clade: Asterids
- Order: Asterales
- Family: Campanulaceae
- Genus: Downingia
- Species: D. ornatissima

Binomial name
- Downingia ornatissima Greene

Species of flowering plant

Downingia ornatissima is a species of flowering plant in the bellflower family known by the common name folded calicoflower. This showy wildflower is endemic to California, where it is a resident of vernal pools and other wet places in the Central Valley. This annual grows an erect, branching stem with usually one tubular flower at the top of each branch. The flower has an upper lip made up of two narrow, pointed lobes in shades of light purple, and a lower lip made up of three lobes fused into one surface, which is the same color as the upper lip and has a central field of white with two prominent yellow projections. The flower is similar to those of other downingias, except it is lightly crinkled, with the upper lobes often curled back and the edges of the lower lobes uneven. The dark blue anther just emerges from where it is tucked between the upper lobes.
