= Perideridia californica =

Scientific classification
- Kingdom: Plantae
- Clade: Tracheophytes
- Clade: Angiosperms
- Clade: Eudicots
- Clade: Asterids
- Order: Apiales
- Family: Apiaceae
- Genus: Perideridia
- Species: P. californica

Binomial name
- Perideridia californica (Torr.) A.Nelson & J.F.Macbr.

Species of flowering plant

Perideridia californica is a species of flowering plant in the family Apiaceae known by the common name California yampah. It is endemic to California, where it is known from the Central Coast Ranges and a section of the Sierra Nevada foothills. It grows in moist soils, often near streams. It is a perennial herb which may approach 1.5 meters in maximum height, its slender, erect stem growing from cylindrical tubers measuring up to 12 centimeters long. Leaves near the base of the plant have blades up to 40 centimeters long which are divided into many flat, narrow, subdivided lobes. Leaves higher on the plant are smaller and less divided. The inflorescence is a compound umbel of many spherical clusters of small white flowers. These yield ribbed, oblong-shaped fruits under a centimeter long.
