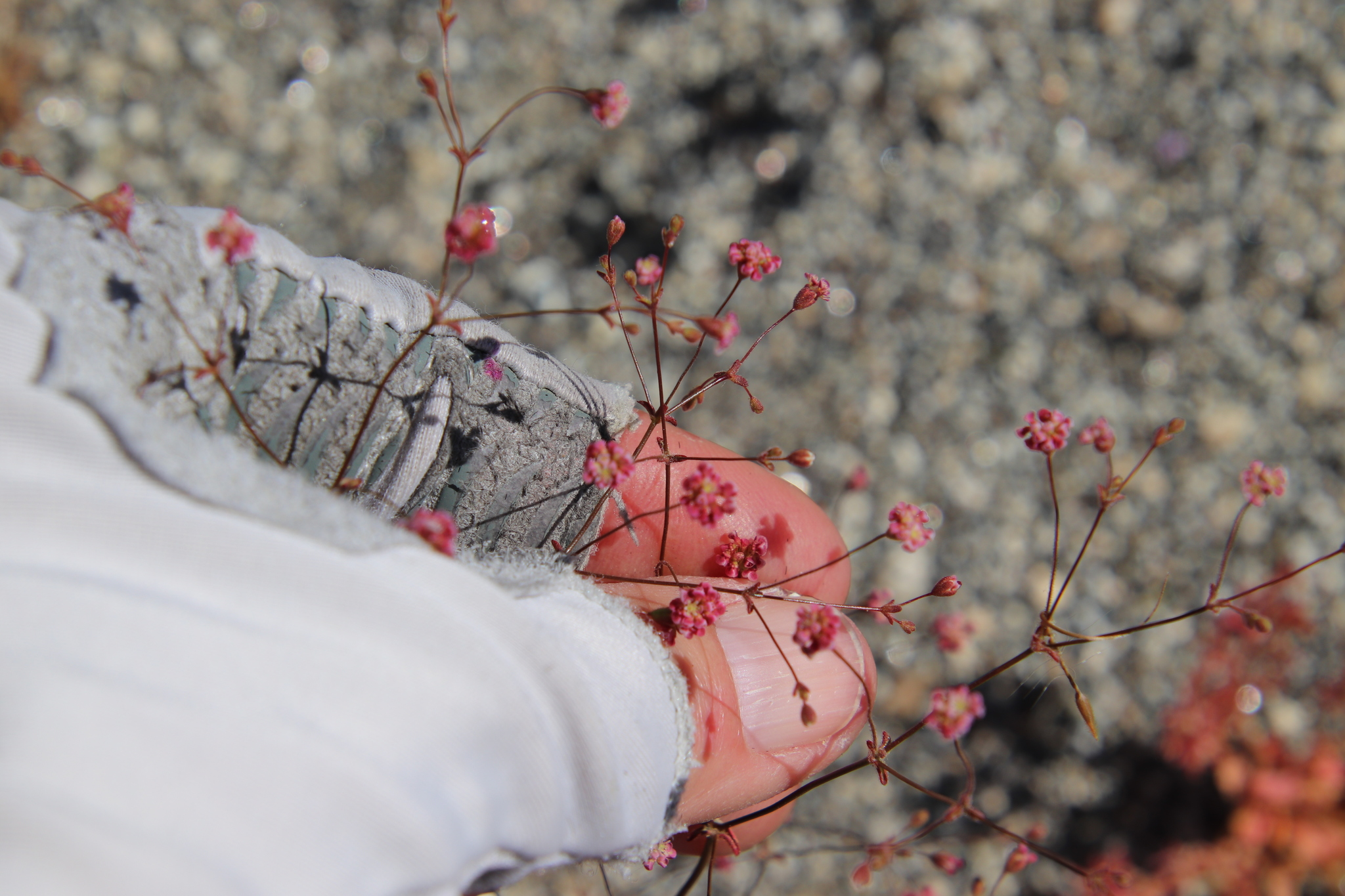

Scientific classification
- Kingdom: Plantae
- Clade: Tracheophytes
- Clade: Angiosperms
- Clade: Eudicots
- Order: Caryophyllales
- Family: Polygonaceae
- Genus: Eriogonum
- Species: E. thurberi

Binomial name
- Eriogonum thurberi Torr.

= Eriogonum thurberi =

Species of wild buckwheat

Eriogonum thomasii is a species of wild buckwheat known by the common name Thurber's buckwheat. It is native to the desert southwest of North America in Arizona, California, New Mexico and three desert states of Mexico, where it is common to abundant in many areas.

== Description ==
It is a thin annual herb growing up to 40 centimeters tall, with a basal rosette of rounded to oval leaves around the stem.

The inflorescence is an open array of stem branches bearing clusters of tiny white to pink flowers.
