= Diplacus rutilus =

Conservation status
- Unranked (NatureServe)

Scientific classification
- Kingdom: Plantae
- Clade: Tracheophytes
- Clade: Angiosperms
- Clade: Eudicots
- Clade: Asterids
- Order: Lamiales
- Family: Phrymaceae
- Genus: Diplacus
- Species: D. rutilus

Binomial name
- Diplacus rutilus (A.L.Grant) McMinn

Synonyms
- Diplacus longiflorus var. rutilus (A.L.Grant) McMinn; Mimulus longiflorus var. rutilus A.L.Grant

Species of flowering plant

Diplacus rutilus, the Santa Susana bush-monkeyflower, is a species of flowering plant. It is a subshrub or shrub native to south-central and southwestern California. It is known from the foothills of the Transverse Ranges in Los Angeles, Riverside, and Ventura counties.

The taxon was first described as Mimulus longiflorus var. rutilus by Adele L. Grant in 1925. In 1939 Howard Earnest McMinn placed it in genus Diplacus as D. longiflorus var. rutilus, and in 1951 McMinn raised it to a full species as D. rutilus. As of September 2026 the Jepson eFlora treats it as a synonym of Diplacus longiflorus.
