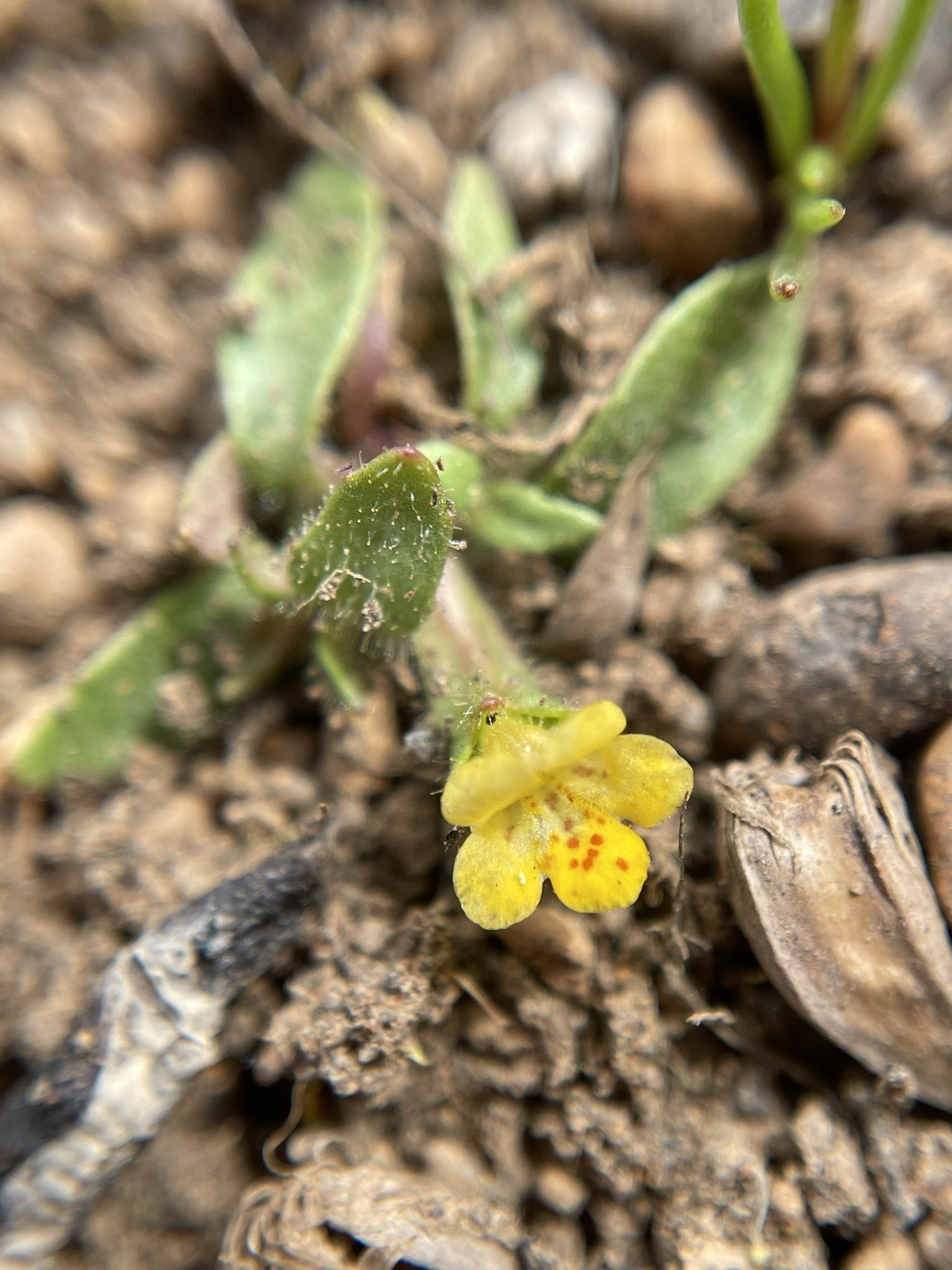
- Lassen National Forest, California, 2022

Conservation status
- Apparently Secure (NatureServe)

Scientific classification
- Kingdom: Plantae
- Clade: Embryophytes
- Clade: Tracheophytes
- Clade: Angiosperms
- Clade: Eudicots
- Clade: Asterids
- Order: Lamiales
- Family: Phrymaceae
- Genus: Diplacus
- Species: D. pygmaeus

Binomial name
- Diplacus pygmaeus (A.L.Grant) G.L.Nesom

Synonyms
- Mimulus minutissimus Eastw.; Mimulus pygmaeus A.L.Grant

= Diplacus pygmaeus =

Species of flowering plant

Diplacus pygmaeus is a species of monkeyflower (Family Phrymaceae) known by the common name Egg Lake monkeyflower.

== Distribution and habitat ==
It is native to northeastern California and adjacent sections of Oregon, where it grows in sagebrush and wet, open habitat in scrub, forest, and woodland. Once thought to be extremely rare and vulnerable, the plant is actually locally common in areas where the soil has been recently disturbed, allowing a probably large seed bank to germinate.

Despite its annual population sometimes running into the millions, the plant is threatened when large-scale disturbances occur.

== Description ==
This is a petite annual herb forming dense tufts often just a few millimeters high. The lightly hairy oval or widely lance-shaped leaves are up to 1.5 centimeters long. The yellow flower is no more than a centimeter long, its tubular base encapsulated in a hairy calyx of sepals.
