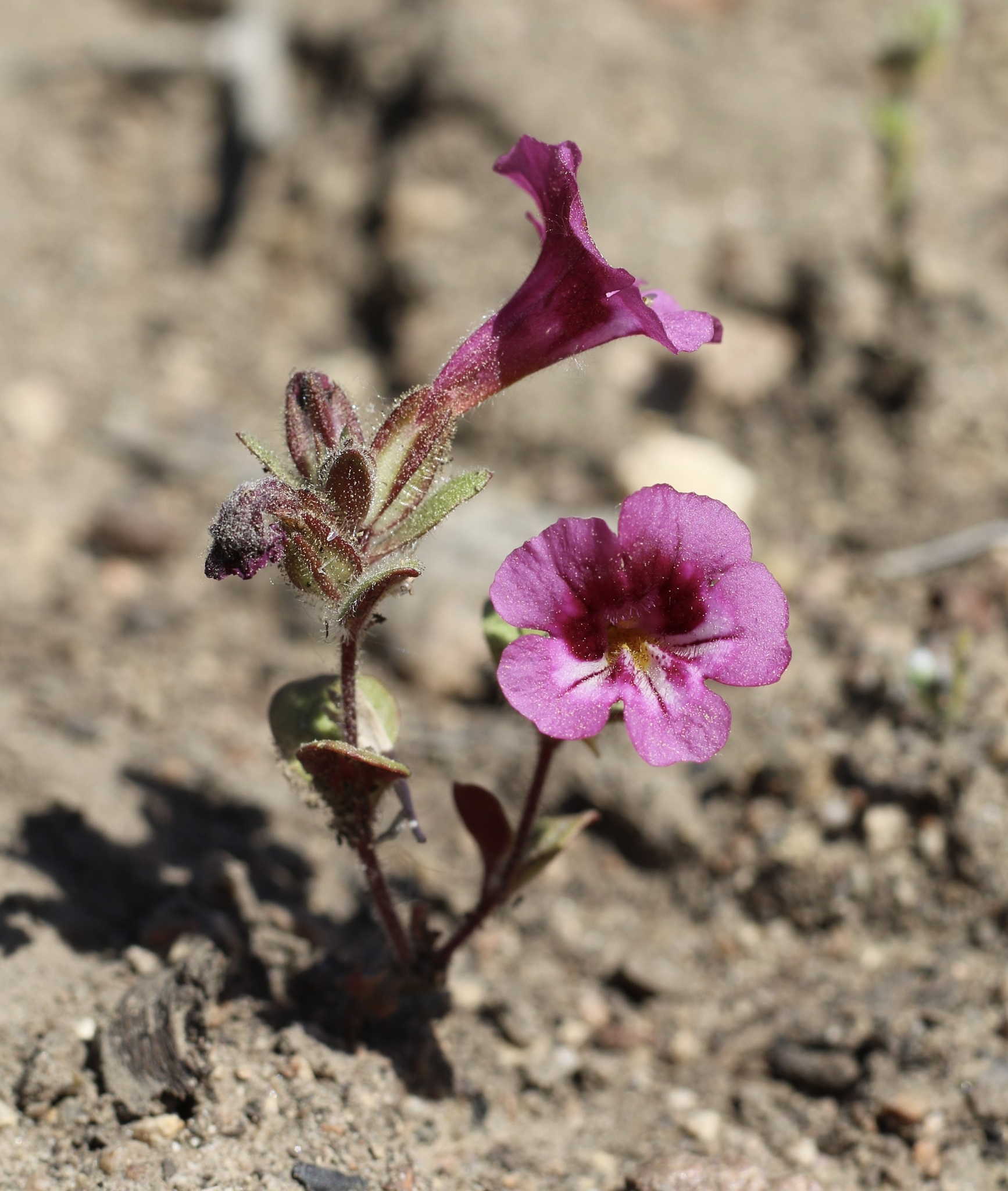
- Ventura County, 2023

Conservation status
- Vulnerable (NatureServe)

Scientific classification
- Kingdom: Plantae
- Clade: Embryophytes
- Clade: Tracheophytes
- Clade: Angiosperms
- Clade: Eudicots
- Clade: Asterids
- Order: Lamiales
- Family: Phrymaceae
- Genus: Diplacus
- Species: D. constrictus

Binomial name
- Diplacus constrictus (A.L.Grant) G.L.Nesom

Synonyms
- Mimulus constrictus (A.L.Grant) Pennell; Mimulus subsecundus var. constrictus A.L.Grant; Mimulus viscidus subsp. constrictus (A.L.Grant) Munz

= Diplacus constrictus =

Species of plant

Diplacus constrictus, the viscid monkeyflower or dense-fruited monkeyflower, is a species of annual flowering plant in the Phrymaceae family. It is native and entirely endemic to central and southern California. It is known from the southern Sierra Nevada, the Tehachapi Mountains, and the western Transverse Ranges from 790 to 2090 (2380) meters elevation, where it is typically found on slopes and road banks in runoff areas.
