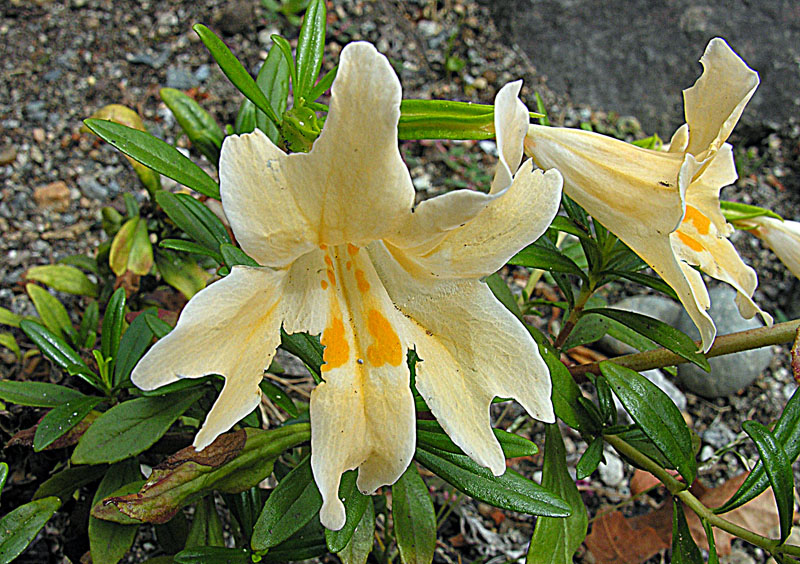

Conservation status
- Vulnerable (NatureServe)

Scientific classification
- Kingdom: Plantae
- Clade: Embryophytes
- Clade: Tracheophytes
- Clade: Angiosperms
- Clade: Eudicots
- Clade: Asterids
- Order: Lamiales
- Family: Phrymaceae
- Genus: Diplacus
- Species: D. grandiflorus

Binomial name
- Diplacus grandiflorus (Lindl. & Paxton) Hérincq

Synonyms
- Diplacus aurantiacus var. grandiflorus (Lindl. & Paxton) D.J.Keil; Diplacus glutinosus var. grandiflorus Lindl. & Paxton; Mimulus aurantiacus var. grandiflorus (Lindl. & Paxton) D.M.Thomps.; Mimulus bifidus Pennell

= Diplacus grandiflorus =

Species of flowering plant

Diplacus grandiflorus, the large-flowered bush-monkeyflower, is a species of flowering plant. It is a subshrub or shrub endemic to the northern Sierra Nevada of California. It grows on steep canyon banks and rocky hillsides from 90 to 1530 (1830) meters elevation.

The taxon was first described as Diplacus glutinosus var. grandiflorus by John Lindley and Joseph Paxton in 1852. In 1854 François Hérincq elevated it to a full species as D. grandiflorus. D. grandiflorus Greene is a later homonym which is now considered a synonym of D. aurantiacus.
