= Diplacus traskiae =

Conservation status
- Presumed Extinct (NatureServe)

Scientific classification
- Kingdom: Plantae
- Clade: Tracheophytes
- Clade: Angiosperms
- Clade: Eudicots
- Clade: Asterids
- Order: Lamiales
- Family: Phrymaceae
- Genus: Diplacus
- Species: D. traskiae

Binomial name
- Diplacus traskiae (A.L.Grant ex Millsp. & L.Nutt.) G.L.Nesom

Synonyms
- Mimulus traskiae A.L.Grant ex Millsp. & L.Nutt.

Species of flowering plant

Mimulus traskiae, commonly known as Santa Catalina Island monkeyflower, is a species of flowering plant in the family Phrymaceae. It is an annual endemic to southeastern Santa Catalina Island in California. It is known only from the type collection, made in 1901 and 1904, and has not been collected since. It is likely that the species was driven to extinction by grazing of introduced cattle.
