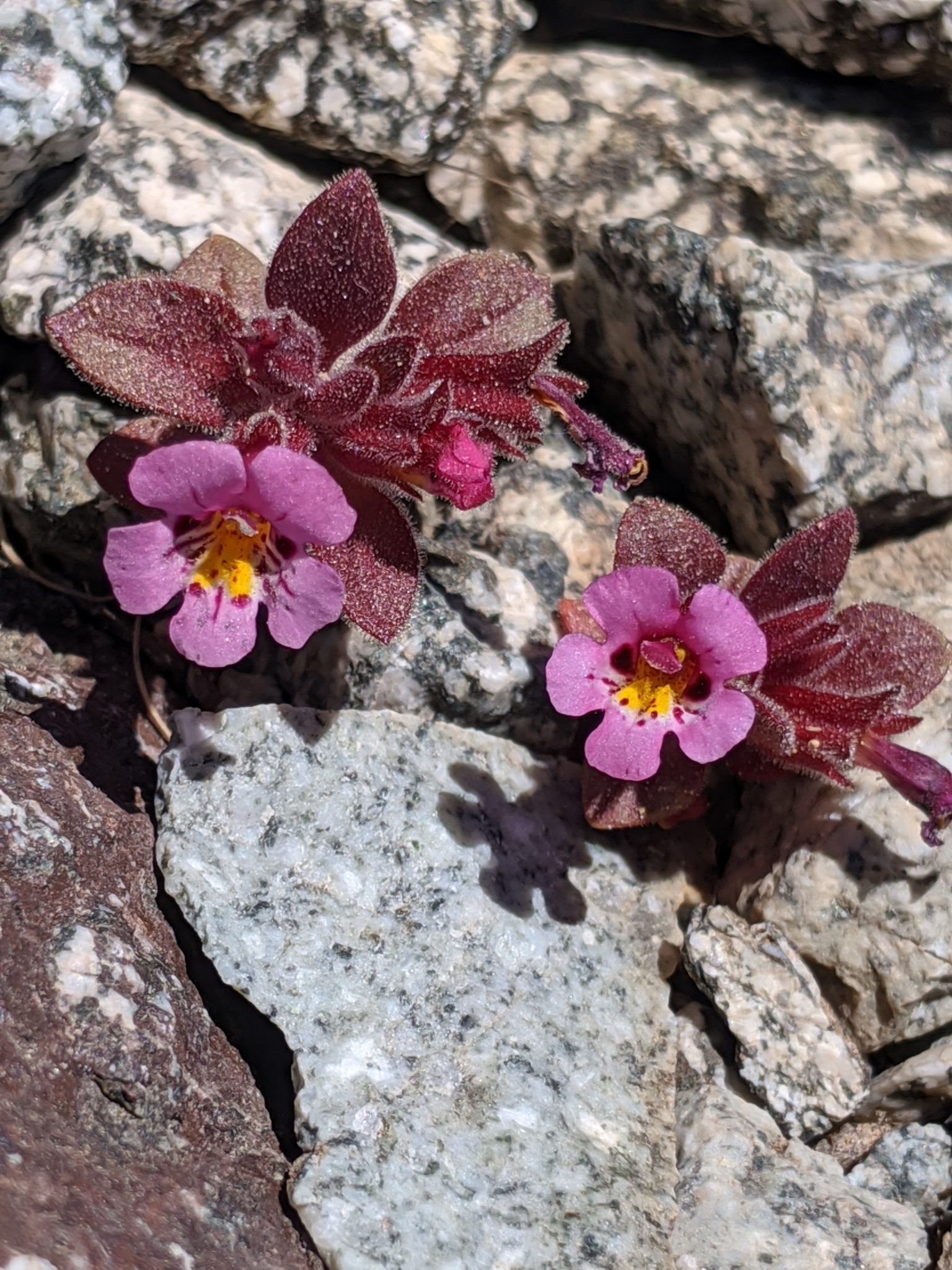
- San Bernardino County, 2020

Conservation status
- Apparently Secure (NatureServe)

Scientific classification
- Kingdom: Plantae
- Clade: Embryophytes
- Clade: Tracheophytes
- Clade: Angiosperms
- Clade: Eudicots
- Clade: Asterids
- Order: Lamiales
- Family: Phrymaceae
- Genus: Diplacus
- Species: D. johnstonii

Binomial name
- Diplacus johnstonii (A.L.Grant) G.L.Nesom

Synonyms
- Mimulus johnstonii A.L.Grant

= Diplacus johnstonii =

Species of flowering plant

Diplacus johnstonii is a species of monkeyflower known by the common name Johnston's monkeyflower.

== Distribution ==
It is endemic to the Transverse Ranges of southern California, where it is known only from the San Gabriel and San Bernardino Mountains. It grows in rocky and disturbed habitat, such as roadsides and scree.

== Description ==
Diplacus johnstonii is an annual herb producing a thin, hairy stem up to about 20 cm (8 in) tall. The oppositely arranged pointed oval leaves are 1 to 3 cm (0.4 to 1.2 in) in length.

The tubular base of each flower is encapsulated in a reddish, hairy calyx of sepals with spreading, pointed lobes. The flower is dark pink to magenta in color with a yellow spot and usually two purple spots in its throat. It is up to 1.5 centimeters long and has five lobes at its mouth.
