= Sticky monkeyflower =

Sticky monkeyflower is a common name for several plants and may refer to:

- Diplacus aurantiacus
- Diplacus viscidus
