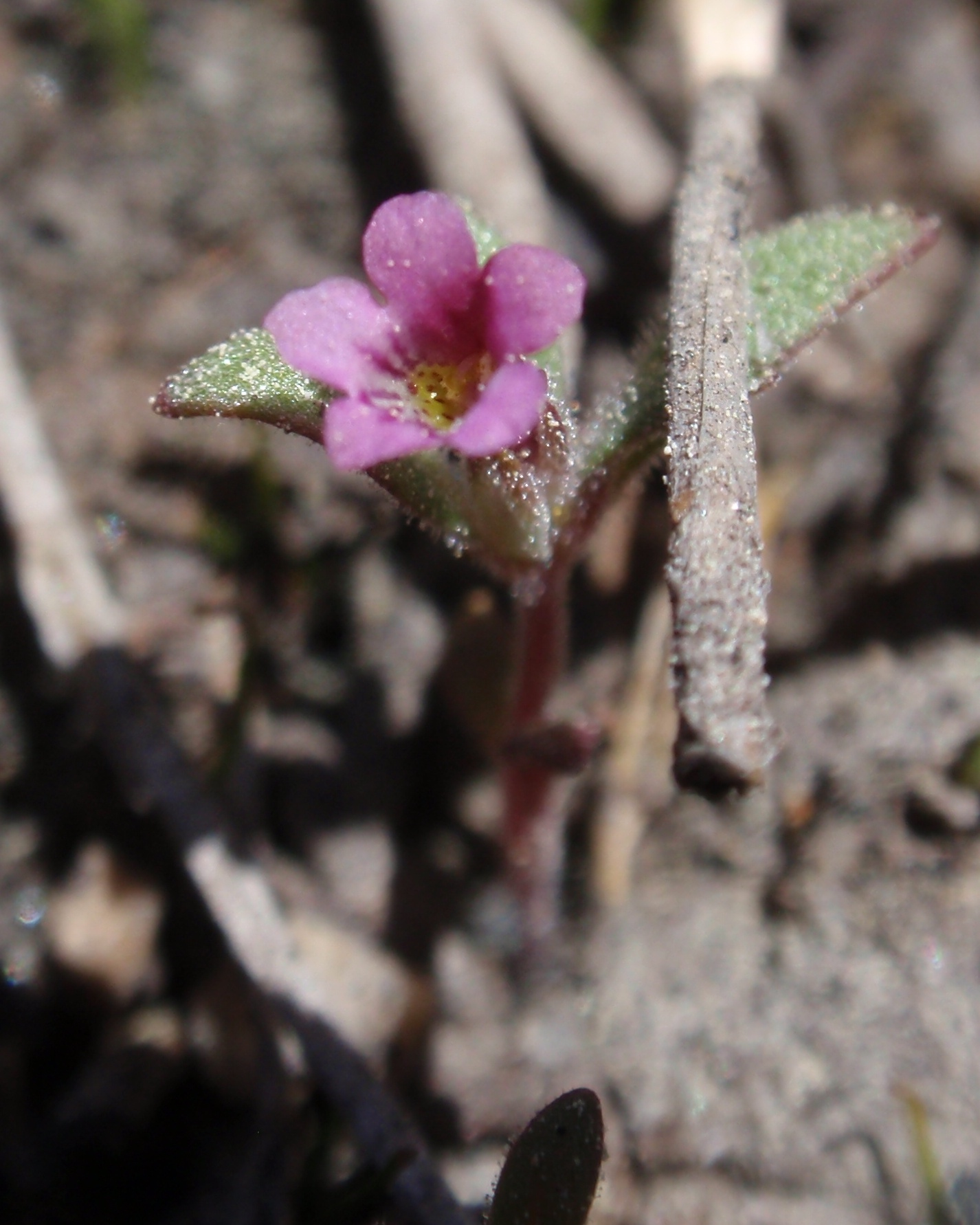

Conservation status
- Apparently Secure (NatureServe)

Scientific classification
- Kingdom: Plantae
- Clade: Embryophytes
- Clade: Tracheophytes
- Clade: Angiosperms
- Clade: Eudicots
- Clade: Asterids
- Order: Lamiales
- Family: Phrymaceae
- Genus: Diplacus
- Species: D. leptaleus

Binomial name
- Diplacus leptaleus (A.Gray) G.L.Nesom

Synonyms
- Eunanus leptaleus (A.Gray) Greene; Mimulus leptaleus A.Gray

= Diplacus leptaleus =

Species of flowering plant

Diplacus leptaleus is a species of monkeyflower known by the common names slender monkeyflower, Sierra monkeyflower, and least-flowered monkeyflower.

== Description ==
Diplacus leptaleus is a small, hairy annual herb growing at ground level or erect to a maximum height near 14 centimeters. The oppositely arranged leaves are linear or lance-shaped and up to 2.5 centimeters in length.

The tubular, wide-faced flower is under a centimeter long and may be magenta, white, or yellow in color, sometimes with dark spotting in the throat.

== Distribution ==
Diplacus leptaleus is endemic to the Sierra Nevada of California and far western Nevada, where it grows in granite soils and sand near rock outcrops and in disturbed areas from 2,000 to 3,400 meters elevation.
