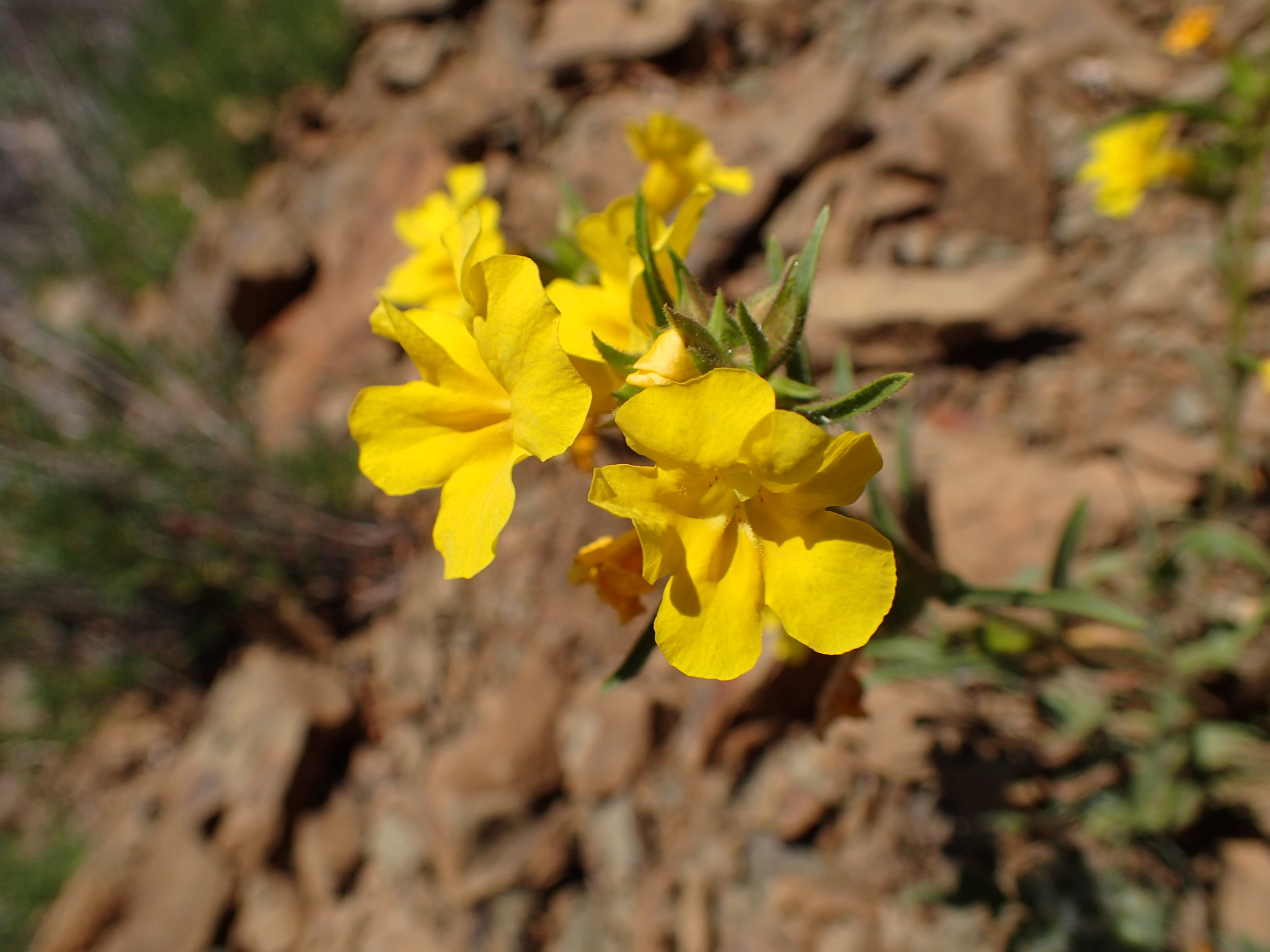

Conservation status
- Apparently Secure (NatureServe)

Scientific classification
- Kingdom: Plantae
- Clade: Embryophytes
- Clade: Tracheophytes
- Clade: Angiosperms
- Clade: Eudicots
- Clade: Asterids
- Order: Lamiales
- Family: Phrymaceae
- Genus: Diplacus
- Species: D. brevipes

Binomial name
- Diplacus brevipes (Benth.) G.L.Nesom

Synonyms
- Eunanus brevipes (Benth.) Greene; Mimulus brevipes Benth.

= Diplacus brevipes =

Species of flowering plant

Diplacus brevipes is a species of monkeyflower known by the common name widethroat yellow monkeyflower. It was formerly known as Mimulus brevipes.

== Distribution ==
It is native to the Transverse and Peninsular Ranges and other mountains and foothills of southern California and Baja California. Diplacus brevipes grows in chaparral, especially open areas such as those recently cleared by wildfire.

== Description ==
Diplacus brevipes is a hairy annual herb producing an erect stem reaching maximum heights anywhere between 5 and 80 centimeters tall. The paired opposite leaves are lance-shaped to oval and are up to 9 centimeters long.

The tubular throat of the flower is encapsulated in a hairy calyx of sepals up to 2.5 centimeters long with pointed tips, some longer than others. The bright yellow flower corolla is up to 3 centimeters long with five lobes at the mouth, two on the upper lip and three on the lower.
