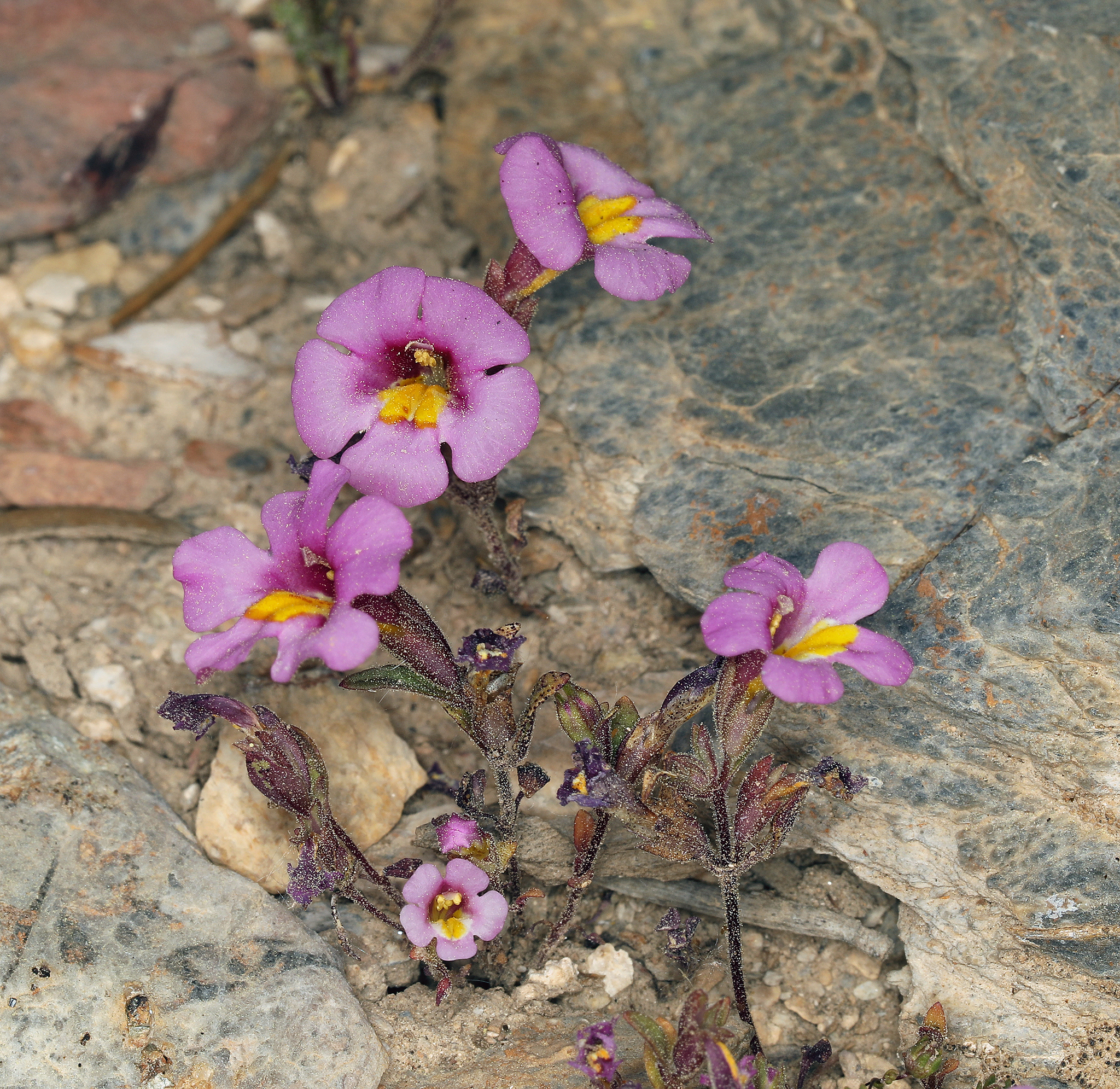
- Inyo County, California, 2023

Conservation status
- Apparently Secure (NatureServe)

Scientific classification
- Kingdom: Plantae
- Clade: Embryophytes
- Clade: Tracheophytes
- Clade: Angiosperms
- Clade: Eudicots
- Clade: Asterids
- Order: Lamiales
- Family: Phrymaceae
- Genus: Diplacus
- Species: D. parryi

Binomial name
- Diplacus parryi (A.Gray) G.L.Nesom & N.S.Fraga

Synonyms
- Eunanus parryi (A.Gray) Greene; Mimulus parryi A.Gray

= Diplacus parryi =

Species of flowering plant

Diplacus parryi, also known as Parry's monkeyflower or annual red spot monkeyflower, is a species of flowering plant. It is an annual native to northwestern Arizona, eastern California, Nevada, and southwestern Utah in the southwestern United States. This monkeyflower produces both pink and yellow blossoms. In California it is known from the White and Inyo Mountains, where it grows on gravel slopes and washes in creosote bush and desert shrubland from (770) 1200 to 1830 meters elevation.
