= Diplacus thompsonii =

Conservation status
- Unranked (NatureServe)

Scientific classification
- Kingdom: Plantae
- Clade: Embryophytes
- Clade: Tracheophytes
- Clade: Angiosperms
- Clade: Eudicots
- Clade: Asterids
- Order: Lamiales
- Family: Phrymaceae
- Genus: Diplacus
- Species: D. thompsonii

Binomial name
- Diplacus thompsonii G.L.Nesom

Species of flowering plant

Diplacus thompsonii, commonly known as Thompson's monkeyflower, is a species of annual flowering plant in the family Phrymaceae. It is native to the eastern slope of the Sierra Nevada and the White Mountains and Inyo Mountains of central eastern California. It grows on granitic soils and sands on sandy slopes, in dry sagebrush flats, and in open pinyon and Jeffrey pine woodland from 1,800 to 2,600 meters elevation.

The species was described by Guy L. Nesom in 2013.
