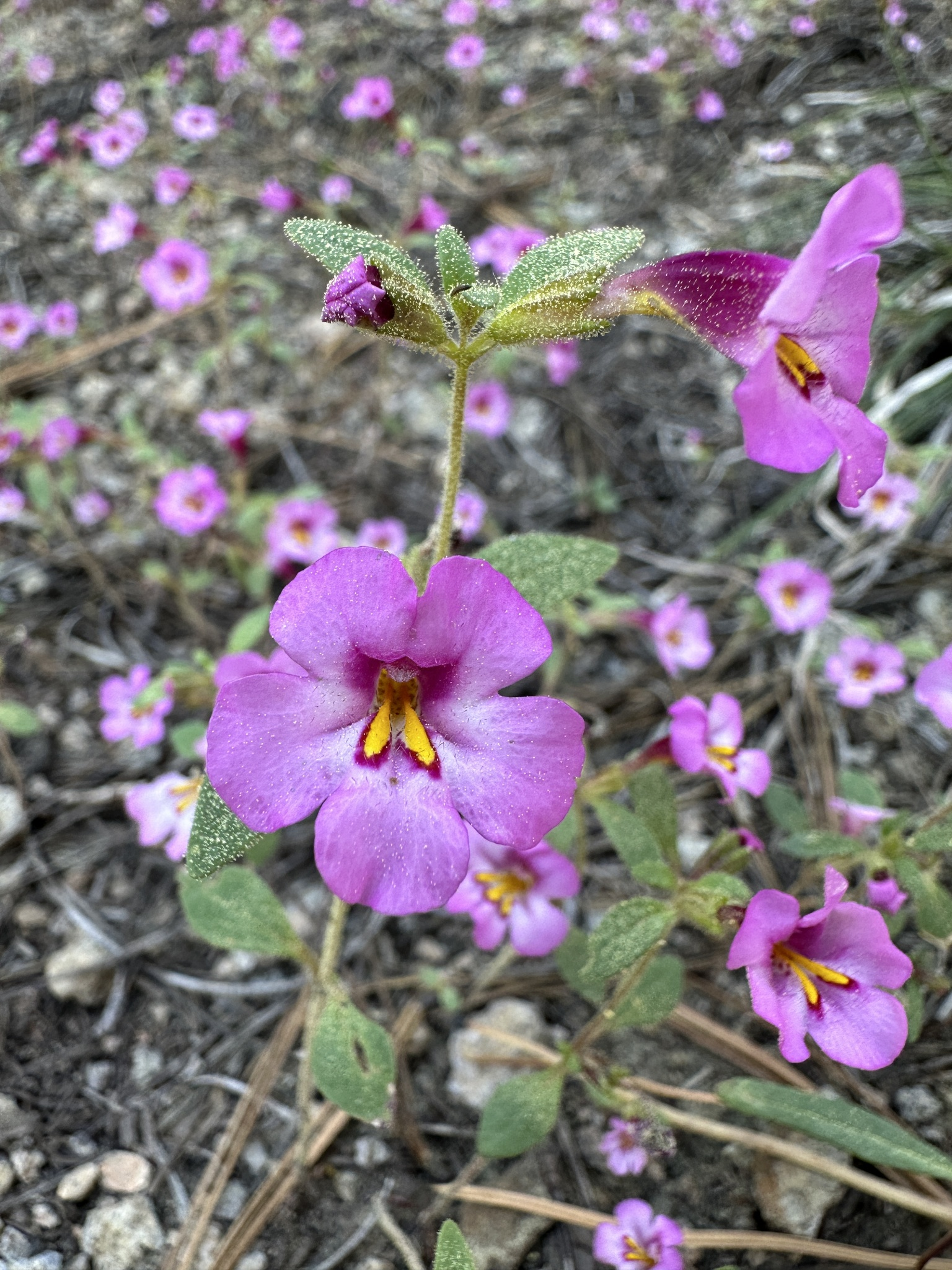

Conservation status
- Apparently Secure (NatureServe)

Scientific classification
- Kingdom: Plantae
- Clade: Embryophytes
- Clade: Tracheophytes
- Clade: Angiosperms
- Clade: Eudicots
- Clade: Asterids
- Order: Lamiales
- Family: Phrymaceae
- Genus: Diplacus
- Species: D. torreyi

Binomial name
- Diplacus torreyi (A.Gray) G.L.Nesom

Synonyms
- Eunanus torreyi (A.Gray) Greene; Mimulus torreyi A.Gray

= Diplacus torreyi =

Species of flowering plant

Diplacus torreyi is a species of monkeyflower known by the common name Torrey's monkeyflower.

== Distribution ==
This species is endemic to eastern montane California, where it is known from the high mountain ranges of the southern Cascades through all the Sierra Nevada into the Tehachapi Mountains.

It grows in open and disturbed mountain habitat types, such as rock outcrops.

== Description ==
Diplacus torreyi is an annual herb growing 4 to 38 centimeters tall. The oppositely arranged oval leaves are up to 4 centimeters long and generally oval in shape. The tubular base of the flower is encapsulated in a thin, green, lightly hairy calyx of sepals. The flower corolla is 1 to 2 centimeters long and divided into a reflexed upper lip and slightly protruding lower lip.

The flower is pink in color with two gold stripes with magenta borders in the mouth, and usually no spotting or other markings.
