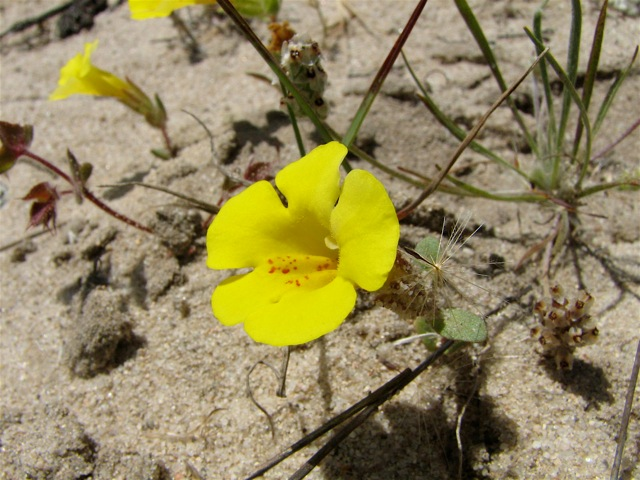

Conservation status
- Critically Imperiled (NatureServe)

Scientific classification
- Kingdom: Plantae
- Clade: Embryophytes
- Clade: Tracheophytes
- Clade: Angiosperms
- Clade: Eudicots
- Clade: Asterids
- Order: Lamiales
- Family: Phrymaceae
- Genus: Diplacus
- Species: D. vandenbergensis

Binomial name
- Diplacus vandenbergensis (D.M.Thomps.) G.L.Nesom (2012)

Synonyms
- Mimulus fremontii var. vandenbergensis D.M.Thomps. (2005)

= Diplacus vandenbergensis =

Species of flowering plant

Diplacus vandenbergensis, commonly known as the Vandenberg monkeyflower, is a species of Diplacus located in the Phrymaceae family. It grows as a small herbaceous annual plant and is native to the Burton Mesa Ecological Reserve in Santa Barbara County, California. According to the U.S. Fish and Wildlife Service it is an endangered species and hence was allocated critical habitat within the reserve in 2014.

== Description ==
This annual plant grows roughly to a height of 20 cm (8 in) before it releases seeds and dies. The leaves are 2–30 mm (0.08–1 in) long and are generally narrowly elliptic in shape. The yellow flowers emerge between May and June, with the pedicel being 1–4 mm long and the calyx 5–14 mm. The tube/throat of the flower is 9–23 mm long. The fruit is 6.5–13 mm long.

== Habitat ==
The primary habitats of this species are chaparral, cismontane woodlands and coastal dunes. It grows in sandy soil between larger shrubs where it receives increased protection from external threats such as wind and animals. Influx of these small areas by invasive plant species such as Pampas grass, Veldt grass and Iceplant pose the greatest risk to this species. It is also threatened by development and off-road vehicles.
