= Diplacus brandegeei =

Conservation status
- Critically Imperiled (NatureServe)

Scientific classification
- Kingdom: Plantae
- Clade: Embryophytes
- Clade: Tracheophytes
- Clade: Angiosperms
- Clade: Eudicots
- Clade: Asterids
- Order: Lamiales
- Family: Phrymaceae
- Genus: Diplacus
- Species: D. brandegeei

Binomial name
- Diplacus brandegeei (Pennell) G.L.Nesom

Synonyms
- Diplacus latifolius (A.Gray) G.L.Nesom, nom. illeg. homonym. post.; Eunanus latifolius (A.Gray) Greene; Mimulus brandegeei Pennell; Mimulus latifolius A.Gray

Species of flowering plant

Diplacus brandegeei, also known as the Santa Cruz Island monkeyflower, is a species of flowering plant. This rare flower survives on Guadalupe Island in Mexico, but is believed to be extirpated on Santa Cruz Island in the United States, possibly because of livestock grazing. This plant has U.S. federal or California state protected status.
