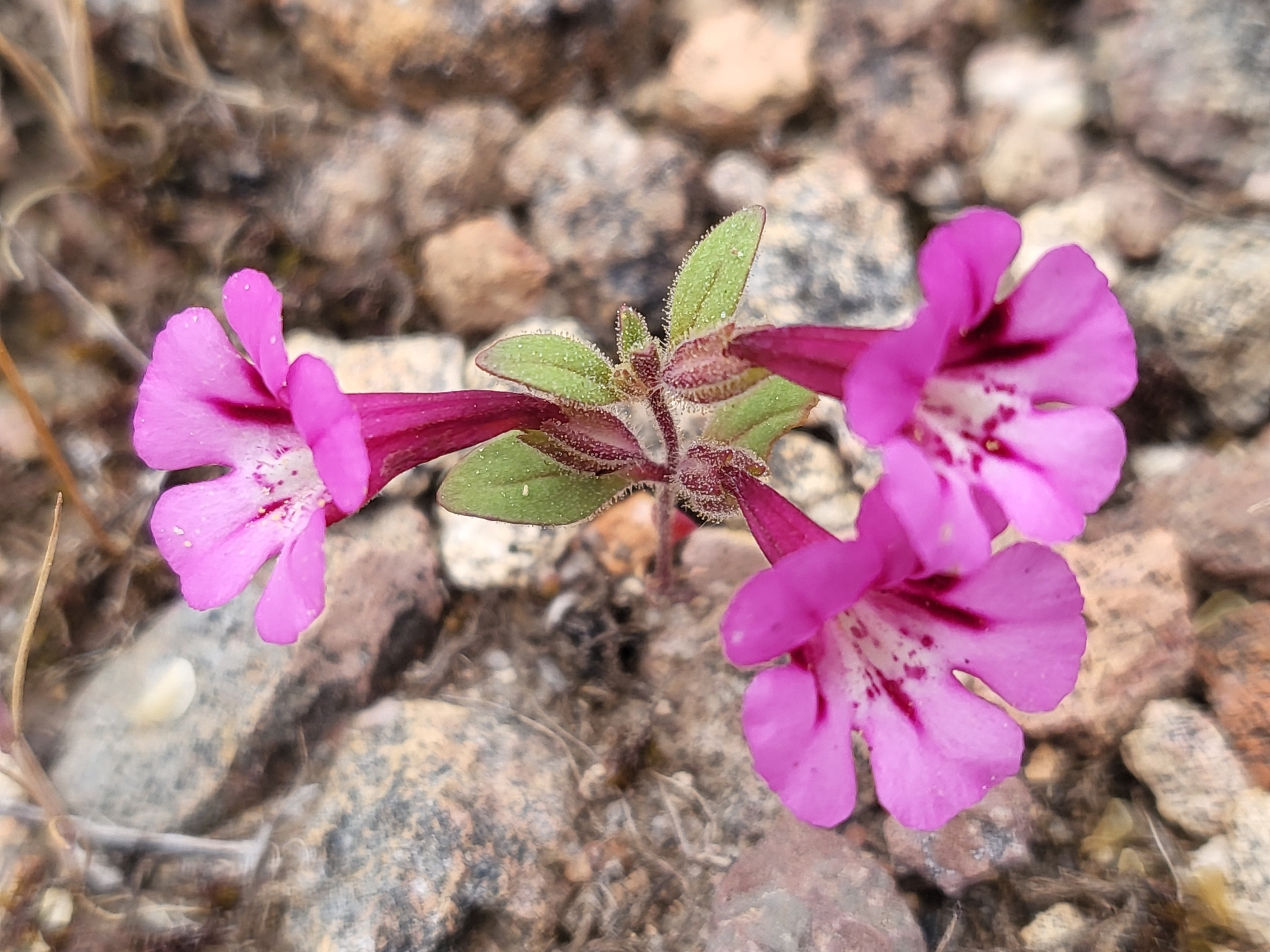
- Napa County, California, 2023

Conservation status
- Apparently Secure (NatureServe)

Scientific classification
- Kingdom: Plantae
- Clade: Embryophytes
- Clade: Tracheophytes
- Clade: Angiosperms
- Clade: Eudicots
- Clade: Asterids
- Order: Lamiales
- Family: Phrymaceae
- Genus: Diplacus
- Species: D. layneae

Binomial name
- Diplacus layneae (Greene) G.L.Nesom

Synonyms
- Eunanus layneae Greene; Mimulus brachiatus Pennell; Mimulus layneae (Greene) Jeps.; Mimulus leynei S.Clay, orth. var.

= Diplacus layneae =

Species of flowering plant

Diplacus layneae is a species of monkeyflower known by the common name Layne's monkeyflower. It is an annual herb that is endemic to California.

== Distribution ==
It is endemic to California, where it is known from the mountains and slopes of the Klamath Range, southern Cascade Range, Warner Mountains, North Coast Ranges, Sierra Nevada, Transverse Ranges, Peninsular Ranges, and the Southern California coastal plain. It grows in rocky barren and disturbed habitat, generally on granitic or serpentine soils.

== Description ==
Diplacus layneae is a hairy annual herb producing a thin, erect stem reaching a maximum height near 28 centimeters. The oppositely arranged leaves are oval in shape and up to 2.5 centimeters in length. The tubular base of each flower is encapsulated in a ribbed calyx of sepals with pointed lobes. The flower is roughly 1 to 2 centimeters in length and any shade of pink from nearly white to deep magenta. There is usually white, yellow, and dark pink or purple mottling in the throat.
