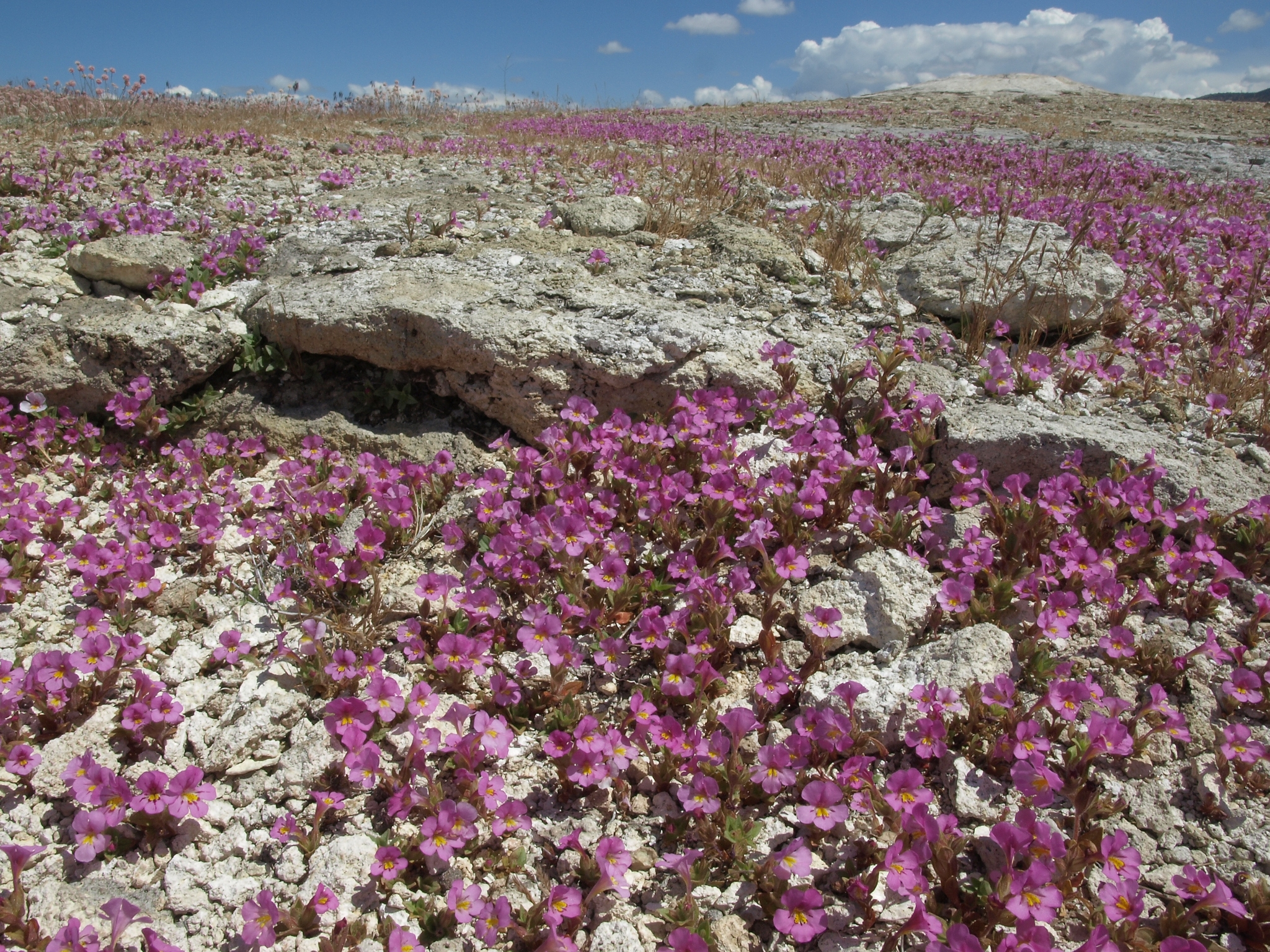
- Washoe County, Nevada, 2016

Conservation status
- Imperiled (NatureServe)

Scientific classification
- Kingdom: Plantae
- Clade: Embryophytes
- Clade: Tracheophytes
- Clade: Angiosperms
- Clade: Eudicots
- Clade: Asterids
- Order: Lamiales
- Family: Phrymaceae
- Genus: Diplacus
- Species: D. ovatus

Binomial name
- Diplacus ovatus (A.Gray) G.L.Nesom

Synonyms
- Mimulus bigelovii var. ovatus A.Gray; Mimulus ovatus (A.Gray) N.H.Holmgren

= Diplacus ovatus =

Species of flowering plant

Diplacus ovatus, also known as steamboat monkeyflower, Carson monkeyflower, or eggleaf monkeyflower, is a species of annual flowering plant. This plant is only known from three locations in northwestern Nevada, including Steamboat Hot Springs.
