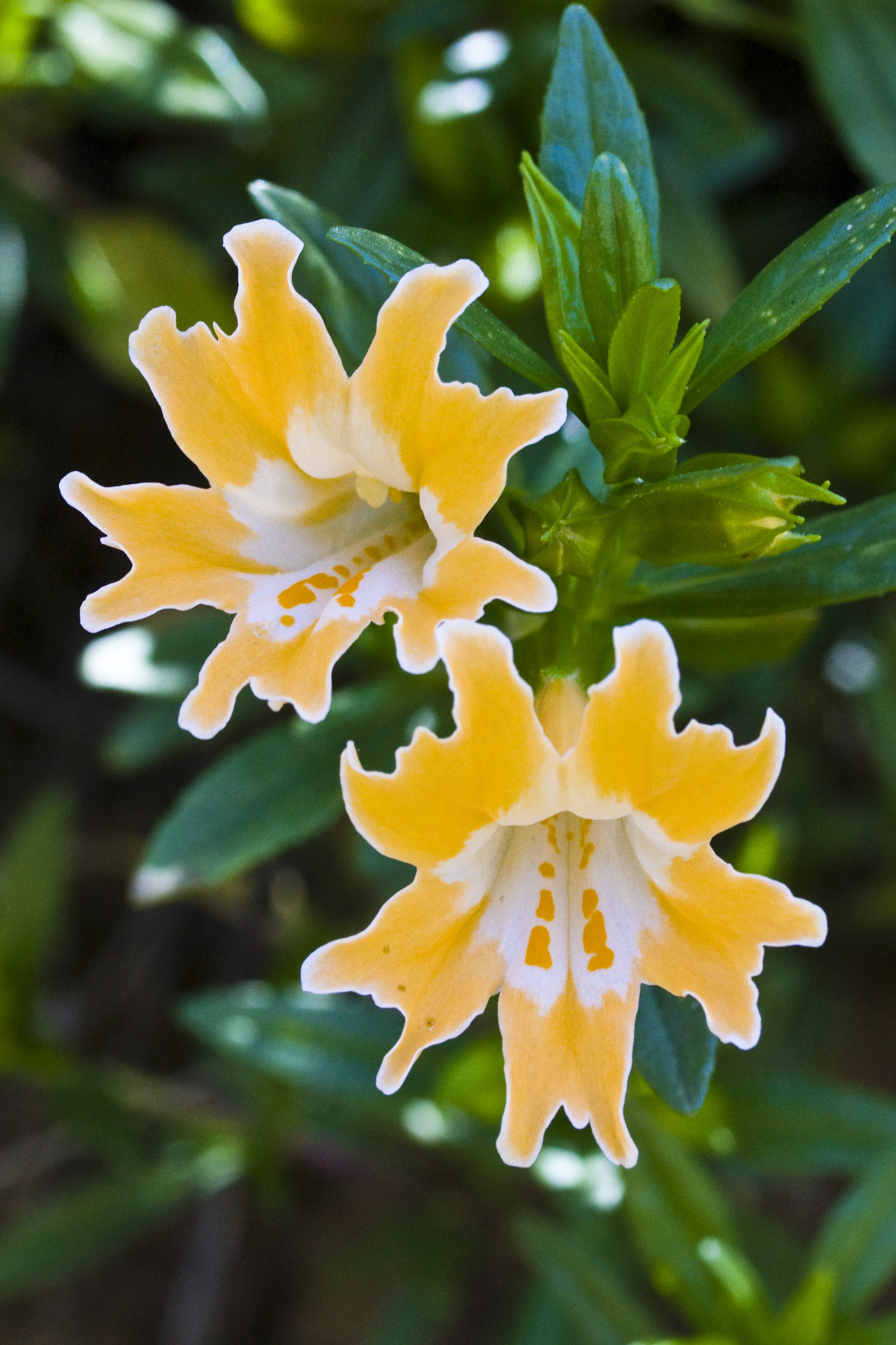
- Los Padres National Forest, 2012

Conservation status
- Imperiled (NatureServe)

Scientific classification
- Kingdom: Plantae
- Clade: Embryophytes
- Clade: Tracheophytes
- Clade: Angiosperms
- Clade: Eudicots
- Clade: Asterids
- Order: Lamiales
- Family: Phrymaceae
- Genus: Diplacus
- Species: D. linearis

Binomial name
- Diplacus linearis (Benth.) Greene

Synonyms
- Diplacus aurantiacus var. linearis (Benth.) D.J.Keil; Diplacus fasciculatus (Pennell) McMinn; Diplacus longiflorus var. linearis (Benth.) McMinn; Mimulus bifidus subsp. fasciculatus Pennell; Mimulus glutinosus var. linearis (Benth.) A.Gray; Mimulus glutinosus f. linearis (Benth.) Voss; Mimulus linearis Benth.; Mimulus longiflorus var. linearis (Benth.) A.L.Grant

= Diplacus linearis =

Species of flowering plant

Diplacus linearis, also known as the Monterey monkeyflower or the chaparral bush monkeyflower, is a species of flowering plant. It is a subshrub or shrub endemic to western California. It has been observed in Monterey, San Benito, and San Luis Obispo counties in California. It is native to the central coast and South Coast Ranges, where it grows in well-drained exposed areas and boulder and rock outcrop crevices.
