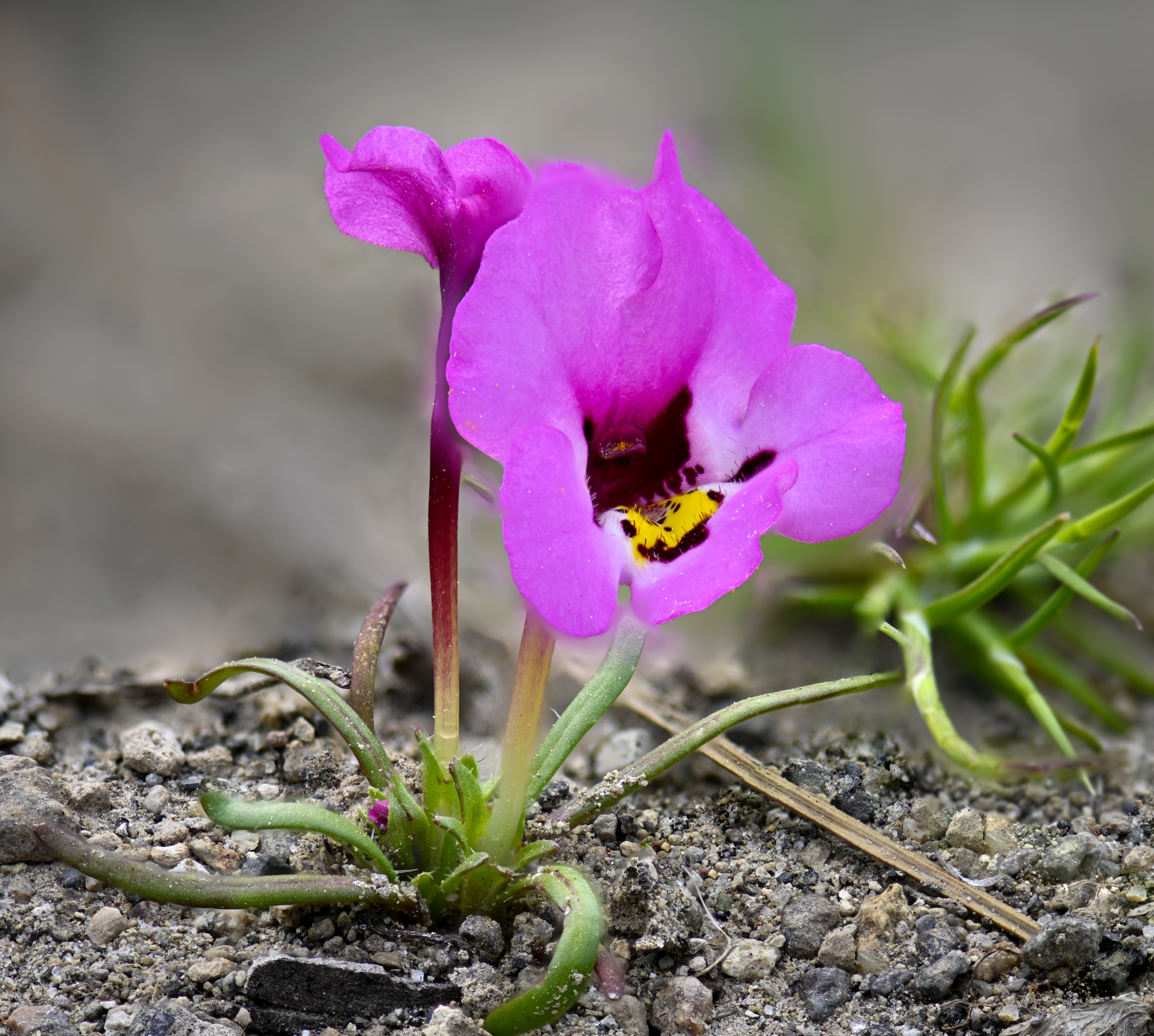

Conservation status
- Vulnerable (NatureServe)

Scientific classification
- Kingdom: Plantae
- Clade: Embryophytes
- Clade: Tracheophytes
- Clade: Angiosperms
- Clade: Eudicots
- Clade: Asterids
- Order: Lamiales
- Family: Phrymaceae
- Genus: Diplacus
- Species: D. angustatus

Binomial name
- Diplacus angustatus (A.Gray) G.L.Nesom

Synonyms
- Eunanus angustatus (A.Gray) Greene; Eunanus coulteri var. angustatus A.Gray; Mimulus angustatus (A.Gray) Curran; Mimulus clarkii Kellogg ex Curran; Mimulus tricolor var. angustatus (A.Gray) A.Gray

= Diplacus angustatus =

Species of flowering plant

Diplacus angustatus is a species of monkeyflower known by the common names purplelip pansy monkeyflower and narrowleaf pansy monkeyflower.

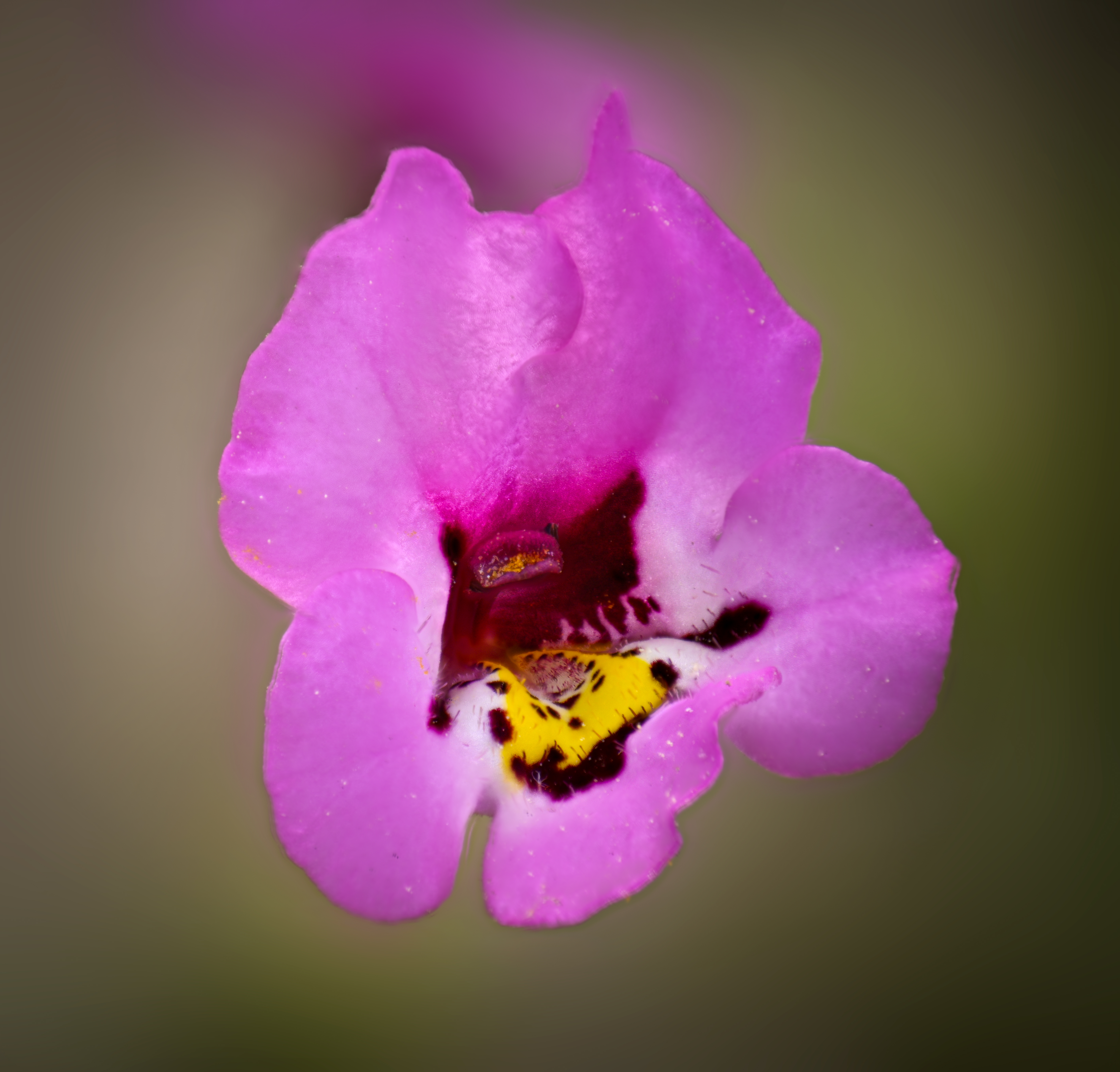
Diplacus angustatus at Napa County, CA.

== Distribution ==
It is endemic to California, where its distribution is scattered around the North Coast Ranges through the San Joaquin Valley and a section of the Sierra Nevada foothills. It grows in moist habitat in open areas, such as vernal pools and meadows, sometimes carpeting an open area with its tiny pink blooms.

== Description ==
Diplacus angustatus is a petite annual herb growing in ground-level tufts with hair-thin stems barely a centimeter tall. Its herbage is green to reddish in color, the paired linear leaves spreading about 1 to 3 centimeters long. The tubular base of the flower is surrounded by a hairy greenish to red calyx of sepals. The flower corolla is pale to bright pink to reddish-purple with one or more large purple spots, and sometimes yellow markings, in the throat. The trumpet-like corolla may be several centimeters long, much longer than the stem on which it is borne.

Research suggests that the population size of this wildflower is positively affected by disturbance of the soil it grows in, especially by the activity of pocket gophers; plants growing on disturbed soil have bigger flowers, fewer plant competitors, and more pollen on their stigmas from greater numbers of neighboring D. angustatus.
