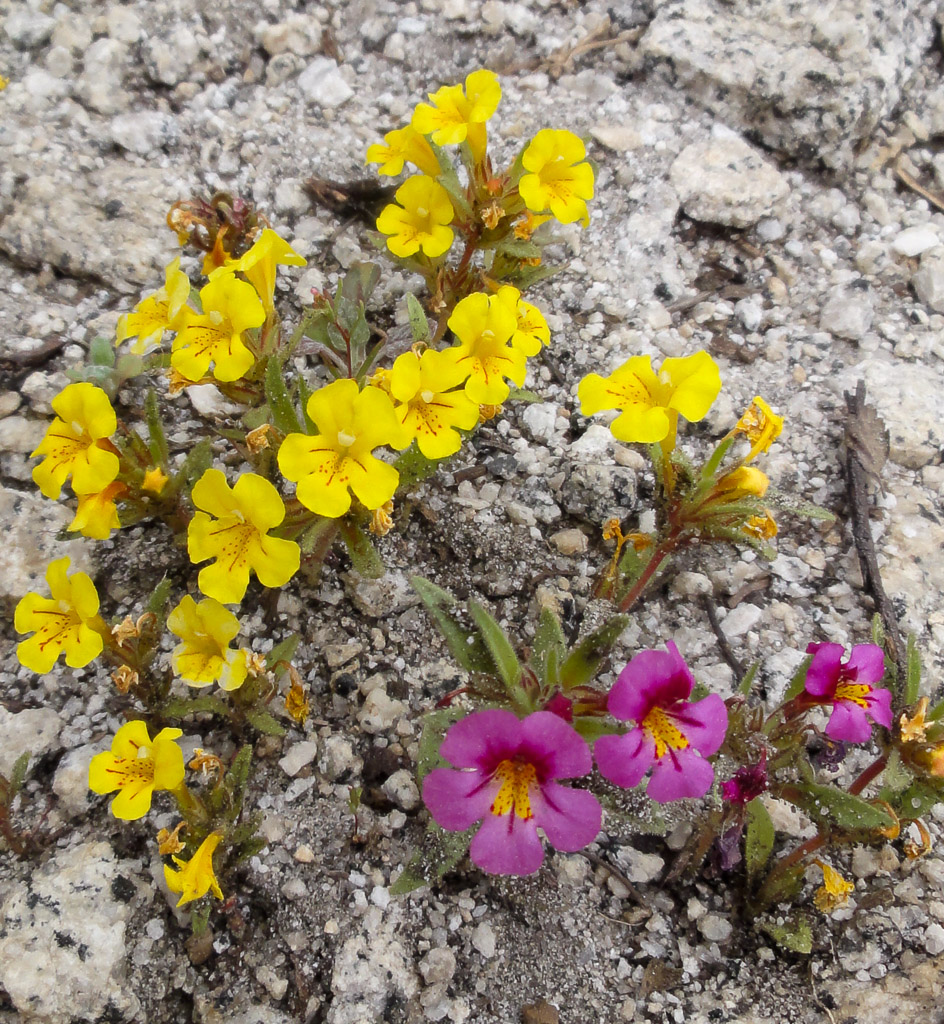
- Diplacus mephiticus, a population with flowers of varied colours

Scientific classification
- Kingdom: Plantae
- Clade: Embryophytes
- Clade: Tracheophytes
- Clade: Angiosperms
- Clade: Eudicots
- Clade: Asterids
- Order: Lamiales
- Family: Phrymaceae
- Genus: Diplacus; Nutt. (1838)

= Diplacus =

Genus of flowering plants

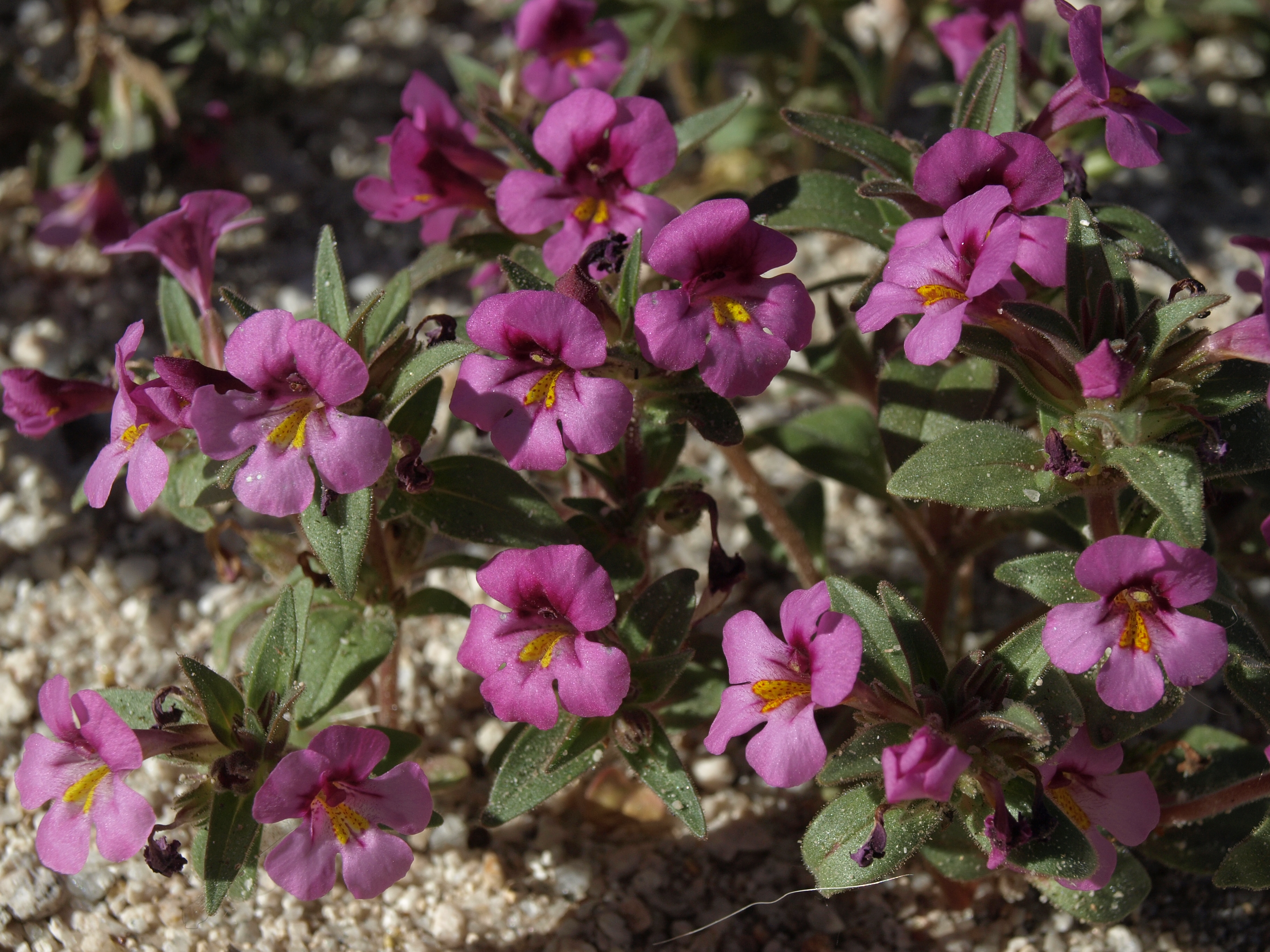
Steamboat monkeyflower, Diplacus ovatus. Carson Range, 2017

Diplacus is a genus of flowering plants in the family Phrymaceae, which was traditionally placed in family Scrophulariaceae. It includes 49 species native to the western United States and northwestern Mexico. Most prefer dry and rocky areas.

The genus Diplacus was first described by Thomas Nuttall in 1838. It was merged into Mimulus no later than 1905, until the 2012 restructuring. The 2012 restructuring of Mimulus by Barker, et al., based largely upon DNA evidence, left seven species in Mimulus, placed 111 into Erythranthe (species with axile placentation and long pedicels), placed 46 into Diplacus (species with parietal placentation and sessile flowers), placed two in Uvedalia, and placed one each in Elacholoma, Mimetanthe, and Thyridia.

== Species ==
49 species are accepted.

- Diplacus angustatus (A.Gray) G.L.Nesom
- Diplacus aridus Abrams
- Diplacus aurantiacus (Curtis) Jeps. – sticky monkeyflower
- Diplacus × australis (McMinn ex Munz) Tulig (D. longiflorus × D. puniceus)
- Diplacus bicolor (A.Gray) Hrusa (synonym Diplacus whitneyi (A.Gray) G.L.Nesom)
- Diplacus bigelovii (A.Gray) G.L.Nesom
- Diplacus bolanderi (A.Gray) G.L.Nesom
- Diplacus brandegeei (Pennell) G.L.Nesom
- Diplacus brevipes (Benth.) G.L.Nesom
- Diplacus calycinus Eastw.
- Diplacus cascadensis G.L.Nesom
- Diplacus clevelandii (Brandegee) Greene
- Diplacus clivicola (Greenm.) G.L.Nesom
- Diplacus compactus (D.M.Thomps.) G.L.Nesom
- Diplacus congdonii (B.L.Rob.) G.L.Nesom
- Diplacus constrictus (A.L.Grant) G.L.Nesom
- Diplacus cusickii (Greene) G.L.Nesom
- Diplacus cusickioides G.L.Nesom
- Diplacus deschutesensis G.L.Nesom
- Diplacus douglasii (Benth.) G.L.Nesom
- Diplacus fremontii (Benth.) G.L.Nesom
- Diplacus grandiflorus (Lindl. & Paxton) Hérincq
- Diplacus graniticola Schoenig
- Diplacus jepsonii (A.L.Grant) G.L.Nesom
- Diplacus johnstonii (A.L.Grant) G.L.Nesom
- Diplacus kelloggii (Curran ex Greene) G.L.Nesom
- Diplacus layneae (Greene) G.L.Nesom
- Diplacus leptaleus (A.Gray) G.L.Nesom
- Diplacus linearis (Benth.) Greene
- Diplacus × lompocensis McMinn (D. aurantiacus × D. longiflorus)
- Diplacus longiflorus Nutt.
- Diplacus mephiticus (Greene) G.L.Nesom
- Diplacus mohavensis (Lemmon) G.L.Nesom
- Diplacus nanus (Hook. & Arn.) G.L.Nesom
- Diplacus ovatus (A.Gray) G.L.Nesom
- Diplacus parryi (A.Gray) G.L.Nesom & N.S.Fraga
- Diplacus parviflorus Greene
- Diplacus pictus (Curran ex Greene) G.L.Nesom
- Diplacus pulchellus (Drew ex Greene) G.L.Nesom
- Diplacus puniceus Nutt.
- Diplacus pygmaeus (A.L.Grant) G.L.Nesom
- Diplacus rattanii (A.Gray) G.L.Nesom
- Diplacus rupicola (Coville & A.L.Grant) G.L.Nesom & N.S.Fraga
- Diplacus rutilus (A.L.Grant) McMinn
- Diplacus stellatus Kellogg
- Diplacus thompsonii G.L.Nesom
- Diplacus torreyi (A.Gray) G.L.Nesom
- Diplacus traskiae (A.L.Grant) G.L.Nesom
- Diplacus tricolor (Hartw. ex Lindl.) G.L.Nesom
- Diplacus vandenbergensis (D.M.Thomps.) G.L.Nesom
- Diplacus viscidus (Congdon) G.L.Nesom
