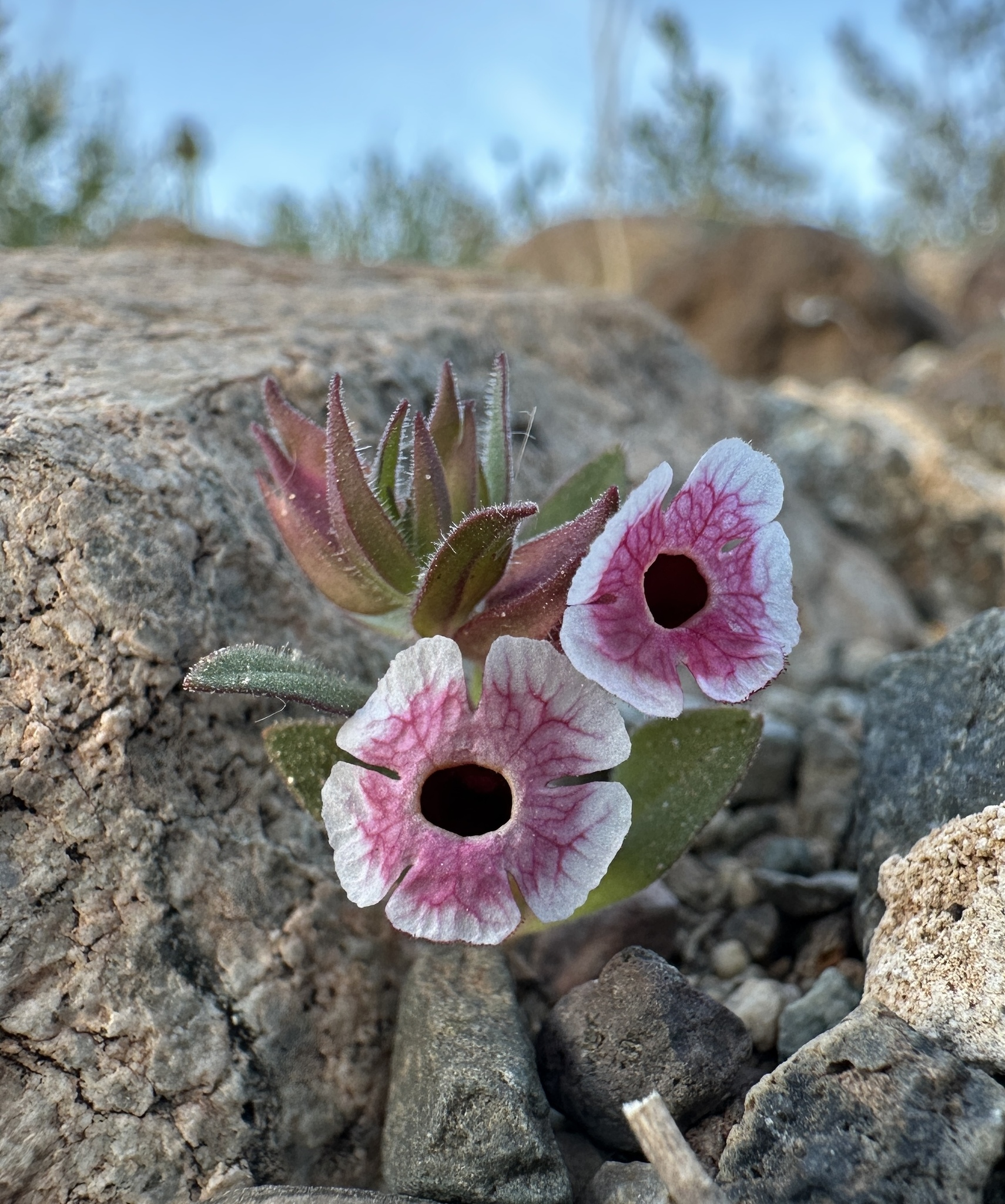
- San Bernardino County, California, 2023

Conservation status
- Imperiled (NatureServe)

Scientific classification
- Kingdom: Plantae
- Clade: Embryophytes
- Clade: Tracheophytes
- Clade: Angiosperms
- Clade: Eudicots
- Clade: Asterids
- Order: Lamiales
- Family: Phrymaceae
- Genus: Diplacus
- Species: D. mohavensis

Binomial name
- Diplacus mohavensis (Lemmon) G.L.Nesom

Synonyms
- Eunanus mohavensis (Lemmon) Greene; Mimulus mohavensis Lemmon

= Diplacus mohavensis =

Species of flowering plant

Diplacus mohavensis is a species of monkeyflower known by the common name Mojave monkeyflower.

== Distribution ==
It is endemic to San Bernardino County, California, where it is known only from the Mojave Desert. It has been found in several locations in and around Barstow, often in gravelly, sandy habitat such as arroyos from 600 to 1000 meters elevation.

The historical range of the plant was wider than it is today; many occurrences have been extirpated. The population sizes and abundance vary, as they probably depend on annual rainfall amounts.

== Description ==
Diplacus mohavensis is a small, hairy annual herb growing at ground level or erect to a maximum height near 10 centimeters. The oppositely arranged leaves are narrow oval in shape and under 3 centimeters in length. The herbage is usually reddish green to red-purple in color. The tubular base of the tiny flower is encapsulated in a hairy, ribbed calyx of red sepals with pointed lobes. The flower has a flat face with five rounded, equal lobes. The corolla lobes are dark-veined pink at the bases and white at the edges. It blooms between April and June.
