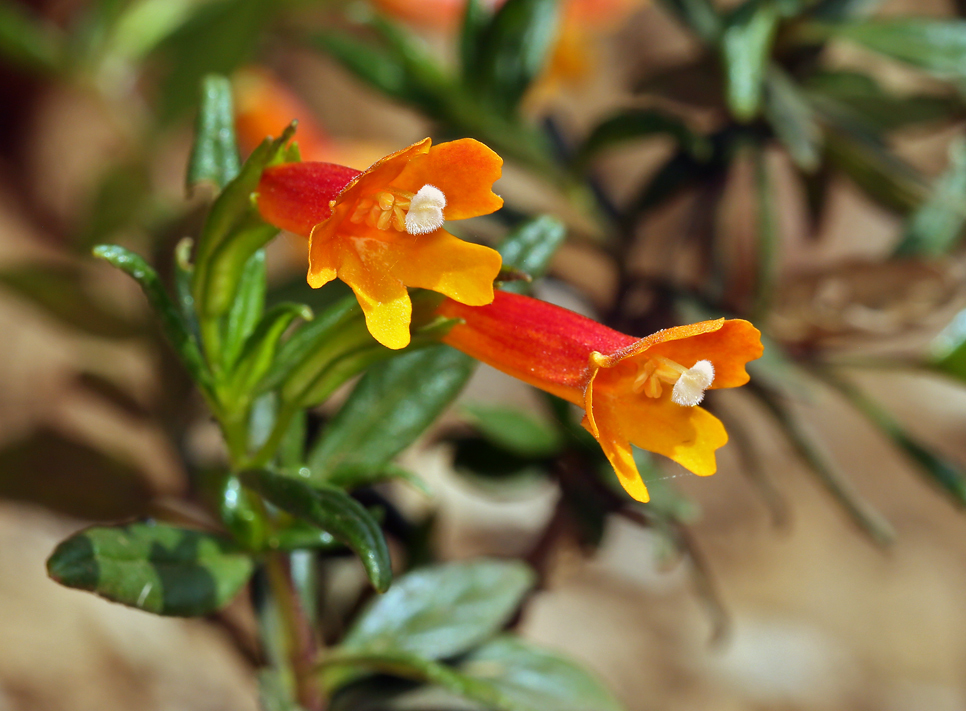

Conservation status
- Apparently Secure (NatureServe)

Scientific classification
- Kingdom: Plantae
- Clade: Embryophytes
- Clade: Tracheophytes
- Clade: Angiosperms
- Clade: Eudicots
- Clade: Asterids
- Order: Lamiales
- Family: Phrymaceae
- Genus: Diplacus
- Species: D. parviflorus

Binomial name
- Diplacus parviflorus Greene

Synonyms
- Diplacus aurantiacus var. parviflorus (Greene) D.J.Keil; Mimulus aurantiacus var. parviflorus (Greene) D.M.Thomps.; Mimulus flemingii Munz; Mimulus kelloggii var. parviflorus (Greene) Jeps.; Mimulus parviflorus (Greene) A.L.Grant

= Diplacus parviflorus =

Species of flowering plant

Diplacus parviflorus, also known as the island bush monkeyflower, is a species of flowering plant endemic to California. This monkeyflower is an uncommon plant found only on four of the Channel Islands of California (Anacapa, San Clemente, Santa Cruz, and Santa Rosa) and in San Diego County. This plant sometimes hybridizes with Diplacus longiflorus. This species is attractive to butterflies including the western buckeye, mylitta crescent, and the variable checkerspot. This species was formerly considered part of the Mimulus aurantiacus species complex.
