= Diplacus deschutesensis =

Conservation status
- Unranked (NatureServe)

Scientific classification
- Kingdom: Plantae
- Clade: Embryophytes
- Clade: Tracheophytes
- Clade: Angiosperms
- Clade: Eudicots
- Clade: Asterids
- Order: Lamiales
- Family: Phrymaceae
- Genus: Diplacus
- Species: D. deschutesensis

Binomial name
- Diplacus deschutesensis G.L.Nesom

Species of flowering plant

Diplacus deschutesensis, the Deschutes monkeyflower, is a species of flowering plant in the family Phrymaceae. It is an annual endemic to Oregon.

The species was described by Guy L. Nesom in 2013.
