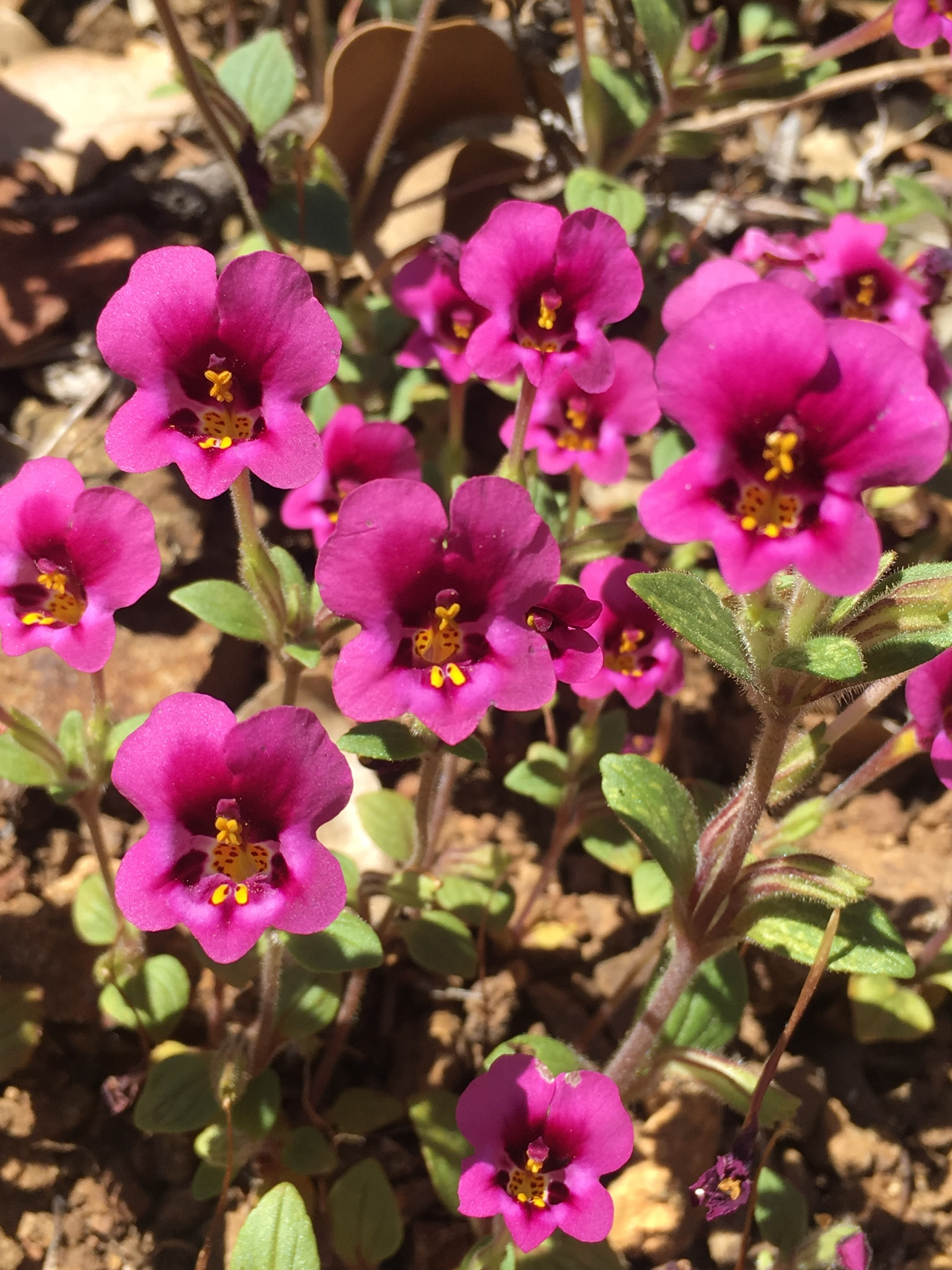

Conservation status
- Apparently Secure (NatureServe)

Scientific classification
- Kingdom: Plantae
- Clade: Embryophytes
- Clade: Tracheophytes
- Clade: Angiosperms
- Clade: Eudicots
- Clade: Asterids
- Order: Lamiales
- Family: Phrymaceae
- Genus: Diplacus
- Species: D. kelloggii

Binomial name
- Diplacus kelloggii (Curran ex Greene) G.L.Nesom

Synonyms
- Eunanus kelloggii Curran ex Greene; Mimulus kelloggii (Curran ex Greene) Curran ex A.Gray

= Diplacus kelloggii =

Species of flowering plant

Diplacus kelloggii is a species of monkeyflower known by the common name Kellogg's monkeyflower. It is native to the mountains and foothills of northern California and southern Oregon, where it grows in bare, disturbed, and shifting substrates, such as recent rockslides and scree.

== Description ==
It is an annual herb producing a hairy stem reaching maximum heights between 1 and 31 centimeters. The oppositely arranged oval leaves are up to 4 centimeters in length and green in color, sometimes with purple undersides. The narrow, tubular base of each flower is encapsulated in a thick calyx of sepals with uneven lobes. The funnel-shaped flower is up to 4.5 centimeters long, opening into a wide mouth, its two upper lobes wider than the three lower. The flower is reddish-purple in color, darkening in the throat where it is spotted with yellow.
