= Diplacus stellatus =

Scientific classification
- Kingdom: Plantae
- Clade: Tracheophytes
- Clade: Angiosperms
- Clade: Eudicots
- Clade: Asterids
- Order: Lamiales
- Family: Phrymaceae
- Genus: Diplacus
- Species: D. stellatus

Binomial name
- Diplacus stellatus Kellogg

Synonyms
- Diplacus glutinosus var. stellatus (Kellogg) Greene; Mimulus stellatus (Kellogg) A.L.Grant

Species of plant

Diplacus stellatus is a small herb in the Phrymaceae. The species is endemic to Cedros Island in the Mexican State of Baja California. It was formerly known as Mimulus stellatus.
