= Diplacus × lompocensis =

Conservation status
- Imperiled (NatureServe)

Scientific classification
- Kingdom: Plantae
- Clade: Tracheophytes
- Clade: Angiosperms
- Clade: Eudicots
- Clade: Asterids
- Order: Lamiales
- Family: Phrymaceae
- Genus: Diplacus
- Species: D. × lompocensis

Binomial name
- Diplacus × lompocensis McMinn

Synonyms
- Diplacus aurantiacus var. lompocensis (McMinn) D.J.Keil; Mimulus aurantiacus subsp. lompocensis (McMinn) Munz

Hybrid species of flowering plant

Diplacus × lompocensis, commonly known as the Lompoc Mesa bush-monkeyflower, is a hybrid species of flowering plant. It is a subshrub or shrub native to Santa Barbara County and southern San Luis Obispo County in central California. It is a hybrid of D. aurantiacus and D. longiflorus where the ranges of the two species overlap, and the plants have floral features intermediate between these two species.

The species was described by Howard Earnest McMinn in 1951.
