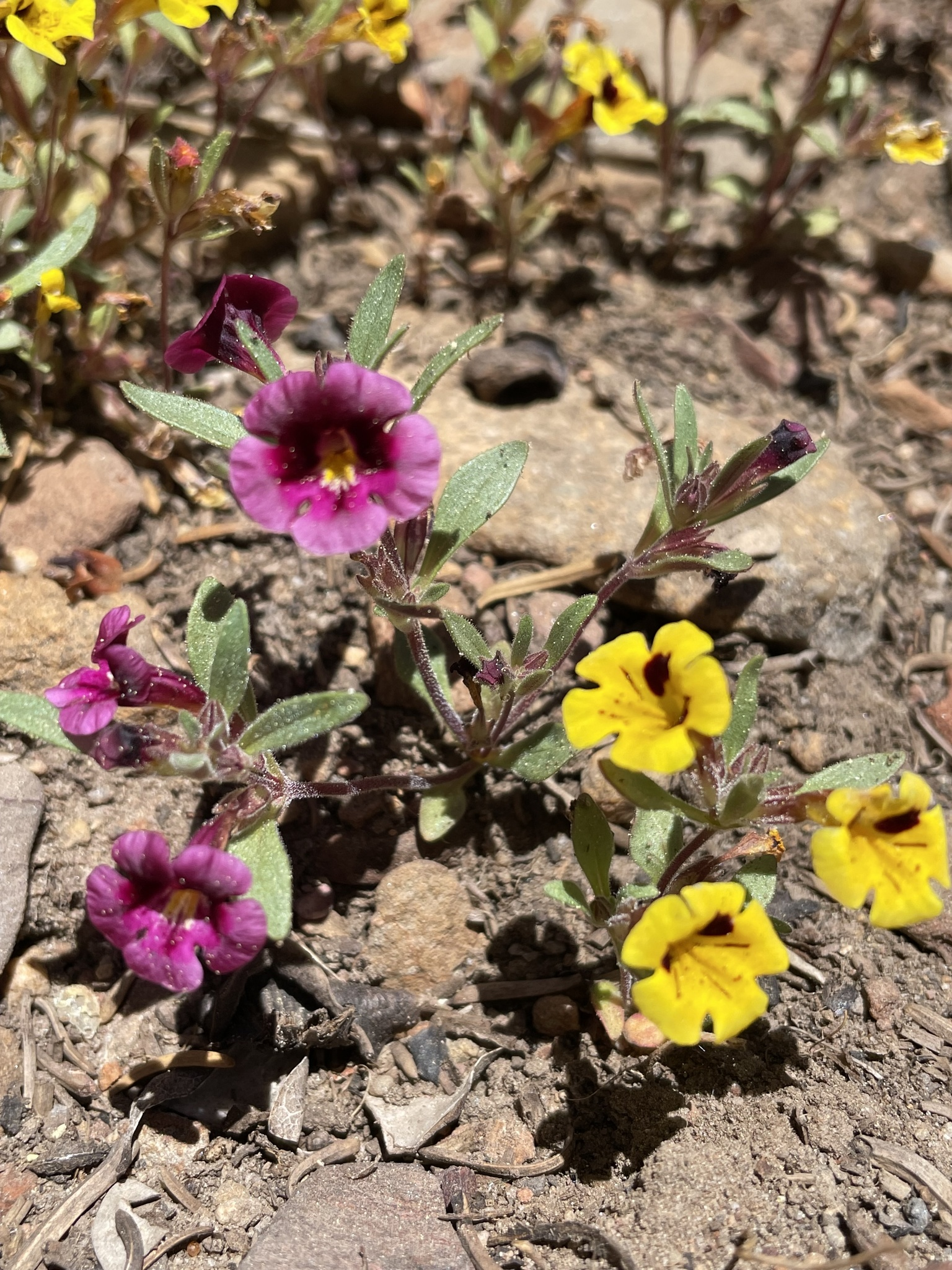
- Giant Sequoia National Monument, 2022

Conservation status
- Imperiled (NatureServe)

Scientific classification
- Kingdom: Plantae
- Clade: Embryophytes
- Clade: Tracheophytes
- Clade: Angiosperms
- Clade: Eudicots
- Clade: Asterids
- Order: Lamiales
- Family: Phrymaceae
- Genus: Diplacus
- Species: D. bicolor

Binomial name
- Diplacus bicolor (A.Gray) Hrusa (2014)

Synonyms
- Diplacus whitneyi (A.Gray) G.L.Nesom (2012); Eunanus bicolor A.Gray (1868); Mimulus nanus var. bicolor (A.Gray) A.Gray (1876); Mimulus whitneyi A.Gray (1886)

= Diplacus bicolor =

Species of flowering plant

Diplacus bicolor is a species of monkeyflower known by the common name Harlequin monkeyflower. It is also known as Diplacus whitneyi.

== Distribution and habitat ==
Diplacus bicolor is endemic to the southern Sierra Nevada of California, such as below the Mount Whitney area. It grows in bare and disturbed habitat, such as exposed talus slopes and roadsides.

== Description ==
Diplacus bicolor is an herb growing up to about 14 centimeters tall. The oval to linear leaves reach up to 2.3 centimeters long. The tubular base of the flower is encapsulated in a dark-ribbed calyx of hairy sepals with pointed lobes.

The flower corolla is between 1 and 2 centimeters in length and may be pink or yellow. It generally has longitudinal stripes in the mouth.
