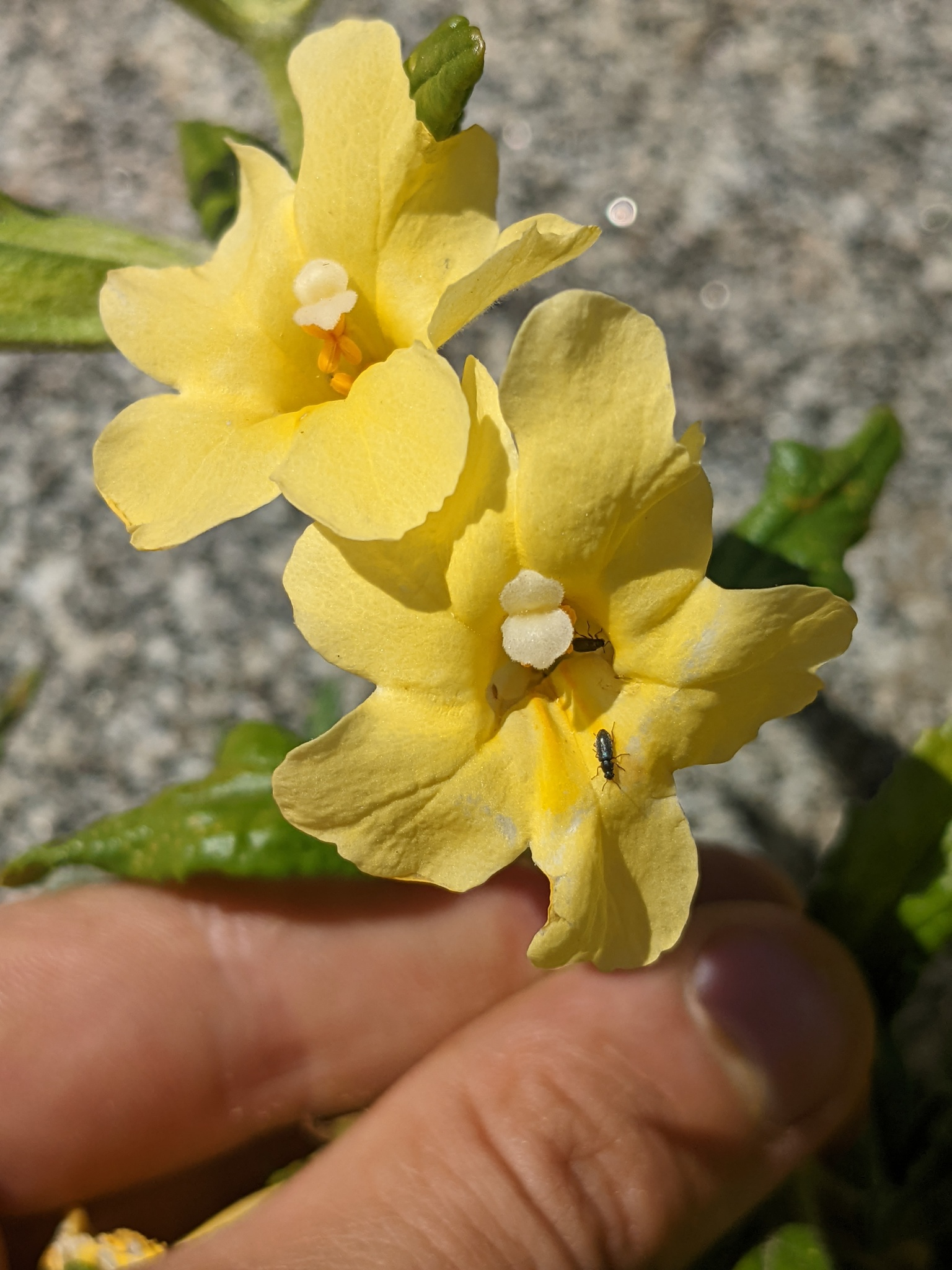

Conservation status
- Vulnerable (NatureServe)

Scientific classification
- Kingdom: Plantae
- Clade: Embryophytes
- Clade: Tracheophytes
- Clade: Angiosperms
- Clade: Eudicots
- Clade: Asterids
- Order: Lamiales
- Family: Phrymaceae
- Genus: Diplacus
- Species: D. calycinus

Binomial name
- Diplacus calycinus Eastw.

Synonyms
- Diplacus aurantiacus var. calycinus (Eastw.) D.J.Keil; Diplacus longiflorus var. calycinus (Eastw.) Jeps.; Mimulus longiflorus subsp. calycinus (Eastw.) Munz; Mimulus longiflorus var. calycinus (Eastw.) A.L.Grant

= Diplacus calycinus =

Species of flowering plant

Diplacus calycinus, also known as the Kaweah River rock bush monkeyflower, is a species of flowering plant. It is endemic to California, where it is native to the southern Sierra Nevada, South Coast Ranges, San Francisco Bay Area, and Transverse Ranges. It typically grows on granite outcrops, boulders, or rocky washes from 700 to 2200 meters elevation.
