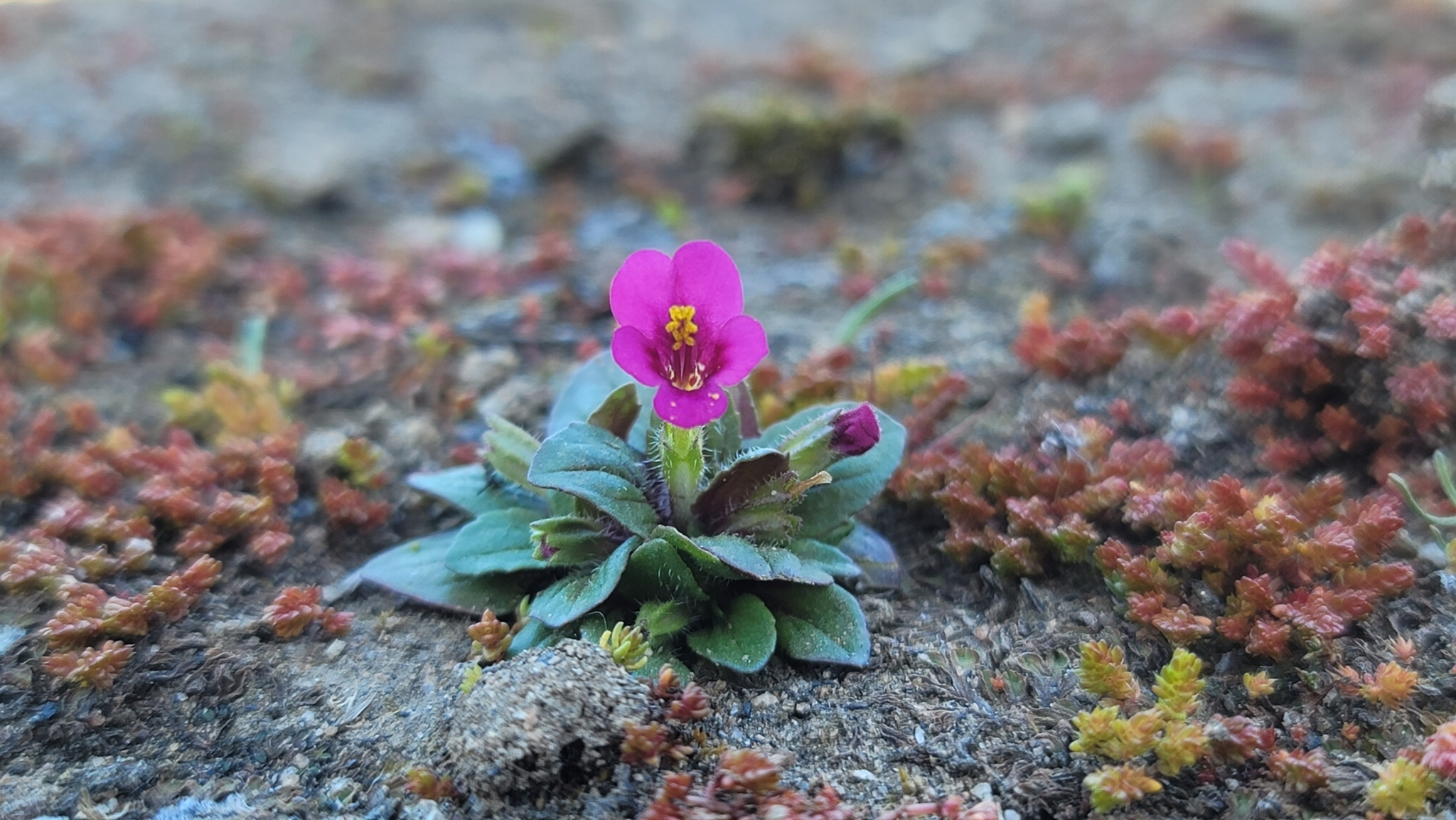
- Tulare County, California, 2022

Conservation status
- Apparently Secure (NatureServe)

Scientific classification
- Kingdom: Plantae
- Clade: Embryophytes
- Clade: Tracheophytes
- Clade: Angiosperms
- Clade: Eudicots
- Clade: Asterids
- Order: Lamiales
- Family: Phrymaceae
- Genus: Diplacus
- Species: D. congdonii

Binomial name
- Diplacus congdonii (B.L.Rob.) G.L.Nesom

Synonyms
- Eunanus congdonii (B.L.Rob.) Greene; Mimulus congdonii B.L.Rob.; Mimulus modestus Eastw.

= Diplacus congdonii =

Species of flowering plant

Diplacus congdonii is a species of monkeyflower known by the common name Congdon's monkeyflower.

== Distribution ==
It is endemic to California, where it has a scattered and localized distribution in the mountains and foothills between the North Coast Ranges and the Peninsular Ranges, and the Sierra Nevada foothills. It grows in moist spots on slopes and in canyons, sometimes in disturbed areas.

== Description ==
Diplacus congdonii is a small, hairy annual herb producing a thin, erect stem no more than 10 centimeters tall. The herbage is purple-green in color. The paired opposite leaves are oval in shape, lined with hairs, and up to about 3 centimeters long. The plant bears narrow-throated, trumpet-shaped magenta flowers 1 to 3 centimeters long.
