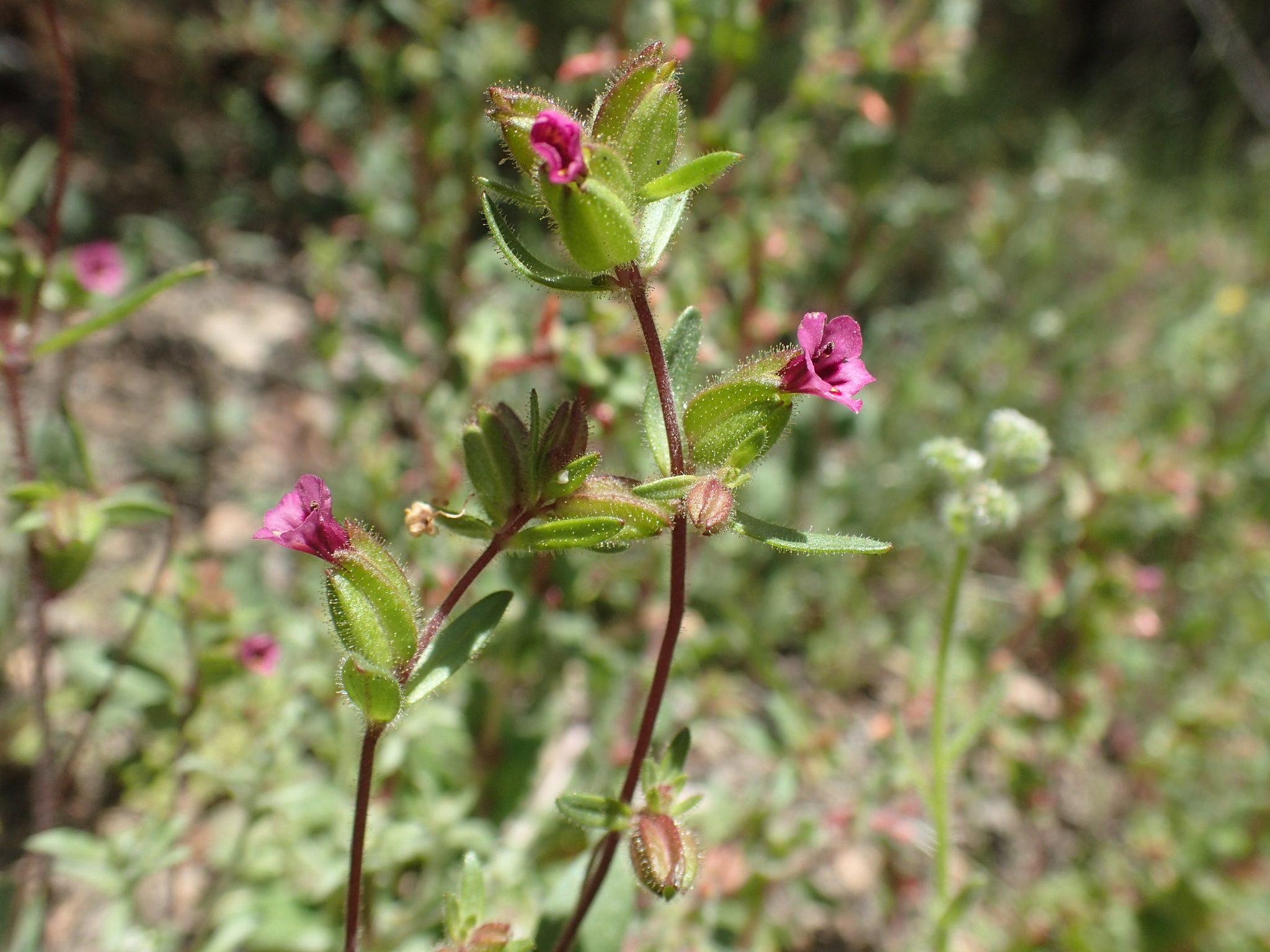
- Pinnacles National Park, 2023

Conservation status
- Apparently Secure (NatureServe)

Scientific classification
- Kingdom: Plantae
- Clade: Embryophytes
- Clade: Tracheophytes
- Clade: Angiosperms
- Clade: Eudicots
- Clade: Asterids
- Order: Lamiales
- Family: Phrymaceae
- Genus: Diplacus
- Species: D. rattanii

Binomial name
- Diplacus rattanii (A.Gray) G.L.Nesom

Synonyms
- Eunanus rattanii (A.Gray) Greene; Mimulus decurtatus A.L.Grant; Mimulus rattanii A.Gray; Mimulus rattanii subsp. decurtatus (A.L.Grant) Munz; Mimulus rattanii decurtatus (A.L.Grant) Penn.; Mimulus rattanii subsp. decurtatus (A.L.Grant) Pennell

= Diplacus rattanii =

Species of flowering plant

Diplacus rattanii is a species of monkeyflower known by the common name Rattan's monkeyflower.

== Distribution ==
It is endemic to California, where it is known from the North and Central Coast Ranges. It grows in open and disturbed habitat types, such as rock outcrops and areas recently cleared by wildfire.

== Description ==
Diplacus rattanii is an annual herb growing 1 to 18 centimeters tall. The oppositely arranged oval leaves are up to 4.6 centimeters long, the newer ones hairy in texture. The flower is no more than a centimeter long, its tubular base encapsulated in a swollen, ribbed calyx of hairy sepals. The flower is magenta in color, often with yellow markings in the mouth.
