= Diplacus compactus =

Conservation status
- Unranked (NatureServe)

Scientific classification
- Kingdom: Plantae
- Clade: Embryophytes
- Clade: Tracheophytes
- Clade: Angiosperms
- Clade: Eudicots
- Clade: Asterids
- Order: Lamiales
- Family: Phrymaceae
- Genus: Diplacus
- Species: D. compactus

Binomial name
- Diplacus compactus (D.M.Thomps.) G.L.Nesom

Synonyms
- Mimulus viscidus var. compactus D.M.Thomps.

Species of flowering plant

Diplacus compactus, the compact monkeyflower, is a species of flowering plant. It is an annual endemic to California, where it grows in the western foothills of the Sierra Nevada from 90 to 1250 metres elevation. It grows in chaparral clearings and in burned and disturbed areas.

It was first described as Mimulus viscidus var. compactus by David M. Thompson in 2005. In 2012 Guy L. Nesom elevated it to a full species as Diplacus compactus.
