= Diplacus clivicola =

Conservation status
- Apparently Secure (NatureServe)

Scientific classification
- Kingdom: Plantae
- Clade: Embryophytes
- Clade: Tracheophytes
- Clade: Angiosperms
- Clade: Eudicots
- Clade: Asterids
- Order: Lamiales
- Family: Phrymaceae
- Genus: Diplacus
- Species: D. clivicola

Binomial name
- Diplacus clivicola (Greenm.) G.L.Nesom

Synonyms
- Eunanus clivicola (Greenm.) A.Heller; Mimulus clivicola Greenm.

Species of flowering plant

Diplacus clivicola, the hill monkeyflower, is a species of flowering plant. It is an annual native to Idaho, Montana, and Oregon.

It grows in moist, exposed mineral soil exposed by natural or human disturbances on bluffs and valley slopes, typically on steep (generally > 60%) south-facing slopes with spring moisture, from 500 to 2000 meters elevation.
