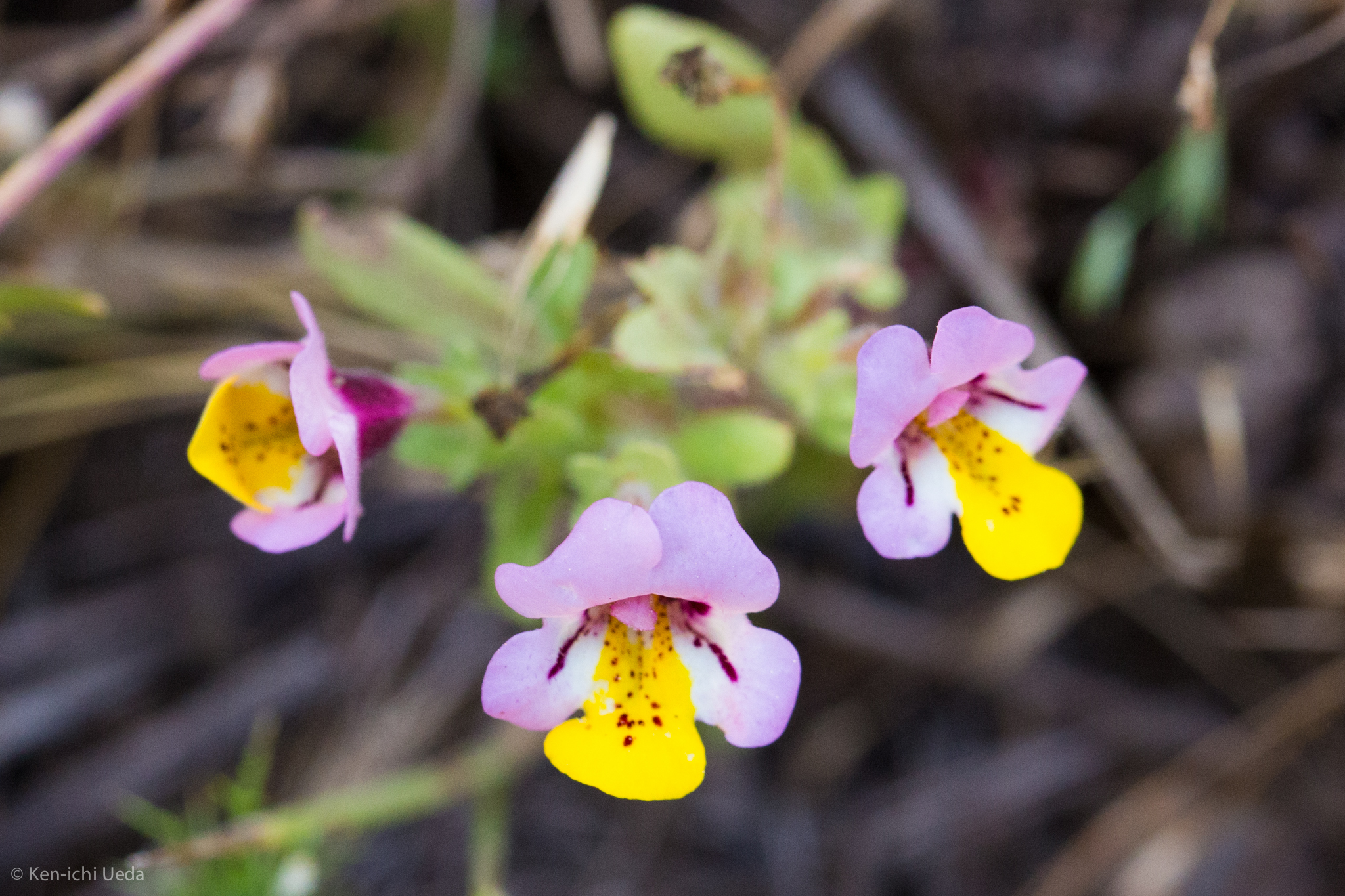
- Tuolumne County, California, 2019

Conservation status
- Imperiled (NatureServe)

Scientific classification
- Kingdom: Plantae
- Clade: Embryophytes
- Clade: Tracheophytes
- Clade: Angiosperms
- Clade: Eudicots
- Clade: Asterids
- Order: Lamiales
- Family: Phrymaceae
- Genus: Diplacus
- Species: D. pulchellus

Binomial name
- Diplacus pulchellus (Drew ex Greene) G.L.Nesom

Synonyms
- Eunanus pulchellus Drew ex Greene; Mimulus pulchellus (Drew ex Greene) A.L.Grant

= Diplacus pulchellus =

Species of flowering plant

Diplacus pulchellus is an uncommon species of monkeyflower known by the common name yellowlip pansy monkeyflower. It was formerly known as Mimulus pulchellus.

== Description ==
Diplacus pulchellus is a petite annual herb growing in small tufts or patches on the ground with hardly any stem. The oppositely arranged leaves are linear in shape and up to 3.5 centimeters long. The flower is 2 to 4 centimeters long and funnel-shaped, with a very narrow tubular base and very wide mouth. The flower is divided into an upper lip with two lobes and a lower with three. It is bicolored, the upper lip lavender to purple and the lower lip golden yellow; sometimes only the wide middle lobe of the lower lip is yellow. The hairy mouth of the flower is usually spotted and speckled with purple.

== Distribution and habitat ==
Diplacus pulchellus is endemic to the Sierra Nevada foothills of California, where it can be found at vernal pools, meadows, and other wet, open habitat, from 600 to 2,000 meters elevation.
