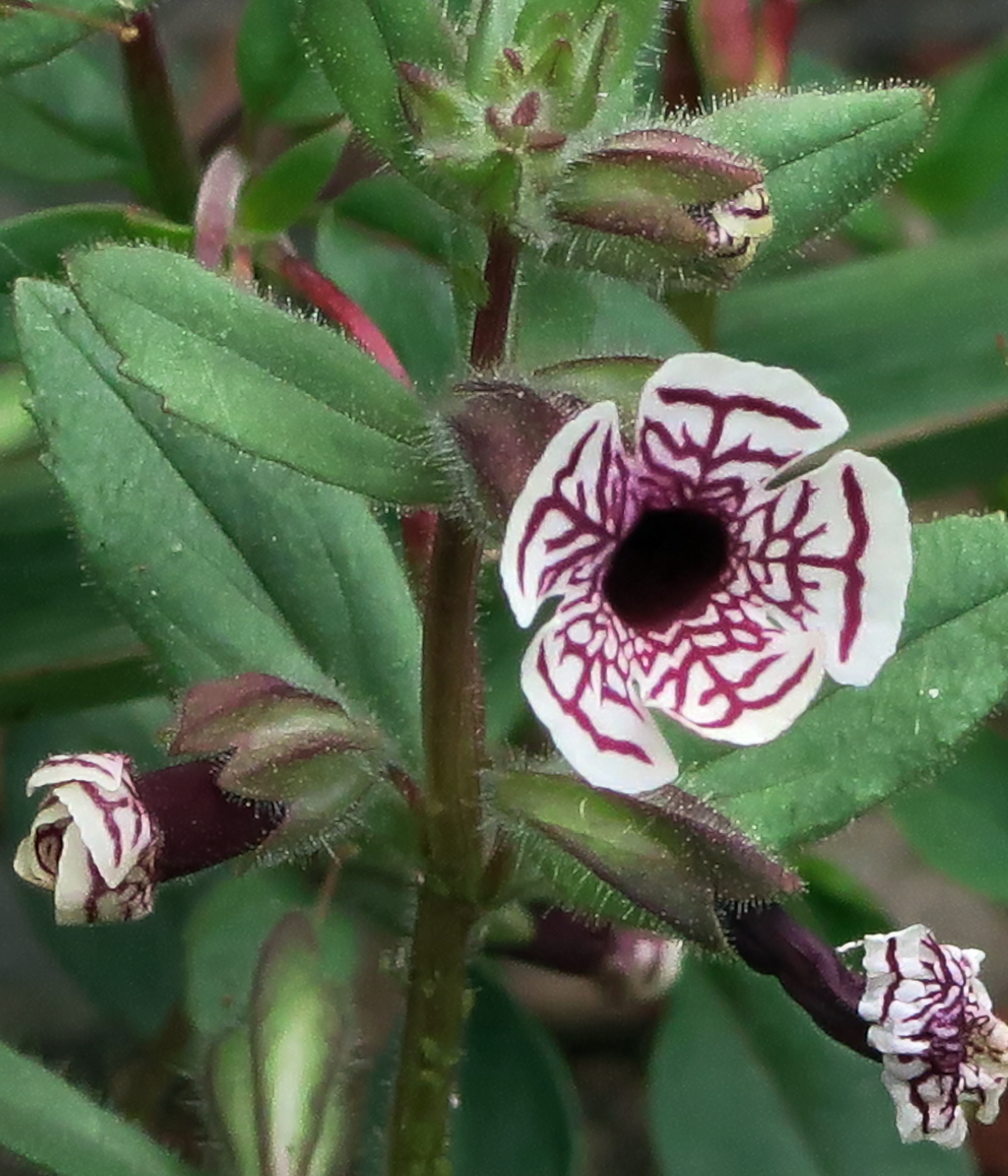

Conservation status
- Imperiled (NatureServe)

Scientific classification
- Kingdom: Plantae
- Clade: Tracheophytes
- Clade: Angiosperms
- Clade: Eudicots
- Clade: Asterids
- Order: Lamiales
- Family: Phrymaceae
- Genus: Diplacus
- Species: D. pictus

Binomial name
- Diplacus pictus (Greene) G.L.Nesom

Synonyms
- Eunanus pictus Greene; Mimulus pictus (Greene) A.Gray

= Diplacus pictus =

Species of flowering plant

Diplacus pictus is a species of monkeyflower known by the common name calico monkeyflower.

== Distribution ==
The wildflower is endemic to California, found only above the southeastern San Joaquin Valley within Kern County and Tulare County.

It is known only from the western Tehachapi Mountains and southernmost Sierra Nevada foothills, at elevations of 135–1,250 metres (443–4,101 ft). It grows in open California oak woodland habitat, in bare rocky soils around granite outcrops.

It is a listed Endangered species on the California Native Plant Society Inventory of Rare and Endangered Plants.

== Description ==
Diplacus pictus is a small annual herb growing from 2–38 centimetres (1–15 in) in height.

The stem is hairy and rectangular in cross-section. The oppositely arranged leaves are somewhat oval in shape and up to 4.5 centimeters long.

The tubular base of the flower is encapsulated in a dark reddish calyx of sepals with uneven lobes. The five-lobed flower has a maroon throat and the circular face is white with bold and intricately patterned purple-brown veining. The bloom period varies from March to May.
