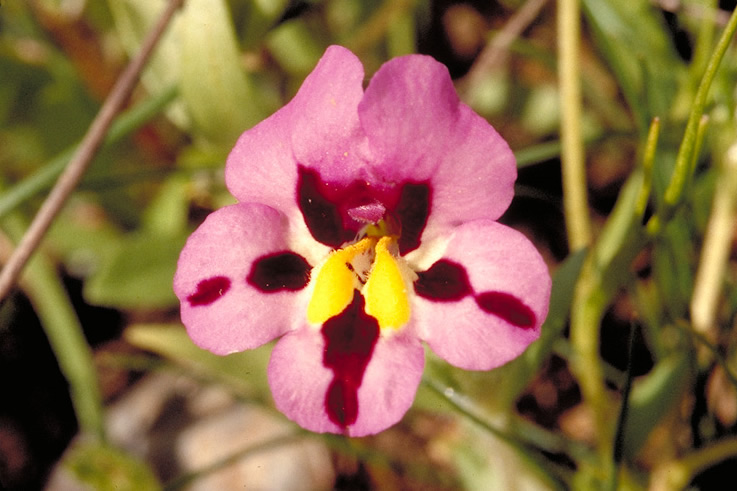

Conservation status
- Apparently Secure (NatureServe)

Scientific classification
- Kingdom: Plantae
- Clade: Embryophytes
- Clade: Tracheophytes
- Clade: Angiosperms
- Clade: Eudicots
- Clade: Asterids
- Order: Lamiales
- Family: Phrymaceae
- Genus: Diplacus
- Species: D. tricolor

Binomial name
- Diplacus tricolor (Hartw. ex Lindl.) G.L.Nesom

Synonyms
- Eunanus coulteri Harv. & A.Gray ex Benth.; Eunanus tricolor (Hartweg ex Lindl.) Greene; Mimulus tricolor Hartweg ex Lindl.

= Diplacus tricolor =

Species of flowering plant

Diplacus tricolor is a species of monkeyflower known by the common name tricolor monkeyflower. It is native to Oregon and California. It grows in seasonally wet habitats such as meadows and vernal pools, including those in the San Joaquin Valley and near north coast oak woodlands. It was formerly known as Mimulus tricolor.

== Description ==
Diplacus tricolor is an annual herb growing up to about 14 centimeters in maximum height. The oppositely arranged, lightly hairy leaves are widely lance-shaped and up to about 4.5 centimeters long. The flower corolla may be up to 5 centimeters long, its narrow tubular base emerging from an uneven calyx of sepals. The wide mouth of the flower is deep pink in color with a white and yellow blotched throat and a large maroon spot at the base of each of the five lobes.
