= Diplacus graniticola =

Conservation status
- Unranked (NatureServe)

Scientific classification
- Kingdom: Plantae
- Clade: Embryophytes
- Clade: Tracheophytes
- Clade: Angiosperms
- Clade: Eudicots
- Clade: Asterids
- Order: Lamiales
- Family: Phrymaceae
- Genus: Diplacus
- Species: D. graniticola

Binomial name
- Diplacus graniticola Schoenig

Species of flowering plant

Diplacus graniticola, the granite-crack monkeyflower, is a species of flowering plant endemic to the Sierra Nevada of California. It is a low-growing annual, 6-15 cm tall, which grows in cracks and crevices on granite rocks from 300 to 2100 meters elevation.

The species was described by Steve E. Schoenig in 2017.
