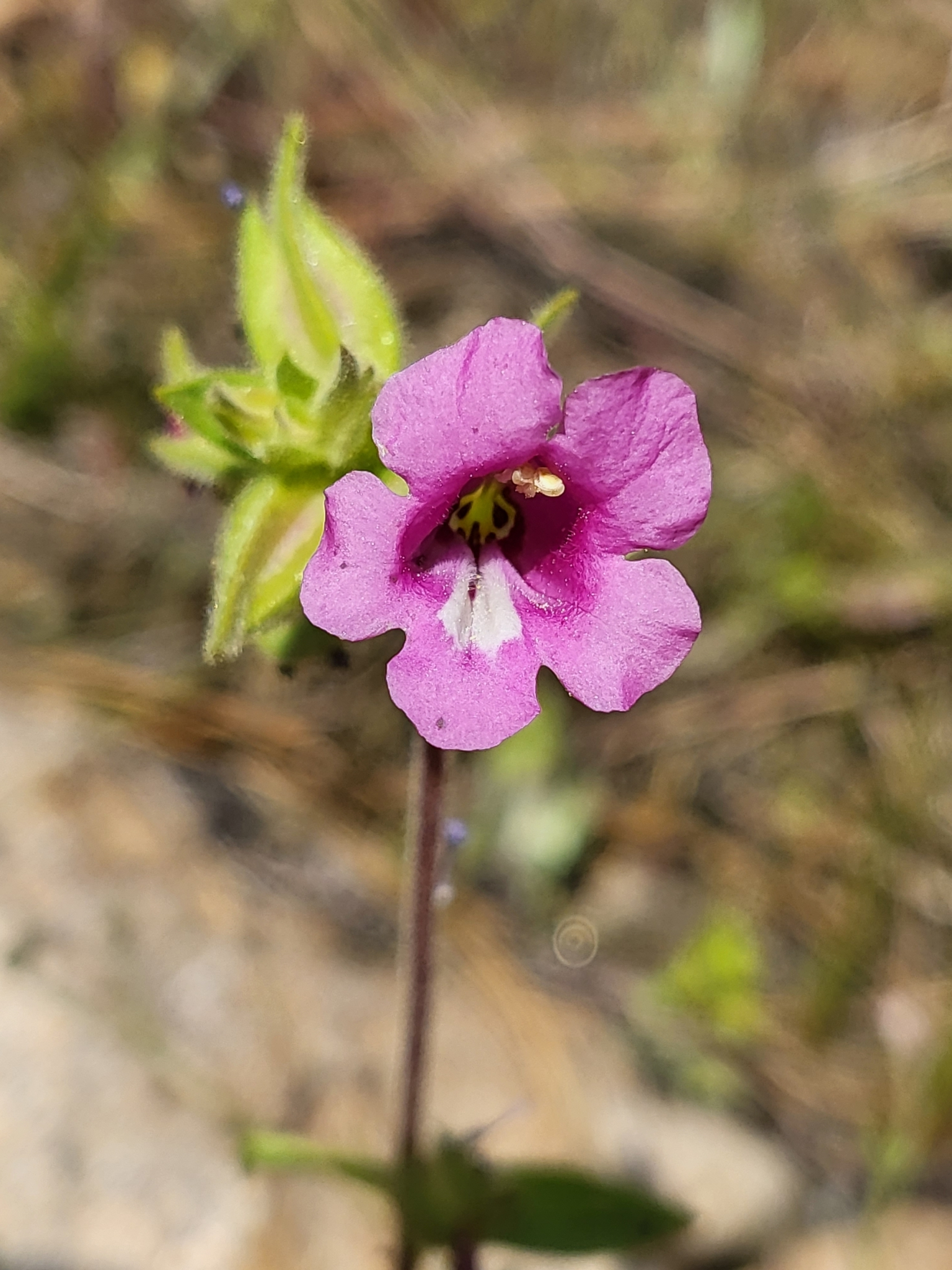
- Tulare County, California, 2023

Conservation status
- Apparently Secure (NatureServe)

Scientific classification
- Kingdom: Plantae
- Clade: Embryophytes
- Clade: Tracheophytes
- Clade: Angiosperms
- Clade: Eudicots
- Clade: Asterids
- Order: Lamiales
- Family: Phrymaceae
- Genus: Diplacus
- Species: D. bolanderi

Binomial name
- Diplacus bolanderi (A.Gray) G.L.Nesom

Synonyms
- Eunanus bolanderi (A.Gray) Greene; Mimulus bolanderi A.Gray; Mimulus bolanderi var. brachydontus A.L.Grant; Mimulus brevipes A.Gray, nom. illeg. homonym. post.; Mimulus platylaemus Pennell

= Diplacus bolanderi =

Species of flowering plant

Diplacus bolanderi is a species of monkeyflower known by the common name Bolander's monkeyflower.

== Distribution ==
It native to California and southwestern Oregon (Jackson County) where it grows in the chaparral, granite outcrops, and other habitat in the coastal and inland mountains and foothills, from the North Coast Ranges to the Sierra Nevada to the western Transverse Ranges.

== Description ==
Diplacus bolanderi is a hairy annual herb producing an erect stem reaching maximum heights anywhere from 2 to 90 centimeters. The lance-shaped to oval leaves are up to 6 centimeters long and arranged in opposite pairs about the stem. The base of the flower is encapsulated by a hairy, ribbed calyx of sepals with pointed lobes. The flower has a tubular throat and a wide, five-lobed mouth. It is 1 to 3 centimeters long and pink in color, usually with blotches of white in the throat.
