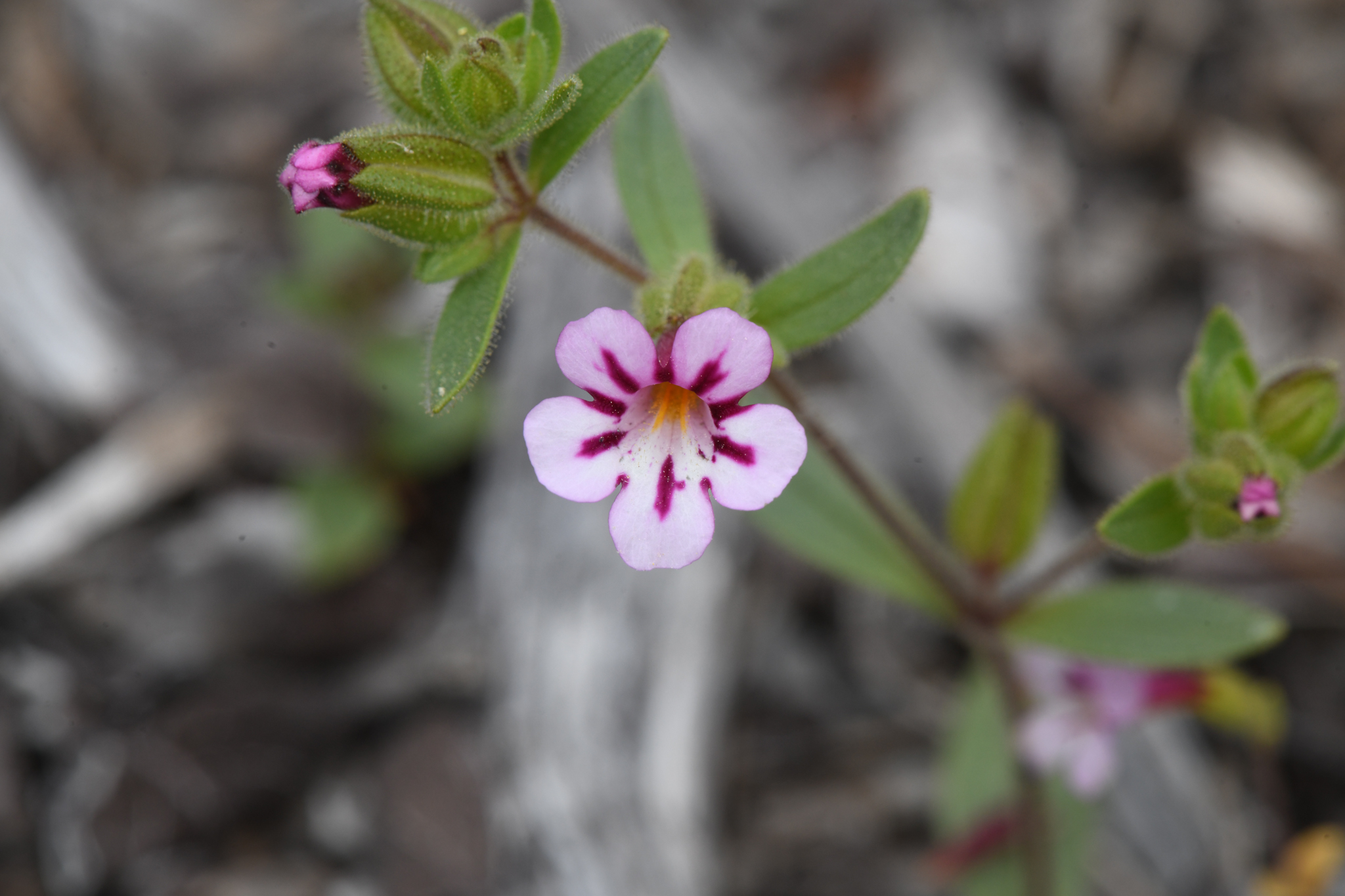
- Mariposa County, California, 2023

Conservation status
- Vulnerable (NatureServe)

Scientific classification
- Kingdom: Plantae
- Clade: Embryophytes
- Clade: Tracheophytes
- Clade: Angiosperms
- Clade: Eudicots
- Clade: Asterids
- Order: Lamiales
- Family: Phrymaceae
- Genus: Diplacus
- Species: D. viscidus

Binomial name
- Diplacus viscidus (Congdon) G.L.Nesom

Synonyms
- Mimulus fremontii var. viscidus (Congdon) Jeps.; Mimulus subsecundus var. viscidus (Congdon) A.L.Grant; Mimulus viscidus Congdon

= Diplacus viscidus =

Species of flowering plant

Diplacus viscidus is a species of monkeyflower known by the common name sticky monkeyflower or viscid monkeyflower.

== Description ==
According to the Jepson herbarium, "Diplacus viscidus is a hairy annual herb growing 6 to 37 centimeters tall. It is a 1 per node type of flower." The tubular base of the flower is encapsulated in a swollen, ribbed calyx of hairy sepals with pointed lobes. Additionally Guy L Nesom describes, " Corolla with dark red-purple midveins on lobes, extending from throat, throat ceiling glabrous, limb usually pubescent on face; style glandular-puberulent; lower stigma lobe 1.5 times longer than upper; stems (3–)6–37 cm."

== Taxonomy ==
Originally Diplacus viscidus was not seen as its own. It was mistakenly categorized as Mimulus Viscidus. The reclassification of a research done that, “included 188 species divided into 13 genera” was what made this discovery possible. When looking closely at characteristics, genes, and DNA a separation of Genus was made. In 2012 the new classification Diplacus viscidus appeared.

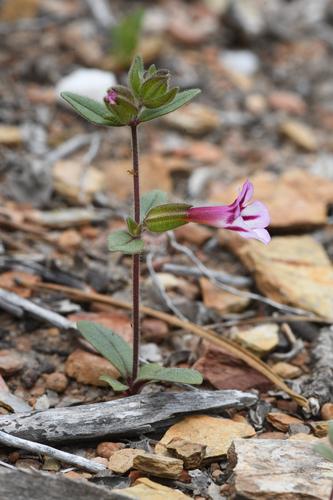
Full body of Diplacus viscidus growing in Mariposa County, California, 2023

== Distribution ==
In the data collected for places of habitat, Diplacus viscidus is endemic to the western Sierra Nevada foothills of California, where it grows in bare and disturbed habitat, such as areas recently cleared by wildfire. During mid spring and summer in places with elevation of 90 to 1300m the species could be found in Amador, Calaveras, Eldorado, Mariposa, Merced, and Tuolumne.
