= François Hérincq =

French botanist and gardener

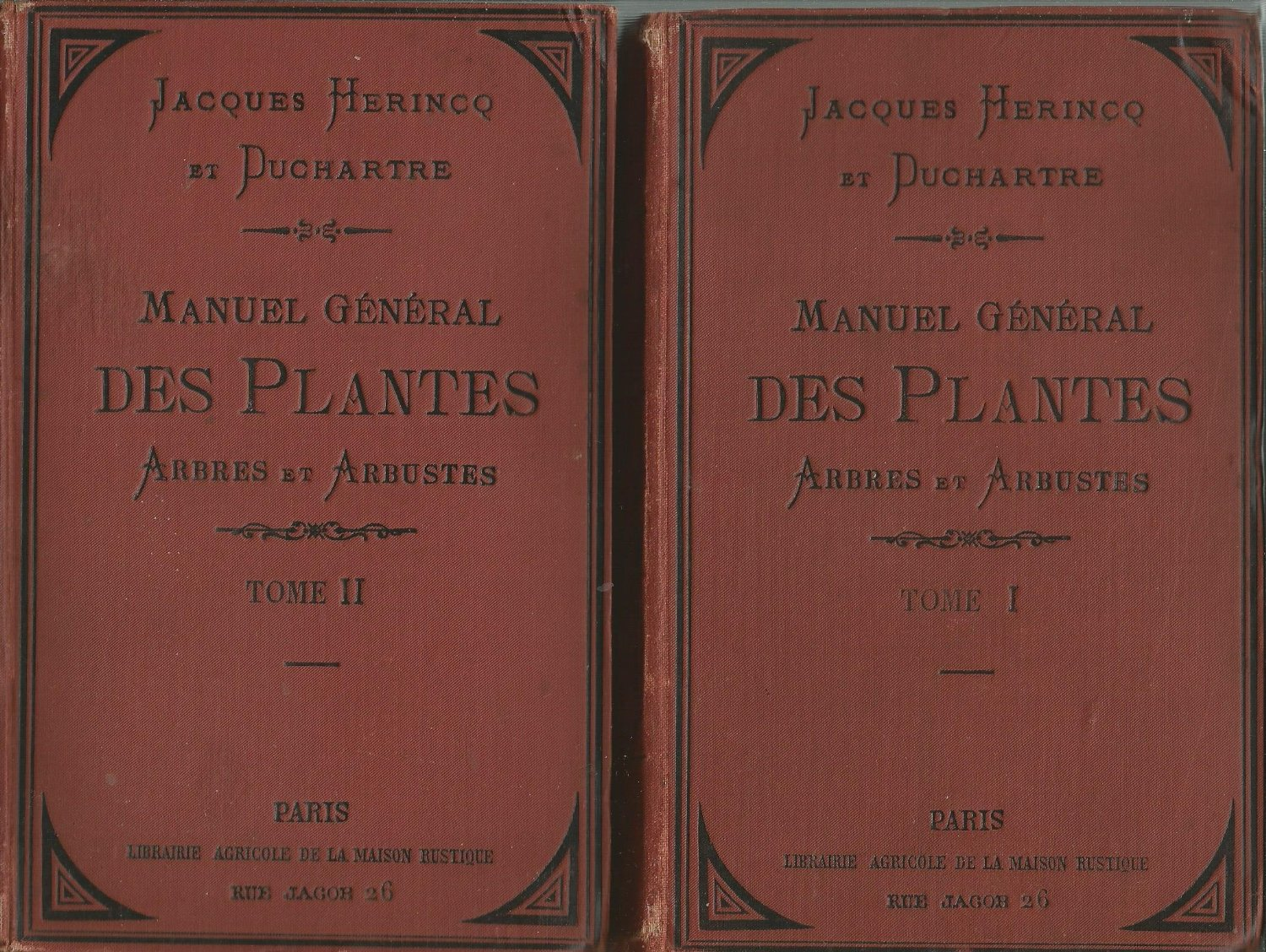

François Hérincq (French pronunciation: [fʁɑ̃swa eʁɛ̃k]; 4 June 1820 – 15 June 1891) was a French botanist and gardener at the Muséum d'Histoire Naturelle in Paris. He was also the editor of "L'Horticulteur français, journal des amateurs et des intérêts horticoles", which was published from 1851-1872, illustrating some 414 plants.

The botanical genus Herincquia (family Gesneriaceae) is named in his honor.

== Publications ==
- "L'Horticulteur Francais de Mil Huit Cent Cinquante Et Un: Journal Des Amateurs Et Des Interets Horticoles" - François Hérincq (1851-1872)
- "Flore des jardins de l'Europe, manuel général des plantes, arbres et arbustes" - Antoine Jacques, François Hérincq, Charles Naudin (1860)
- "Le Règne végétal divisé en traité de botanique générale, flore médicale et usuelle, horticulture botanique" - François Hérincq (1864)
- "Le nouveau jardinier illustré" (1866)
- "Il n'y a pas de sève descendante, extrait des dissertations sur la végétation" - François Hérincq (1867)
- "Observations critiques sur l'origine des plantes domestiques" - François Hérincq (1869)
- "La Verite Sur Le Pretendu Silphion de La Cyrenaique" - Francois Herincq (1876)
- "Végétaux d'ornement : donnant des notions générales sur l'horticulture florale" - François Hérincq, Aristide Dupuis et A. Pilon et Cie (1884)
