= Adele L. Grant =

American botanist and academic (1881–1969)

- Born: Adele Gerard Lewis; June 3, 1881; Carpinteria, California, US
- Died: June 19, 1969 (aged 88); Inglewood, California, US
- Known for: Founder of Graduate Women in Science and Prytanean Women's Honor Society

Academic background
- Education: University of California, Berkeley, B.S., 1903; Washington University in St. Louis, M.Sc. and Ph.D.

Academic work
- Discipline: Botany
- Institutions: Cornell University; Huguenot College; Missouri Botanical Garden; University of California, Los Angeles; San Francisco State College; University of Southern California; George Pepperdine College

Adele Gerard Lewis Grant (June 3, 1881 – June 19, 1969) was an American botanist, academic, and plant collector. She founded the Prytanean Women's Honor Society, the first U.S. collegiate honor society for women, and Sigma Delta Epsilon, a scientific fraternity for women graduate students which survives as the national organization Graduate Women in Science.

== Early life ==
Adele Gerard Lewis was born in Carpinteria, California in 1881. Her parents were Rebecca and Henry Lewis, a wealthy farmer and rancher in Capinteria. She had three siblings and several half-siblings from her father's previous marriages.

She attended the University of California at Berkeley, graduating with B.S. degrees in chemistry and zoology in May 1903. While at Berkeley, she founded and was the first president of the Prytanean Women's Honor Society, with faculty advisor Mary Bennett Ritter, in the fall of 1900. This was the first women's collegiate honor society in the United States. Following her vision, the group raised money to start student healthcare program and a loan fund for female students.

She continued with her studies, enrolling in the Henry Shaw School of Botany at Washington University in St. Louis, earning an M.Sc. in botany. While in graduate school, she was a teaching fellow and also worked at the Missouri Botanical Garden. In March 1905, she discovered four new species in Pacific Coast flora.

While working on her Ph.D. in botany from Washington University in St. Louis, she returned to California. She went on plant collecting trips to Central America, Mexico, and California. She worked briefly for the California Fish and Commission, detailing the economic value of birds.

From 1916 to 1917, she was a graduate student at Stanford University. While at Standford, she was admitted to Sigma Xi science and engineering honor society, as a graduate student in botany. She also took graduate classes at the University of California and the University of Chicago.

In the summers of 1917 and 1920, she taught at the Sierra Summer School, jointly sponsored by the state of California and U.S. Forestry Department. In July 1918, Grant taught at the summer session of the Fresno State Normal School.

== Career ==
After receiving her Ph.D., Grant joined the faculty of Cornell University, starting around 1920. At Cornell in May 1921, she started and served as the first president of Sigma Delta Epsilon, a scientific women's fraternity for graduate students which survives as the national organization Graduate Women in Science.

From February 1926 to 1930, she was head of the department of botany at Huguenot University College in Wellington, South Africa. While in South Africa, she collected plants, mostly from the Scrophulariaceae family. She also went on collecting trips to Southern Rhodesia and Northern Rhodesia in 1928 and 1929, followed by Kenya and Mozambique in 1930. She worked with botanists at the Bolus Herbarium of the University of Cape Town to create an important herbarium.

She returned to the Missouri Botanical Garden in 1930, working as its acting curator. She then took her collection to the University of California, Los Angeles where she continued her research. She taught at the San Francisco State College and George Pepperdine College before teaching at the University of Southern California for 23 years. She was the supervisor of science for the Los Angeles County Schools from 1942 to 1952. She retired from teaching in 1965.

She published monographs of the genera Mimulus and Hemimeris L. The standard author abbreviation A.L.Grant is used to indicate this person as the author when citing a botanical name.

== Honors ==
- Graduate Women in Science named its Sigma Delta Epsilon Adele Lewis Grant Fellowship in her honor.
- When the Missouri Botanical Garden was recognized as the North American center for the study of African plants in 1969, her plant collection was moved there.
- Delta Kappa Gamma International created the Dr. Adele Lewis Grant Scholarship of Delta Kappa Gamma.

== Personal life ==
On August 17, 1905, Lewis married George Francis Grant of Tuolumne County, California in Carpinteria. The couple later divorced and had no children.

In March 1917, she made presentations and distributed petitions against the proposed California legislation that would allow hunters to kill beneficial birds that ate insects. She was the founder of the Alpha Pi and the Gamma Kappa (1955) chapters of Delta Kappa Gamma professional society for women educators.

She died after a long illness in a convalescent hospital in Inglewood, California on June 19, 1969.
