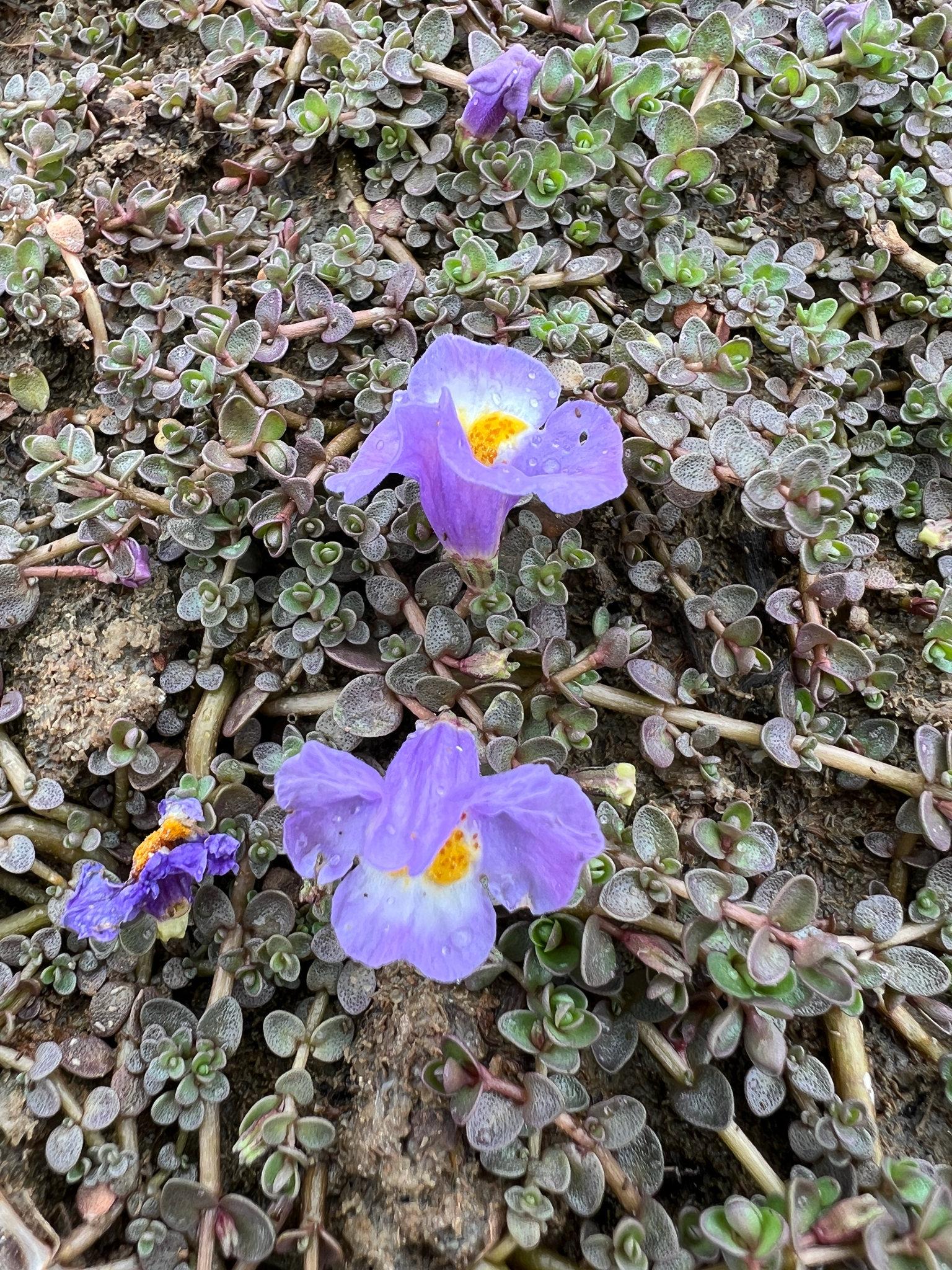

Conservation status
- Naturally Uncommon (NZ TCS)

Scientific classification
- Kingdom: Plantae
- Clade: Tracheophytes
- Clade: Angiosperms
- Clade: Eudicots
- Clade: Asterids
- Order: Lamiales
- Family: Phrymaceae
- Genus: Thyridia; W.R.Barker & Beardsley
- Species: T. repens

Binomial name
- Thyridia repens (R.Br.) W.R.Barker & Beardsley

Synonyms
- Mimulus colensoi Kirk; Mimulus repens R.Br.

= Thyridia repens =

Species of flowering plant

Thyridia repens, with the common names creeping monkeyflower, native musk, purple musk, Māori musk, and native monkey flower, is a herbaceous succulent plant native to New Zealand and Australia that grows as low mats beside the sea. Its flowers are light purple or white.

== Taxonomy ==
Originally described as Mimulus repens by Robert Brown in 1810, this is the only species in the genus Thyridia. A 2002 examination of the large genus Mimulus within the family Phrymaceae found that it was polyphyletic, giving rise to at least six other genera. A 2012 review of the Phrymaceae recognised four main clades, one of them encompassing the Australasian genera Elacholoma, Glossostigma, Microcarpaea, Peplidium, Uvedalia, and a new monotypic genus Thyridia, erected to contain this species.

Thyridia was considered distinct from Mimulus by having ribbed seeds with longitudinal lines; each rib has a row of window-like areolae on either side (the genus name is from the Greek thyris, a small door or window) Because similar seeds are found in some species of Peplidium, and because the molecular evidence for the split was not convincing to all, some authorities argue this species should be retained in Mimulus.

== Description ==
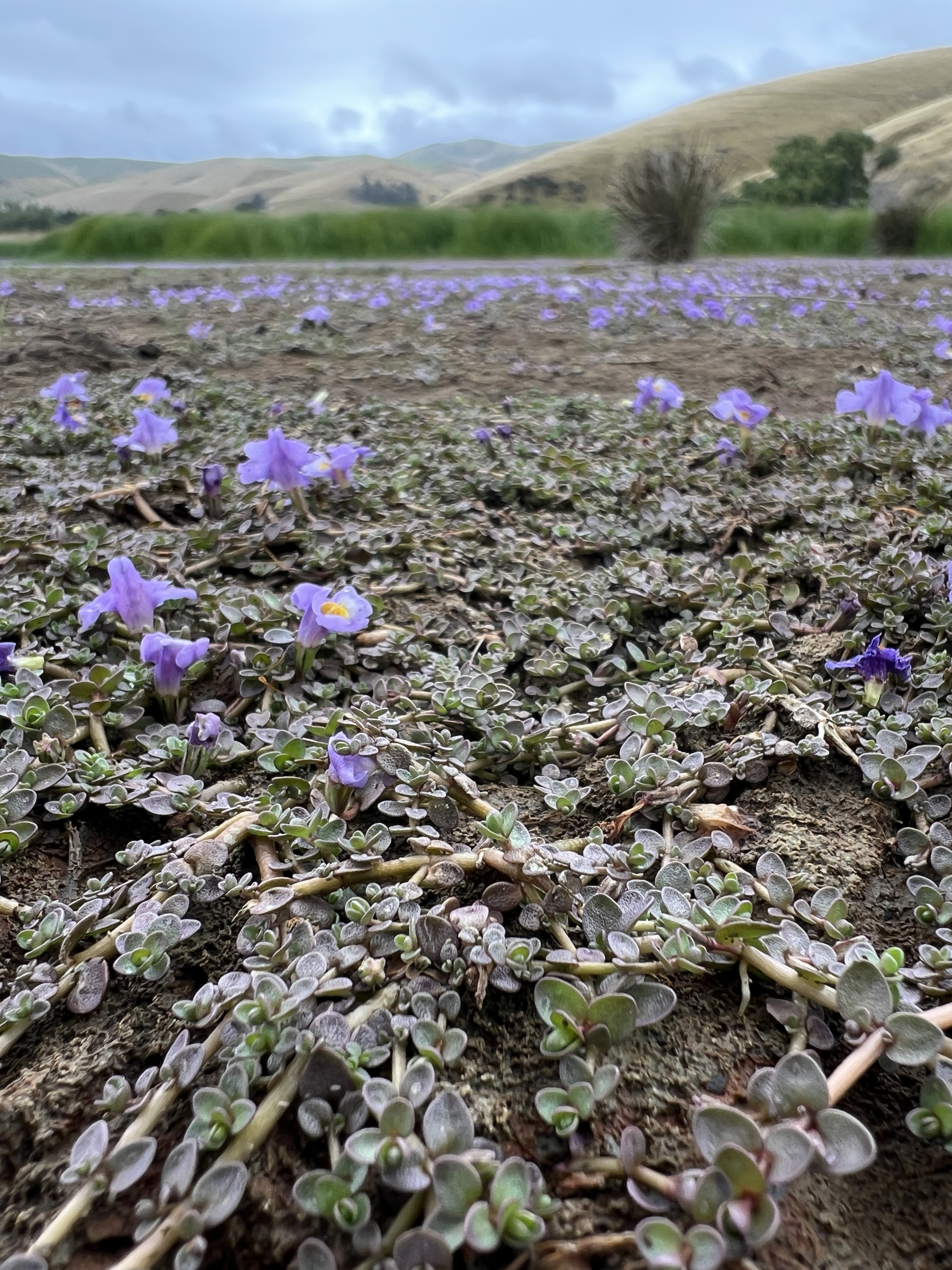
A carpet of Thyridia repens growing at the edge of Kaituna Lagoon, Lake Ellesmere / Te Waihora, New Zealand

Thyridia repens is a low-growing perennial herb with small succulent leaves, which are unstalked, opposite, and greenish-purple covered with tiny pits or dots. The flowers are comparatively large, about 15 mm (0.59 in) across, and either white or pale purple, lilac or mauve. The flowers, which are open for a single day in the field, have conspicuous yellow patches surrounded by white. The seed capsule is cylindrical and about 6.5 mm (0.26 in) long. In a study of T. repens at Lake Ellesmere, the most common pollinators were honey bees and the dronefly Eristalis tenax, followed by native bees Lasioglossum sordidum and Leioproctus, and the syrphid fly Melanostoma fasciatum. T. repens has low creeping branches, rising up to 15 centimetres (5.9 in) especially if the plant is sometimes submerged, and can form a carpet-like colony.

== Habitat ==
This species is found in the North and South Islands of New Zealand, as well as Tasmania and mainland Australia. It is coastal, found usually on muddy or silty flats periodically inundated by high tides. In New Zealand, the species is widely but sparsely distributed and naturally uncommon, especially in the Auckland area (although Thomas Kirk collected the type specimens of its synonym, Mimulus colensoi, at marshes in Onehunga). Resistant to being submerged by salt water, it cannot tolerate taller-growing plants or more vigorous prostrate species, and in some parts of the country is threatened by the spread of the salt grasses Spartina or Carex divisa.
