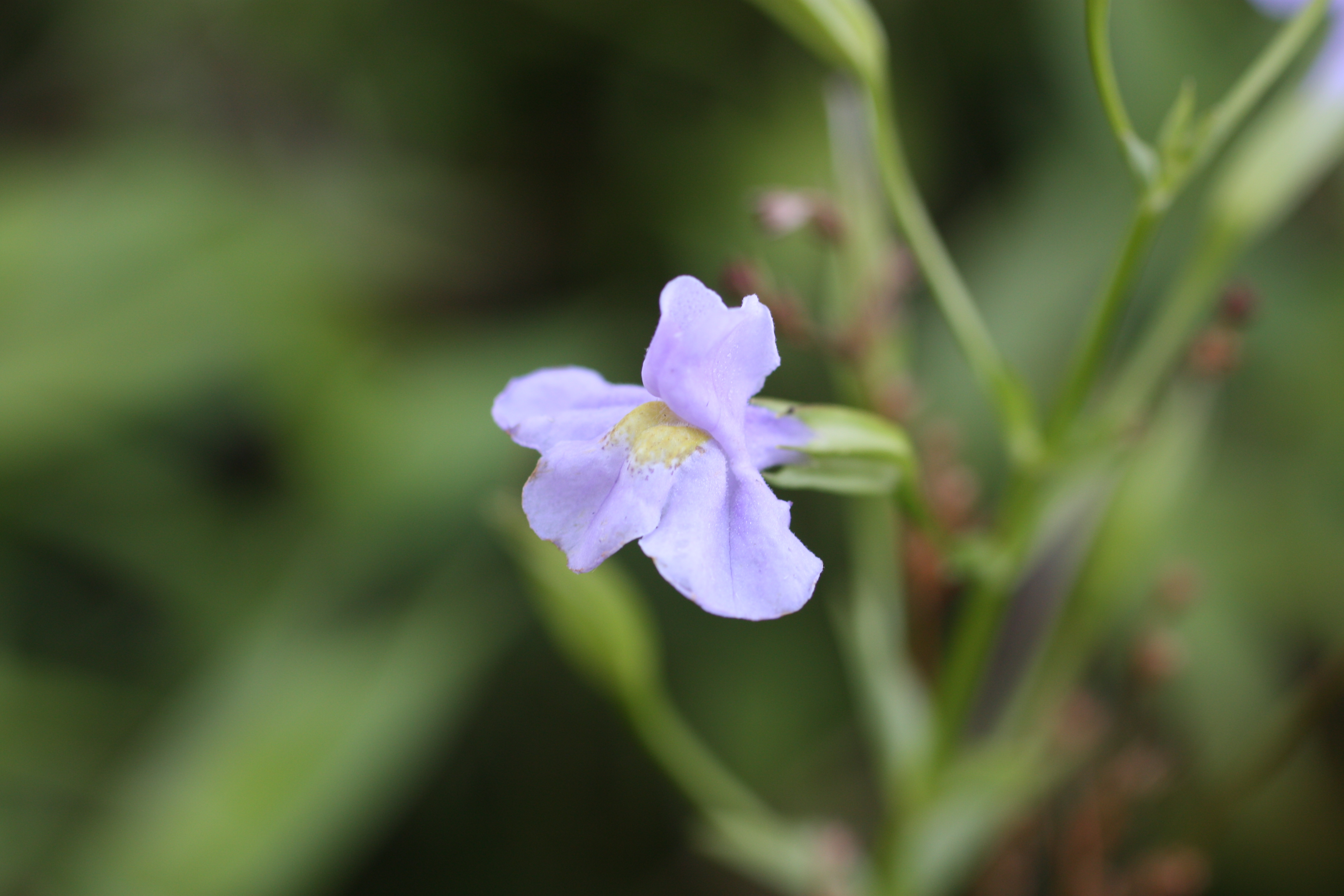
- Mimulus ringens

Scientific classification
- Kingdom: Plantae
- Clade: Embryophytes
- Clade: Tracheophytes
- Clade: Angiosperms
- Clade: Eudicots
- Clade: Asterids
- Order: Lamiales
- Family: Phrymaceae
- Genus: Mimulus; L.

Species
- 7, see text

Synonyms
- Cynorrhynchium Mitch.; Eunanus Benth.; Monavia Adans., nom. illeg. superfl.

= Mimulus =

Genus of flowering plants

Mimulus /ˈmɪmjuːləs/, also known as monkeyflowers, is a plant genus in the family Phrymaceae, which was traditionally placed in family Scrophulariaceae. The genus now contains only seven species, two native to eastern North America and the other five native to Asia, Australia, Africa, or Madagascar. In the past, about 150 species were placed in this genus, most of which have since been assigned to other genera, the majority to genus Erythranthe.

Mimulus species prefer wet or moist areas and are not drought resistant. Several are cultivated as ornamental garden plants. The cultivar 'Highland Red' has received the Royal Horticultural Society's Award of Garden Merit.

== Name ==
Mimulus is based on the Latin word mimus ('mimic', especially in the context of acting). This may have to do with the flowers seeming to have grinning faces resembling those of monkeys.

== Genetics ==
The color patterns of Mimulus flowers are determined by an inverted repeat in the YELLOW UPPER (YUP) genetic locus. YUP causes production of phase-patterned siRNAs that regulate color carotenoids. YUP itself evolved from a fragment of a cytochrome protein unrelated to flower coloration.

== Taxonomy ==
Before the 2012 restructuring, two large groups of species had long been recognized in the genus Mimulus as it was traditionally defined, with the largest group of species in western North America, and a second group with center of diversity in Australia. In the 2012 restructuring of Mimulus by Barker, et al., based largely upon DNA evidence, seven species were left in Mimulus, 111 placed into Erythranthe (species with axile placentation and long pedicels), 46 placed into Diplacus (species with parietal placentation and sessile flowers), two placed in Uvedalia, and one each placed in Elacholoma, Mimetanthe, and Thyridia.

Removal of Mimulus from family Scrophulariaceae has been supported by studies of chloroplast DNA first published in the mid-1990s. Multiple studies of chloroplast DNA and two regions of nuclear rDNA suggest that the genera Phryma, Berendtiella, Hemichaena, Leucocarpus, Microcarpeae, Peplidium, Glossostigma, and Elacholoma are all derived from within Mimulus and would need to be rearranged.

== Species of Mimulus sensu stricto ==
The species remaining in Mimulus are:

- Mimulus alatus Aiton – sharpwing monkey-flower – eastern North America
- Mimulus aquatilis A.R.Bean – Queensland, Australia
- Mimulus gracilis R.Br. – Australia
- Mimulus madagascariensis Benth. – Madagascar
- Mimulus orbicularis Wall. ex Benth. – Bangladesh to Myanmar, central Thailand and Vietnam
- Mimulus ringens L. – Allegheny monkey-flower, square-stemmed monkey-flower – eastern North America
- Mimulus strictus Benth. – Africa, India, and Australia
