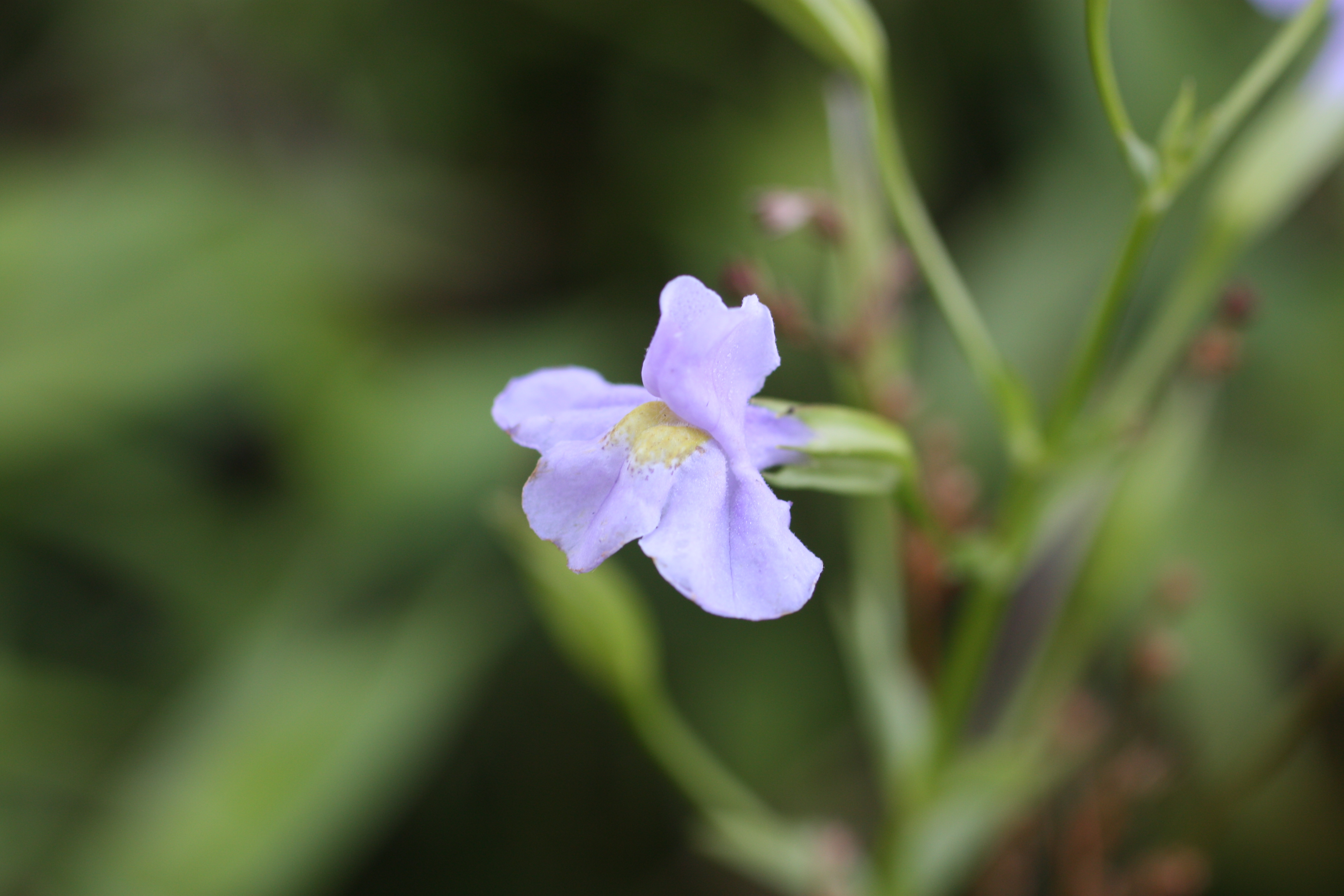

Conservation status
- Least Concern (IUCN 3.1)

- Secure (NatureServe)

Scientific classification
- Kingdom: Plantae
- Clade: Embryophytes
- Clade: Tracheophytes
- Clade: Angiosperms
- Clade: Eudicots
- Clade: Asterids
- Order: Lamiales
- Family: Phrymaceae
- Genus: Mimulus
- Species: M. ringens

Binomial name
- Mimulus ringens L.

Varieties
- M. r. var. colpophilus Fernald; M. r. var. ringens

= Mimulus ringens =

Plant species in the lopseed family

Mimulus ringens is a species of monkeyflower known by the common names Allegheny monkeyflower and square-stemmed monkeyflower.

It is native to eastern and central North America and has been introduced to the Pacific Northwest. It grows in a wide variety of moist to wet habitat types. Seeds are available from commercial suppliers.

This is a rhizomatous perennial growing 20 centimetres (7.9 in) to well over 1 meter (3.3 ft) tall, its 4-angled stem usually erect. The oppositely arranged leaves are lance-shaped to oblong, up to 8 centimetres (3.1 in) long, usually clasping the stem. The sessile leaves of M. ringens help to distinguish it from its eastern relative, Mimulus alatus, which bears leaves on petioles and has a winged stem. The herbage is hairless. The flower is 1–3 inches (2.5–7.6 cm) long, its tubular base encapsulated in a ribbed calyx of sepals with pointed lobes. The flower is lavender, blue, red or pink in color and is divided into an upper lip and a larger, swollen lower lip.

== Taxonomy ==
Mimulus ringens was given its scientific name in 1753 by Carl Linnaeus. It is classified in the family Phrymaceae together with its genus, Mimulus. It has two accepted varieties.

- Mimulus ringens var. colpophilus
  This variety is rare, ecologically restricted, and vulnerable. It is known from Quebec, it has been reported in Vermont, and there are a few occurrences in Maine, where it grows only in freshwater sections of tidal estuaries. This variety is distinguished by having shorter calyces than the ringens variety and by its short flower pedicels, 1–1.7 centimetres (0.39–0.67 in) long versus a length of 2–3.5 centimetres (0.79–1.38 in) in the nominate subspecies. This plant variety faces several threats, but its current status is not known due to a lack of data.
- Mimulus ringens var. ringens
  The autonymic variety has a widespread native range in eastern North America and has also been introduced to Europe. It also has nine heterotypic synonyms.

Table of Synonyms
Name	Year	Rank
Mimulus acutangulus Greene	1909	species
Mimulus minthodes Greene	1909	species
Mimulus pallidus Salisb.	1796	species
Mimulus pteropus Raf.	1817	species
Mimulus ringens f. albiflorus Moldenke	1944	form
Mimulus ringens var. congesta Farw.	1917	variety
Mimulus ringens var. minthodes (Greene) A.L.Grant	1924	variety
Mimulus ringens f. peckii House	1923	form
Mimulus ringens f. roseus Fassett	1943	form
