= Goodenia mimuloides =

Scientific classification
- Kingdom: Plantae
- Clade: Tracheophytes
- Clade: Angiosperms
- Clade: Eudicots
- Clade: Asterids
- Order: Asterales
- Family: Goodeniaceae
- Genus: Goodenia
- Species: G. mimuloides

Binomial name
- Goodenia mimuloides S.Moore

Species of plant

Goodenia mimuloides is a species of flowering plant in the family Goodeniaceae and is endemic to inland areas of Western Australia. It is a low-lying to ascending, densely hairy herb, with narrow egg-shaped, toothed or lobed leaves, and racemes of yellow flowers.

== Description ==
Goodenia mimuloides is a low-lying to ascending herb, growing to a height of up to 40 cm (16 in) and densely covered with woolly hairs. The leaves at the base of the plant are narrow oblong with the narrower end towards the base, 40–100 mm (1.6–3.9 in) long and 4–20 mm (0.16–0.79 in) wide with toothed or deeply lobed edges. The flowers are arranged in racemes up to 80 mm (3.1 in) long with leaf-like bracts, the individual flowers on pedicels 50–100 mm (2.0–3.9 in) long. The sepals are narrow oblong, 2–5 mm (0.079–0.197 in) long, the corolla yellow, 12–25 mm (0.47–0.98 in) long and hairy inside. The lower lobes of the corolla are 4–7 mm (0.16–0.28 in) long with wings 2–3.5 mm (0.079–0.138 in) wide. Flowering occurs from June to October and the fruit is a more or less spherical capsule 4–7 mm (0.16–0.28 in) in diameter.

== Taxonomy and naming ==
Goodenia mimuloides was first formally described in 1897 by Spencer Le Marchant Moore in the Journal of Botany, British and Foreign. The specific epithet (mimuloides) means "Mimulus-like".

== Distribution and habitat ==
This goodenia grows in mallee and open woodland in inland areas of Western Australia between Carnarvon and the Goldfields region.

== Conservation status ==
Goodenia mimuloides is classified as "not threatened" by the Government of Western Australia Department of Parks and Wildlife.
