= Possil Marsh =

Nature reserve in Glasgow, Scotland

Coordinates: 55.90255°N 4.26424°W

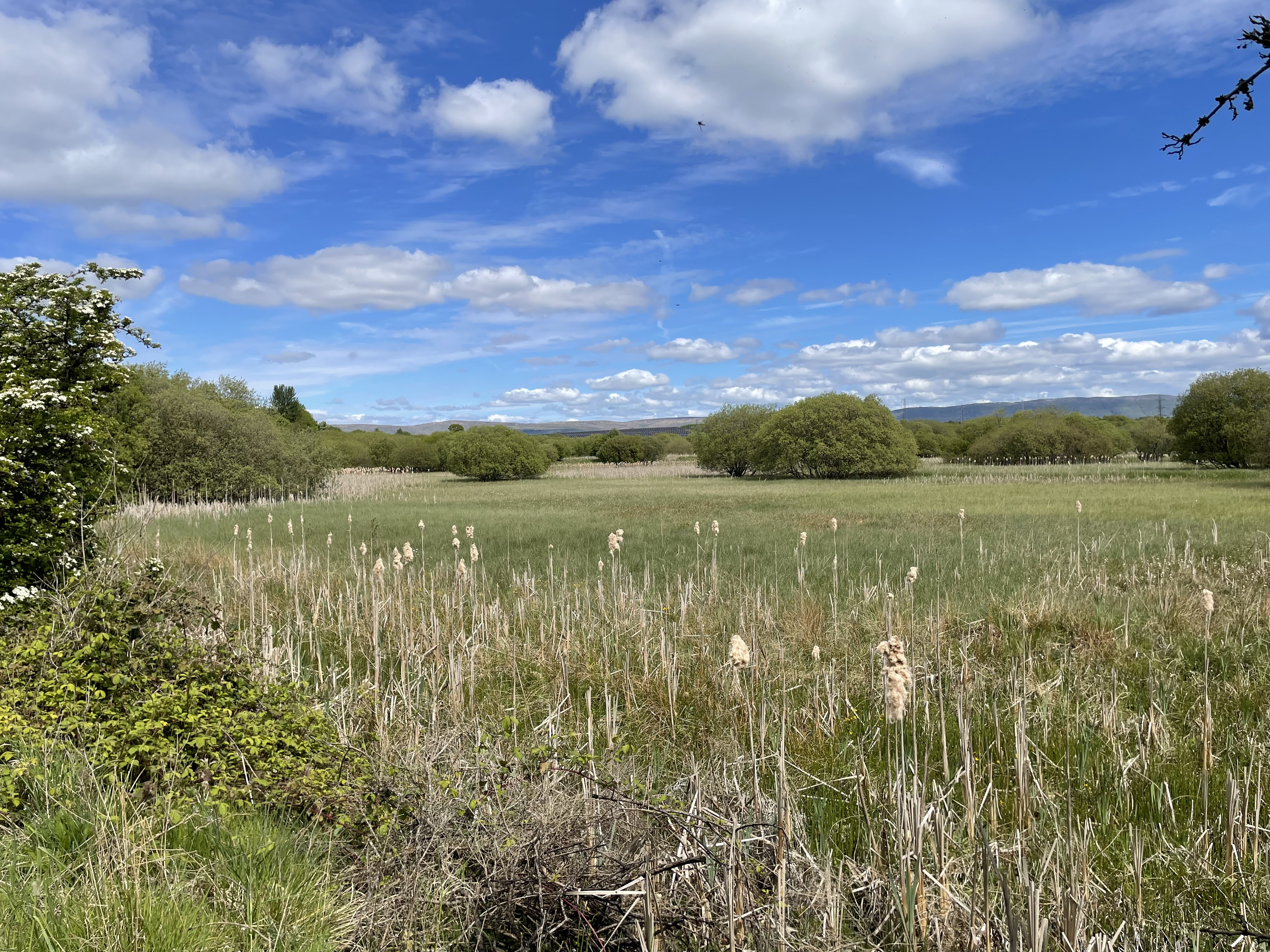
- Possil Marsh, looking north from South-West side, May 2026
- Interactive map of Possil Marsh
- Location: Glasgow
- Governing body: Scottish Wildlife Trust
- Website: https://scottishwildlifetrust.org.uk/reserve/possil-marsh/

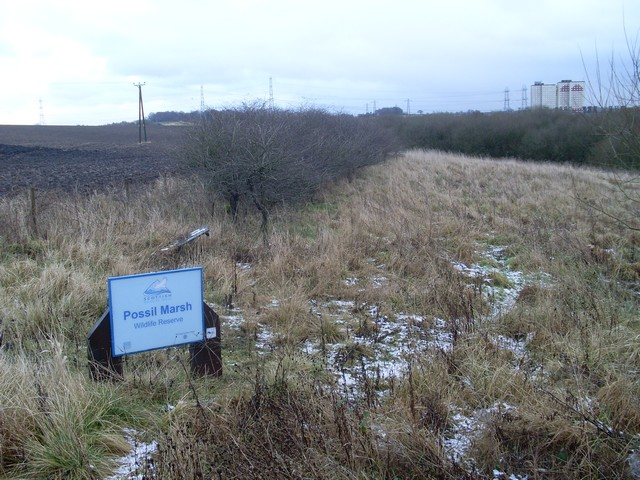
Possil Marsh Wildlife Reserve, 2009

Possil Marsh is a nature reserve and Site of Special Scientific Interest, of both flora and fauna, within the city of Glasgow, Scotland. The reserve was once part of an extensive system of lochs and marshes which extended throughout much of lowland West Central Scotland. However, centuries of drainage and reclamation have resulted in the elimination of much of this system. Due to its geographic position, the marsh is particularly vulnerable from industrial and residential development. The reserve contains a monument for the High Possil meteorite, which fell there in 1804.

== Geography ==
The reserve is 31.4 hectares (78 acres) in size, and lies in the catchment of the River Kelvin at 50m above sea level, adjacent to High Possil and Lambhill on the north side of Glasgow. Occupying a natural basin of fluvio-glacial origin between the River Clyde and the Kelvin, the site is roughly triangular in shape. Its northern border is bounded by Lochfauld Farm, whilst the south and eastern borders are protected from direct contact with industrial and residential areas by the Forth and Clyde Canal, as is the western border by the A879 and Lambhill Cemetery.

== Status ==
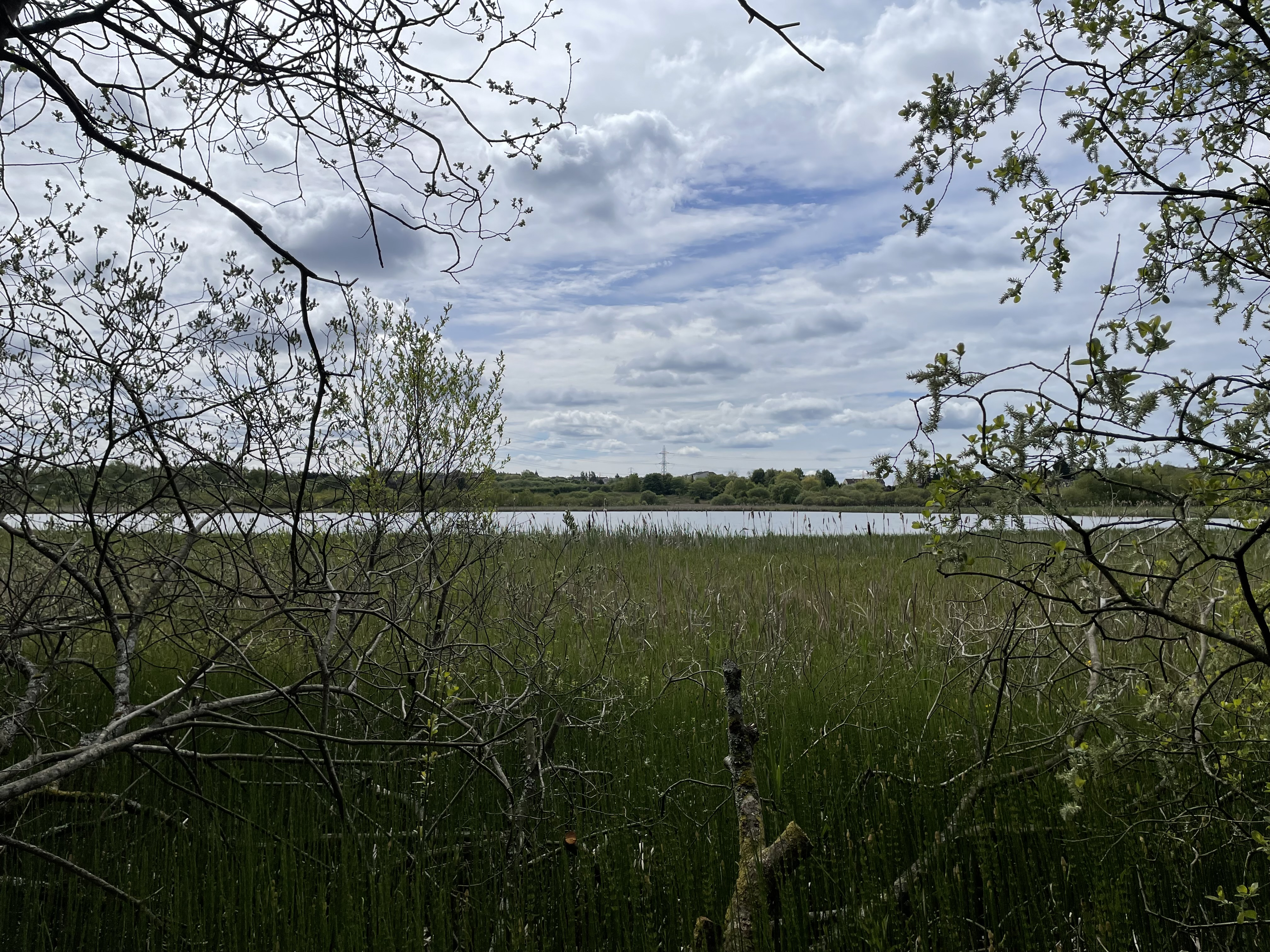
Possil Loch, 2026

Possil Marsh has been under the custodianship of the Scottish Wildlife Trust since 1982, when it was acquired as a gift. Prior to this it had been managed by the Scottish Society for the Protection of Wild Birds, on behalf of the Scottish Wild Birds Sanctuaries Trust, since 1950. This management, and subsequent protection, has resulted in little alteration within the site in the past 50 years. Due to its importance, the marsh was first notified as a Site of Special Scientific Interest (SSSI) in 1954. Subsequently, it was then designated a bird sanctuary under Wild Bird Statutory Instrument 1956 No 333 (S10). Following the Wildlife and Countryside Act 1981, the bird sanctuary was redesignated under Wild Birds (Possil Marsh Sanctuary Glasgow) Amendment Order 1983. At present the reserve has multiple occupation – 4 owners, 2 occupiers, 1 owner/occupier. It also has British Trust for Ornithology status and district importance for wintering wildfowl, and its diversity of wintering birds, supporting up to 150 bird species, with 22 species recorded breeding. In addition to this it also contains a diverse number of invertebrate fauna, including 2 nationally scarce species and a number of locally scarce species, as well as many important plant species.

== Important habitats ==
The reserve consists of a shallow mesotrophic loch, covering roughly 15% of the total site, with extensive fen (10 hectares (25 acres)) and swamp (6 hectares (15 acres)) 45-50%, damp grassland 15%, dry meadow 10%, and birch and willow scrubland 15%. Within the site there are a number of vegetation communities including Typha latifolia beds, Potentilla palustris meadows and Carex rostrata swamps. These fen/swamp habitat communities are the largest remaining areas of their type within the district, and also include limited areas of Carex diandra fen (locally rare). Other notable areas of interest include the dry grassland/heath habitat and the central birch island which contains an important number of sphagnum species.

=== Notable flora ===
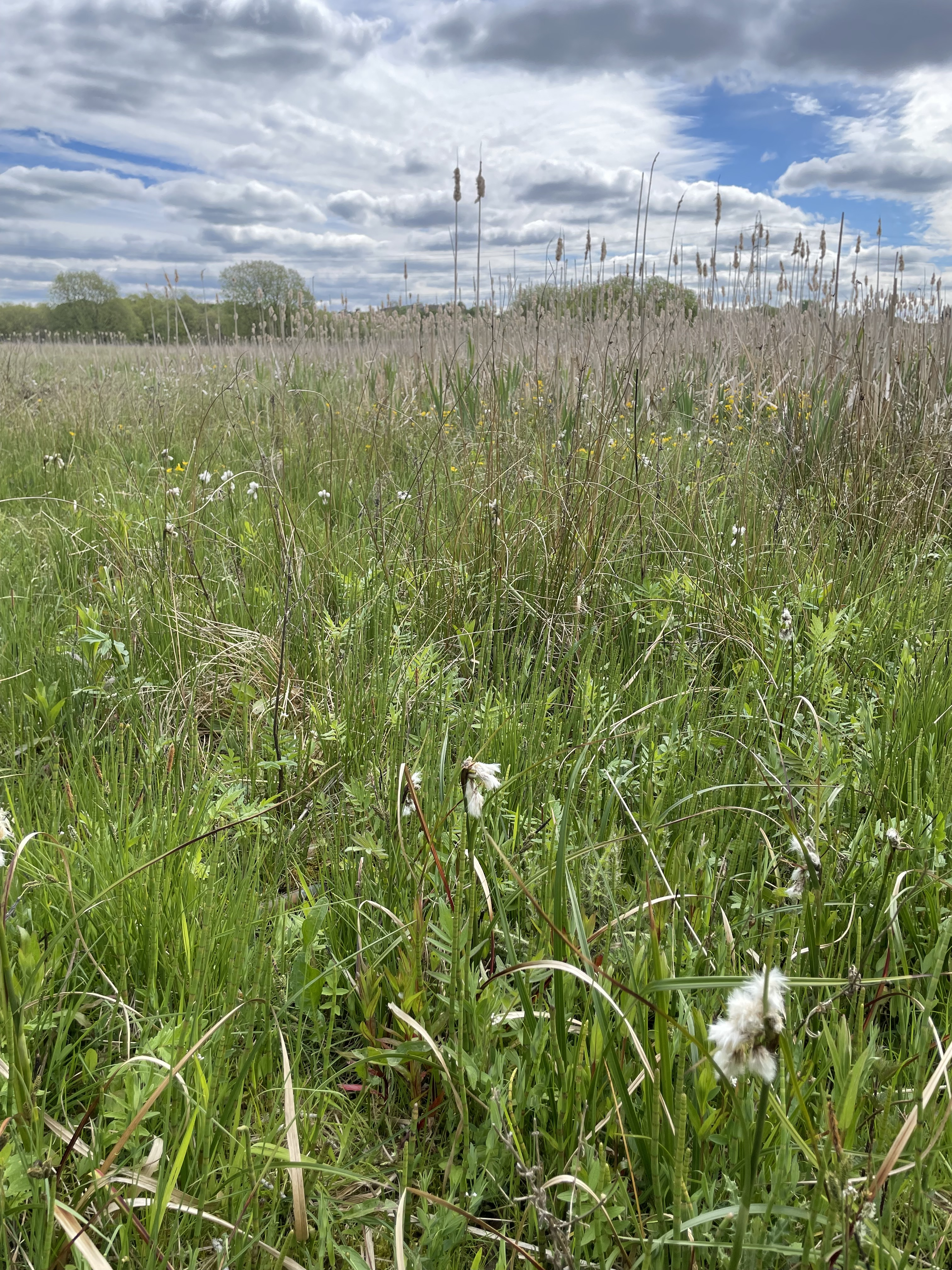
Cotton grass and bulrush at Possil Marsh

Plants that are of local and/or national importance include: Lysimachia thyrsiflora (nationally scarce), Sphagnum riparium (nationally scarce), Sphagnum magellanicum (locally rare), C.diandra (locally rare), and Lemna triscula (rare in Scotland). Many of the species which are firmly established within the reserve have either been deliberately introduced, such as Berula erecta, Chamerion angustifolium, and Ranunculus bulbosus, or have been accidentally introduced, such as L. thyrsiflora, Mimulus luteus, Urtricularia minor, and Elodea canadensis, from the adjacent canal. Other species, such as Ranunculus scleratus, entered the marsh due to material being brought in to level up the ground for a cottage that once stood within the reserve.

=== Species lost ===
Past land use, natural succession and human activities have played a role in changing the reserve's vegetation. This has resulted in the loss of species such as Agrostemma githago, Apium inundatum, Armoracia rusticana, Asplenium adainatum-nigrum, Astrantia major, Baldellia ranunculoides, Barbarea verna, Campanula rotundifolia, Ceratophylum demersum, Ceterach Officinarum, Drosera rotundifolia, Gnaphalium sylvaticum, Humulus lupulus, Hypericum humifusum, Lemna gibba, Mimulus luteus, Narthecium ossifragum, Oenanthe crocata, Ophioglossum vulgatum, Parnassia palustris, Pyrola minor, Radiola linoides, Ranunculus ficaria, R. hederaceus, Rorippa amphibia, Sagina nodosa, Sagittaria sagittifolia, Salix repans, Utricularia intermedia, and U. vulgaris, all of which are now believed to be absent.
