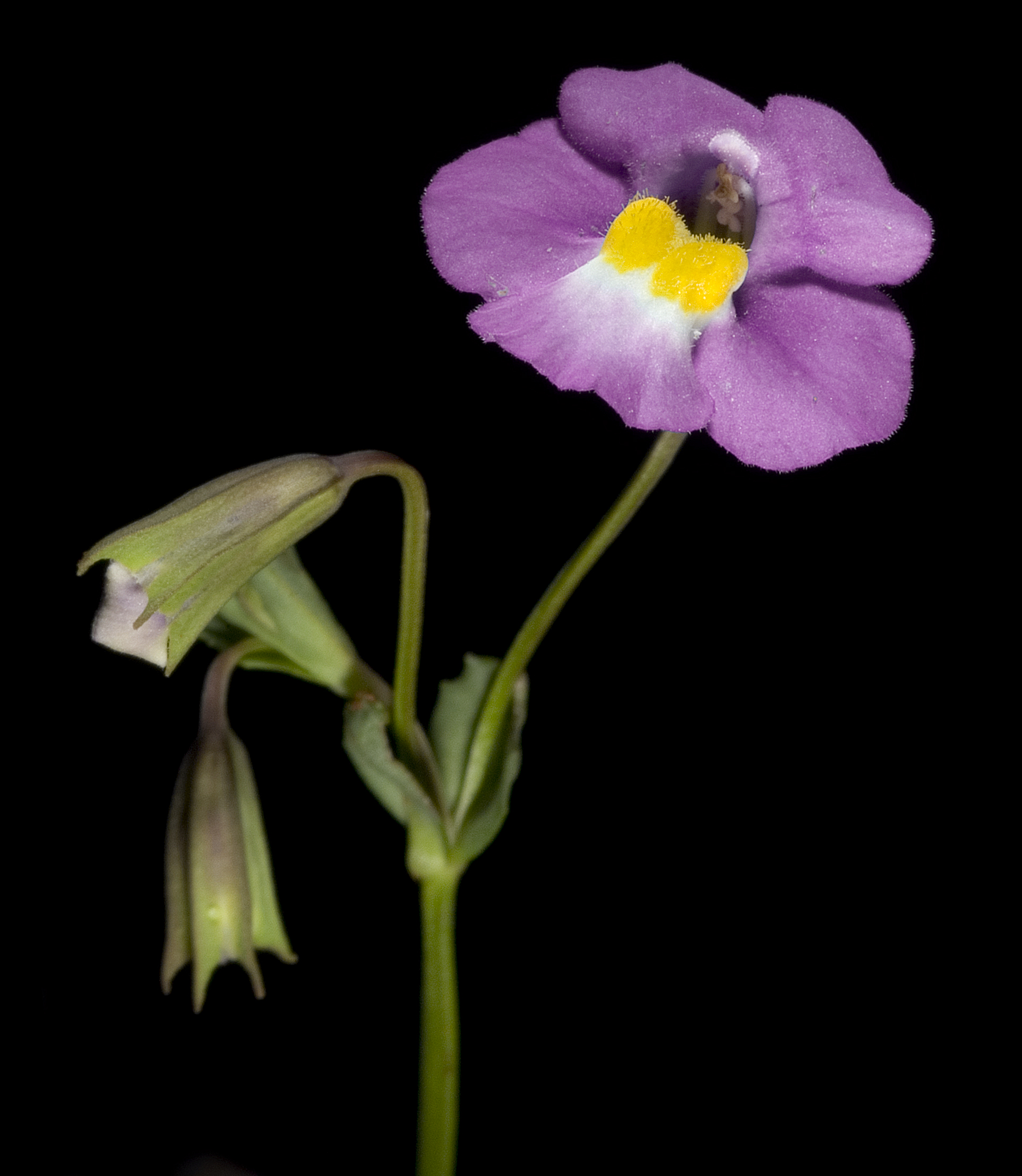

Conservation status
- Least Concern (IUCN 3.1)

Scientific classification
- Kingdom: Plantae
- Clade: Embryophytes
- Clade: Tracheophytes
- Clade: Angiosperms
- Clade: Eudicots
- Clade: Asterids
- Order: Lamiales
- Family: Phrymaceae
- Genus: Mimulus
- Species: M. gracilis

Binomial name
- Mimulus gracilis R.Br.

Synonyms
- Mimulus angustifolius Hochst. ex A.Rich.; Mimulus pusillus Benth.

= Mimulus gracilis =

slender monkey flower

Species of flowering plant

Mimulus gracilis the slender monkey flower is a species of monkey flower found in Africa and Australia.

In Australia it is found in all mainland states, in low areas after flooding, near claypans, swamps and creeks.
