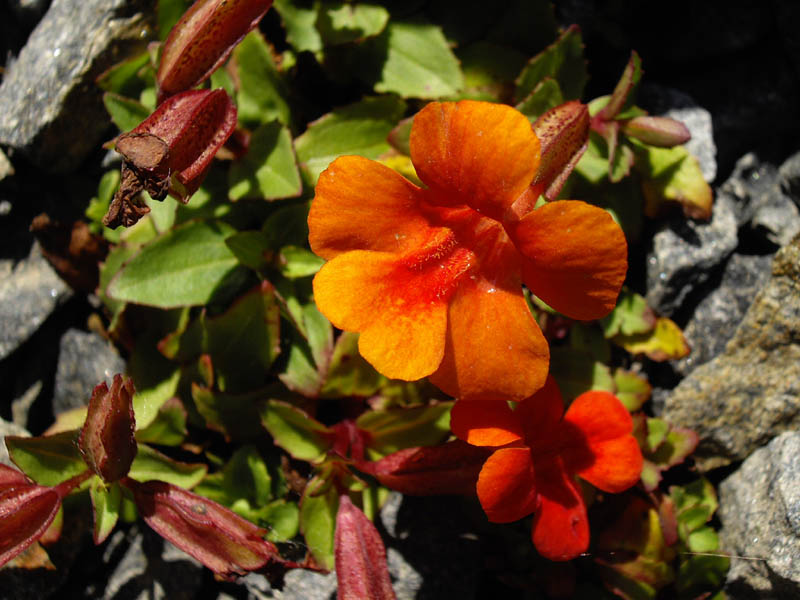

Scientific classification
- Kingdom: Plantae
- Clade: Tracheophytes
- Clade: Angiosperms
- Clade: Eudicots
- Clade: Asterids
- Order: Lamiales
- Family: Phrymaceae
- Genus: Erythranthe
- Species: E. cuprea

Binomial name
- Erythranthe cuprea (Dombrain) G.L.Nesom

Synonyms
- Mimulus cupreus Dombrain

= Erythranthe cuprea =

Species of flowering plant

Erythranthe cuprea is a species of monkeyflower also known by the common name flor de cobre (Eng: copper flower). It was formerly known as Mimulus cupreus. Its characteristics in nectar and petal shape are markedly different from other species in this genus found in Chile.

== Distribution ==
Erythranthe cuprea is endemic to central and southern Chile with wet locales such as riverbanks. Several commercial cultivars are available: 'Fire Dragon', 'Fire King', 'Highland Red', 'Inshriach Crimson', 'Plymtree', 'Red Emperor', 'Scarlet Bay', 'Scarlet Bee', 'Whitecroft Scarlet' and 'Wisley Red'. Many of these cultivars are hybrids with Erythranthe lutea or Erythranthe guttata.

== Description ==
Similar to E. lutea but of a short life span, Erythranthe cuprea has atypical flower coloring, being coppery-orange to coppery-red, whereas most monkey-flowers are yellow or red, though occasional yellow morphs are found. This does not affect pollination by bees and E. cuprea possesses a high degree of self-pollination. Leaves have teeth and are oval. The plant grows to about 20–30 centimeters (7.9–11.8 in) in height and flowers are 4 centimeters (1.6 in) in length. Flowering occurs in the summer.

== Phytochemistry ==
Petal-color polymorphism is controlled by a single locus; petal and dorsal coloring is co-inherited, indicating single or linked control. The red-copper color of the flowers is caused by a water-soluble pigment, cyanidin, which is an anthocyanin, acquired through a gain-of-function mutation. An unusual feature is that a similar mutation in a different gene has occurred in E. lutea, but "the loci are related through duplication."

== Cultivation ==
This short-lived perennial is cultivated as an ornamental, and is often treated as an annual. In the horticultural literature it is still referred to as Mimulus cupreus. The cultivar 'Whitecroft Scarlet' has gained the Royal Horticultural Society's Award of Garden Merit. It requires a sheltered spot in reliably moist soil, preferring partial shade.
