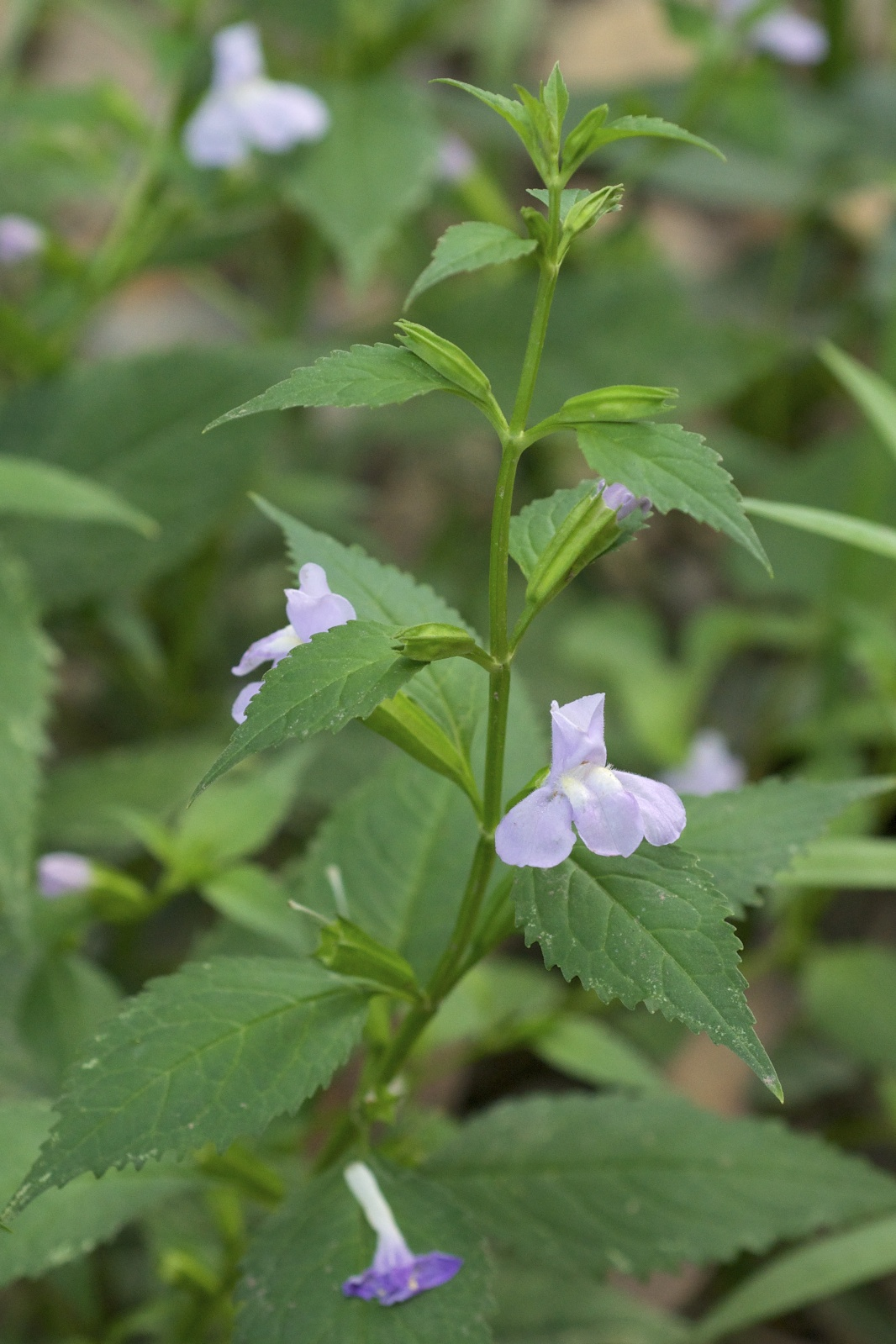

Conservation status
- Least Concern (IUCN 3.1)

- Secure (NatureServe)

Scientific classification
- Kingdom: Plantae
- Clade: Embryophytes
- Clade: Tracheophytes
- Clade: Angiosperms
- Clade: Eudicots
- Clade: Asterids
- Order: Lamiales
- Family: Phrymaceae
- Genus: Mimulus
- Species: M. alatus

Binomial name
- Mimulus alatus Aiton
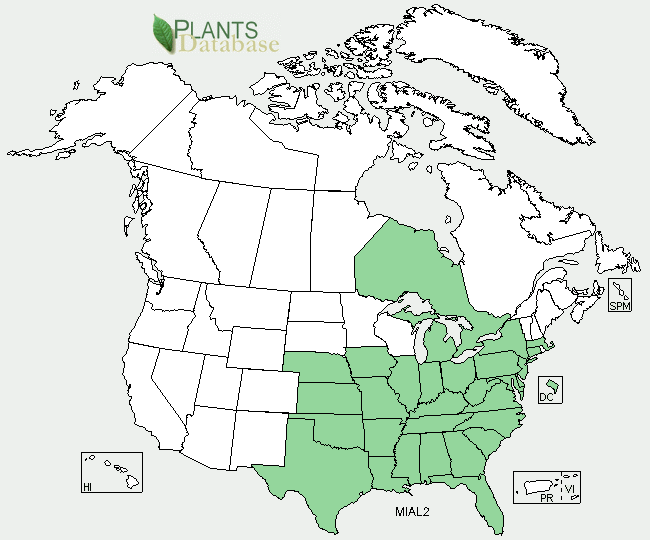
- Distribution of Mimulus alatus in the United States

= Mimulus alatus =

Species of flowering plant

Mimulus alatus, the sharpwing monkeyflower, is an herbaceous eudicot perennial that has no floral scent. It is native to North America and its blooming season is from June to September. The flowering plant has green foliage and blue to violet flowers. It has a short life span compared to most other plants and a rapid growth rate. Like other monkey-flowers of the genus Mimulus, M. alatus grows best in wet to moist conditions and has a bilabiate corolla, meaning it is two-lipped. The arrangement of the upper and lower lip petals suggests a monkey’s face. The winged stems together with the monkey face give the plant its common name.

== Taxonomy ==
The genus Mimulus has been removed from Scrophulariaceae and placed in the family Phrymaceae. In the 1990s, DNA sequences from chloroplast and nuclear genomes showed that Mimulus is not monophyletic; Glossostigma, Peplidium, Phryma, Leucocarpus, Hemichaena, and Berendtiella are all derived from Mimulus. As a result, Mimulus and its derived genera have been placed into the subfamily Phrymoideae and the family Phrymaceae.

== Distribution ==
Mimulus alatus is a native species to eastern North America; its range stretches from Connecticut, down south to Florida and extends as far west as Nebraska and Texas. It is most commonly found in central and lower Mississippi valley, and considered rare in Connecticut, Iowa, Massachusetts, Nebraska, New Jersey, New York and Ontario.

== Habitat ==
The sharp wing monkey-flower is a perennial that grows best under partial sun exposure and wet to moist conditions. It has been found in a variety of wetland types such as edges of small rivers, swamps, shady stream banks, wet woods, marshes, wet meadows, ditches, springs, etc. Full sun is tolerable but when it is grown in habitats that are too dry and sunny, the sharp wing monkey-flower remains small in size and becomes yellowish green. During its season it can endure occasional flooding and foliar disease is infrequent. It prefers a slightly acidic to neutral soil pH of 5.6-7.5 that contains plenty of organic matter. Temperatures below -23 °F are not survivable.

== Morphology ==
Individuals of this species can range from 15 cm to 91 cm in height, depending on growth conditions. Its root system consists of taproot and thick rhizomes. The flowers are bisexual and bilaterally symmetrical, and most commonly blue to violet. It has erect, hollow, smooth, square (4-angled) stems that sometimes branch off. There are also thin wings along the angles of the stem.

The glabrous opposite leaves in a decussate arrangement are noticeably toothed (dentate to serrate) and are up to 12 cm long and 5 cm wide. They are ovate, lanceolate-ovate, or lanceolate, gradually narrowing to a sharp point at the apex. At the base are narrowly winged petioles about 1.2 cm long.

== Flowers ==
Flowers occur individually and are 2.5 cm long. Only a few flowers on the same plant are in bloom during the June to September season. The two-lipped corolla is borne from 5 mm pedicels from the upper leaf axils. At the center, or throat, of the corolla is a yellow region surrounded by a band of white; the yellow beard guides pollinators towards the flower. The upper lip consists of a pair of lobes that fold backwards to the side and the lower lip has three rounded lobes that spread outward and serve as a welcoming platform for pollinating insects. Unlike the stems and leaves, the flowers are not glabrous as they have fine white hairs on the surface of the corolla. The 1.7 cm long, tubular five-parted calyx has five teeth alongside its outer rim. When the corolla falls off, the calyx surrounds a 1 cm capsule that contains many conspicuous black seeds. Collected seeds have successfully germinated indoors. At the base of the 1.5 cm corolla tube are four stamens – one short and one long pair. There is a 6 mm long, bilocular, light green, oval shaped ovary. White filaments are 6–7 mm long, with brownish 1.3 mm anthers. There is a white glabrous style of 7 mm long and two flattened stigmas.

== Pollination ==
Bumblebees (such as the Bombus pensylvanicus) are attracted to the nectar of the flowers and are the primary pollinators. Leaves of the plant are eaten by the caterpillars of the moth Elaphria chalcedonia. Butterflies and birds are also visitors to the sharp wing monkey-flower but there has been very little data collected for its floral-faunal relationships.

== Similar species ==
At first glance Mimulus alatus is often confused with Mimulus ringens, or the square-stemmed monkey-flower, because M. alatus occurs in several of the same habitats that M. ringens does. However, close examination of the two monkey-flowers can help differentiate them. M. ringens has sessile leaves (no petiole) and pedicels that are greater than 1.2 cm in length, whereas M. alatus have winged petioles and its pedicels are much shorter than 1.2 cm. The flowers of M. ringens are borne on pedicels longer than its calyx and for M. alatus, it is the opposite – its pedicels are shorter than its calyx. The leaves of M. ringens are weakly toothed and stems unnoticeably winged. Also, it is noted that M. ringens can tolerate wider ranges of habitat conditions whereas M. alatus is more conservative.
