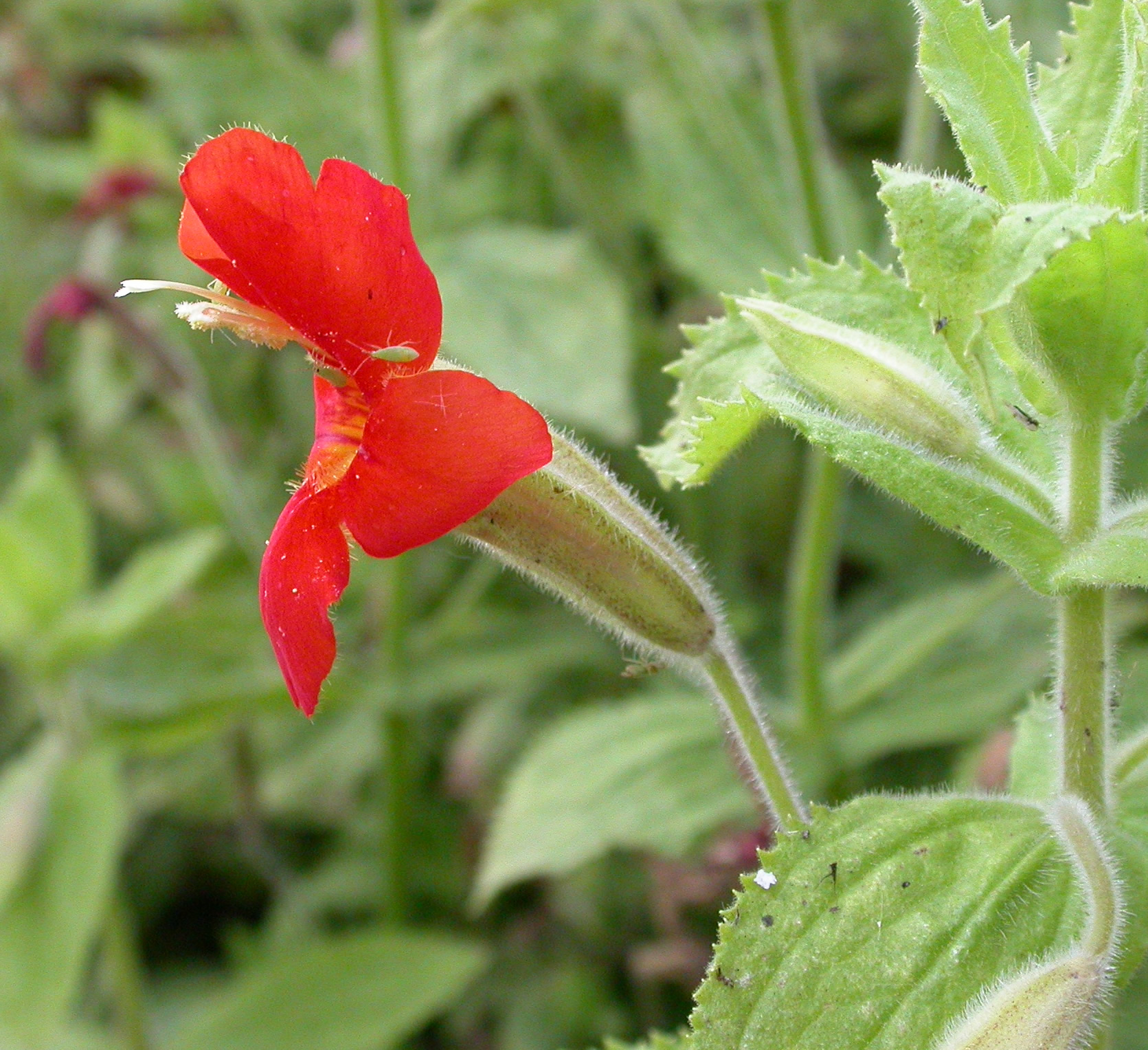

Conservation status
- Secure (NatureServe)

Scientific classification
- Kingdom: Plantae
- Clade: Tracheophytes
- Clade: Angiosperms
- Clade: Eudicots
- Clade: Asterids
- Order: Lamiales
- Family: Phrymaceae
- Genus: Erythranthe
- Species: E. cardinalis

Binomial name
- Erythranthe cardinalis (Dougl. ex Benth.) Spach

Synonyms
- Diplacus cardinalis (Douglas ex Benth.) Groenland; Mimulus cardinalis Douglas ex Benth.; Mimulus cardinalis var. exsul Greene; Mimulus cardinalis var. griseus Greene; Mimulus cardinalis var. rigens Greene; Mimulus maclainianus (J.Harrison) Paxton; Mimulus roseus var. maclainianus J.Harrison; Mimulus rubina Ysabeau

= Erythranthe cardinalis =

Species of flowering plant

Erythranthe cardinalis, the scarlet monkeyflower, is a flowering perennial in the family Phrymaceae. Together with other species in Mimulus section Erythranthe, it serves as a model system for studying pollinator-based reproductive isolation. It was formerly known as Mimulus cardinalis.

== Description ==
Erythranthe cardinalis is a perennial herb that grows 1–3 feet (30–91 cm) tall. It is a fairly large, spreading, attractive plant which bears strongly reflexed, nectar-rich red or orange-red flowers and toothed, downy leaves. It is native to Washington, Oregon, California, and Nevada on the West Coast of the United States and to Cedros Island in Baja California, and is generally found in moist areas at low to middle elevations. Occasional populations of yellow-flowered Erythranthe cardinalis (which lack anthocyanin pigments in their corollas) are found in the wild.

== Cultivation ==
Erythranthe cardinalis is cultivated in the horticulture trade and widely available as an ornamental plant for: traditional gardens; natural landscape, native plant, and habitat gardens; and various types of municipal, commercial, and agency sustainable landscape projects. Cultivars come in a range of colors between yellow and red, including the "Santa Cruz Island Gold" variety, originally collected from Santa Cruz Island off the coast of California.

In the UK it has gained the Royal Horticultural Society's Award of Garden Merit. A short-lived perennial, it is often grown as an annual. It requires a wet, poorly-drained soil in full sun or partial shade.

== Pollination ==
Its blooms and large nectar load attract hummingbirds, whose foreheads serve as the pollen transfer surface between flowers. In the area where it overlaps with its sister species, Erythranthe lewisii, reproductive isolation is maintained mainly through pollinator preference.
