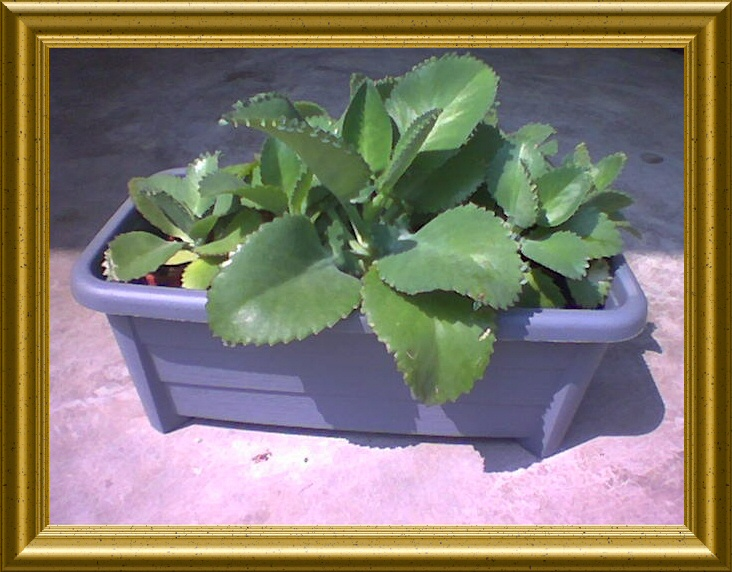
- Cyrtandromoea grandis

Scientific classification
- Kingdom: Plantae
- Clade: Tracheophytes
- Clade: Angiosperms
- Clade: Eudicots
- Clade: Asterids
- Order: Lamiales
- Family: Phrymaceae
- Genus: Cyrtandromoea; Zoll.

Species
- See text.

Synonyms
- Busea Miq.

= Cyrtandromoea =

Genus of flowering plants

Cyrtandromoea is a genus of flowering plants belonging to the family Phrymaceae. For a considerable time, the family placement of the genus remained uncertain; it was placed in either Gesneriaceae or Scrophulariaceae. A molecular phylogenetic study published in 2019 showed that it belonged in Phrymaceae.

Its native range is Southern Central China to Indo-China and Western Malesia.

Species:

- Cyrtandromoea angustifolia (Miq.) C.B.Clarke
- Cyrtandromoea decurrens (Blume) Zoll.
- Cyrtandromoea dispar C.B.Clarke
- Cyrtandromoea grandiflora C.B.Clarke
- Cyrtandromoea grandis Ridl.
- Cyrtandromoea megaphylla Hemsl.
- Cyrtandromoea miqueliana C.B.Clarke
- Cyrtandromoea nicobarica N.P.Balakr.
- Cyrtandromoea pterocaulis D.D.Tao, X.D.Li & X.Yang
- Cyrtandromoea subintegra C.B.Clarke
- Cyrtandromoea subsessilis (Miq.) B.L.Burtt
- Cyrtandromoea sudhansui Chowlu, A.Shenoy & Nuraliev
- Cyrtandromoea sumatrana Ridl.
