= Mimulicalyx =

Scientific classification
- Kingdom: Plantae
- Clade: Tracheophytes
- Clade: Angiosperms
- Clade: Eudicots
- Clade: Asterids
- Order: Lamiales
- Family: Phrymaceae
- Genus: Mimulicalyx; P.C.Tsoong

Genus of plants

Mimulicalyx is a genus of flowering plants belonging to the family Phrymaceae.

Its native range is China.

Species:

- Mimulicalyx paludigenus P.C.Tsoong
- Mimulicalyx rosulatus P.C.Tsoong
