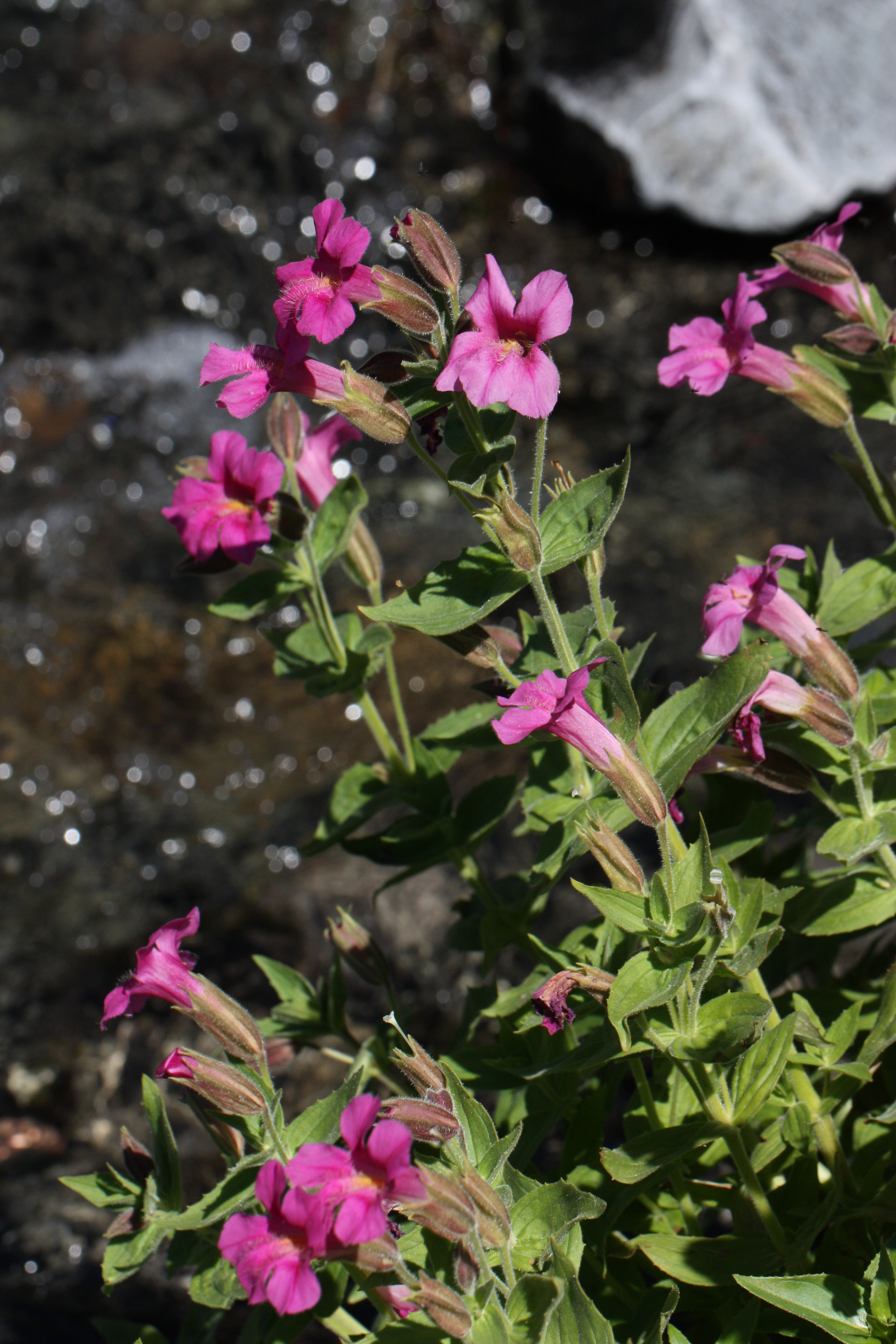
- Erythranthe lewisii in Mount Rainier National Park

Conservation status
- Least Concern (IUCN 3.1)

- Secure (NatureServe)

Scientific classification
- Kingdom: Plantae
- Clade: Embryophytes
- Clade: Tracheophytes
- Clade: Angiosperms
- Clade: Eudicots
- Clade: Asterids
- Order: Lamiales
- Family: Phrymaceae
- Genus: Erythranthe
- Species: E. lewisii

Binomial name
- Erythranthe lewisii (Pursh) G.L.Nesom & N.S.Fraga

Synonyms
- Erythranthe lewisii f. alba (J.K.Henry) Dawn Edwards; Mimulus lewisii Pursh; Mimulus lewisii f. albus (J.K.Henry) B.Boivin; Mimulus lewisii var. albus J.K.Henry; Mimulus lewisii var. exsertus J.M.Coult. & Fisher; Mimulus lewisii f. leuceruthrus E.Hardin; Mimulus lewisii f. tetonensis (A.Nelson) J.F.Macbr. & Payson; Mimulus lewisii var. tetonensis A.Nelson; Mimulus roseus Douglas ex Lindl.; Mimulus roseus var. glabrior Hook

= Erythranthe lewisii =

Plant species in the lopseed family

Erythranthe lewisii (Lewis' monkeyflower, great purple monkeyflower) is a perennial plant in the family Phrymaceae. It is named in honor of explorer Meriwether Lewis. Together with other species in Erythranthe, it serves as a model system for studying pollinator-based reproductive isolation. It was formerly known as Mimulus lewisii.

== Description ==
Erythranthe lewisii is a perennial herb, with stem length ranging from 25 to 80 cm and individual leaves ranging from 20 to 70 mm. The vegetative tissue is covered with fine hairs. The flowers are medium in size, set on fairly long (30–70 mm) pedicels, and range in color from pale pink (generally found in the Sierra Nevada populations, sometimes separated as Erythranthe erubescens G.L.Nesom) to dark magenta (more common in the Cascade Range and Rocky Mountains populations), with a central pair of carotenoid-rich yellow nectar guides covered in trichomes on the lower lobe of the corolla. Occasional populations of white-flowered individuals (which do not express anthocyanin pigments in the corolla) are known.

== Taxonomy ==
Erythranthe lewisii was given it the scientific name Mimulus lewisii in 1813 by Frederick Traugott Pursh. It was moved to the genus Erythranthe in 2012 by Guy L. Nesom and Naomi Fraga. Together with its genus it is classified in the family Phrymaceae. It has no accepted varieties, but it has nine synonyms according to Plants of the World Online.

Table of Synonyms
Name	Year	Rank	Notes
Mimulus lewisii Pursh	1813	species	≡ hom.
Mimulus lewisii var. albus J.K.Henry	1915	variety	= het.
Mimulus lewisii f. albus (J.K.Henry) B.Boivin	1966	form	= het.
Mimulus lewisii var. exsertus J.M.Coult. & Fisher	1893	variety	= het.
Mimulus lewisii f. leuceruthrus E.Hardin	1929	form	= het.
Mimulus lewisii var. tetonensis A.Nelson	1902	variety	= het.
Mimulus lewisii f. tetonensis (A.Nelson) J.F.Macbr. & Payson	1917	form	= het.
Mimulus roseus Douglas ex Lindl.	1833	species	= het.
Mimulus roseus var. glabrior Hook.	1838	variety	= het.
Notes: ≡ homotypic synonym; = heterotypic synonym

== Distribution and habitat ==
Erythranthe lewisii is native to western North America from Alaska to California to Colorado, where it grows in moist habitat such as stream banks, and is generally found at higher elevations in montane areas.

== Pollination ==
Erythranthe lewisii is pollinated by bees (primarily Bombus and Osmia), which feed off of its nectar and transfer its pollen. Although it is fully interfertile with its sister species, E. cardinalis, the two do not interbreed in the wild, a difference ascribed primarily to pollinator differences (E. cardinalis is pollinated by hummingbirds) in areas of overlap.

== Uses ==
This plant is cultivated as an ornamental in mild or coastal areas, as it does not tolerate prolonged freezing. In the UK it has gained the Royal Horticultural Society's Award of Garden Merit. It prefers a very damp soil in full sunlight.

Native Americans ate the leaves of the plant.
