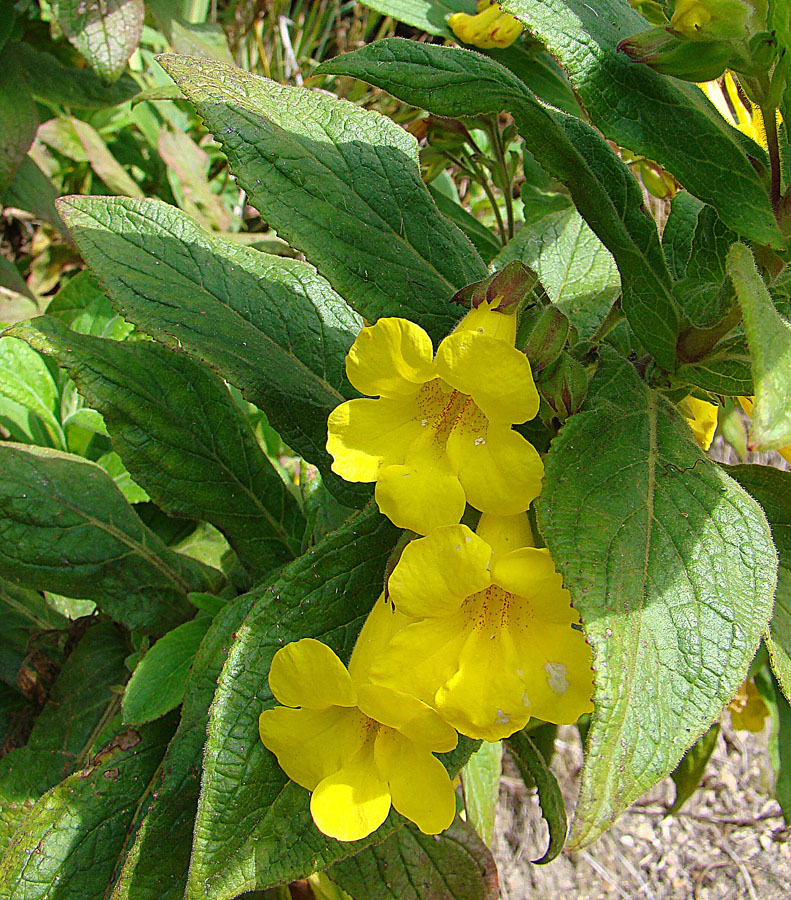
- Hemichaena fruticosa

Scientific classification
- Kingdom: Plantae
- Clade: Embryophytes
- Clade: Tracheophytes
- Clade: Angiosperms
- Clade: Eudicots
- Clade: Asterids
- Order: Lamiales
- Family: Phrymaceae
- Genus: Hemichaena; Benth.

Synonyms
- Berendtia A.Gray; Berendtiella Wettst. & Harms; Mimulus sect. Tropanthus A.L.Grant

= Hemichaena =

Genus of flowering plants

Hemichaena is a flowering plant genus in the family Phrymaceae. It includes five species native to Mexico and Central America. which was traditionally placed in family Scrophulariaceae. In the 2012 restructuring of Mimulus by Barker, et al., based largely upon DNA evidence, only seven species were left in Mimulus.

== Species ==
Five species are accepted.

- Hemichaena coulteri (A.Gray) Thieret
- Hemichaena fruticosa Benth.
- Hemichaena levigata (B.L.Rob. & Greenm.) Thieret
- Hemichaena spinulosa (Benth.) Thieret
- Hemichaena rugosa (S.Watson) Thieret
