= Encopella =

Scientific classification
- Kingdom: Plantae
- Clade: Tracheophytes
- Clade: Angiosperms
- Clade: Eudicots
- Clade: Asterids
- Order: Lamiales
- Family: Plantaginaceae
- Genus: Encopella; Pennell (1920)
- Species: E. tenuifolia

Binomial name
- Encopella tenuifolia (Griseb.) Pennell (1920)

Synonyms
- Encopa Griseb. (1866), nom. illeg.; Encopa tenuifolia Griseb. (1866)

Genus of plants

Encopella tenuifolia is a species of flowering plant belonging to the family Plantaginaceae. It is the sole species in genus Encopella. It is endemic to Cuba.
