= Bythophyton =

Scientific classification
- Kingdom: Plantae
- Clade: Tracheophytes
- Clade: Angiosperms
- Clade: Eudicots
- Clade: Asterids
- Order: Lamiales
- Family: Plantaginaceae
- Genus: Bythophyton; Hook.f.

Genus of flowering plants

Bythophyton is a genus of flowering plants belonging to the family Plantaginaceae.

Its native range is Eastern Himalaya.

Species:

- Bythophyton indicum (Hook.f. & Thomson) Hook.f.
