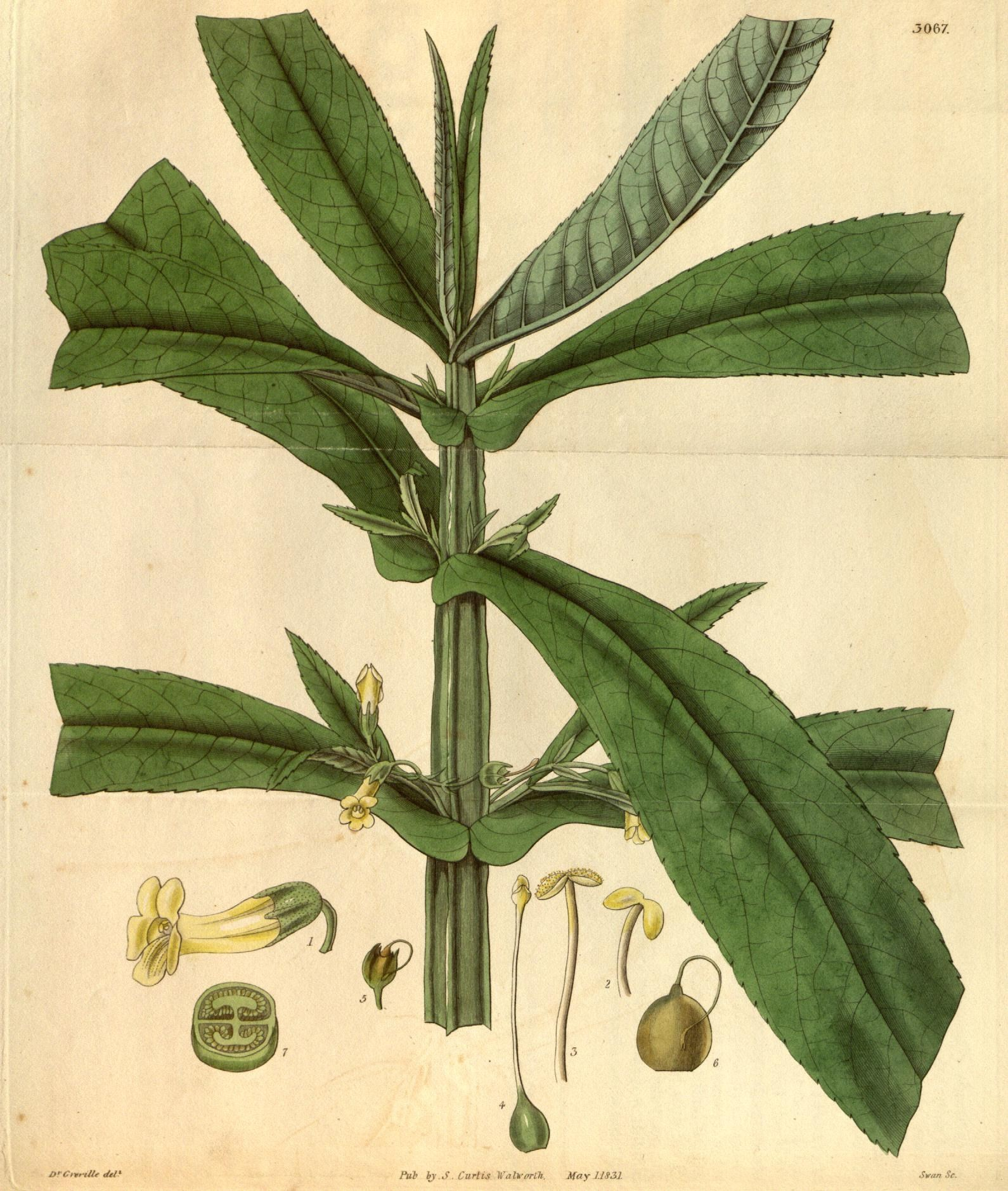
- Curtis's botanical magazine (Plate 3067)

Scientific classification
- Kingdom: Plantae
- Clade: Tracheophytes
- Clade: Angiosperms
- Clade: Eudicots
- Clade: Asterids
- Order: Lamiales
- Family: Phrymaceae
- Genus: Leucocarpus; D.Don
- Species: L. perfoliatus

Binomial name
- Leucocarpus perfoliatus (Kunth) Benth.

Synonyms
- Conobea alata (D.Don) Graham; Leucocarpus alatus D.Don; Leucocarpus americanus Glück; Leucocarpus americanus f. natans Glück; Leucocarpus americanus f. submersus Glück; Leucocarpus americanus f. terrestris Glück; Mimulus perfoliatus Kunth

= Leucocarpus =

Genus of plants

Leucocarpus is a genus of flowering plants belonging to the family Phrymaceae. It includes a single species, Leucocarpus perfoliatus, a subshrub or shrub native to humid tropical regions of the Americas, from Mexico through Central America to Venezuela and Bolivia.
