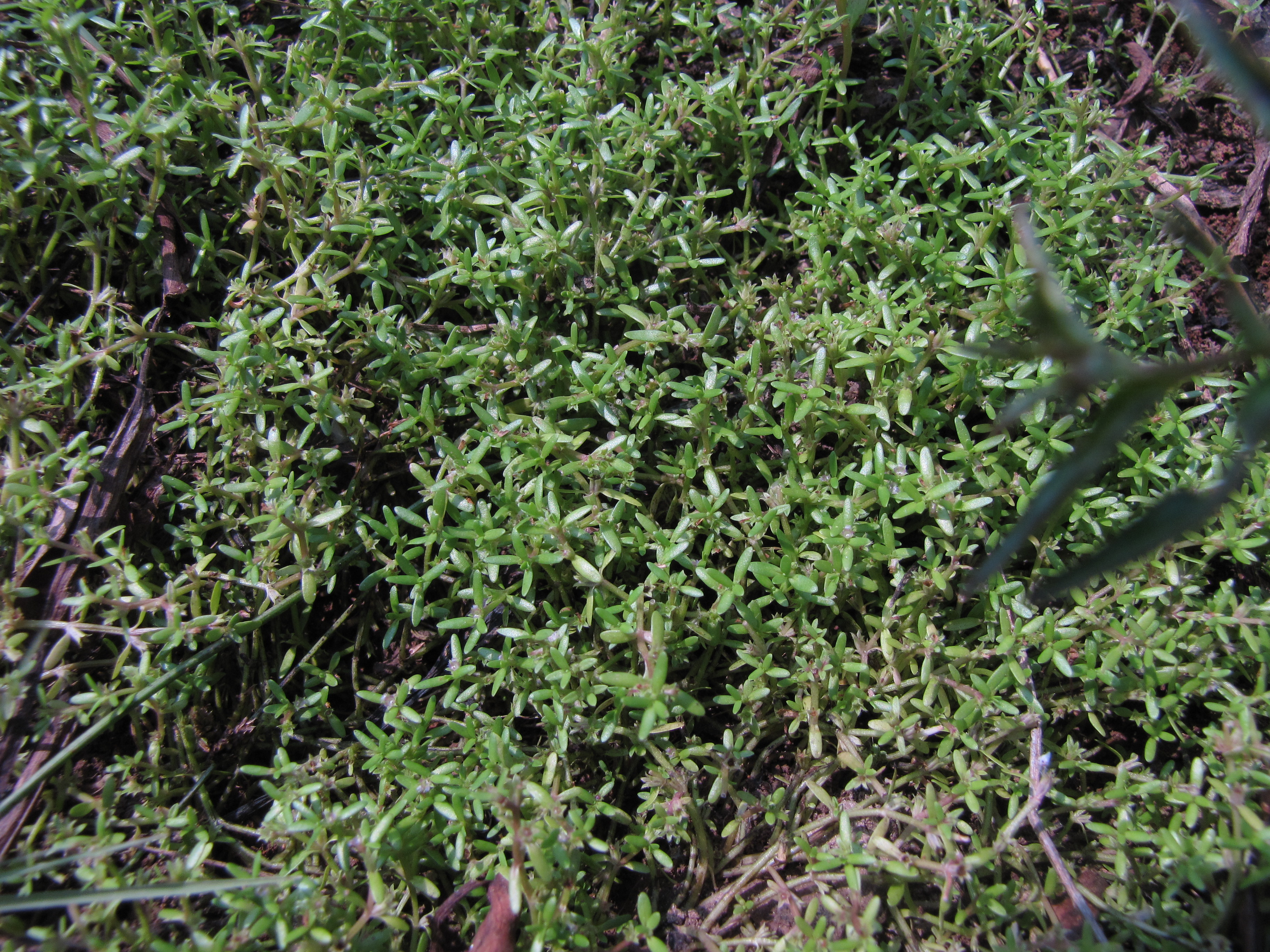
- Microcarpaea minima

Scientific classification
- Kingdom: Plantae
- Clade: Tracheophytes
- Clade: Angiosperms
- Clade: Eudicots
- Clade: Asterids
- Order: Lamiales
- Family: Phrymaceae
- Genus: Microcarpaea; R.Br.

= Microcarpaea =

Genus of plants

Microcarpaea is a genus of flowering plants belonging to the family Phrymaceae.

Its native range is Tropical and Subtropical Asia to Northeastern Australia.

== Species ==
Species:

- Microcarpaea agonis A.R.Bean
- Microcarpaea minima (J.Koenig ex Retz.) Merr.
