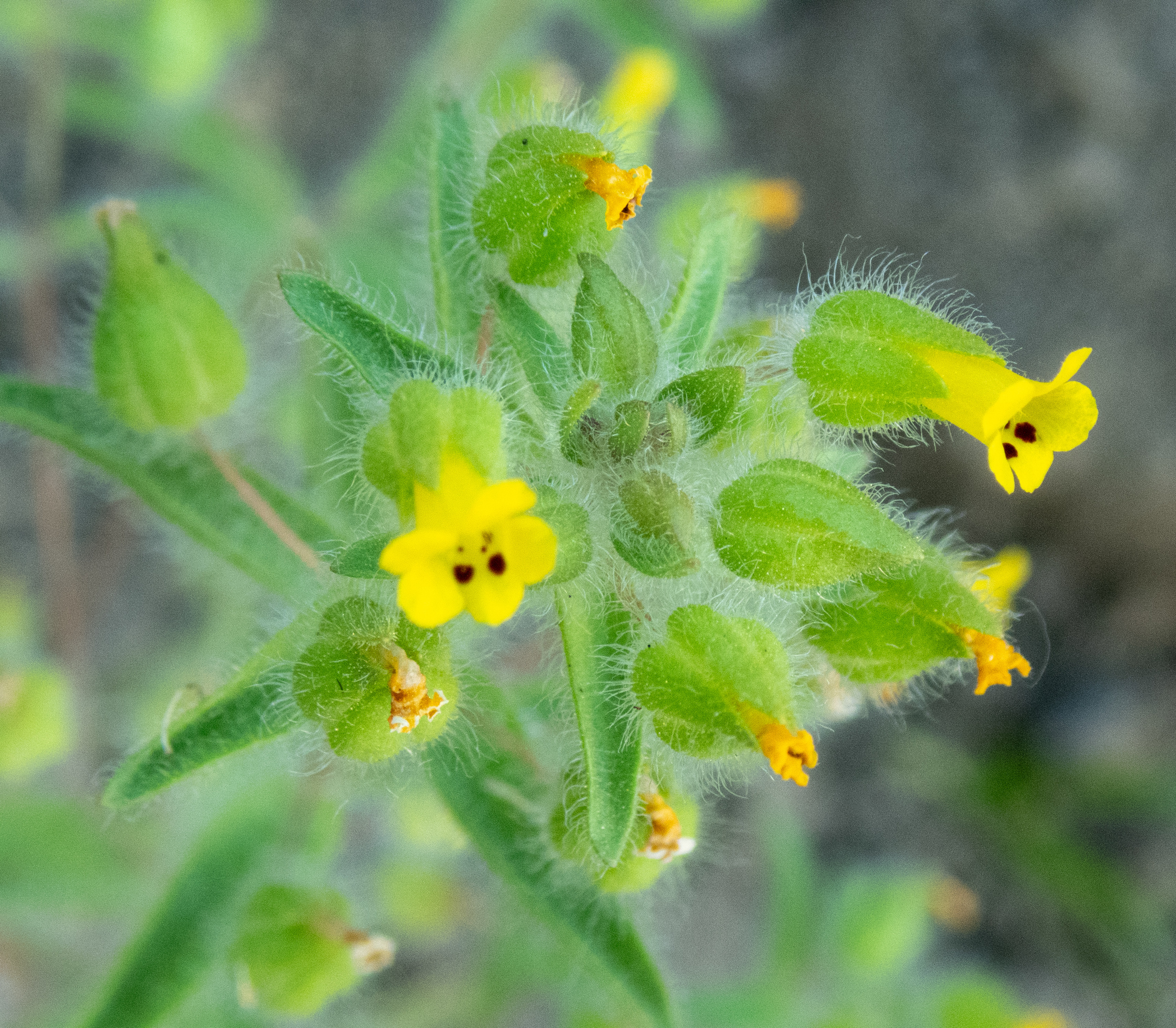

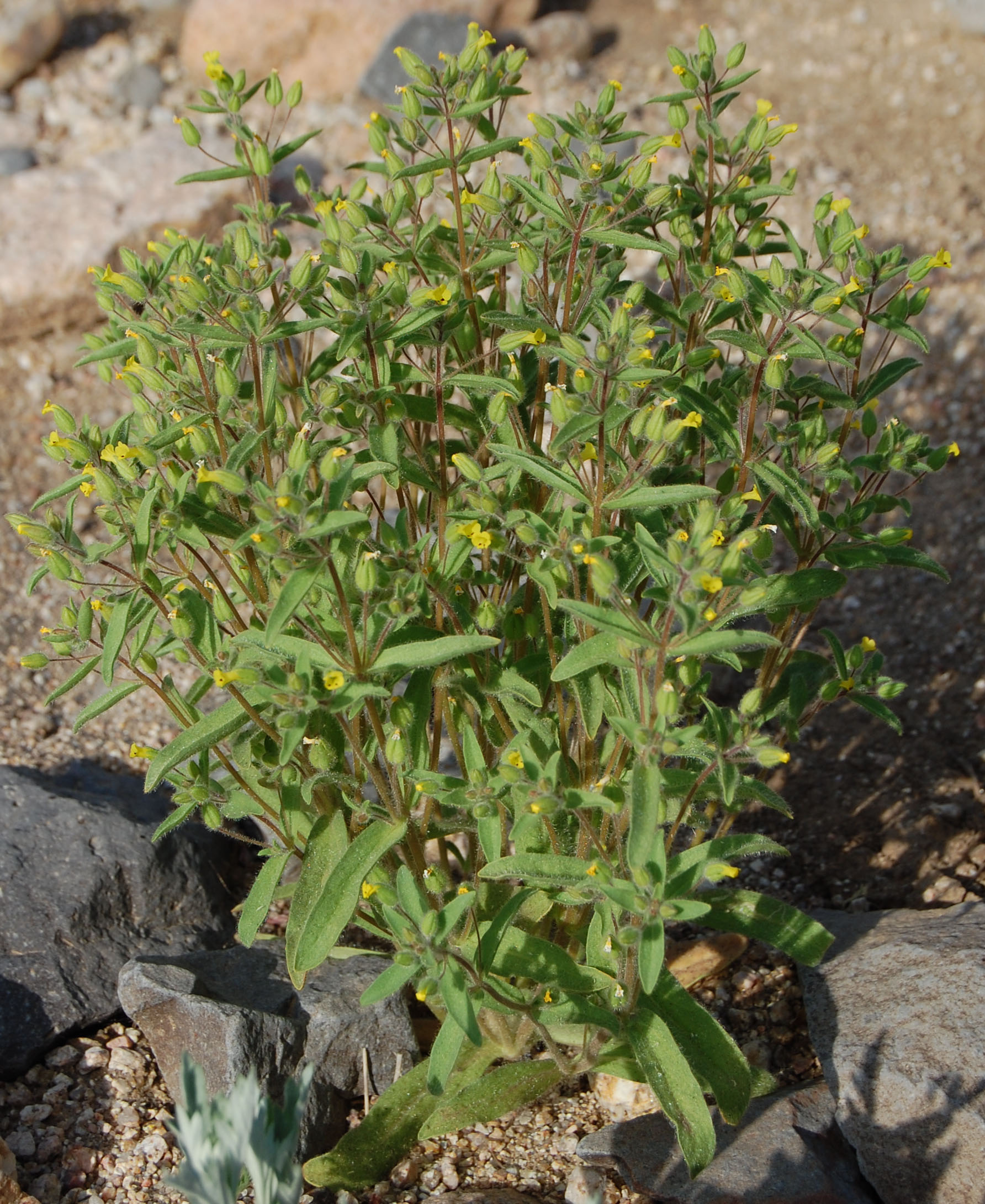

Scientific classification
- Kingdom: Plantae
- Clade: Tracheophytes
- Clade: Angiosperms
- Clade: Eudicots
- Clade: Asterids
- Order: Lamiales
- Family: Phrymaceae
- Genus: Mimetanthe; Greene
- Species: M. pilosa

Binomial name
- Mimetanthe pilosa (Benth.) Greene

Synonyms
- Mimulus exilis Durand & Hilg.; Mimulus pilosus (Benth.) S.Watson; Herpestis pilosa Benth.; Moniera pilosa (Benth.) Kuntze

= Mimetanthe =

Species of flowering plant

Mimetanthe is a genus of flowering plants in the family Phrymaceae. It has only one species, Mimetanthe pilosa, synonym Mimulus pilosus, known by the common names false monkeyflower and downy mimetanthe. It is native to the western United States (Arizona, California, Idaho, Nevada, Oregon, Utah and Washington State) and Baja California, where it grows in moist and disturbed habitat types. This plant is different enough from other monkeyflowers that it is treated in its own monotypic genus, Mimetanthe, or it may be retained in Mimulus.

It is an annual herb growing to a maximum height of about 35 centimeters. It is coated densely in long hairs. The oppositely arranged, narrow or wide lance-shaped leaves 1 to 3 centimeters long. The tubular base of the flower is encapsulated in a calyx of sepals. The yellow flower corolla is under a centimeter long, divided into five rounded lobes at the mouth, and often dotted with red in the throat.
