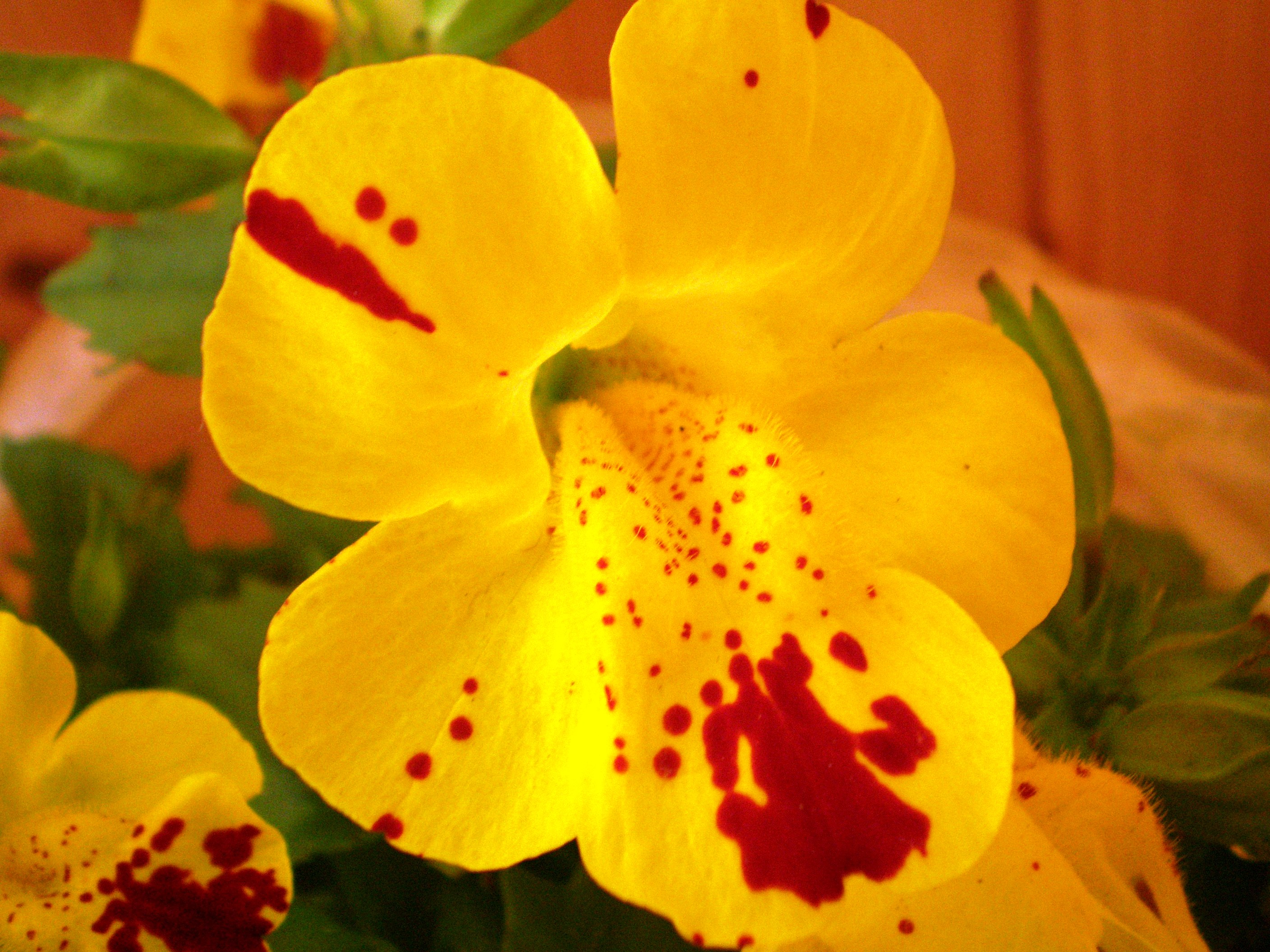

Scientific classification
- Kingdom: Plantae
- Clade: Embryophytes
- Clade: Tracheophytes
- Clade: Angiosperms
- Clade: Eudicots
- Clade: Asterids
- Order: Lamiales
- Family: Phrymaceae
- Genus: Erythranthe
- Species: E. lutea

Binomial name
- Erythranthe lutea (L.) G.L.Nesom (2012)

Varieties
- Erythranthe lutea var. lutea; Erythranthe lutea var. rivularis (Lindl.) Silverside; Erythranthe lutea var. variegata (Poit.) G.L.Nesom

Synonyms
- Synonymy: Mimulus luteus L. synonyms of var. lutea: Erythranthe lacerata (Pennell) G.L.Nesom; Mimulus glabratus var. micranthus (Phil.) B.Boivin; Mimulus groomii Voss, pro syn.; Mimulus laceratus Pennell; Mimulus luteus var. alpinus Lindl.; Mimulus luteus var. aurantiacus Reiche; Mimulus luteus subvar. macrophyllus Clos; Mimulus luteus var. micranthus Phil.; Mimulus luteus var. wilsonii Van Houtte; Mimulus maculatus F.Dietr.; Mimulus nummularis Gay; Mimulus ocellatus Gerst.; Mimulus perluteus Voss; Mimulus punctatus Miers ex Bertero; Mimulus quinquevulnerus F.Hässl.; Mimulus splendens Steud., not validly publ.; Mimulus youngii Voss synonyms of var. rivularis: Mimulus luteus var. rivularis Lindl.; Mimulus rivularis (Lindl.) Poit. synonyms of var. variegata: Erythranthe nummularia (Clos) Silverside; Erythranthe variegata (Poit.) Silverside; Mimulus luteus var. nummularius Clos; Mimulus luteus var. variegatus (Poit.) Hook.f.; Mimulus nummularius (Clos) Stace; Mimulus variegatus Poit.

= Erythranthe lutea =

Species of flowering plant

Erythranthe lutea is a species of monkeyflower also known as yellow monkeyflower, monkey musk, blotched monkey flowers, and blood-drop-emlets. It was formerly known as Mimulus luteus. It is a perennial native to temperate South America, including Chile and western and southern Argentina.

== Description ==
E. lutea blooms in the summer and grows to about 30 centimetres (12 in) in height. The flowers are yellow with irregular red blotches and the leaves are hairy, paired, and round. Because of its yellow petals, E. luteus is in the "yellow monkeyflower" group, unlike most members of the genus, which have red or pink petals.

Some sources list Erythranthe lutea separately due to chromosomal variations. Barker, etal (2012) proposes a new taxonomy for Phrymaceae, leaving only 7 species in Mimulus, none in Mimulus lutea, and placing 111 in Erythranthe. Barker also offers 4 different options for how to implement this new taxonomy.

The luteus group consists of Erythranthe luteus var. variegatus, E. naiandinus and E. cupreus.

== Distribution and habitat ==
Erythranthe lutea prefers to grow in wet habitats such as marshes and riverbanks. It is native to temperate South America, including Chile and western and southern Argentina. It has been naturalized in Britain, having been first cultivated there circa 1826.
