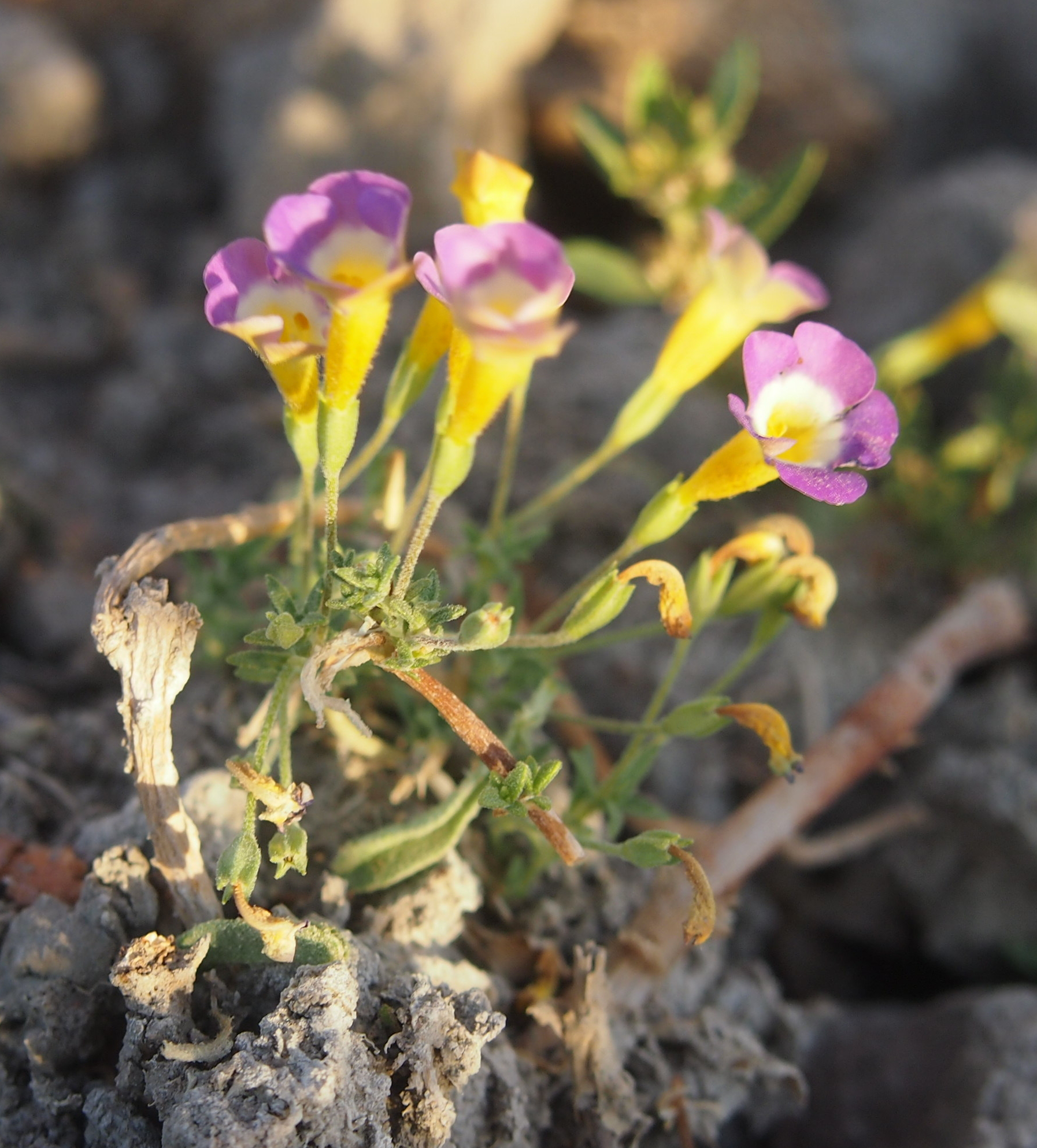

Scientific classification
- Kingdom: Plantae
- Clade: Embryophytes
- Clade: Tracheophytes
- Clade: Angiosperms
- Clade: Eudicots
- Clade: Asterids
- Order: Lamiales
- Family: Phrymaceae
- Genus: Elacholoma; F.Muell. & Tate

= Elacholoma =

Genus of plants

Elacholoma is a genus of flowering plants belonging to the family Phrymaceae.

Its native range is Central Australia.

Species:

- Elacholoma hornii F.Muell. & Tate
- Elacholoma prostrata (Benth.) W.R.Barker & Beardsley
