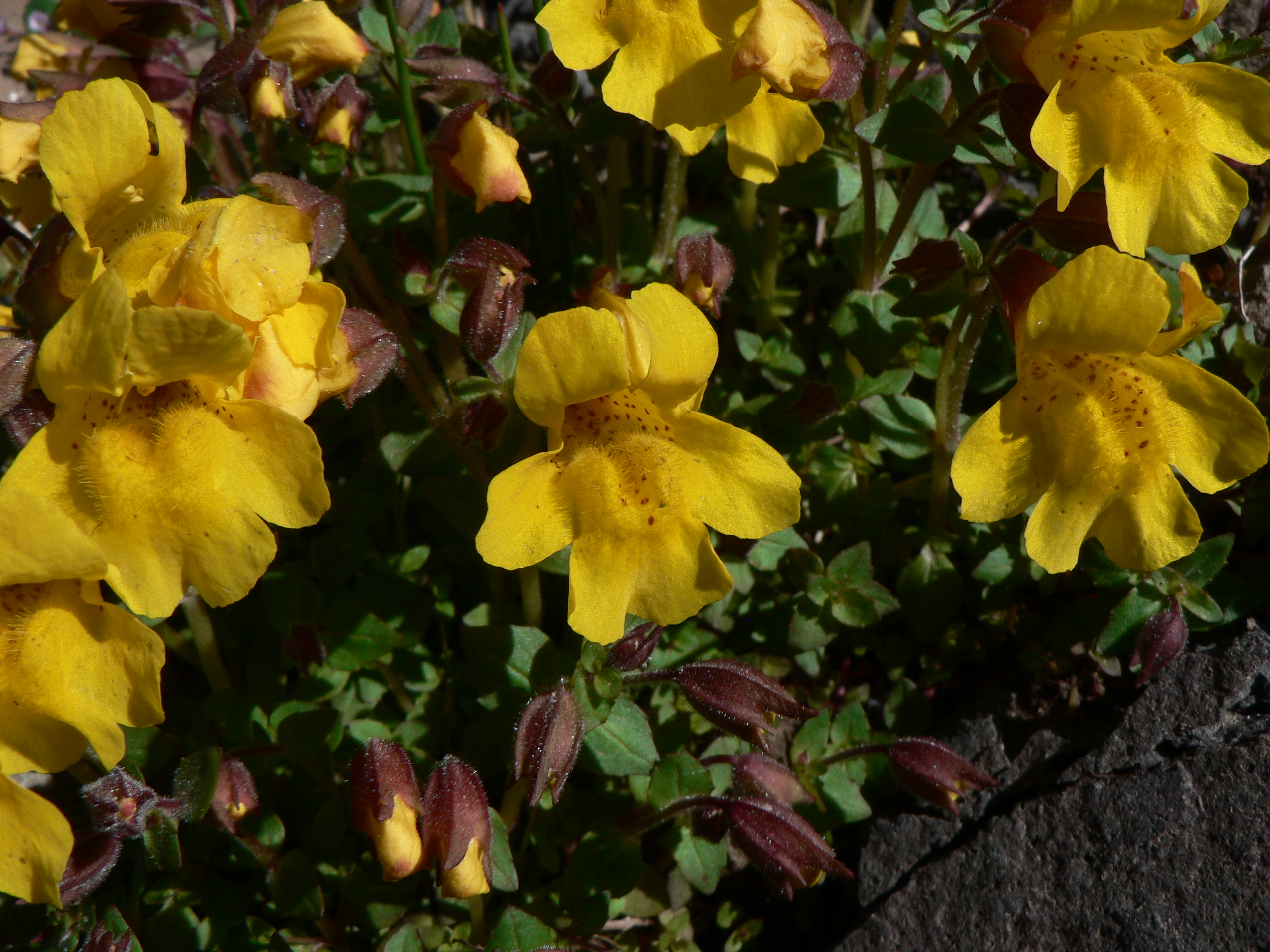
- Erythranthe tilingii

Scientific classification
- Kingdom: Plantae
- Clade: Tracheophytes
- Clade: Angiosperms
- Clade: Eudicots
- Clade: Asterids
- Order: Lamiales
- Family: Phrymaceae; Schauer

Genera
- About 11; see text.

= Phrymaceae =

Lopseed family

Family of flowering plants

Phrymaceae, also known as the lopseed family, is a small family of flowering plants in the order Lamiales. It has a nearly cosmopolitan distribution, but is concentrated in two centers of diversity, one in Australia, the other in western North America. Members of this family occur in diverse habitats, including deserts, river banks and mountains.

Phrymaceae is a family of mostly herbs and a few subshrubs, bearing tubular, bilaterally symmetric flowers. They can be annuals or perennials. Some of the Australian genera are aquatic or semiaquatic. One of these, Glossostigma, is among the smallest of flowering plants, larger than the aquatic Lemna but similar in size to the terrestrial Lepuropetalon. The smallest members of Phrymaceae are only a few centimeters long, while the largest are woody shrubs to 4 m tall. The floral structure of Phrymaceae is variable, to such an extent that a morphological assessment is difficult. Reproduction is also variable, being brought about by different mating systems which may be sexual or asexual, and may involve outcrossing, self-fertilization, or mixed mating. Some are pollinated by insects, others by hummingbirds. The most common fruit type in this family is a dehiscent capsule containing numerous seeds, but exceptions exist such as an achene, in Phryma leptostachya, or a berry-like fruit in Leucocarpus.

About 16 species are in cultivation. They are known horticulturally as "Mimulus" and were formerly placed in the genus Mimulus when it was defined broadly to include about 150 species. Mimulus, as a botanical name, rather than a common name or horticultural name, now represents a genus of only seven species. Most of its former species have been transferred to Diplacus or Erythranthe. Six of the horticultural species are of special importance. These are Diplacus aurantiacus, Diplacus puniceus, Erythranthe cardinalis, Erythranthe guttata, Erythranthe lutea, and Erythranthe cuprea.

Phrymaceae has recently become a model system for evolutionary studies.

Within the order Lamiales, Phrymaceae is a member of an unnamed clade of five families. This clade has the topology of a phylogenetic grade and can therefore be represented as {Mazaceae [Phrymaceae (Paulowniaceae <Orobanchaceae + Lamiaceae>)]}. Two of these families, Mazaceae and Rehmanniaceae are not part of the APG III system. They were not formally validated until 2011.

The composition of Phrymaceae and the delimitation of genera changed radically from 2002 to 2012 as a result of molecular phylogenetic studies. Previously, Phrymaceae had been monotypic with Phryma leptostachya as its only species. It was limited in geographic range to eastern North America and eastern China. Phryma had been previously placed by Cronquist in Verbenaceae. Research on phylogenetic relationships revealed that several genera, traditionally included in Scrophulariaceae, were actually more closely related to Phryma than to Scrophularia. These genera became part of an expanded Phrymaceae. Mazus and Lancea were included in Phrymaceae for a short time before further studies indicated that they, along with Dodartia should be segregated as a new family, Mazaceae.

As currently understood, Phrymaceae consists of about 210 species in 13 genera. Erythranthe (111 species) and Diplacus (46 species) are much larger than the other genera. Phrymaceae is distributed nearly worldwide but with the majority of species in western North America (about 130 species) and Australia (about 30 species). Phrymaceae consists of four clades, all of which have strong statistical support in cladistic analyses of DNA sequences. No relationships among these four clades have been strongly supported by the bootstrap or posterior probability assessments of clade support in any of the datasets that have been produced so far. One of the four main clades consists of a single species, Phryma leptostachya. Another consists of Mimulus sensu stricto (seven species) and six genera that have an Australian distribution. The other two clades have an American-Asian disjunct distribution. One of these includes the large genus Diplacus, while the other includes the other large genus, Erythranthe.

Estimates of the number of species in Phrymaceae have varied widely because of a lack of clear differences between species in certain genera, especially Diplacus and Erythranthe. When these two genera have been treated as segregates of Mimulus, the number of species assigned to Mimulus sensu lato has ranged from about 90 to about 150. A 2008 paper indicates that the actual number of species is well over 150.

In 2012, a revision of Phrymaceae recognized 188 species in the family, but noted that 17 species from Australia and five from North America would be named and described in future publications. Ten of those unnamed species will be in Peplidium, raising the number of species in that genus from four to 14.

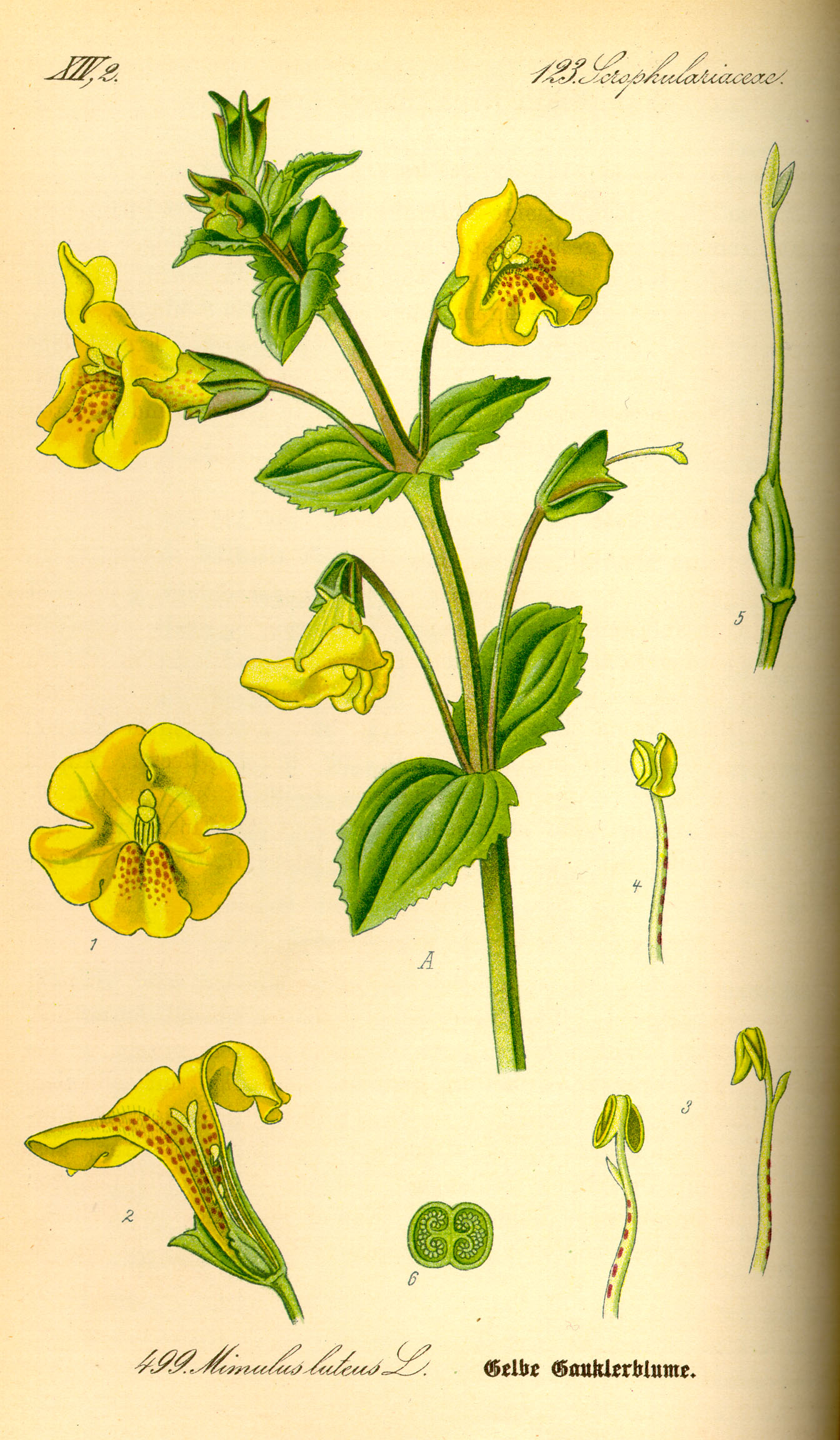
Mimulus guttatus from Thomé, Flora von Deutschland, Österreich und der Schweiz 1885

== Description ==
The following description is excerpted from the conspectus published in 2012.

Mostly annual or perennial herbs, a few subshrubs. Leaves opposite, sometimes glandular-punctate. Flowers hypogynous; usually in racemes, rarely solitary or in axillary clusters of 2 or 3. Calyx tubular, toothed, usually ribbed below teeth. Corolla zygomorphic, or rarely, sub-actinomorphic; 5-lobed, or rarely reduced to 3 or 4 lobes. Stamens 4, didynamous, or rarely 2. Filaments inserted on corolla tube. Carpels 2, bearing many ovules; or rarely, carpel 1 with a single ovule. Stigmas 2-lobed, sensitive except in Elacholoma hornii which has a linear stigma. Fruit a loculicidal capsule, rarely a schizocarp or berry; borne in a persistent calyx. Seeds small; many or only 1 (Phryma).

The family Phrymaceae is mainly defined by the following three characteristics:

- Tubular, toothed calyces (with five lobes).
- Stigmas with two lamellas that have sensitive inner surfaces, that close together on contact with a pollinator.
- Capsules that are loculicidally dehiscent, splitting between the partitions of the ovary.

== Taxonomy ==
The family Phrymaceae was established in 1847 by Johannes Conrad Schauer as a guest author in the Prodromus of Alphonse Pyramus de Candolle. The family has often been called "Phrymataceae", even in modern times, but the correct name for the family is Phrymaceae.

Until 2002, Phrymaceae was usually defined as consisting of only a single, anomalous species, Phryma leptostachya. Whenever Phrymaceae was not recognized, Phryma was usually placed in the family Verbenaceae, but sometimes in Lamiaceae. Mimulus and its relatives were usually placed in some version of Scrophulariaceae that was much larger than the currently accepted circumscription of that family.

In 2002, a molecular phylogenetic study showed that Phryma formed a strongly supported clade with Mimulus and its various relatives. Chloroplast DNA showed Phryma to be embedded within a broadly defined Mimulus, but this result was not strongly supported, and was contradicted by data from the ITS and ETS regions of the nuclear genome.

In 2004, in the most recent comprehensive treatment of families and genera in Lamiales, Phrymaceae consisted of Phryma only. In that treatment, it was suggested that Mimulus and its relatives (8 genera) might be transferred from Scrophulariaceae to Phrymaceae. It was also suggested that 11 other genera in Scrophulariaceae might be transferred in the same way. The 11 "additional genera" were Dodartia, Mazus, Lancea, Bythophyton, Encopella, Micranthemum (now including synonym Hemianthus), Bryodes, Dintera, Psammetes, and Mimulicalyx.

Dodartia, Mazus, and Lancea make Phrymaceae paraphyletic if they are included within it. They now constitute the related family Mazaceae.

The monotypic genera Bythophyton and Encopella might properly belong to Plantaginaceae tribe Gratioliae. This hypothesis has never been tested by molecular phylogenetics.

Hemianthus is so similar to Micranthemum that its recognition as a separate genus is doubtful. Micranthemum and Bryodes have been shown to be members of Linderniaceae.

The African monotypic genera Dintera and Psammetes are little known and their affinities remain obscure. Mimulicalyx has 2 species, both endemic to China. Their familial placement remains uncertain.

Thus Bythophyton, Encopella, Dintera, Psammetes, and Mimulicalyx might be considered as possible members of Phrymaceae since they have not been unequivocally placed elsewhere. Instead of recognizing Phrymaceae and several of the other Lamiales families of APG III, some authors have chosen to maintain a large polyphyletic Scrophulariaceae until there is a clear understanding of how it should be "disintegrated".

=== Genera ===
A taxonomic conspectus of Phrymaceae published in 2012 included 13 genera. In that conspectus, Eunanus, Tricholoma, and Berendtiella were not accepted as they are in some recent works. Eunanus is reduced to a section in Diplacus. Tricholoma is subsumed within Glossostigma. Subsequent molecular phylogenetic studies showed that Cyrtandromoea also belonged in the family, a placement accepted by Plants of the World Online, which also accepts the monospecific genus Mimulicalyx, producing a total of 15 genera.

- Cyrtandromoea Zoll.
- Diplacus Nutt.
- Elacholoma F.Muell. & Tate, (the stigma lobes are relatively long and are receptive over most of their length)
- Erythranthe Spach
- Glossostigma Wight & Arn. (with three or four lobes in the calyx instead five; contains one large and one vestigial stigma lobe)
- Hemichaena Benth.
- Leucocarpus D.Don
- Microcarpaea R.Br.
- Mimetanthe Greene
- Mimulicalyx P.C.Tsoong
- Mimulus L.
- Peplidium Delile (contains one large and one vestigial stigma lobe)
- Phryma L.
- Thyridia W.R.Barker & Beardsley
- Uvedalia R.Br.
