= Foxglove (disambiguation) =

Foxglove is a common name of Digitalis.

Foxglove may also refer to:

== Biology ==
- Foxglove-tree, a nickname for Paulownia tomentosa
- Chinese foxglove (Rehmannia), specifically
  - Rehmannia elata
- Foxglove beardtongue
- Foxglove pug, a European moth

== Entertainment ==
- Foxglove (DC Comics), a fictional character from The Sandman graphic novels
- Foxglove, an enemy in the Way of the Tiger gamebook series
- Foxglove Summer, a novel published in 2014

== Places ==
- Foxglove Oval, an athletic park in New South Wales, Australia
- Foxglove Covert, a nature reserve in North Yorkshire, England

== Transportation ==
- HMS Foxglove (1915), a British Royal Navy sloop launched in 1915 and scrapped in 1946
- Mikoyan Project 1.42, NATO reporting name "Foxglove", a technology demonstrator aircraft

== See also ==
- False foxglove (disambiguation)
