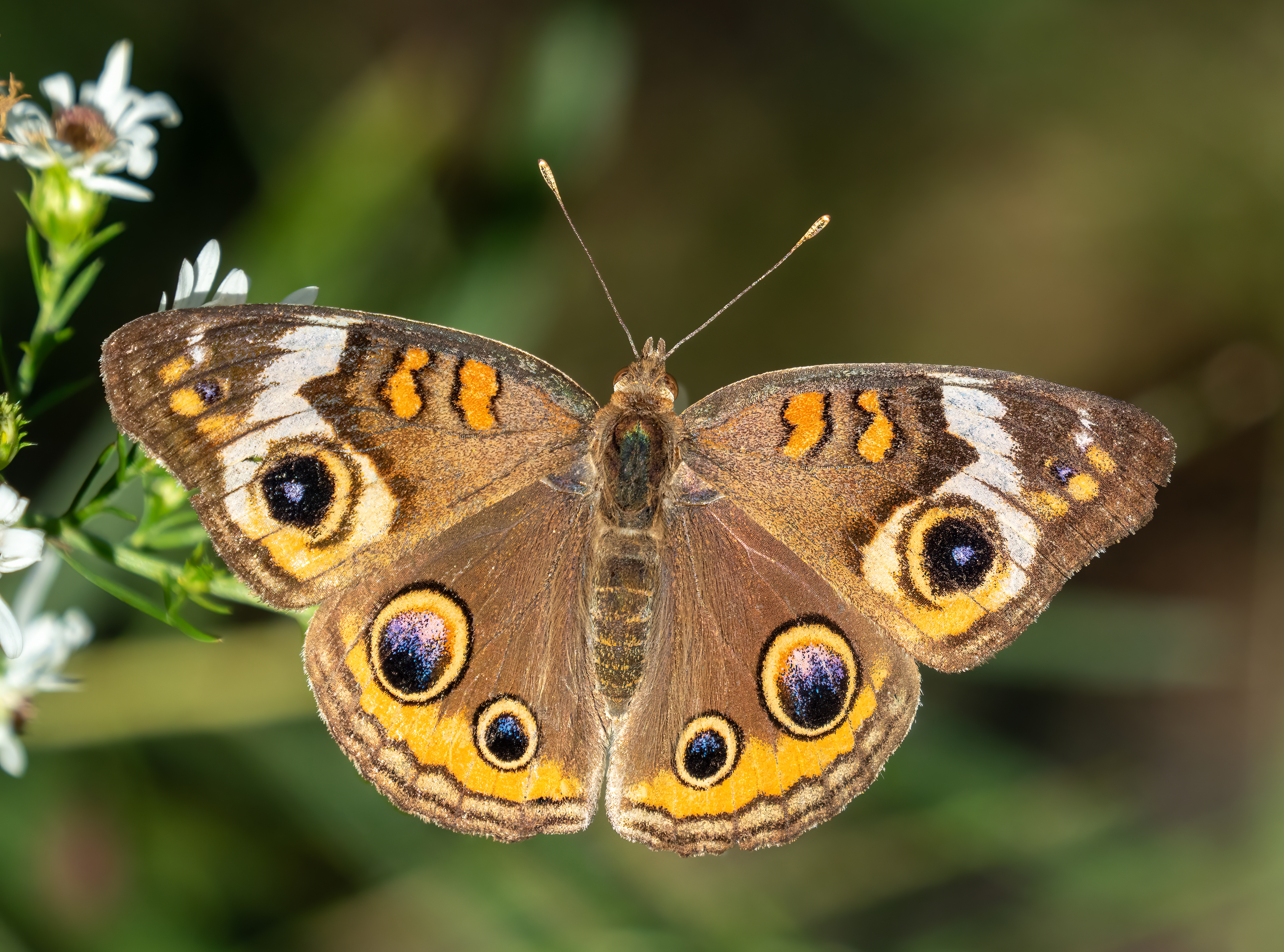

Conservation status
- Secure (NatureServe)

- Least Concern (IUCN 3.1)

Scientific classification
- Kingdom: Animalia
- Phylum: Arthropoda
- Clade: Pancrustacea
- Class: Insecta
- Order: Lepidoptera
- Family: Nymphalidae
- Genus: Junonia
- Species: J. coenia

Binomial name
- Junonia coenia Hübner, 1822

= Junonia coenia =

Common buckeye

Species of butterfly

Junonia coenia, known as the common buckeye or buckeye, is a butterfly in the family Nymphalidae. It is found as a resident or vagrant across much of North America and Central America, as well as in parts of northern South America. This includes most of the eastern half of the US, the lower to middle Midwest, the Southwest (including most of California), southern Canada, and Mexico. Its habitat includes fields, dunes and scrub, typically in sunny environments up to 1,300 metres (4,300 ft) in altitude. It can be found in open areas with low vegetation and some bare ground. Its original ancestry has been traced to Africa, which then experienced divergence in Asia. The species Junonia grisea, the gray buckeye, is found west of the Rocky Mountains and was formerly a subspecies of Junonia coenia.

Caterpillars of these butterflies appear to prefer plants that produce iridoid glycosides, which are bitter compounds that release a hormone called gastrin that activates the digestive system (i.e. hunger); therefore, iridoid glycoside producing plants stimulate and attract their appetites particularly when found in plants like Plantago lanceolata. In fact, the presence of these metabolites may trigger oviposition behaviors in female butterflies so that descendant larval bodies may better incorporate iridoid glycosides. Iridoid glycolyside metabolites appear to have a growth-stimulating effect on caterpillars but a growth-reducing effect on predators. Predators like ants, wasps, birds, and small animals prefer to feed on iridoid glycoside poor caterpillars rather than iridoid glycoside rich larvae, potentially due to these effects. Therefore, immunity of J. coenia larvae to predators like ants appears to be strongly related to the concentration of iridoid glycosides sequestered in their bodies. However, too much iridoid glycosides in the diet can negatively affect the immune response of these larvae and lead to increased susceptibility to parasitism.

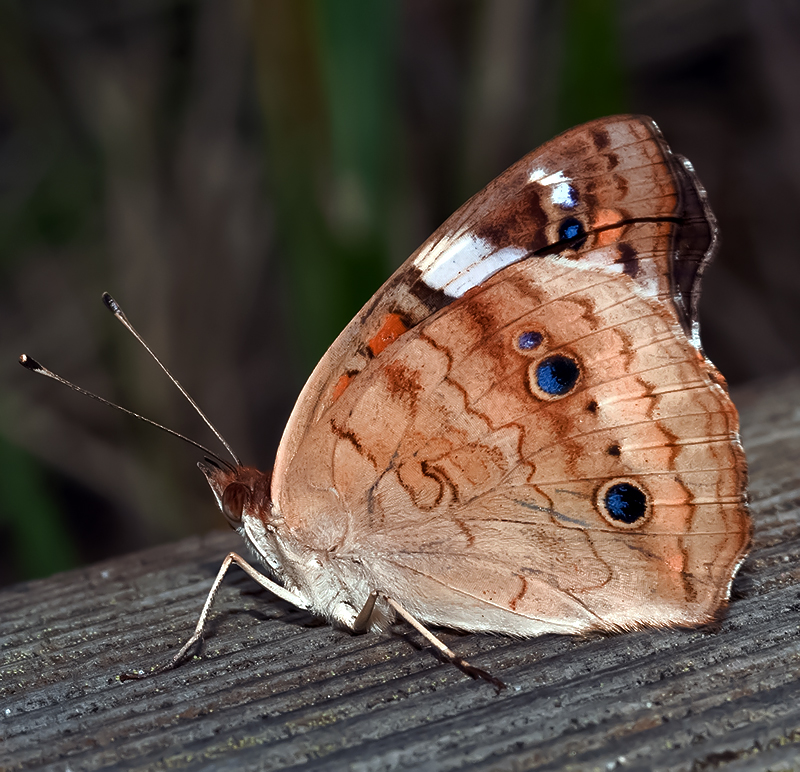
Common Buckeye - wings in closed position

Adult butterflies feed on flowers with certain pollinator cues: yellow flowers that are "pre-change", or flowers whose color has not been changed due to insect visitation or other factors. Common buckeye caterpillars feed in isolation rather than relying upon grouping behaviors. Vulnerability to the Junonia coenia densovirus is another concern for survivorship of common buckeye larvae.

== Description ==
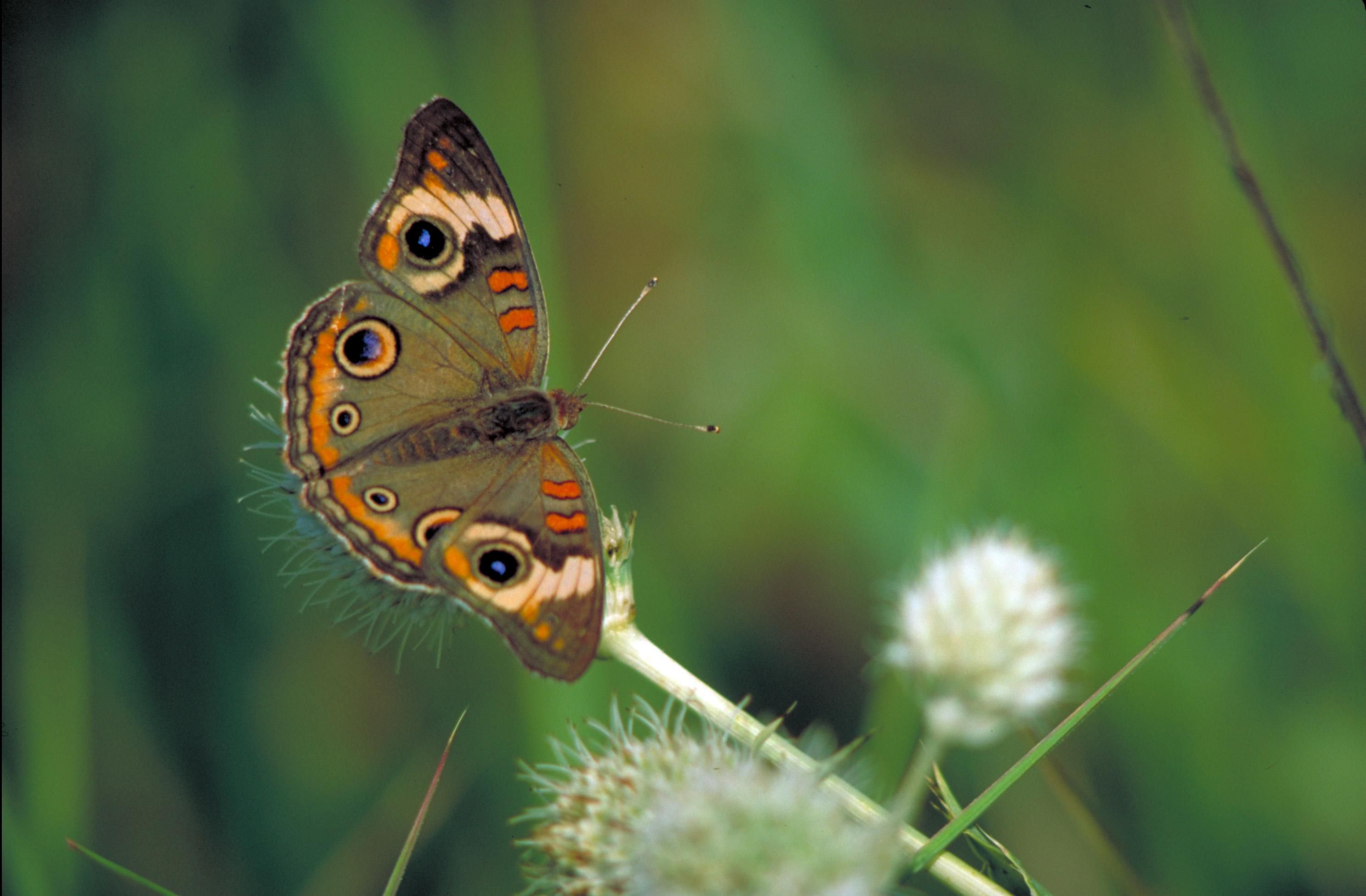
Common Buckeye Butterfly

=== Adult butterfly ===
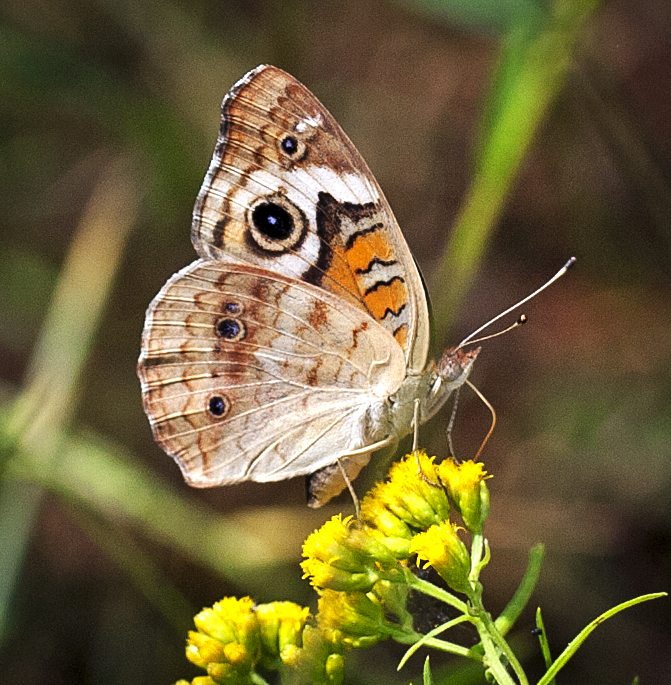
Common Buckeye (Junonia coenia) on Goldenrod flower

Common buckeye butterflies are colored mostly brown with some orange, black, white, blue, and magenta. The forewing features two proximal orange bars and a postmedian white band, which surrounds a prominent black eyespot and borders a smaller, more distal eyespot; both eyespots have a bluish center and each border a distal orange mark. The hindwing is mostly brown with an orange band towards the edge and a brown and white margin. It also has two eyespots, one larger and one smaller, each with a black and white outline 2 and 2.5 inches (5–6.5 cm).

=== Caterpillar ===
These caterpillars have a beautiful and complex color pattern. Their backs are mostly black with light-colored markings (white, gray, beige, or brownish, varying among individuals—see picture below), their sides have white markings and red-orange spots, and they have a brown underside. They have a mostly red-orange head with black markings on the face. They have spines running lengthwise along their back and sides, as many as 7 per segment. There is also a pair of small spines on the top of their head. These spines branch out (have smaller spines coming out of them) and appear a bit shiny-blue at the base. They also have 2 pairs of tiny white spines on each segment, near the bottom. The color patterns and spine forms are less pronounced in earlier instars. There are several other species that resemble these caterpillars in appearance, such as the painted lady, the Glanville fritillary, and the red admiral, which can be easily confused by an untrained observer. They can reach 4 cm (1 5/8 inches) in length.

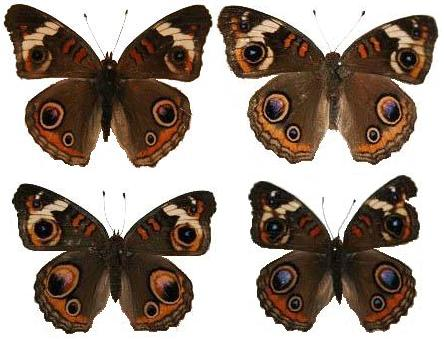
Dorsal variation

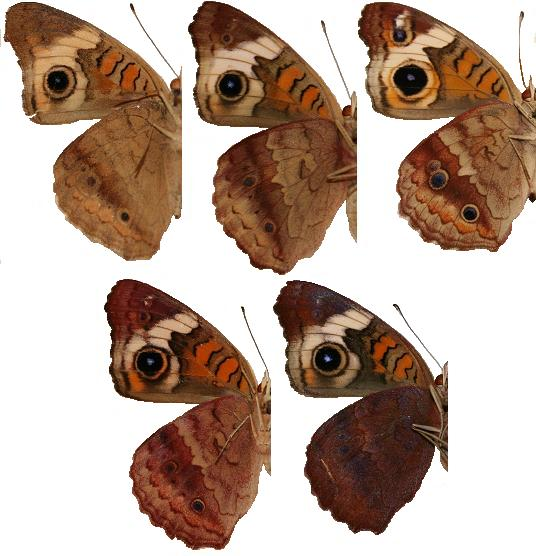
Ventral variation

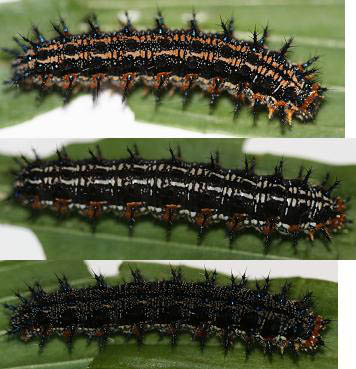
Larva variation

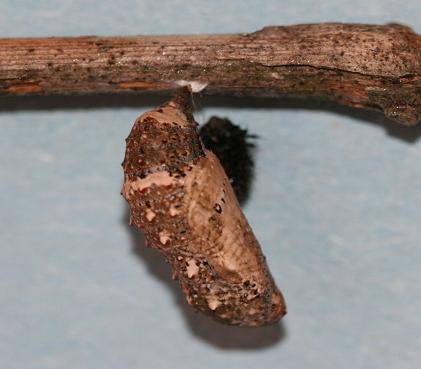
Chrysalis

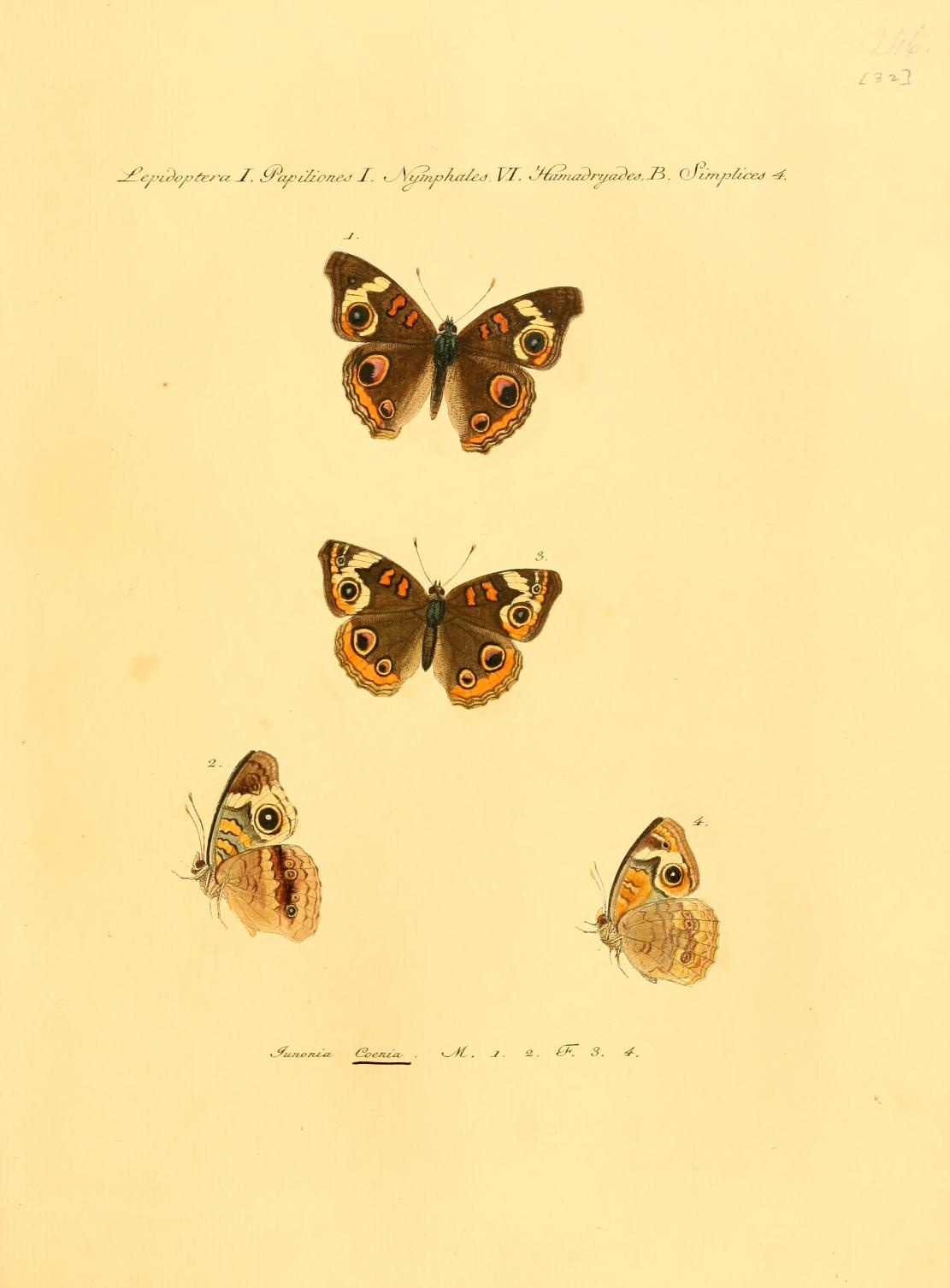
Plate accompanying Jacob Hübner's 1822 description

=== Pupa (chrysalis) ===
Like the more familiar monarchs, these caterpillars pupate by spinning a silk pad on a downward facing horizontal surface, attaching themselves with their rear end, and hanging in the form of the letter J for a day or so before shedding their skin to reveal the chrysalis. The chrysalis is mostly brown with beige markings, and has a prickly texture. It has a beige band near the top, another one at the "waist" (border between thorax and abdomen), and 4 pairs of beige dots running down its dorsal side. It is 18 mm long and 8 mm wide. When touched or handled excessively, it has a habit of wiggling its abdomen.

== Phylogeny ==
Junio probably arose from one African colonizing ancestor. In Asia, this diverged into J. atlites, J. iphita, and J. hedonia that resembled the African ancestor. These species then diverged into J. almanac, J. lemonias, and J. villida that began to differ morphologically from African ancestors. The Taxon Pulse Hypothesis is invoked to explain the vicariance as well as dispersal exhibited by this species where there is dispersal as the species expands until they find appropriate habitats. This then allows for speciation to occur in several isolated habitats. In Junonia the species may have expanded from Africa into Asia and then from Asia throughout "Australasia, Africa, and South America." In the 1930s established populations were recognized in Cuba and the Florida Keys. In the 1940s populations migrated inland from the coast of Florida and further into the southern United States.

== Food resources ==
=== Caterpillars ===
Caterpillars feed on a variety of plants including the narrowleaf plantain (Plantago lanceolata), the common greater plantain (Plantago major), blue toadflax, false foxglove, Mexican petunia (Ruellia species), the firecracker plant, and cudweed.

==== Host plant preferences ====
Iridoid glycosides trigger feeding behaviors of J. coenia larvae in northern California, serving as attractants and as stimulants. It also allows for higher growth and survival rates that appear to be best promoted in the plant Plantago lanceolata, an invasive plant in California. In fact, leaves from this plant were preferred over artificial diets with just the iridoid glycosides, indicating the presence of additional sources in P. lanceolata that might play a role in food preferences. Naturally, J. coenia consider iridoid glycosides in the host plant selection for larvae. This inclination for iridoid glycosides may also reflect its role in oviposition and microhabitat selection. Aucubin and catalpol are two other chemicals that can be stimulants and attractants for larval feeding behaviors.

=== Pollinator cues ===
A buckeye butterfly flitting from bloom to bloom nectaring

In the case of Lantana camara flowers, J. coenia preferentially feed on flowers in the yellow stage at a significantly higher rate that suggests associative learning. During early life stages, the butterfly feeds upon yellow and red flowers almost equally but over time focuses only on those flowers that are yellow and 'pre-change.' This is especially advantageous because the flower's color can be linked to its viability as well as the nectar reward that it can provide the pollinator. With this signal the pollinator can visit the right plant at the right time maximizing both its reproductive advantage as well as that of the flower. Moreover, the amount of nectar found within the flower can also influence the duration of a pollinator's visit to the plant.

== Parental care ==
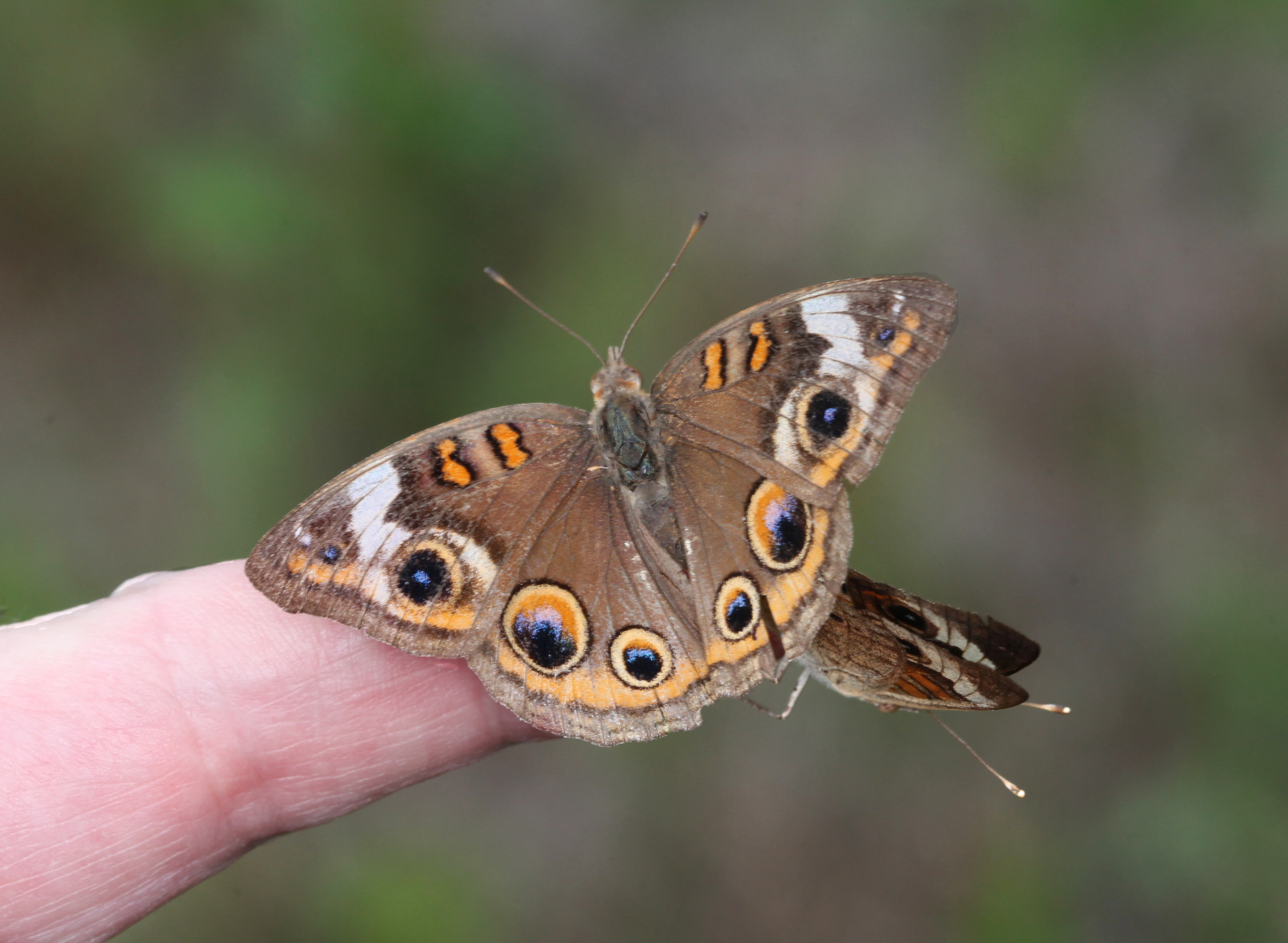
Common buckeye mating

=== Oviposition ===
In the process of oviposition, contact chemoreception is an important sense used to detect allelochemicals on individual leaves that promote or discourage oviposition. Females detect iridoid glycosides found in plants like P. lanceolata as oviposition cues. Similarly, a mix of catalpol and aucubin, as well as catalpol alone, also promotes oviposition. In addition, the quantity of catalpol also seems to play a role in oviposition because females choose to lay eggs in regions that are most concentrated with catalpol. Just one iridoid glycoside molecule is enough to promote oviposition to the same degree that would be seen on a hostplant leaf. However, with that said, females did prefer plants with more iridoid glycosides. Larvae concentrate large amounts of iridoid glycosides, and theoretical explanations for this include protection from predators. Therefore, evolution would favor female J. coenia that can detect more iridoid glycosides on host plants so that larvae can incorporate that into their diet and thus gain better protective mechanisms for survival.

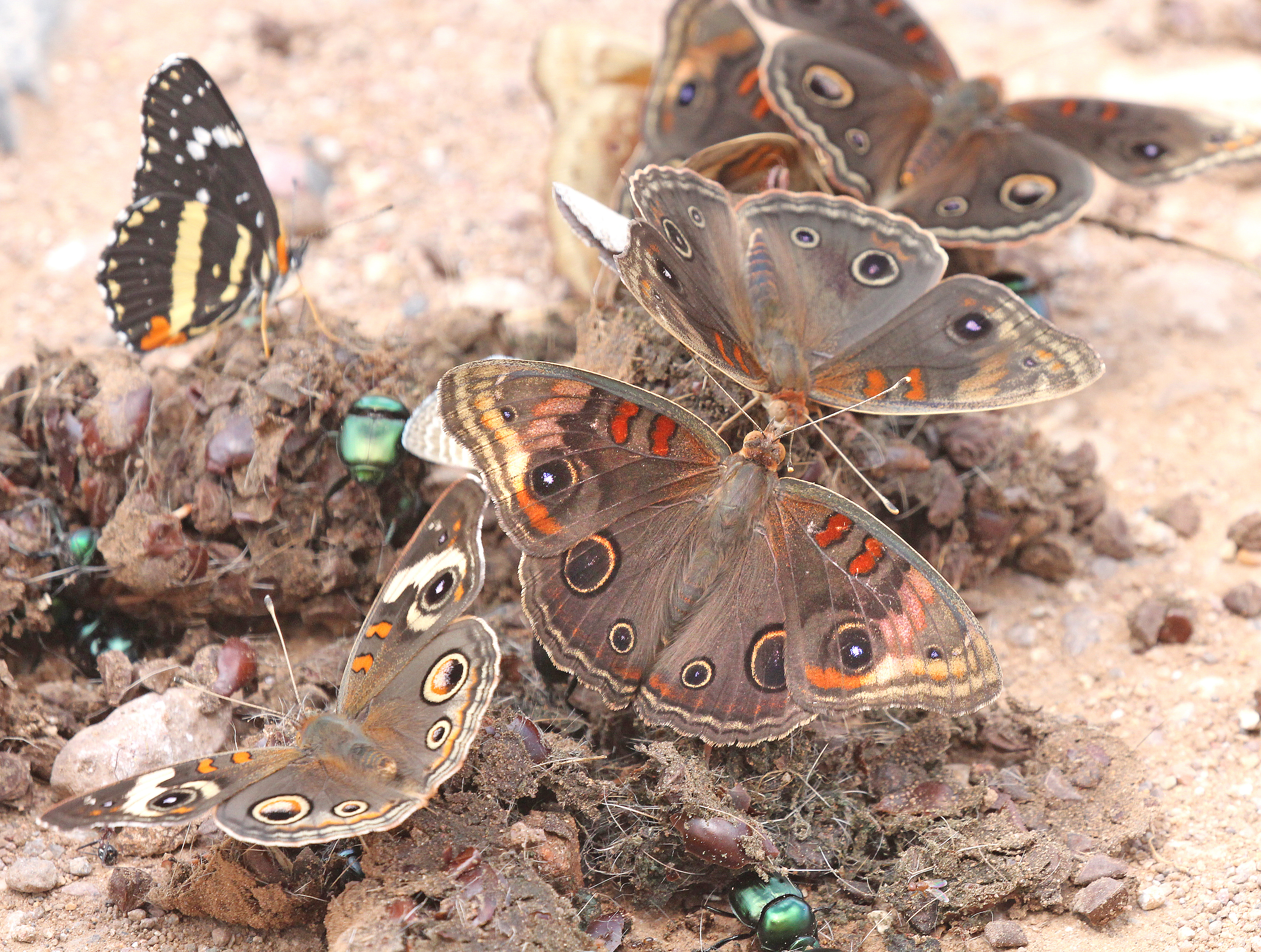
Aggregation of tropical buckeye, common buckeye, and bordered patch butterflies

== Social behavior ==
=== Caterpillar sociality ===
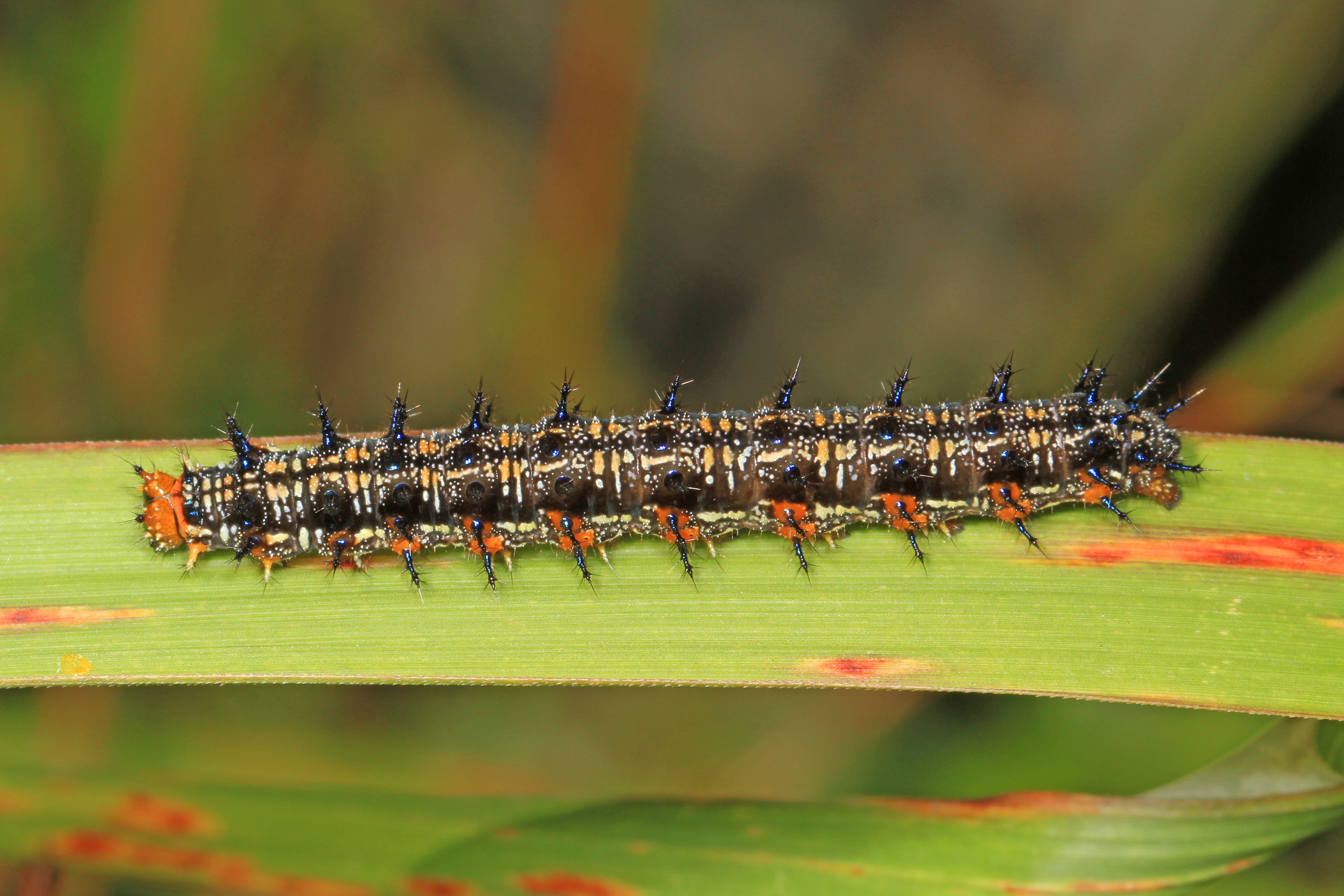
Common buckeye caterpillar

Caterpillars tend to feed individually and in isolation. For example, even in the case that multiple caterpillars are feeding upon the same plant, they will not be doing so cooperatively or based in a group dynamic. Caterpillars are generally not aggressive: they do not mind each other's presence and tend to abstain from fighting when running into one another.

== Migration ==
Common buckeyes move to the south along with tailwinds directed to the north or northwest after the cold fronts from September or October. They are sensitive to the cold and cannot spend the winter in northern regions that will experience extreme cold temperatures. However, they will migrate back from the south during the spring. It was spotted in California in late summer, early fall of 2022.

=== Local or regional dispersal ===
J. coenia appears to readily migrate on a local scale between patches that are connected by corridors over those that are not connected by corridors. They could also affect large scale immigration by making patches more accessible to immigrating butterflies if they are connected by corridors as opposed to if they are unconnected. As a result, this would play a role in increasing the population densities of these habitats, which would then affect resource availability for affected individuals.

== Enemies ==
=== Predators ===
Predators for these organisms include ants, wasps, birds, and small animals. Predators appear to select larvae that feed on artificial diets deprived of iridoid glycoside (iridoid glycoside poor) rather than those that consume organic leaf material (iridoid glycoside rich larvae), which may indicate the role of iridoid glycoside consumption. This selection then favors larvae that have diets including iridoid glycosides as well as females who oviposition on those sites by providing offspring with necessary defense mechanisms.

==== Defense effect on predators ====
Prey which contain iridoid glycosides can affect invertebrate predators differently. Chemical differences as a result of leaf age can affect the development of these butterflies, which can then affect the quality of these butterflies as food sources for spiders. One such observation indicated that iridoid glycosides may diminish growth of predators so that predators select for caterpillars that do not feed on iridoid glycoside-rich substrates. Iridoid glycosides have been shown to stimulate growth in prey while decreasing growth in predators, which may then be responsible for its role in providing chemical protection to butterflies.

=== Virus ===
The densovirus Junonia coenia infects the common buckeye larvae by focusing on targeting dividing cells in order to propagate. It consists of single stranded DNA genomes with a smooth, sphere-shaped capsid. It is from the family Parvoviridae and has been considered a potential insecticide, as is hypothesized for other one-species densoviruses. The Junonia coenia densovirus is unique in its separation of DNA strands for structural proteins versus nonstructural proteins.

=== Parasites ===
High intake of iridoid glycosides by J. coenia can have a negative effect on their immune response. This can then lead to higher susceptibility to parasitoids as well as a decreased ability to resist parasitism. Therefore, it is necessary to balance the chemical defense provided by these secondary metabolites with their immunological cost that correlates with increased risk of parasitism. Specifically, secondary metabolites may be hindering the immune response by operating through decreased melanization. This becomes even more problematic since parasitism is a prominent cause of mortality for caterpillars. This relationship exemplifies the vulnerable host hypothesis.

=== Immunity ===
Common predators of J. coenia larvae are ants, and chemical defense appears to be a strong survival mechanism for these organisms against predation. The concentration of iridoid glycoside sequestered by larvae seems to be a strong predictor for the decreased likelihood that they will be predated.

== Physiology ==
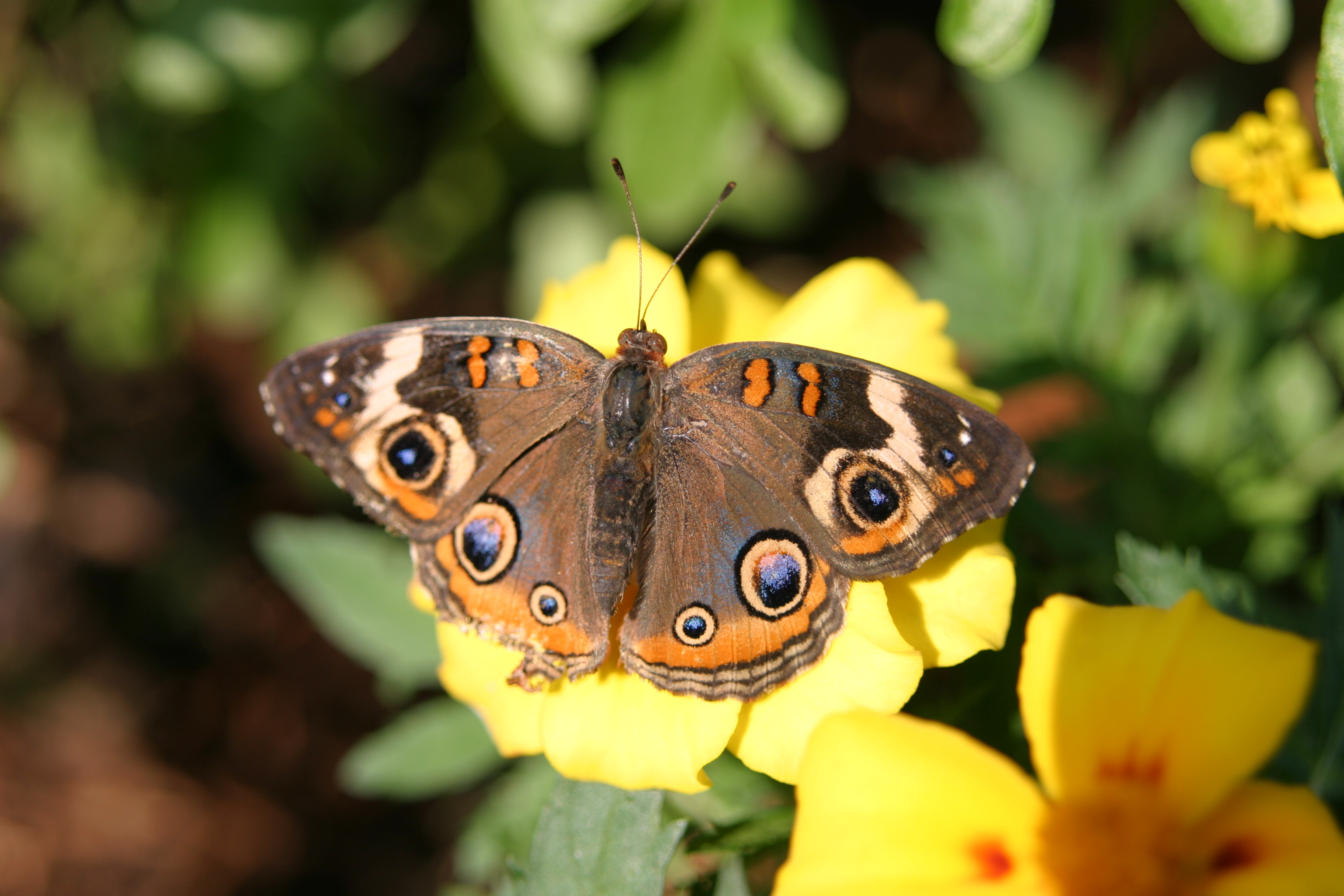
Common buckeye butterfly feeding behavior

=== Gustation (taste) ===
In order to find a host plant for oviposition, females search for appropriate concentrations of catalpol or iridoid glycosides. Therefore, they practice drumming, which allows them to pierce the plant exterior and 'taste' the variety of allelochemicals that are present within its structure. This can be detected through the female J. coenia foretarsal chemoreceptors.

== Protective coloration and behavior ==
=== Automimicry ===
Larvae also appear to weakly adopt automimicry as a survival strategy. In the presence of caterpillars that have sequestered iridoids (making them unpalatable to predators) and those that have not sequestered iridoids (making them palatable to predators), unpalatable caterpillars are able to escape predation. However, this trend is a weak example because it also may be the consequence of predators entirely avoiding this species of caterpillars rather than predators rejecting caterpillars.

== Common buckeye in popular culture ==
The common buckeye was featured on the 2006 United States Postal Service 24-cent postage stamp.
