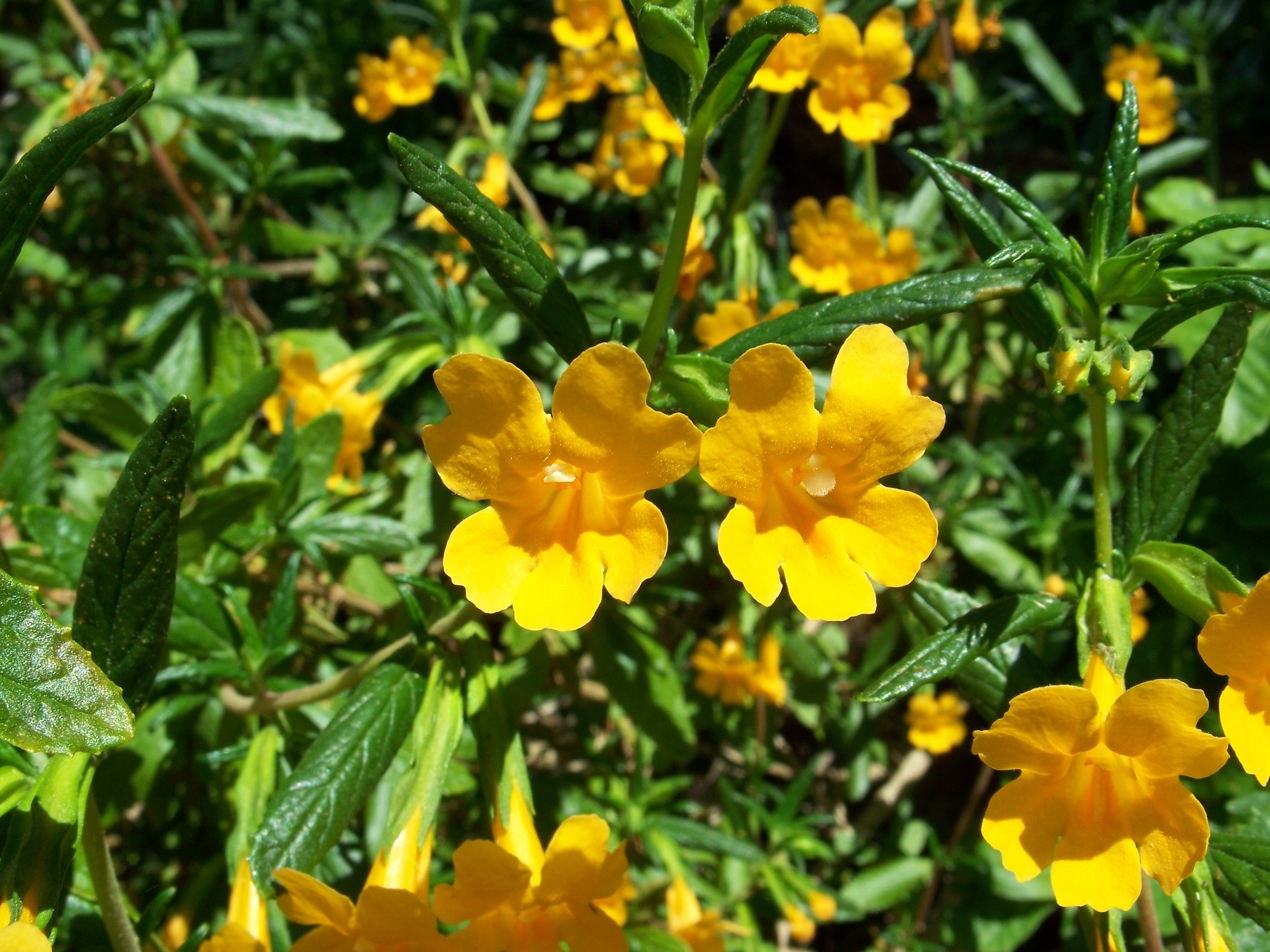

Conservation status
- Secure (NatureServe)

Scientific classification
- Kingdom: Plantae
- Clade: Embryophytes
- Clade: Tracheophytes
- Clade: Angiosperms
- Clade: Eudicots
- Clade: Asterids
- Order: Lamiales
- Family: Phrymaceae
- Genus: Diplacus
- Species: D. aurantiacus

Binomial name
- Diplacus aurantiacus (Curtis) Jeps.

Synonyms
- Synonymy: Diplacus aurantius G.Don; Diplacus glutinosus (J.C.Wendl.) Nutt.; Diplacus glutinosus var. aurantiacus (Curtis) Lindl.; Diplacus glutinosus var. latifolius (Nutt.) Lindl. & Paxton; Diplacus godronii Verschaff.; Diplacus grandiflorus Greene; Diplacus latifolius Nutt.; Diplacus leptanthus Nutt.; Diplacus longiflorus var. grandiflorus Jeps.; Diplacus splendidus Verschaff.; Diplacus verschaffeltii Verschaff.; Mimulus aurantiacus Curtis; Mimulus aurantiacus var. splendens J.Muir; Mimulus glutinosus J.C.Wendl.; Mimulus leptanthus (Nutt.) A.L.Grant ex L.H.Bailey; Mimulus meteor J.Muir; Mimulus viscosus Moench; Mimulus wilsonii D.Don ex Steud.

= Diplacus aurantiacus =

Species of flowering plant

Diplacus aurantiacus, the sticky monkey-flower or orange bush monkey-flower, is a flowering plant that grows in a subshrub form, native to western North America from southwestern Oregon south through Northern and Central California. It is a member of the lopseed family, Phrymaceae, and was formerly known as Mimulus aurantiacus.

== Description ==
Diplacus aurantiacus grows up to 1.2 meters (4 feet) tall, has deep green, sticky leaves 3 to 7 centimeters long and up to a centimeter broad and flowering stems that grow vertically. The flowers are tubular at the base and about 2 centimeters long with five broad lobes; they occur in a variety of shades from white to red, the most common color being a light orange. They are honey plants pollinated by bees and hummingbirds.

It grows in many climates and will thrive in many types of soil, wet, dry, sandy, or rocky. It even grows in serpentine, a soil that most plants have difficulty thriving in because of its unique mineral composition.

Diplacus aurantiacus is an important host plant for the larvae of the common buckeye butterfly (Junonia coenia) and the variable checkerspot (Euphydryas chalcedona), despite a phenolic resin in the leaves which deter its feeding. This resin also helps the plant retain water in dry environments.

== Cultivation ==
This bushy evergreen shrub can be short-lived in cultivation. The species and its cultivars are used in water conserving, native plant, and habitat gardens. It is often grown under glass in temperate zones. In the UK it has won the Royal Horticultural Society's Award of Garden Merit.

== Traditional Native American medical plant ==
The Miwok and Pomo Native Americans used the plant to treat minor ailments such as sores, burns, diarrhea, and eye irritation. They used the colorful flowers for decorative purposes.

== Ecology ==
Diplacus aurantiacus supports multiple species of caterpillars, including the Variable Checkerspot, and also supports hummingbirds.

== Gallery ==
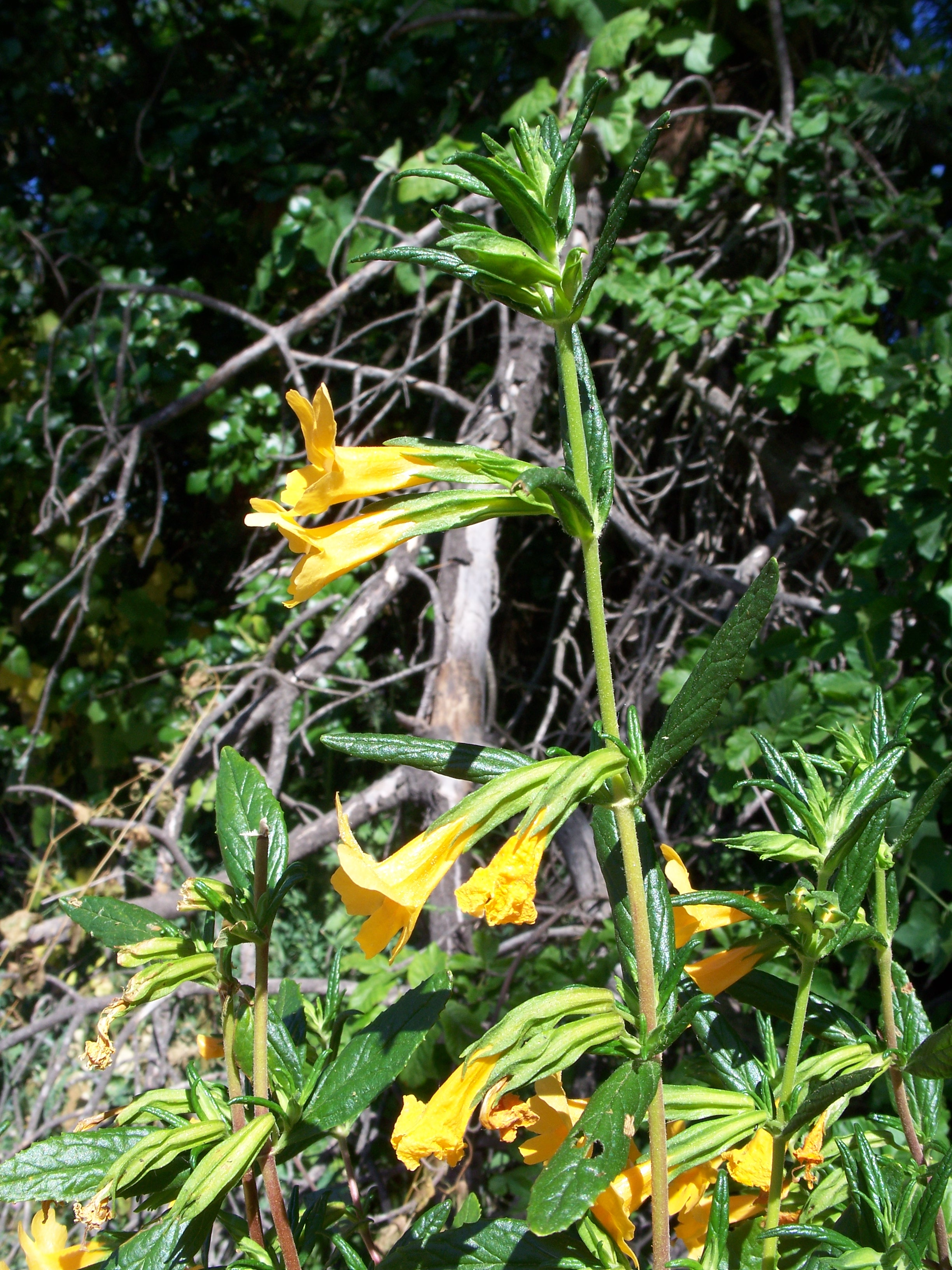
Side view of flowers

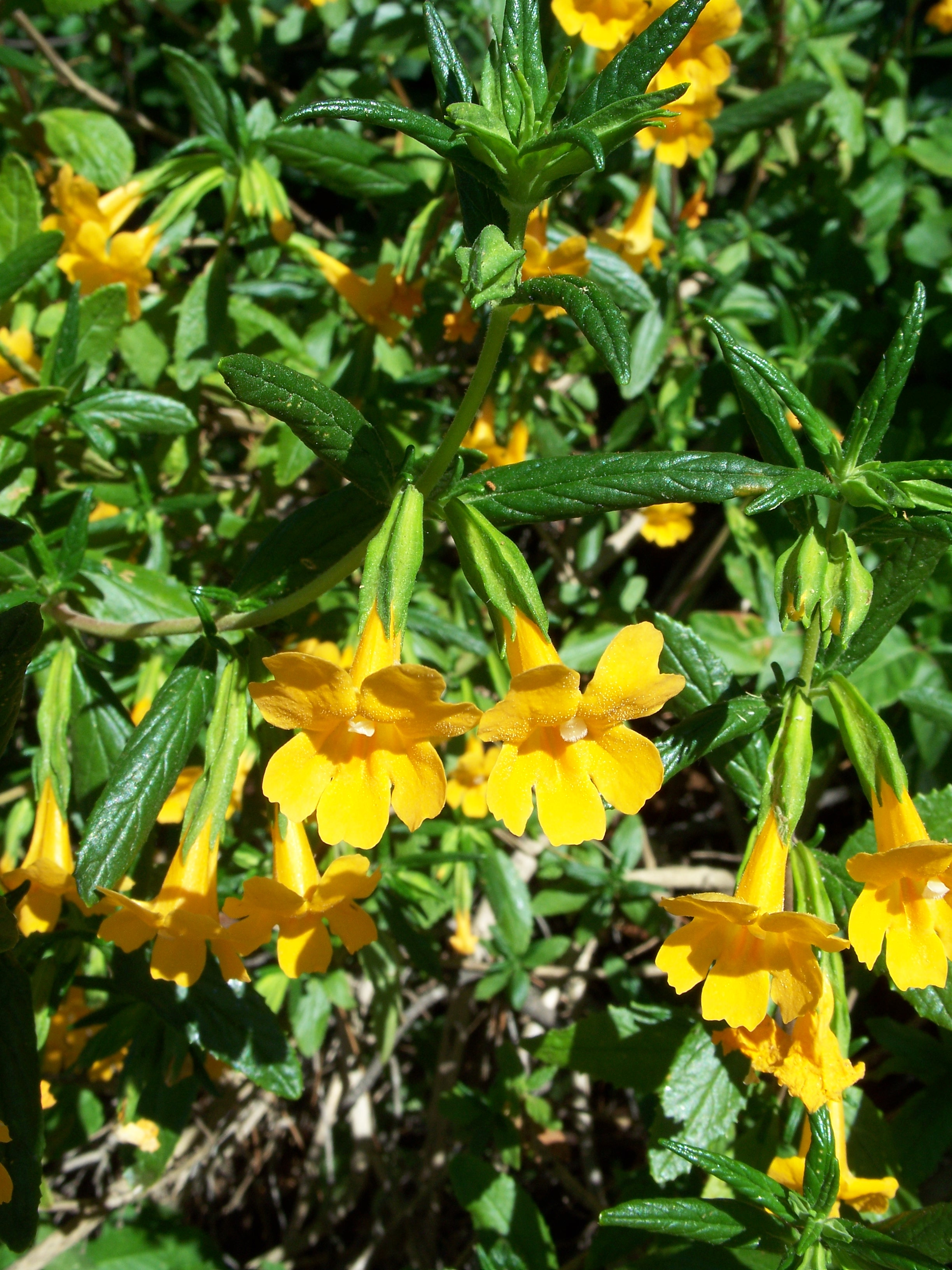
Bright orange flowers

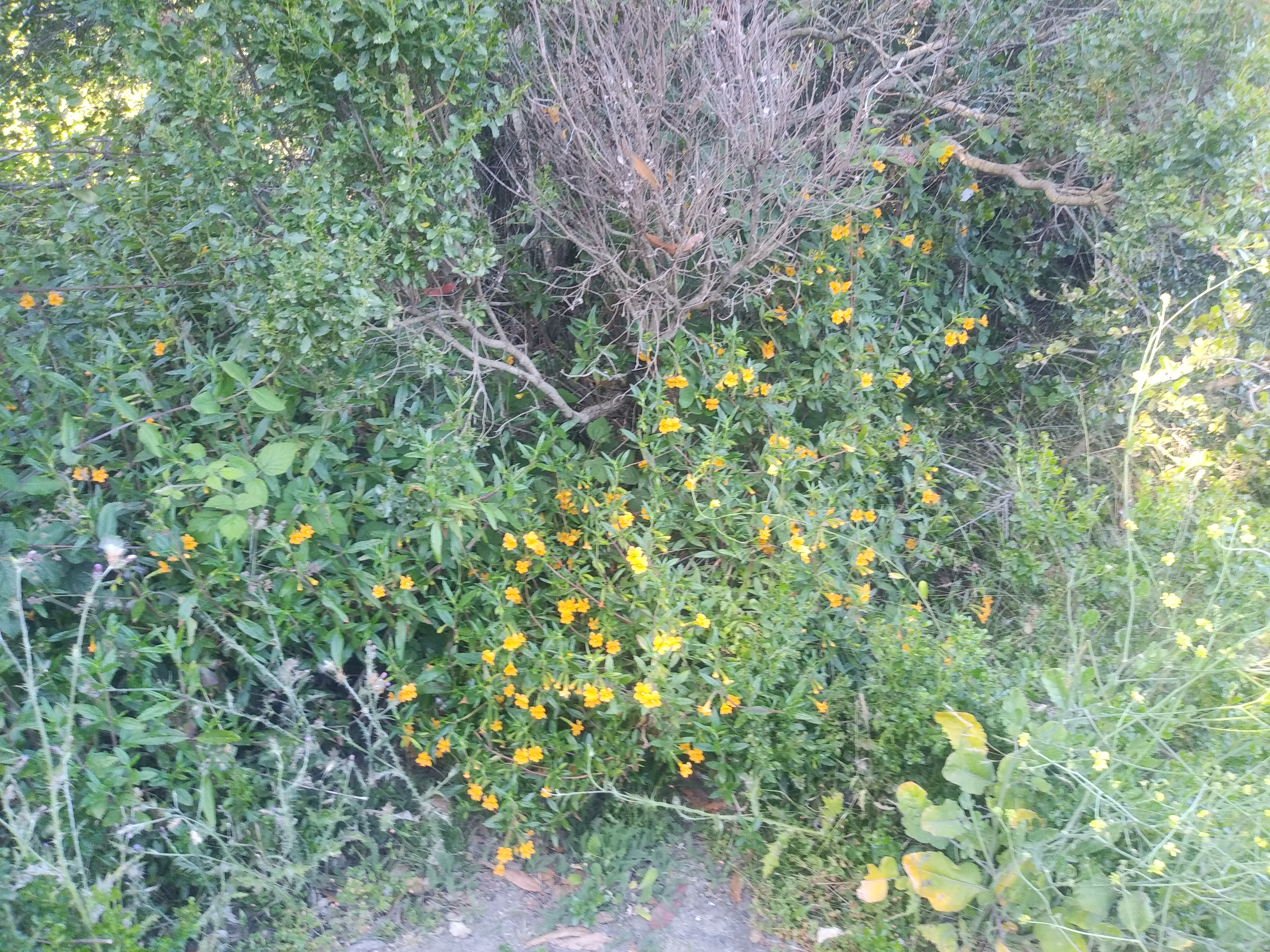
In Wildcat Canyon park.

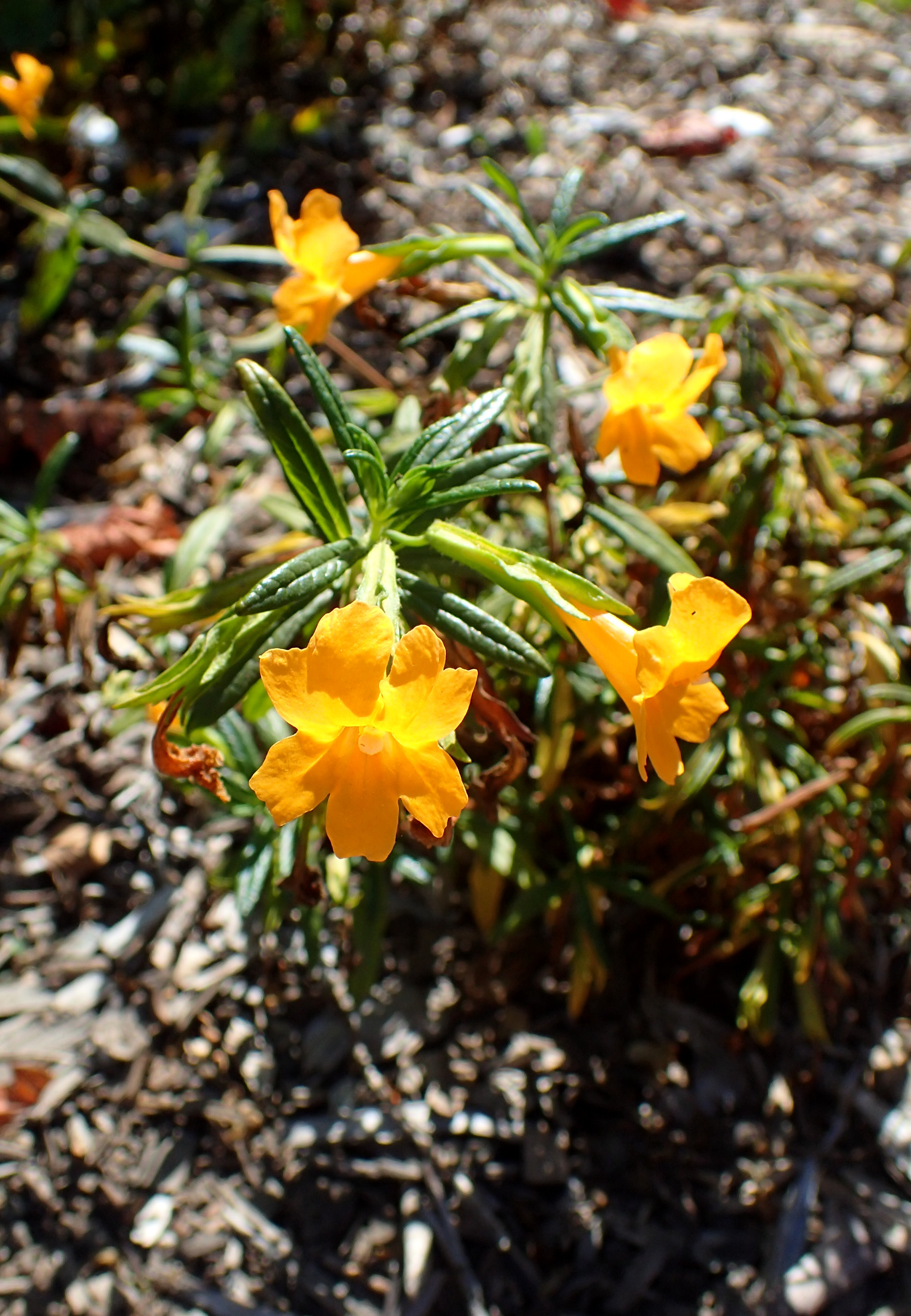
Detail of flowers

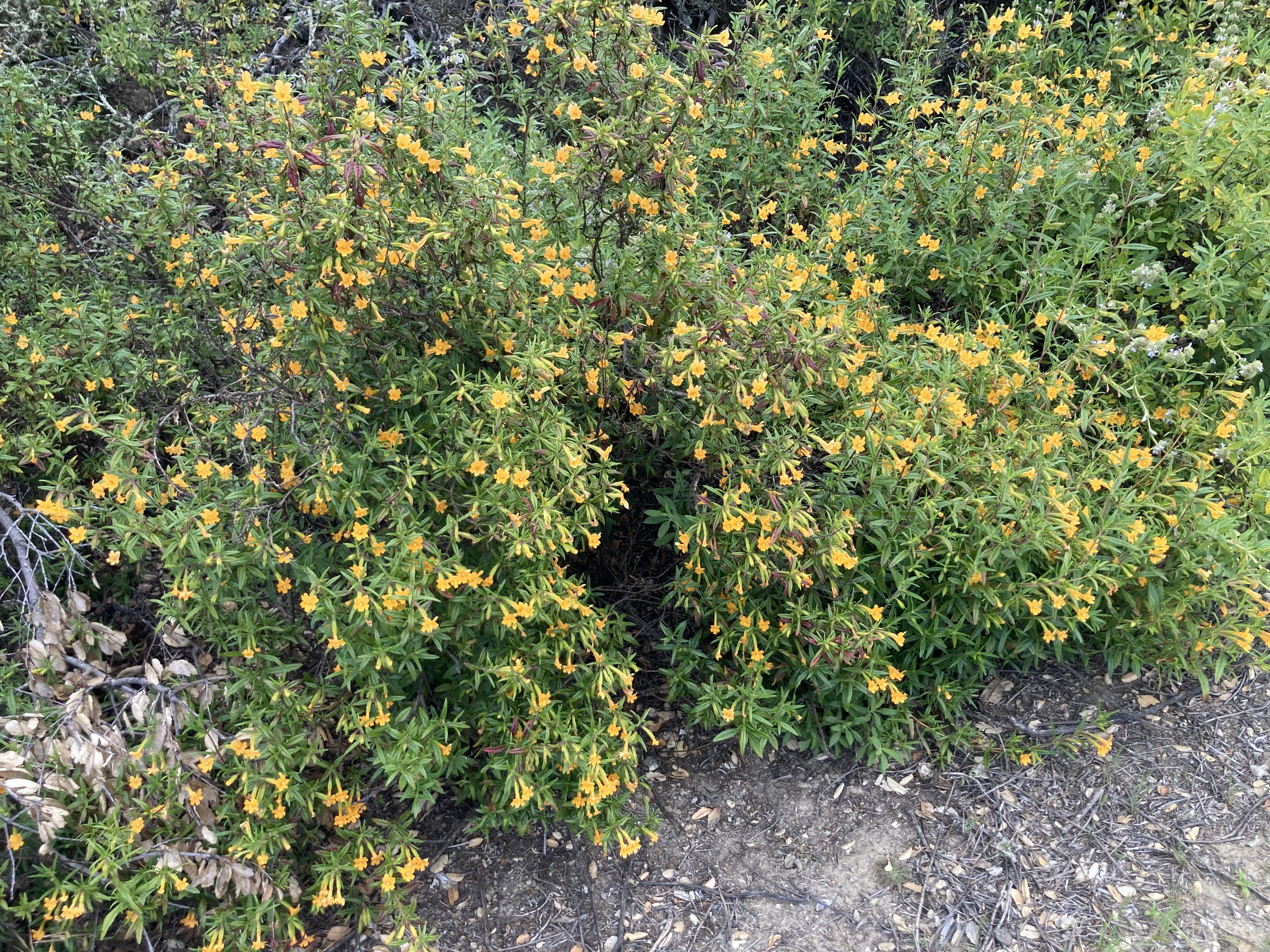
Bush can spread over a large area

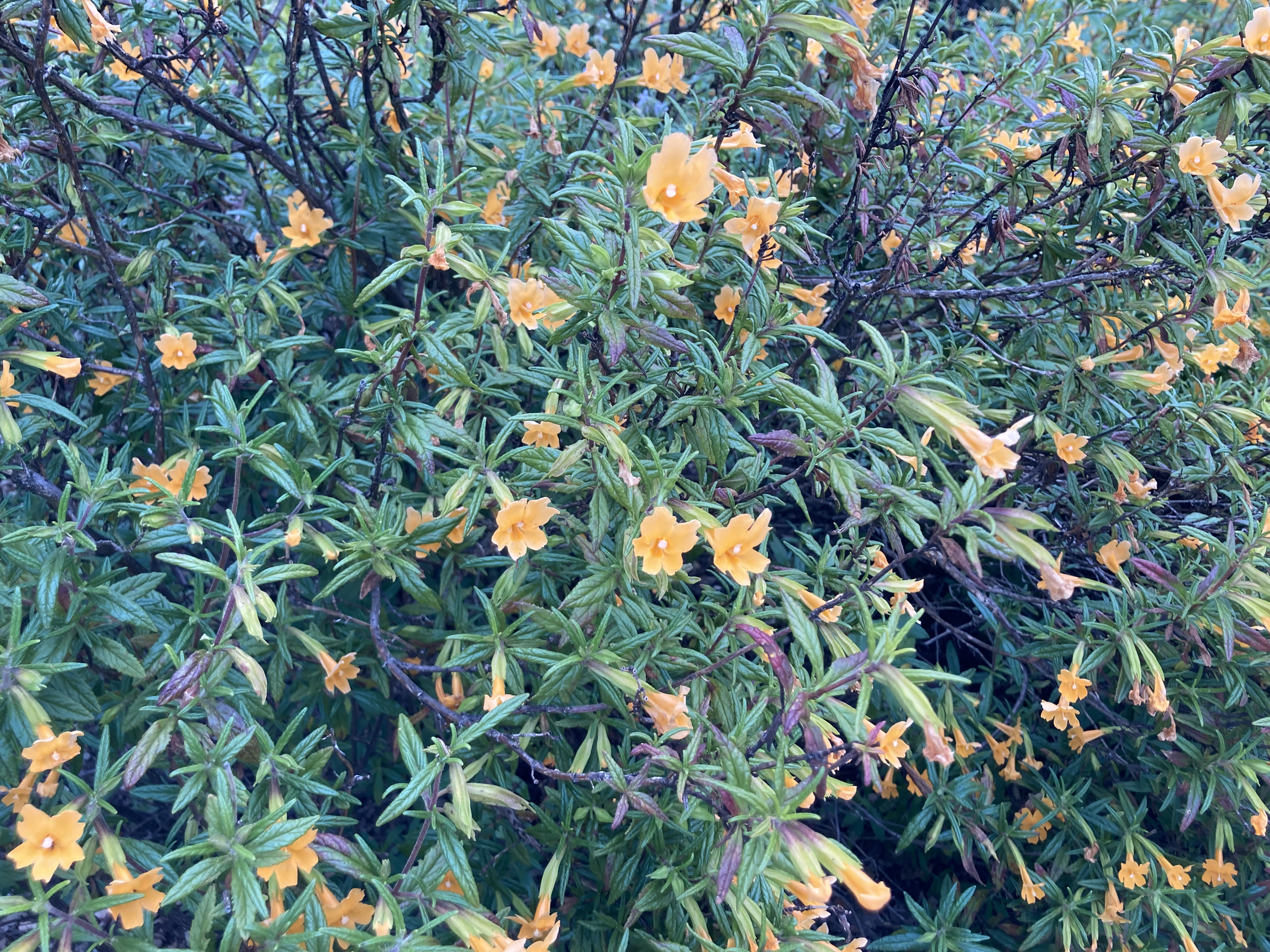
At Briones Regional Park.
