= Blue toadflax =

List of plants with the same or similar names

Blue toadflax is a common name of two species of plant:

- Nuttallanthus canadensis, also Canadian toadflax
- Nuttallanthus texanus, also Texas toadflax
