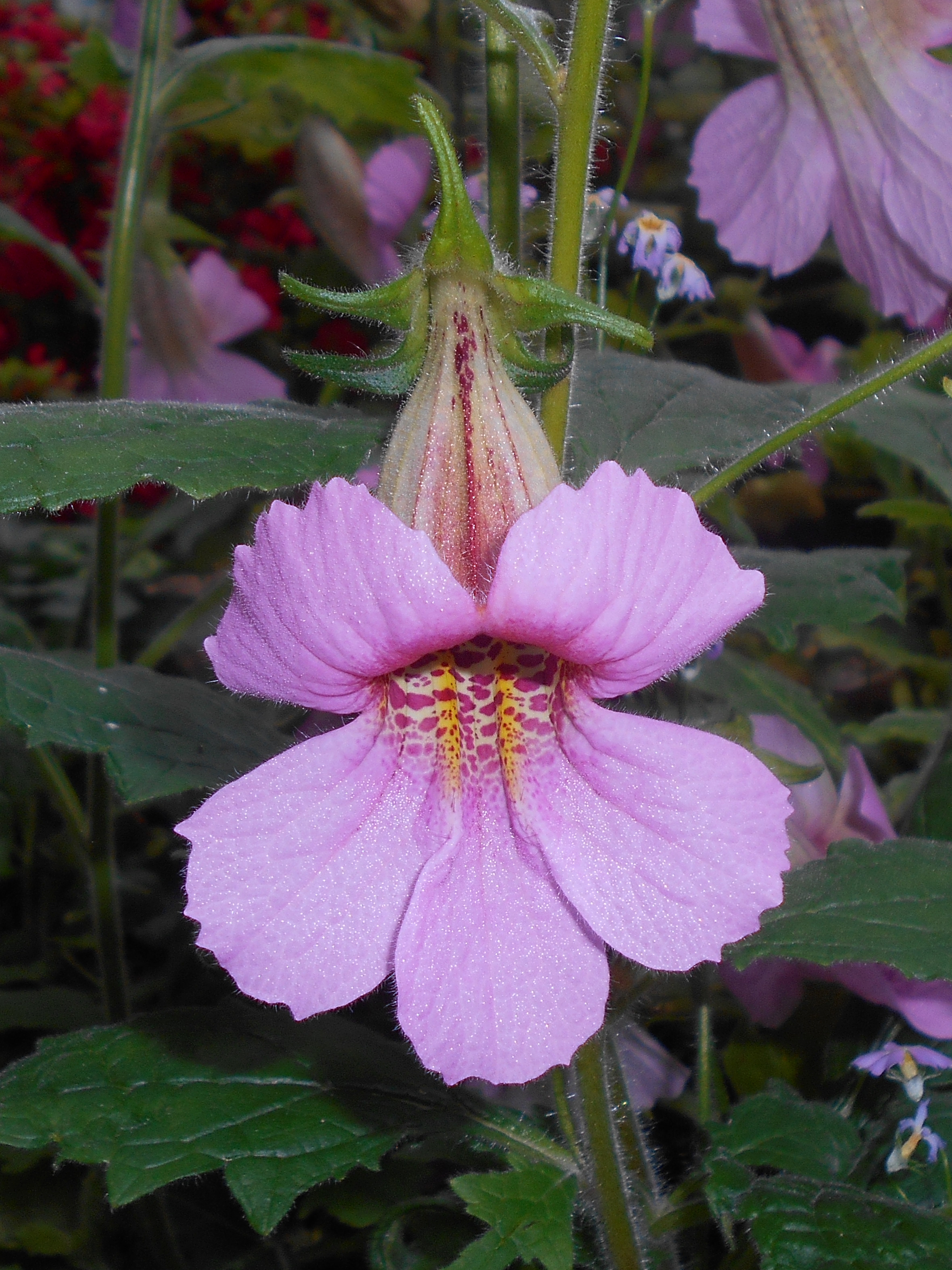

Scientific classification
- Kingdom: Plantae
- Clade: Tracheophytes
- Clade: Angiosperms
- Clade: Eudicots
- Clade: Asterids
- Order: Lamiales
- Family: Orobanchaceae
- Genus: Rehmannia
- Species: R. elata

Binomial name
- Rehmannia elata N.E.Br. ex Prain

= Rehmannia elata =

Species of flowering plant

Rehmannia elata, the Chinese foxglove, is a species of flowering plant in the family Orobanchaceae, native to China. Growing to 150 cm (59 in) tall by 50 cm (20 in) broad, it is an herbaceous perennial with veined, hairy leaves and pink, tubular flowers with darker pink stripes in summer. The flowers bear a superficial resemblance to foxgloves, hence the common name "Chinese foxglove", which is also applied to the whole genus. However this species is not closely related to the true foxglove (Digitalis).

The plant has gained the Royal Horticultural Society's Award of Garden Merit.

The specific epithet elata means "tall".

== Gallery ==
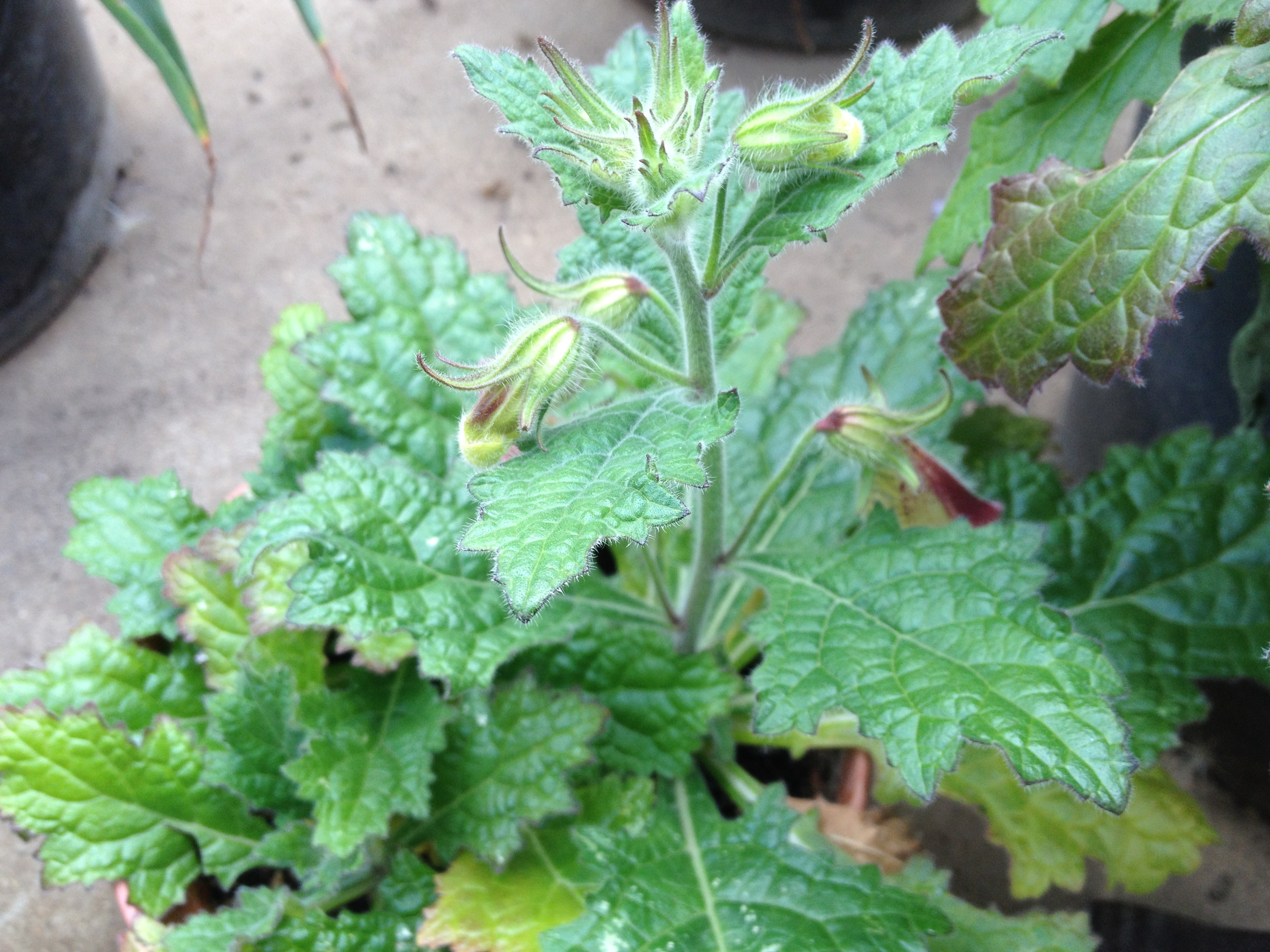

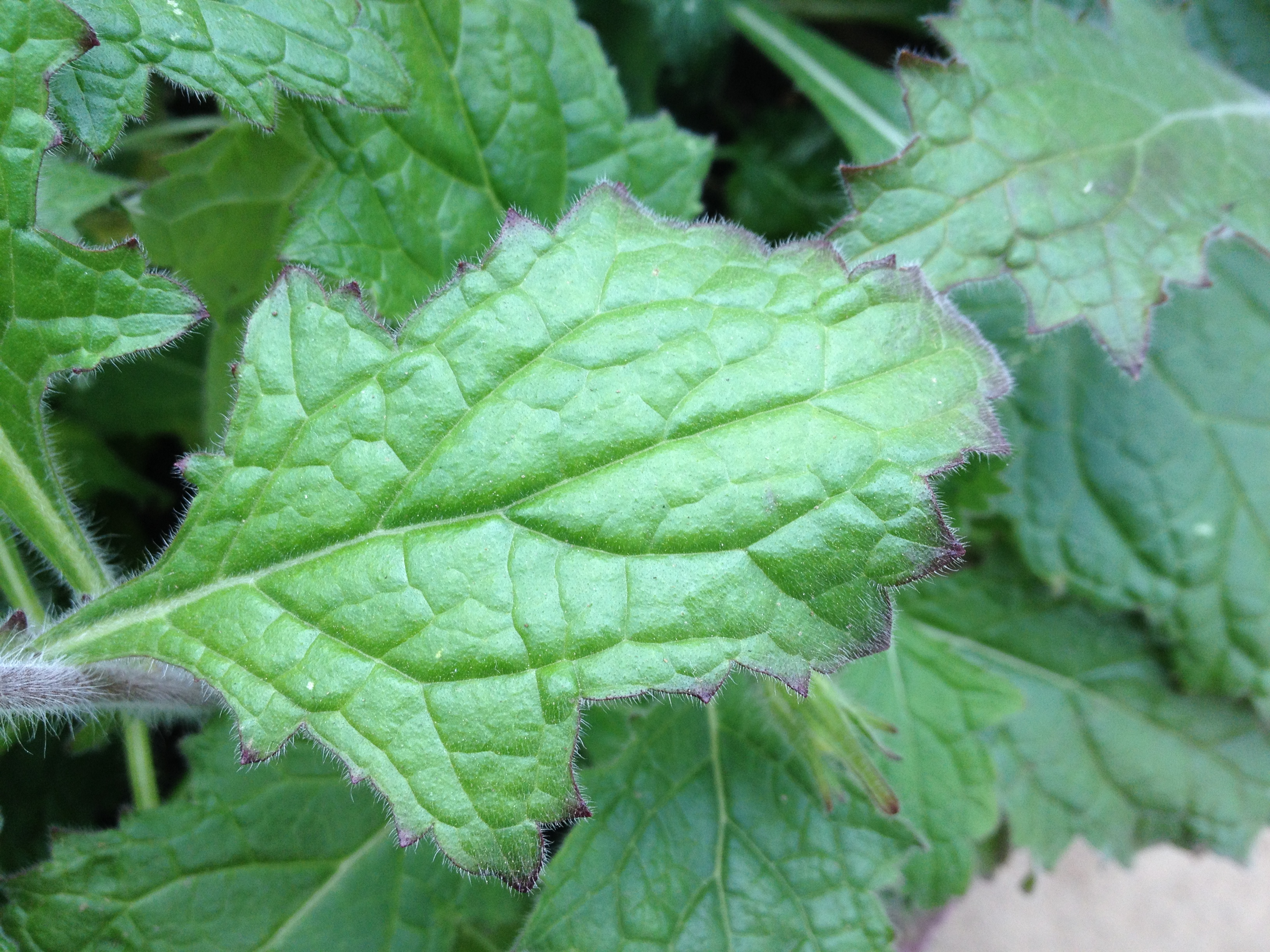
