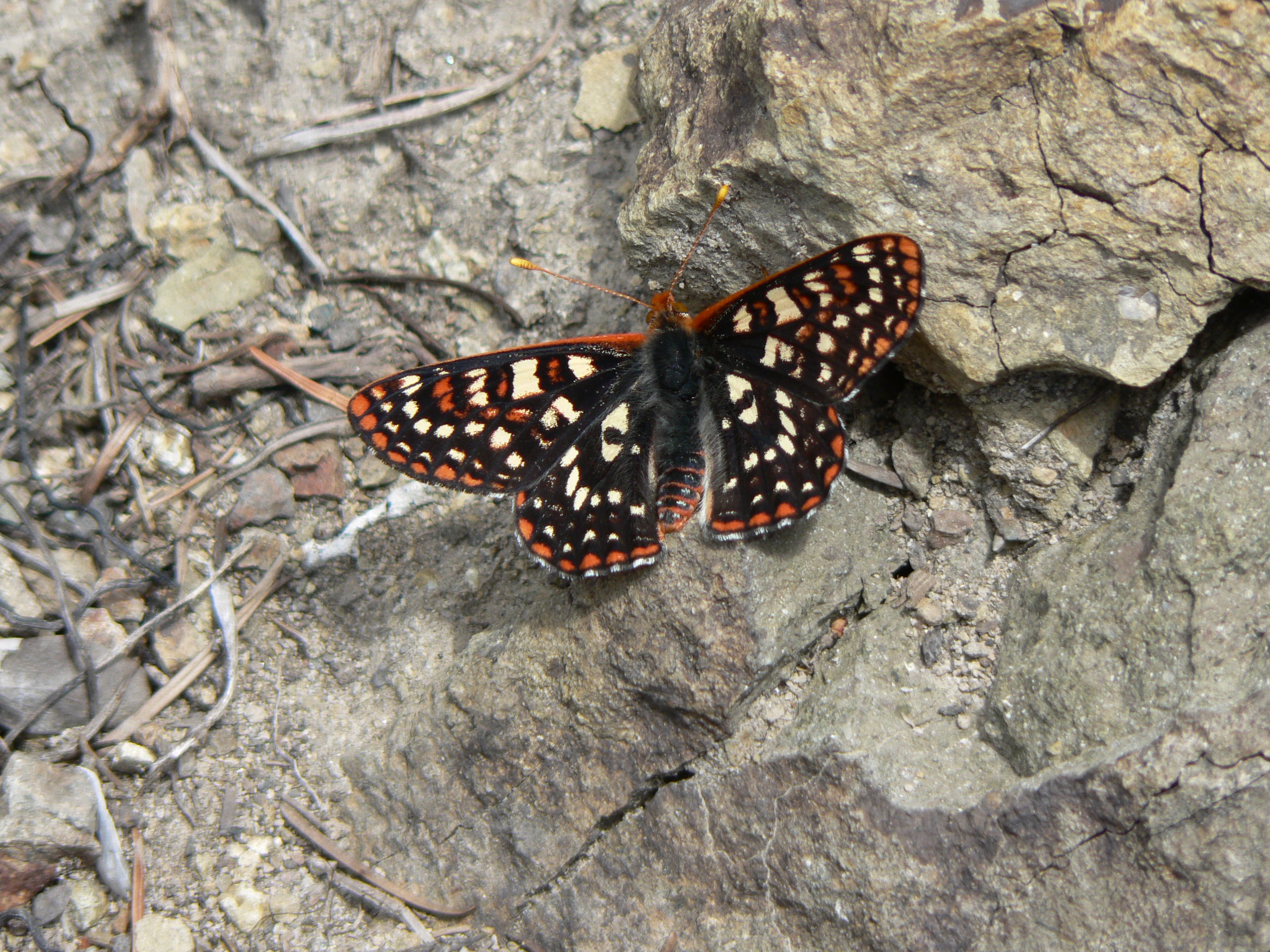
- In the William O. Douglas Wilderness

Scientific classification
- Kingdom: Animalia
- Phylum: Arthropoda
- Clade: Pancrustacea
- Class: Insecta
- Order: Lepidoptera
- Family: Nymphalidae
- Genus: Euphydryas
- Species: E. chalcedona

Binomial name
- Euphydryas chalcedona (Doubleday, 1847)

= Variable checkerspot =

Species of butterfly

The variable checkerspot or Chalcedon checkerspot (Euphydryas chalcedona) is a butterfly in the family Nymphalidae. It is found in western North America, where its range stretches from Alaska in the north to Baja California in the south and extends east through the Rocky Mountains into Colorado, Montana, New Mexico and Wyoming. The butterfly is usually brown or black with extensive white and yellow checkering and some red coloration on the dorsal wing. Adult wingspan is 3.2–5.7 cm (1.3–2.2 in). Adult butterflies feed on nectar from flowers while larvae feed on a variety of plants including snowberry (Symphoricarpos), paintbrush (Castilleja), Buddleja, Diplacus aurantiacus and Scrophularia californica.

During the breeding period, males congregate around larval host plants to encounter females. Males court female butterflies via physical displays. Successful courtship leads to copulation, when the male deposits a nutrient-rich spermatophore in the female. In addition, males also secrete a mating plug during copulation that hinders the ability of females to mate with other males.

Pregnant females look for host plants like Diplacus aurantiacus that are close to nectar sources when they lay their eggs. The larvae that emerge from the eggs feed and live on these host plants, some of which have developed strategies to deter larvae from eating their leaves. After moving to a darker and more secluded site, larvae enter diapause, emerging between January and March with pupation usually beginning in April.

The variable checkerspot is a potential food source for many avian predators. Due to a larval diet rich in catalpol, this butterfly has developed a strategy of unpalatability to deter avian predation. In addition, coloring plays a part in the defense strategy of the butterfly; intense red coloration deters predators from attacking them.

== Taxonomy ==
The variable checkerspot is a member of the order Lepidoptera, which contains the butterflies and the moths. It belongs to the family Nymphalidae, which also includes the tortoiseshells and the admirals. The variable checkerspot is part of the genus Euphydryas, which contains other checkerspot butterflies like Euphydryas editha and Euphydryas phaeton. There are ten subspecies of Euphydryas chalcedona. Additional information is required to determine the conservation status of some subspecies.

== Description ==
The variable checkerspot is usually brown-black with extensive yellow, red and white spots on the dorsal wing. Their underside usually contains yellow and orange bands. However, as its name suggests, the butterfly is highly variable in appearance. Dorsal color can range from a brick-red background with brown and yellow markings in Sierra populations to yellow and black in northern Californian populations. Adult wingspan is 3.2–5.7 cm (1.3–2.2 in). The species is visually similar to Euphydryas anicia, with the only notable difference being their male genitalia.

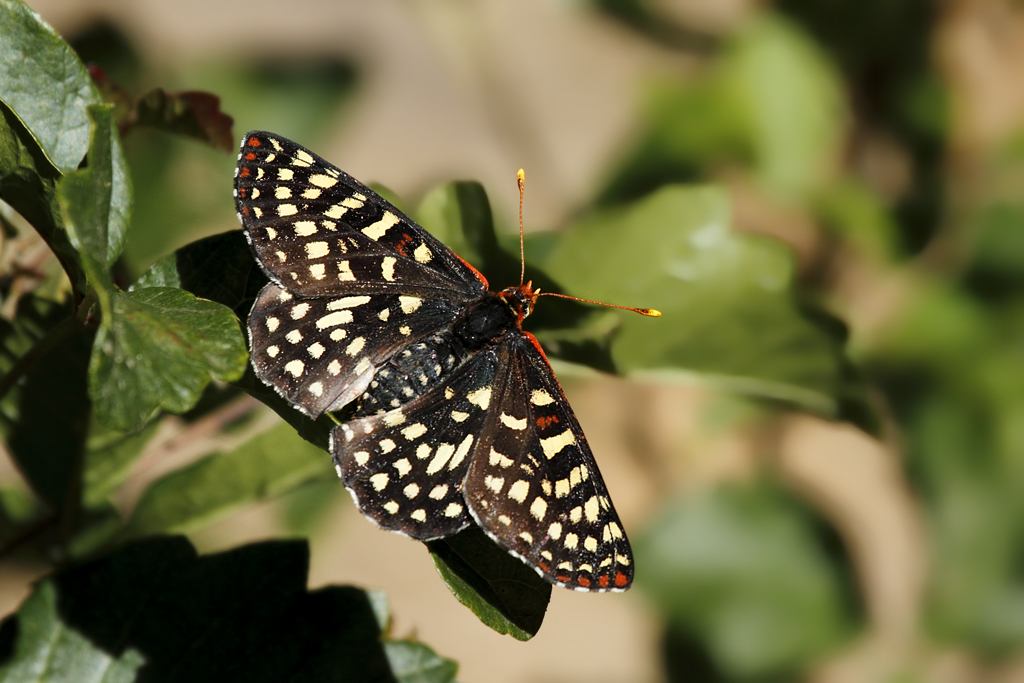
Adult variable checkerspot perching on a leaf

== Distribution and habitat ==
The variable checkerspot is found across western North America, ranging from Alaska in the north to Baja California and Mexico in the south. Its habitat is bounded to the west by the Pacific Ocean and it extends east past the Rocky Mountains into Montana, Wyoming, Colorado and New Mexico.

The butterfly's habitat encompasses a large variety of environments, including sagebrush flats, desert hills, prairies, open forests and alpine tundra.

== Life cycle ==
The variable checkerspot lays its eggs in clusters. Pre-diapause larvae often move to fresher parts of the plant in which they are laid to secure a better food source. Before they enter diapause, the larvae leave the food plant to seek better dormancy sites such as under the bark of dead branches, in the hollow stems of dried weeds and in rock crevices.

During diapause, some larvae are able to wake up and feed before re-entering dormancy. The larvae emerge from diapause between late January and mid-March. However, in high elevations, larvae can hibernate for several years. Pupation begins in early to middle April and the adult flight season begins between mid-April and May and continues into June. The adult variable checkerspot has a life span of around 15 days.

== Breeding ==
=== Mate location ===
Male mate-location strategies in the variable checkerspot are primarily determined by female distribution in an area. For species like E. chalcedona that pupate densely on larval food plants, females are most densely distributed near these plants. In addition, virgin females, the most desirable mates for male butterflies, are most often found near larval host plants. Male mate-locating behavior has evolved to maximize encounters with virgin females and thus male variable checkerspot butterflies thus primarily use larval food plants as encounter sites for possible female mates. Males both perch near food plants and fly around them in order to look for fertilizable females. Male butterflies do not stay in one encounter site for long and do not typically defend the territory of their encounter site. Males depend on visual rather than chemical cues to locate females.

=== Courtship ===
To start courtship, the male arrives in the vicinity of a fertilizable female, who quickly moves to the ground or to vegetation. The male follows and attempts to copulate with the female by curling his abdomen forward along the side of his body and inserting it between the female's hindwings. At this point, the female may stay still or flutter her wings and move away. If the female moves away, the male follows her and repeats his attempts to copulate. Only when the female stops and remains motionless can the male successfully copulate with her. In unsuccessful courtships, the female either flies away or rapidly flutters her wings until the male departs. Courtship in the variable checkerspot lacks an obvious male display such as the release of chemical signals by the male. Successful courtship in E. chalcedona lasts about a minute.

=== Copulation ===
Once a male has successfully courted a female, the pair begins to copulate. Copulations typically last around an hour, although prolonged copulations as long as six hours have been observed in the wild. During copulation, the male fills the female's bursa copulatrix with material that forms the spermatophore, a nutrient-rich complex that delivers the sperm to the female. On average, the spermatophore represents 7% of the male’s body weight.

This weight proportion is similar to that of other butterflies whose mating systems resemble that of the variable checkerspot, indicating that males in these species give roughly similar nutrient investments to their mates. While producing the spermatophore is a costly endeavor for the male, evidence indicates that the spermatophore is not a paternal investment in offspring. In fact, the size of the spermatophore produced by a male is not correlated with the reproductive success of his female mate in terms of the number of eggs she lays and the percentage of those eggs that hatch.

Paternal investment via the spermatophore in E. chalcedona may be less important than in other butterfly species due to the severe time constraints on female variable checkerspot butterflies to lay their eggs quickly. Because of these constraints, female butterflies emerge with all oocytes present and some eggs already containing yolk, thus limiting the role of the spermatophore in promoting female reproductive success.

=== Harassment ===
Female availability is an important factor in determining mating systems. Because the breeding period of the variable checkerspot is brief, female availability is limited by time as well as by space. Male butterflies in other species with brief female availability have developed strategies that ensure quick access to fertilizable females, leading to high levels of male harassment. This sexual harassment has led mated females in other species of butterfly to gather in areas of lower male density, since consistent harassment could negatively impact the time females have to search for food sources and lay eggs.

However, this potential for harassment does not influence egg distribution by mated females in E. chalcedona. Variable checkerspot eggs are always distributed around good larval food sources, regardless of the level of male harassment at those sites.

=== Mating plugs ===
Female butterflies regularly mate more than once. Females can internally store the sperm of many males at one time, but the sperm of the most recently mated male is the one that usually fertilizes the female. While seeking out multiple mates can lead to increased parasite exposure and predation risk, female butterflies can often benefit from remating by receiving more material resources from males and increasing the genetic diversity of their offspring. Virgin females are found to engage in remating behavior more frequently than recently mated females.

Remating behavior by a female harms her most previous mate, who could lose his paternity if another male's sperm fertilizes the female. Thus, after males produce the spermatophore, they pass an additional gland secretion that spills out of the female's copulatory opening, forming a mating plug that hardens within a few hours of copulation. As the female variable checkerspot has two genital openings, this secretion does not impact oviposition ability. The mating plug protects the male's paternity by acting as a mechanical barrier to reinsemination by preventing other males from penetrating the female.

== Group behavior ==
During the flight season, large groups of variable checkerspot butterflies can be found across western North America. Individual butterflies are capable of recognizing suitable areas rich in larval food plants and do not usually linger in other parts of the landscape. This leads to populations of butterflies that are small, isolated and clearly separated from other populations. Females do not fly as much as males, who frequently fly around their habitats and perch in open areas while searching for female mates.

Flight times for the variable checkerspot vary regionally. Usually, the flight season lasts from April to June in California and Oregon, while it normally takes place from June to July farther north and in higher elevations.

== Diet ==
The diet of the variable checkerspot changes dramatically with development: the larva has an herbivorous diet consisting entirely of plants while the adult butterfly feeds exclusively on nectar.

=== Larval diet ===
The principal food source for variable checkerspot larvae are the leaves of the flowering subshrub Diplacus aurantiacus that also usually serve as its host plant. D. aurantiacus contains large amounts of a leaf phenolic resin, which helps resist water loss during drought. Laboratory and field studies have shown that increased resin content is negatively correlated to the growth and survivorship of variable checkerspot larvae, indicating that the phenolic resin in D. aurantiacus plays in important role in deterring larvae from feeding on leaves.

Another factor in D. aurantiacus plants that impacts larval growth is leaf nitrogen content. Unlike resin levels, heightened nitrogen levels are correlated with increased larval growth and survivorship. In a controlled experiment, larva that were fed a diet of fertilized D. aurantiacus plants, which contained 50% more nitrogen than unfertilized plants, experienced higher survival rates and growth than larvae that fed on unfertilized plants. While leaves with increased nitrogen content are the most attractive for the larvae, they are also the most valuable carbon-gainers for the plant. This leads to the activity patterns of larvae and D. aurantiacus plants synchronizing. Larvae emerge from diapause as D. aurantiacus plants start flowering. This is when the plants need the most carbon. The plants then concentrate their resin in their youngest leaves, which contain the largest amount of nitrogen; this resin deterrent forces larvae to feed on less valuable older leaves whose nitrogen content is lower. To maximize their own nutritional benefits, larvae selectively eat leaves with the highest available nitrogen:resin ratio. In addition, larvae exhibit a strong preference for feeding on host plant leaves that have been in the sun compared to leaves that have been in the shade.

Another less common host plant for variable checkerspot larvae is Scrophularia californica, which lacks the resin defense system found in D. aurantiacus and is thus easier for larvae to digest. Larvae that feed on S. californica grow faster and larger than those that feed on D. aurantiacus. While D. aurantiacus may not be the most nutritious food for the larvae, it is the most reliable and widespread host available to the variable checkerspot and is often the plant closest to nectar sources, leading to its role as principal host plant and food source for the larvae.

=== Adult diet ===
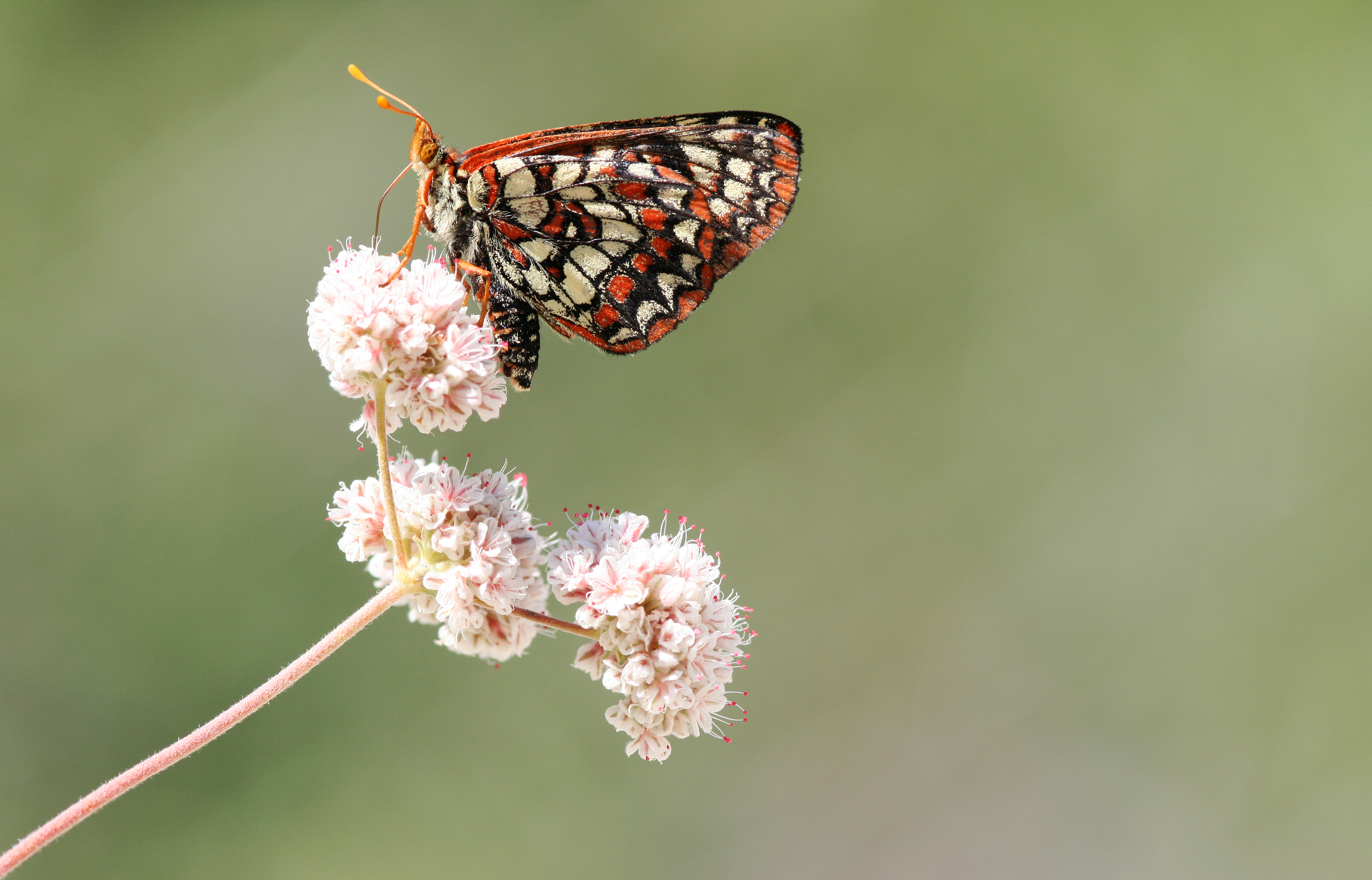
Adult butterfly obtaining nectar

In contrast to the herbivorous diet of the larva, the adult variable checkerspot's main food source is the nectar it obtains from flowers. In Jasper Ridge Biological Preserve in California, an extremely well studied site, the nectar source most frequently used by adult butterflies is Eriodictyon californicum.

=== Diet and oviposition ===
The diet of the adult butterfly has a large impact on the choice of D. aurantiacus as the oviposition site and larval host of the variable checkerspot. Adult butterflies prefer to oviposit on host sites that are close to nectar sources. In the Jasper Ridge site, D. aurantiacus is the host plant closest to the E. californicum nectar source. This proximity advantage overcomes its nutritional deficiencies compared to other host plants and leads to it being the principal host plant of variable checkerspot butterflies.

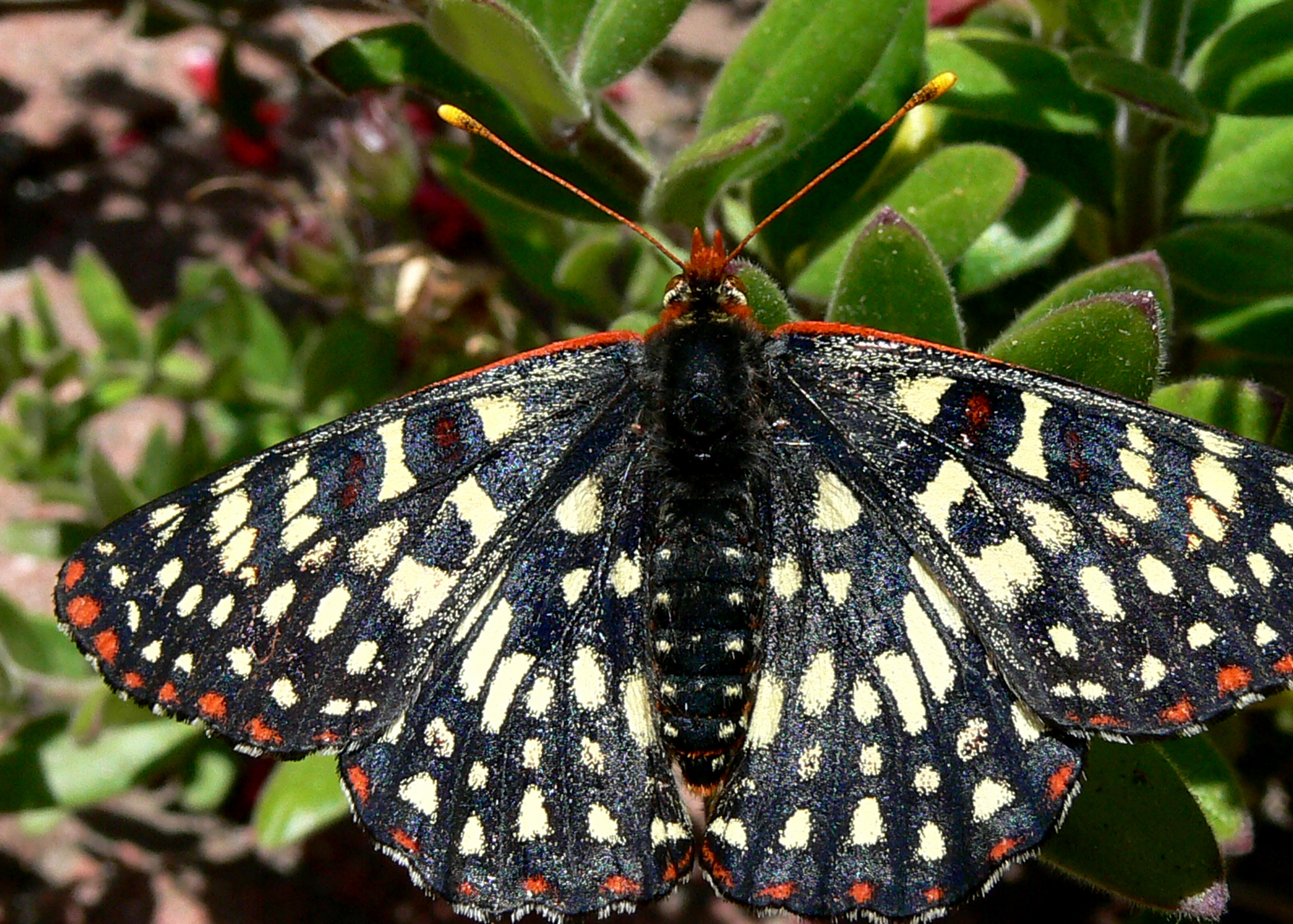
Adult variable checkerspot

== Predation and defense ==
The variable checkerspot's main predators are birds. Populations of the variable checkerspot, like most lepidopterans, are usually scarcely distributed and thus direct observation of avian predation on butterflies is rare.

One study analyzed the evidence of avian predation on the butterflies by the presence of a large number of detached variable checkerspot wings at a butterfly population center. These detached wings exhibited beak marks and characteristic triangular tears indicating that birds attacked the butterflies and detached their wings before eating the body. In addition to the remains of this successful predation, photographs of variable checkerspot butterflies show some individuals that exhibit beak marks and tears, indicating unsuccessful avian predation attempts.

Analysis of the avian predation on the variable checkerspot population has found that predators disproportionately attack female butterflies. This is because attacks are concentrated on butterflies that contain less intense red coloration. The male butterfly exhibits more variation in its coloration than the female, and can be more intensely red colored. This means that on average, females face more attacks than males do. Red serves as a warning color in many species of butterfly, so it is possible that diminished avian predation is linked to this warning signal. Indeed, the pressure exerted on the variable checkerspot by visually hunting avian predators may play an important role in the evolution of its wing coloration and pattern.

=== Defense strategy ===
The variable checkerspot, like many other butterflies, has developed a defense strategy of unpalatability to birds as a means of resisting predation. In a controlled experiment, would-be avian predators often exhibit head-shaking and beak-wiping behavior after killing a variable checkerspot, characteristic of tasting unpalatable prey. The unpleasant taste of the butterfly is likely due to the presence of iridoid glycoside compounds in the scrophulariaceous plants that make up the majority of its larval diet.

==== Iridoid glycosides ====
The main iridoid glycoside found in the diet of variable checkerspot butterflies is catalpol. Chemical analysis has shown that the only iridoid glycoside present in adult butterflies is catalpol. Because they are essential for the larvae to develop an unpalatable taste to birds, iridoids act as larval feeding stimulants. Given a choice between a diet that contains no additives and one that contains iridoid glycoside compounds, larvae exhibit a preference for the diet containing the extra iridoid compounds, using olfactory cues to sense their presence. The primary host plants of the variable checkerspot are all rich in catalpol compounds, and the presence of these compounds plays a fundamental role in determining choice of host plant when females oviposit. This suggests that the variable checkerspot has evolved to use iridoid compounds as female oviposition stimulants as well as larval feeding stimulants.

== See also ==
- Euphydryas editha
