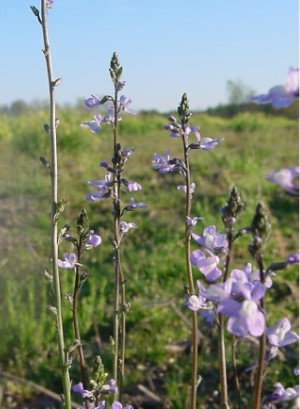
- Nuttallanthus canadensis (Canada toadflax)

Scientific classification
- Kingdom: Plantae
- Clade: Tracheophytes
- Clade: Angiosperms
- Clade: Eudicots
- Clade: Asterids
- Order: Lamiales
- Family: Plantaginaceae
- Tribe: Antirrhineae
- Genus: Nuttallanthus

Species
- Nuttallanthus canadensis; Nuttallanthus floridanus; Nuttallanthus subandinus; Nuttallanthus texanus

= Nuttallanthus =

Genus of flowering plants

Nuttallanthus is a genus of four species of herbaceous annuals and perennials that was traditionally placed in the foxglove family Scrophulariaceae. Due to new genetic research, it has now been placed in the vastly expanded family Plantaginaceae. Three species of Nuttallanthus are native to North America and one to South America. Nuttallanthus was until the 1980s included in a wider circumscription of the genus Linaria, a genus now considered restricted to the Old World.

== Taxonomy ==
The genus Nuttallanthus was scientifically described in 1988 by David A. Sutton. Its status is disputed with it listed as an accepted genus in World Plants and World Flora Online (WFO), but as a synonym of Linaria in Plants of the World Online.

It may contain four species:

- Nuttallanthus canadensis (L.) D.A.Sutton – Widespread from Canada to Mexico
- Nuttallanthus floridanus (Chapm.) D.A.Sutton – Alabama, Florida, Georgia, and Mississippi
- Nuttallanthus subandinus (Diels) D.A.Sutton – Colombia, Ecuador, and Peru
- Nuttallanthus texanus (Scheele) D.A.Sutton – Canada to Mexico and the Dominican Republic

According to WFO Nuttallanthus subandinus is a synonym of Nuttallanthus canadensis.

Closely related genera include the Linaria (Eurasian toadflaxes), Antirrhinum (snapdragons) and Cymbalaria (ivy-leaved toadflaxes).

The North American species do not appear to form interspecific hybrids at all. The most common mode of reproduction is self-fertilization, with occasional fertilization by another plant of the same species.

=== Names ===
The members of this genus are known in English as toadflax, a name shared with several other related genera. The scientific name honors Thomas Nuttall.
