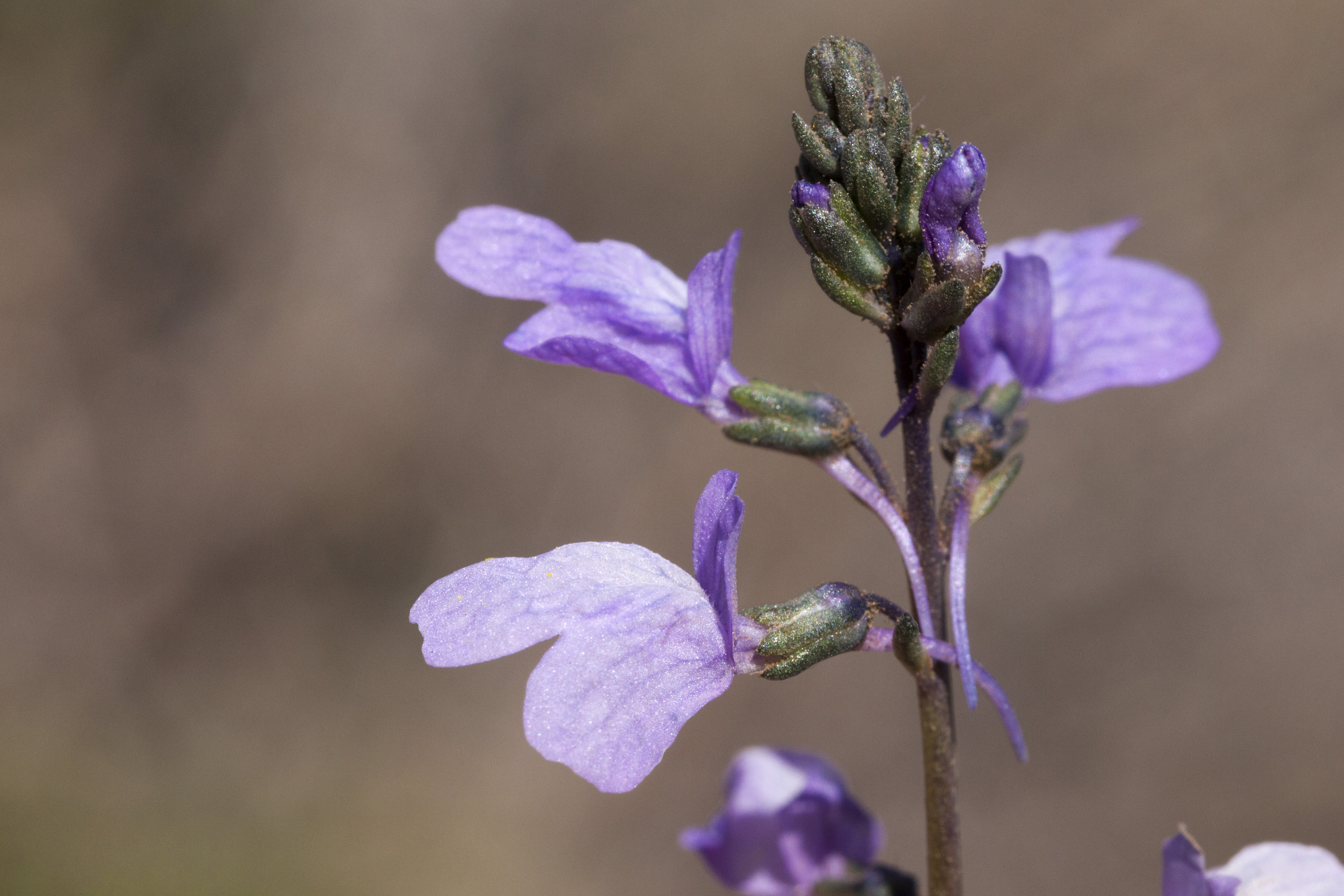

Conservation status
- Apparently Secure (NatureServe)

Scientific classification
- Kingdom: Plantae
- Clade: Embryophytes
- Clade: Tracheophytes
- Clade: Spermatophytes
- Clade: Angiosperms
- Clade: Eudicots
- Clade: Asterids
- Order: Lamiales
- Family: Plantaginaceae
- Genus: Nuttallanthus
- Species: N. texanus

Binomial name
- Nuttallanthus texanus (Scheele) D.A.Sutton

Synonyms
- Linaria canadensis var. texana; Linaria texana

= Nuttallanthus texanus =

Plant species in the veronica family

Nuttallanthus texanus, the Texas toadflax, is an annual to biennial plant in the veronica family found across much of the western United States. It can often be seen in patches along roadsides. Its inflorescence is raceme.

== Taxonomy ==
Nuttallanthus texanus was scientifically described in 1848 by George Heinrich Adolf Scheele who named it Linaria texana. The botanist Francis W. Pennell proposed reclassified it as a subspecies of Linaria canadensis in 1922, but together with three other species it was placed in the new genus Nuttallanthus by David A. Sutton in 1988. This is the accepted name according to World Plants, World Flora Online, The Jepson Manual, and the Database of Vascular Plants of Canada, however Plants of the World Online lists Linaria texana as the accepted name.

=== Names ===
The species name, texanus, is Botanical Latin meaning 'pertaining to Texas'. The common name Texas toadflax refers to it growing naturally in Texas and toadflax is for the resemblance of leaves to the narrow ones of true flax while the reference to toads is thought to come from mistaking the Latin bubonium in the description of a plant used in traditional medicine to treat groin swelling (buboes) for bufonis meaning toad. The species is also known as blue toadflax, but this name is also frequently used for Nuttallanthus canadensis.
