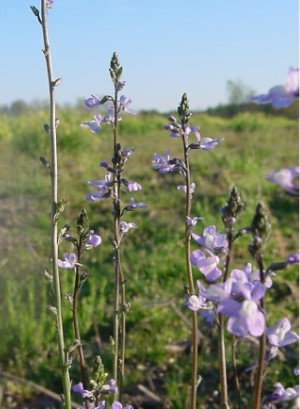

Conservation status
- Secure (NatureServe)

Scientific classification
- Kingdom: Plantae
- Clade: Tracheophytes
- Clade: Angiosperms
- Clade: Eudicots
- Clade: Asterids
- Order: Lamiales
- Family: Plantaginaceae
- Genus: Nuttallanthus
- Species: N. canadensis

Binomial name
- Nuttallanthus canadensis (L.) D.A.Sutton

Synonyms
- Antirrhinum canadense L.; Linaria canadensis (L.) Dumort.

= Nuttallanthus canadensis =

Species of flowering plant

Nuttallanthus canadensis, the blue toadflax, Canada toadflax, or old-field toadflax, is a species of Nuttallanthus in the family Plantaginaceae, native to eastern North America from Ontario east to Nova Scotia and south to Texas and Florida.

== Description ==
It is an annual or biennial plant growing to 25–80 cm (9.8–31.5 in) tall, with slender, erect flowering stems. The leaves are slender, 15–30 mm (0.59–1.18 in) long and 1–2.5 mm (0.04–0.10 in) broad. The flowers are purple to off-white, 10–15 mm (0.39–0.59 in) long, appearing from mid spring to late summer.

== Distribution and habitat ==
It is grown as an ornamental plant in its native area. It has been introduced to western North America and Europe, and is now locally naturalized, from Washington south to California, and also in Russia. It typically grows in bare areas and grassland.

== Ecology ==
The plant is a nectar source for bees and butterflies. It supports the larvae of the common buckeye. Leaves of the plant are also a food source for caterpillars.
