= Catalpol =

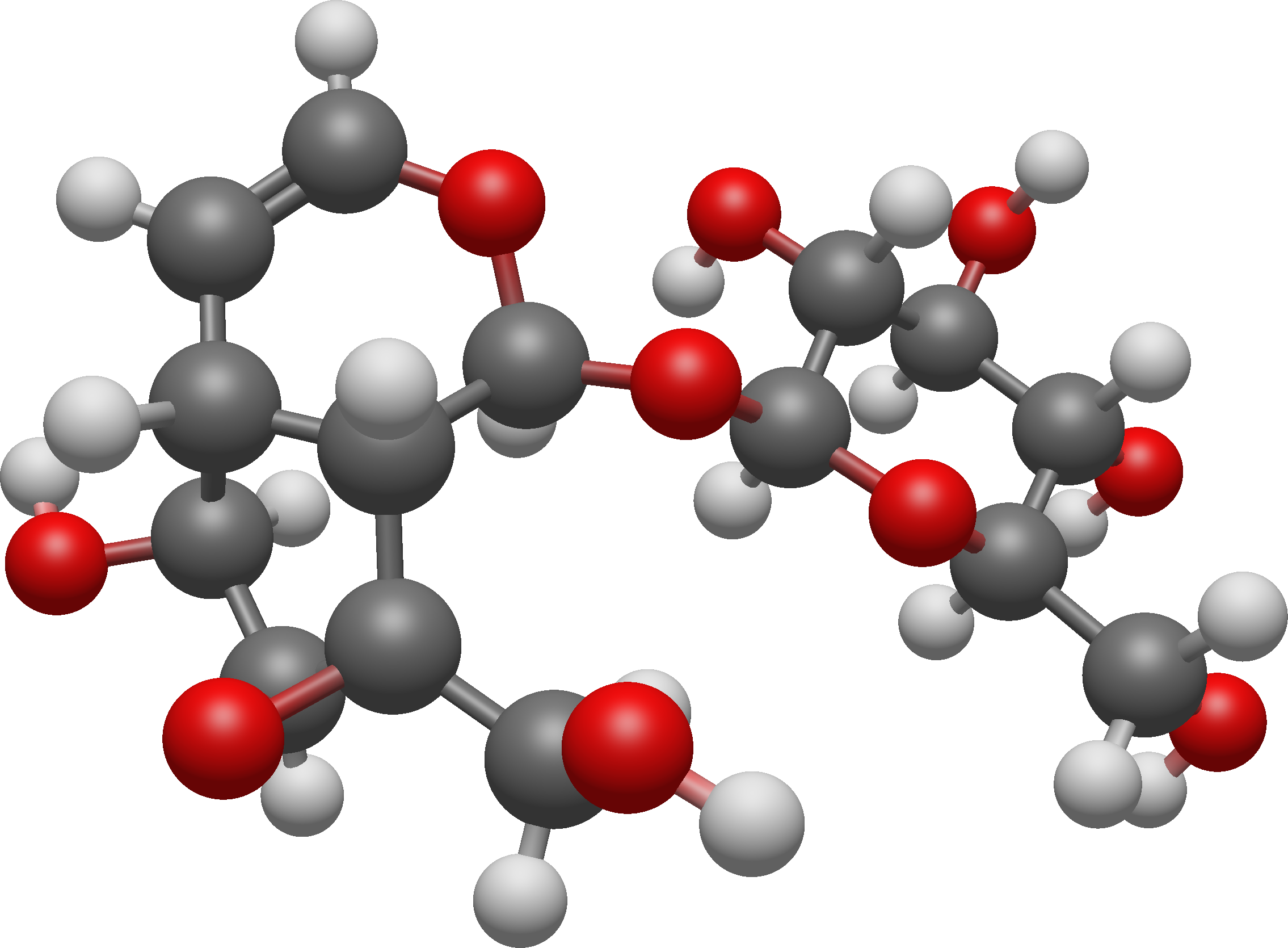

Names
- IUPAC name (1aS,1bS,2S,5aR,6S,6aS)-6-Hydroxy-1a-(hydroxymethyl)-1a,1b,2,5a,6,6a-hexahydrooxireno[2′,3′:4,5]cyclopenta[1,2-c]pyran-2-yl β-D-glucopyranoside
- Systematic IUPAC name (2S,3R,4S,5S,6R)-2-{[(1aS,1bS,2S,5aR,6S,6aS)-6-Hydroxy-1a-(hydroxymethyl)-1a,1b,2,5a,6,6a-hexahydrooxireno[2′,3′:4,5]cyclopenta[1,2-c]pyran-2-yl]oxy}-6-(hydroxymethyl)oxane-3,4,5-triol

Identifiers
CAS Number	2415-24-9
3D model (JSmol)	Interactive image
ChEBI	CHEBI:69797
ChEMBL	ChEMBL513223
ChemSpider	82641
ECHA InfoCard	100.017.568
EC Number	219-324-0
KEGG	C09773
PubChem CID	91520
UNII	JCX5L7JIC2
CompTox Dashboard (EPA)	DTXSID60178850
- InChI: InChI=1S/C15H22O10/c16-3-6-9(19)10(20)11(21)14(23-6)24-13-7-5(1-2-22-13)8(18)12-15(7,4-17)25-12/h1-2,5-14,16-21H,3-4H2/t5-,6-,7-,8+,9-,10+,11-,12+,13+,14+,15-/m1/s1 Key: LHDWRKICQLTVDL-PZYDOOQISA-N
- SMILES: O2\C=C/[C@H]4[C@H](O)[C@@H]1O[C@]1(CO)[C@H]4[C@@H]2O[C@@H]3O[C@@H]([C@@H](O)[C@H](O)[C@H]3O)CO

Properties
Chemical formula	C_{15}H_{22}O_{10}
Molar mass	362.331 g·mol^{−1}

Hazards
- GHS labelling
Pictograms	(GHS07: Exclamation mark)
Signal word	Warning
Hazard statements	H315, H319, H335
Precautionary statements	P261, P264, P264+P265, P271, P280, P302+P352, P304+P340, P305+P351+P338, P319, P321, P332+P317, P337+P317, P362+P364, P403+P233, P405, P501
- Except where otherwise noted, data are given for materials in their standard state (at 25 °C [77 °F], 100 kPa). Infobox references

Catalpol is an iridoid glucoside. This natural product falls in the class of iridoid glycosides, which are simply monoterpenes with a glucose molecule attached.

== Natural occurrence ==
First isolated in 1962, catalpol was named for plants in the genus Catalpa in which it was discovered. Later in 1969, catalpol was found to be present in larger quantities in several plants in genus Rehmannia (Orobanchaceae). It is also found in plants belonging to several families, including, but not limited to, Scrophulariaceae, Lamiaceae (including scullcap), Plantaginaceae (Plantago sp) and Bignoniaceae, all of which being in the order Lamiales.

Because they feed on these plants, variable checkerspot butterflies (Euphydryas chalcedona) contain high amounts of catalpol, which makes them unpalatable to predators and thus serves as a defense mechanism.

== Biosynthetic pathway ==
Though first isolated in the 1960s, there has been very little investigation of the biosynthetic pathway of catalpol. S. R. Jensen has described a possible biosynthetic pathway for catalpol. With iridoids stemming from a terpenoid origin, epi-iridotrial's precursor, epi-iridodial, is derived from geraniol. Addition of a glucose at carbon 1 (C1) of the iridoid backbone and oxidation of the aldehyde at C4 of epi-iridotrial produces 8-epiloganic acid. A subsequent hydrolysis at C8 yields mussaenosidic acid, followed by a dehydration to yield deoxyngeniposidic acid. The next precursor, geniposidic acid, is furnished via hydrolysis of C10, and then a decarboxylation to remove the carboxylic acid at C4 provides bartsioside. The very widely known and accepted precursor to catalpol, aucubin, is then furnished via hydroxylation at C6. Finally an epoxidation with the alcohol at C10 yields catalpol.

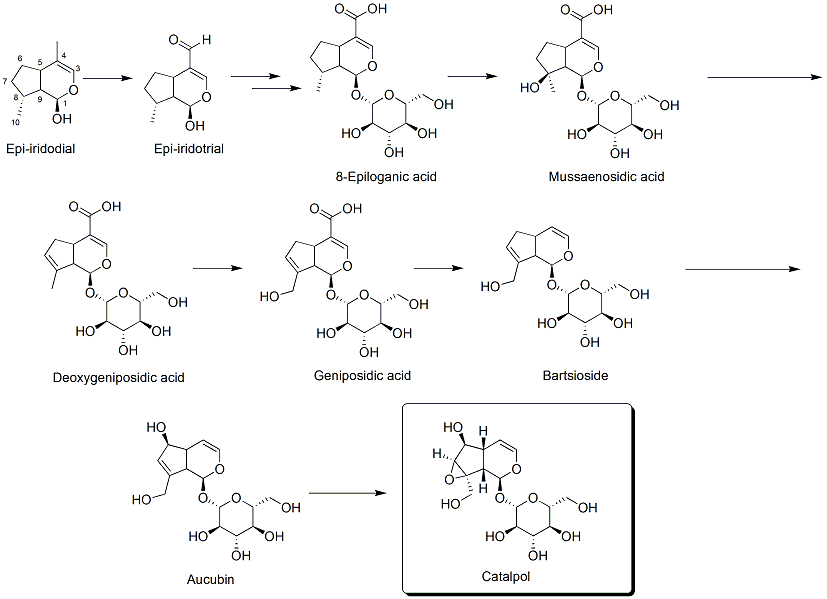
Biosynthesis of catalpol as proposed by Jensen
