= False foxglove =

False foxglove may refer to:

- Agalinis, a genus of plants in the family Orobanchaceae
- Aureolaria, another genus of plants in the family Orobanchaceae

== See also ==
- Foxglove (disambiguation)
