= Foxglove beardtongue =

Foxglove beardtongue or foxglove penstemon is a common name for several plants and may refer to:

- Penstemon cobaea, native to the south-central and southwestern United States, with pink to white flowers
- Penstemon digitalis, native to most of eastern North America, with white flowers
