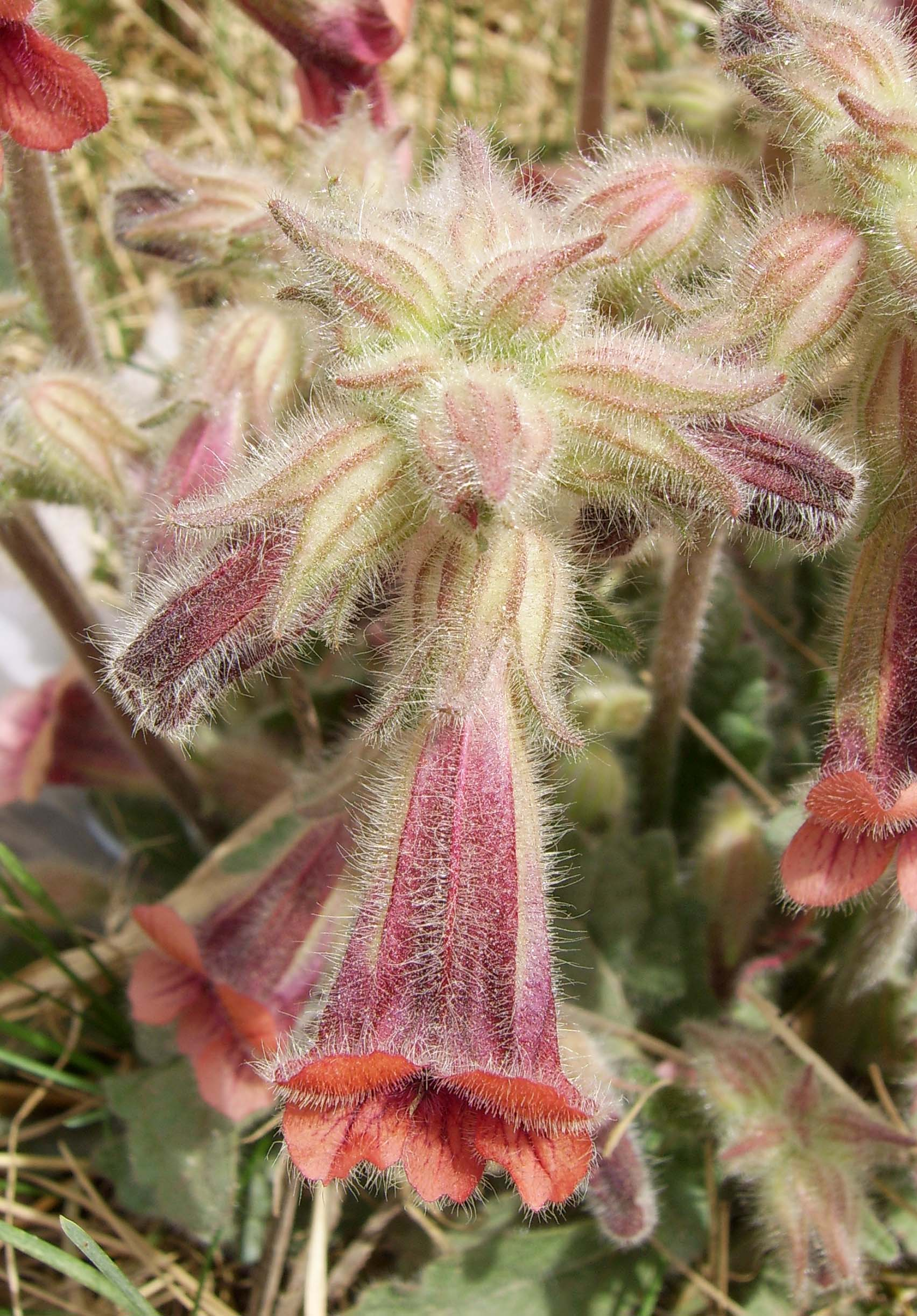
- Flowers of Rehmannia glutinosa

Scientific classification
- Kingdom: Plantae
- Clade: Embryophytes
- Clade: Tracheophytes
- Clade: Spermatophytes
- Clade: Angiosperms
- Clade: Eudicots
- Clade: Asterids
- Order: Lamiales
- Family: Orobanchaceae
- Tribe: Rehmannieae; Rouy
- Genus: Rehmannia; Libosch. ex Fisch. & C.A. Mey.

Species
- See text.

= Rehmannia =

Genus of flowering plants in the broomrape family

Rehmannia is a genus of seven species of flowering plants in the order Lamiales and family Orobanchaceae, which is native to China and Japan. It has been placed as the only member of the monotypic tribe Rehmannieae, but molecular phylogenetic studies suggest that it forms a clade with Triaenophora. Contrary to the vast majority of the taxa of Orobanchaceae, Rehmannia is not parasitic.

== Systematics ==
=== Etymology ===
Rehmannia is named for Joseph Rehmann (1788–1831), a physician who worked in St. Petersburg.

==== Homonymy ====
The name "Rehmannia" has also been given to a genus of Jurassic ammonites of the family Reineckeidae.

=== Classification ===
The genus was included in the family Scrophulariaceae or Gesneriaceae in some older classifications. The current placement of the genus is in neither Scrophulariaceae s.s. nor Plantaginaceae s.l. (to which many other former Scrophulariaceae have been transferred). Earlier molecular studies suggested that its closest relatives were the genera Lancea and Mazus, which have been included in Phrymaceae. Subsequently, it was found that Rehmannia groups with Triaenophora, and both taxa are jointly the sister group to Lindenbergia and the parasitic Orobanchaceae. A 2016 classification of flowering plants, the APG IV system enlarged Orobanchaceae to include Rehmannia, making it one of the few genera in the family, along with Lindenbergia, not to be parasitic.

=== Species list ===
As of February 2025, Plants of the World Online accepted seven species:

Image	Scientific name	Distribution
	Rehmannia chingii H.L.Li	China
	Rehmannia chrysantha M.H.Li & C.H.Zhang	Inner Mongolia
	Rehmannia glutinosa (Gaertn.) DC.	China
	Rehmannia henryi N.E.Br.	China (Hubei)
	Rehmannia japonica (Thunb.) Makino	Japan (C. Honshu)
	Rehmannia piasezkii Maxim.	China (Hubei, Shanxi)
	Rehmannia solanifolia P.C.Tsoong & T.L.Chin	China (Sichuan)

== Uses ==
Sometimes known as Chinese foxglove due to its superficial resemblance to the genus Digitalis, the species of Rehmannia are perennial herbs. The plants have large flowers and are grown as ornamental garden plants in Europe and North America, and are used medicinally in Asia.

=== Traditional Chinese medicine ===
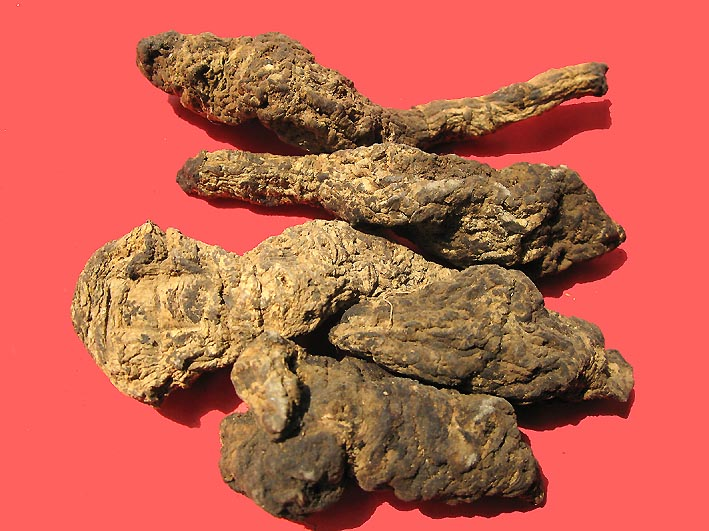
Dried Rehmannia roots

Known as dìhuáng (地黄) or gān dìhuáng (干地黄) in Chinese, R. glutinosa is used as a medicinal herb for many conditions within Chinese traditional formulations.

It is the main ingredient in a mixture called si wu tang (four substance decoction) along with Dang gui, Chinese peony (bai shao yao), and Ligusticum striatum (chuan xiong) that is considered a fundamental medicine to support making blood.

When two ingredients, peach (tao ren) and safflower (hong hua), are added, it is called tao hong si wu tang (four substance decoction with peach pit and safflower), which is used in traditional chinese medicine for fatigue.

== Chemical constituents ==
Rehmannia contains the vitamins A, B, C, and D, as well as other compounds, such as catalpol, an iridoid glycoside.
