= List of flora of the Santa Monica Mountains =

The Santa Monica Mountains, one of the Transverse Ranges located in Southern California, are in the California chaparral and woodlands ecoregion of the California Floristic Province. This ecoregion has two predominant ecosystems, with three primary plant communities:

- the California coastal sage and chaparral, with coastal sage scrub along the coast,
- the California montane chaparral and woodlands, with chaparral and California oak woodlands as the mountains rise and recede from the coast and descend into the interior valleys.

== Introduction ==
The Santa Monica Mountains are covered by hundreds of local plant species: some are endemic or very rare, some are beautiful California native plants in situ, and some also are familiar as horticultural ornamental and native garden plants. Each season has different plants predominating the visual experience.

A partial list of Plants seen in the Santa Monica Mountains:

== Native and non-native flora ==
=== Monocotyledons ===
- Asparagaceae

Hesperoyucca whipplei (syn. Yucca whipplei) (chaparral yucca, our lord's candle, Spanish bayonet)

- Amaryllidaceae

Allium peninsulare
Bloomeria crocea
Dipterostemon capitatus (blue dicks)

- Cyperaceae

Carex senta
Carex spp.

- Iridaceae

Sisyrinchium bellum (blue-eyed grass)

- Juncaceae

Juncus patens (gray spike rush)
Juncus spp.

- Liliaceae

Calochortus splendens (calochortus)
Calochortus venustus
Calochortus spp.
Chlorogalum pomeridianum (soap plant)
Fritillaria biflora
Lilium humboldtii (Humboldt's lily)

- Orchidaceae

Epipactis gigantea (stream orchid)

- Poaceae (alt. Gramineae)

Festuca californica (California fescue)
Leymus condensatus (syn. Eleymus condensatus) (giant wild rye grass)
Leymus triticoides (creeping wild rye)
Melica californica (California melic grass)
Melica imperfecta (little california melic grass)
Nassella pulchra (syn. Stipa pulchra) (purple needlegrass)

=== Dicotyledons ===
- Aizoaceae

(Ice Plant)
Carpobrotus edulis
Mesembryanthemum crystallinum

- Anacardiaceae (Sumac)

Malosma laurina (Laurel Sumac)
Rhus integrifolia (Lemonadeberry)
Rhus ovata (Sugar Bush)
Rhus trilobata (Squaw Bush)
Toxicodendron diversilobum (Poison Oak) (skin irritation)

- Apiaceae (Umbel flowers, Carrots)

Conium maculatum (Poison Hemlock) (poisonous)
Foeniculum vulgare (Sweet Fennel)

- Asteraceae

(Yarrow)
Artemisia californica (California sagebrush)
Baccharis glutinosa (Mule fat)
Baccharis pilularis (Coyote Brush)
Centaurea melitensis (Yellow Star Thistle) (significant invasive exotic)
Cirsium occidentale
Encelia californica
Eriophyllum confertiflorum
Gnaphalium californicum
Malacothrix saxatilis (Cliff Aster)
Silybum marianum
Misc (sunfowers)

- Boraginaceae
- Brassicaceae

Brassica nigra (Black Mustard) (invasive exotic)
Stanleya pinnata

- Cactaceae

Opuntia littoralis

- Capparaceae

Isomeris arborea
Sambucus mexicana (Mexican Elderberry)

- Caryophyllaceae

Silene laciniata

- Chenopodiaceae

Salsola iberica (Tumbleweed)

- Cistaceae

Cistus villosus
Helianthemum scoparium

- Convolvulaceae

Calystegia macrostegia (Morning glory)
Cuscuta californica (Dodder, Orangebeard, Witches Hair)

- Crassulaceae

Dudleya lanceolata
Dudleya pulverulenta (Chalk Dudleya)

- Cucurbitaceae

Cucurbita foetidissima
Marah macrocarpus

- Ericaceae (Heath family)

Arctostaphylos glandulosa

- Euphorbiaceae

Euphorbia albomarginata
Ricinus communis

- Fabaceae (Leguminosae, Pea family)

Lotus scoparius (Broom)
Lupinus spp.
Lupinus hirsutissimus
Medicago sativa
Pickeringia montana
Spartium junceum

- Gentianaceae

Centaurium venustum

- Geraniaceae

Erodium cicutarium

- Hydrophyllaceae

Eriodictyon crassifolium (Yerba Santa)
Phacelia cicutaria (Caterpillar phacelia)
Phacelia grandiflora
Phacelia parryi

- Lamiaceae (Mint)

Marrubium vulgare (Horehound)
Salvia apiana (White Sage)
Salvia clevelandii - (Cleveland sage)
Salvia columbariae (Chia)
Salvia leucophylla (Purple sage)
Salvia mellifera (Black sage)

- Malvaceae

Malacothamnus fasciculatus
Malva parviflora (Cheeseweed)

- Nyctaginaceae

Abronia umbellata (Verbena)
Mirabilis californica (Wishbone Plant)

- Onagraceae

Clarkia deflexa
Clarkia unguiculata
Zauschneria californica - (California Fuchsia)

- Oxalidaceae

Oxalis pes-caprae

- Paeoniaceae

Paeonia californica

- Papaveraceae

Dendromecon rigida - (Bush Poppy)
Dicentra ochroleuca
Eschscholzia californica - (California Poppy)
Papaver californicum
Romneya coulteri - (Matilija Poppy)

- Polemonacea

Leptodactylon californicum
Linanthus dianthiflorus

- Polygonaceae

Eriogonum crocatum - (Conejo Buckwheat) (endemic)
Eriogonum cinereum - (Coastal Buckwheat) (endemic)
Eriogonum elongatum
Eriogonum fasciculatum - (California buckwheat)
Rumex crispus

- Portulacaceae

Claytonia perfoliata
Primulaceae
Anagalis arvensis
Dodecatheon clevelandii

- Ranunculaceae

Clematis ligusticifolia
Delphinium cardinale:
Delphinium parryi
Ranunculus californicus

- Rhamnaceae

Ceanothus crassifolius
Ceanothus cuneatus
Ceanothus leucodermis
Ceanothus megacarpus - (Bigpod Ceanothus) (endemic)
Ceanothus oliganthus
Ceanothus spinosus
Rhamnus californica - (Coffeeberry)

- Rosaceae

Adenostoma fasciculatum - (Coastal Sage)
Cercocarpus betuloides - (Mountain Mahogany)
Heteromeles arbutifolia - (Toyon)
Prunus ilicifolia - (Evergreen Cherry)
Rosa californica
Rubus ursinus - (California Blackberry)

- Salicaceae

Salix lasiolepis - (Arroyo Willow)

- Saxifragaceae

Ribes amarum - (Bitter Gooseberry) (endemic)
Ribes aureum - (Golden Currant)
Ribes divaricatum - (Parish's Gooseberry)
Ribes malvaceum - (Chaparral Currant)
Ribes speciosum - (Fuchsia-flowered Gooseberry)

- Scrophulariaceae (Figwort family)

Anirrhinum coulterianum
Antirrhinim kelloggii
Castilleja affins
Casrilleja foliolosa
Castilleja marinii
Mimulus brevipes
Mimulus aurantiacus
Mimulus cardinalis
Mimulus guttatus
Mimulus longiflorus
Mimulus pilosus
Orthocarpus purpurascens
Pedicularis densiflora
Penstemon centranthifolius
Penstemon heterophyllus
Penstemon spectabilis

- Solanaceae

Datura innoxia (Datura)
Nicotiana glauca
Nicotiana bigelovii
Nicotiana glauca
Solanum douglasii
Solanum xanti

- Trees

Acer macrophyllum - (Bigleaf Maple)
Alnus rhombifolia - (White Alder)
Juglans californica - (California Black Walnut)
Quercus agrifolia - (Coast Live Oak)
Quercus chrysolepis - (Canyon Live Oak)
Pinus sabiniana - (Digger Pine, Gray Pine)
Platanus racemosa - (California Sycamore)
Umbellularia Californica - (California Bay)

== See also ==
- Natural history of the Santa Monica Mountains

- Santa Monica Mountains National Recreation Area

- California chaparral and woodlands

- California coastal sage and chaparral sub-ecoregion
- Coastal sage scrub plant community
- California montane chaparral and woodlands sub-ecoregion

- California Native Plant Society
