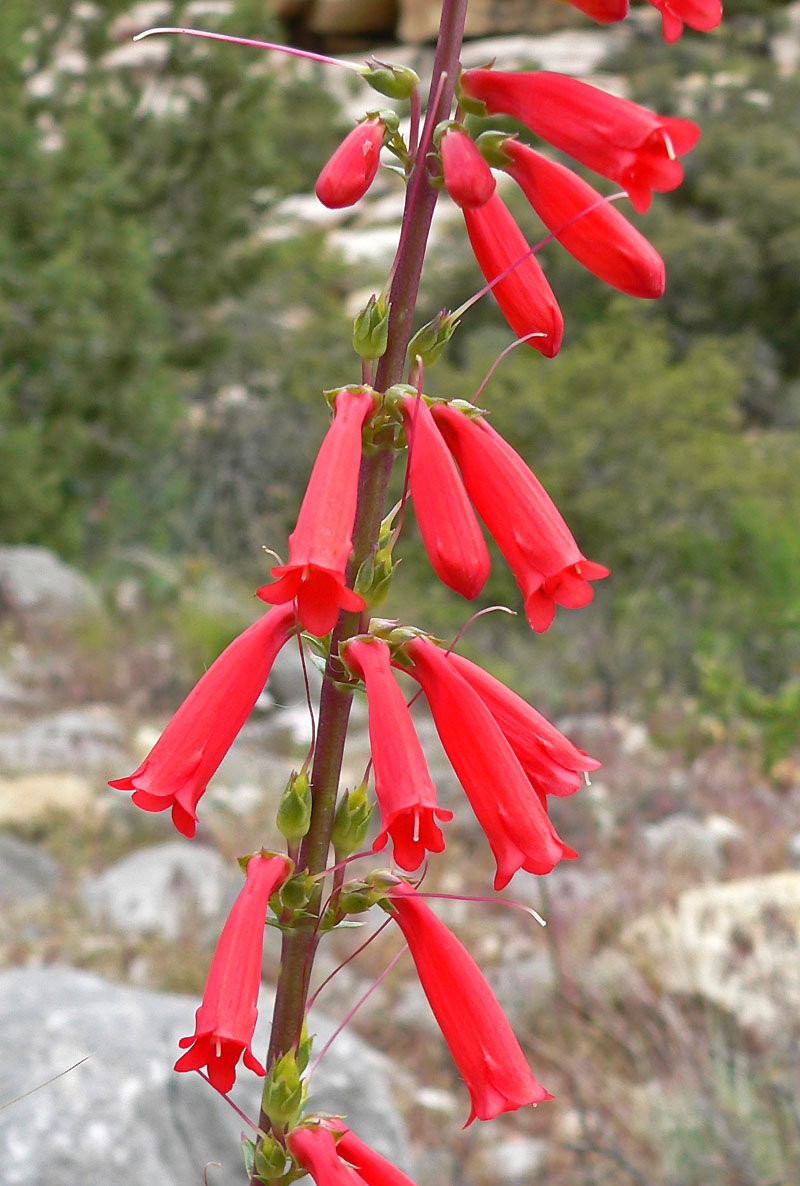

Conservation status
- Secure (NatureServe)

Scientific classification
- Kingdom: Plantae
- Clade: Tracheophytes
- Clade: Angiosperms
- Clade: Eudicots
- Clade: Asterids
- Order: Lamiales
- Family: Plantaginaceae
- Genus: Penstemon
- Species: P. eatonii

Binomial name
- Penstemon eatonii A.Gray

Varieties
- P. eatonii var. eatonii; P. eatonii var. exsertus (A.Nelson) C.C.Freeman; P. eatonii var. undosus M.E.Jones

Synonyms
- See list in Taxonomy

= Penstemon eatonii =

Plant species in the plantain family

Penstemon eatonii is a species of flowering plant in the genus Penstemon, known by the common name firecracker penstemon. It is native to the Western United States from Southern California to the Rocky Mountains. It grows in many types of desert, woodland, forest, and open plateau habitat.

== Description ==
Penstemon eatonii is a herbaceous plant with a few to several medium height stems that are between 30 and 100 centimeters (1.0 and 3.3 ft) when full grown. The stems can grow straight upright or might grow out and then curve to growing upwards. Their texture might be hairless or covered in backwards facing stiff hairs, but is never waxy or glaucous. It is relatively short lived perennial.

Firecracker penstemon has both cauline and basal leaves, those that are attached to the stems and ones that grow directly from the base of the plant, which are very deep green and glossy. The basal leaves and lowest ones on the stems are normally 5 to 10 centimeters (2 to 4 in) in length, but on occasion may be as long as 20 cm (8 in). Their width ranges from 1.5 to 5 cm (0.6 to 2.0 in), but usually do not exceed 2.8 cm (1.1 in). The lower leaves are wider than ones further up the plant and are attached by petioles. On the stems there are three to five pairs of leaves attached on opposite sides. The lower leaves are obovate to elliptic, teardrop shaped to having ellipse shaped sides with smooth edges. Upper leaves are ovate or lanceolate, egg shaped to spear head shaped, and attach directly to the stem, sometimes with the base clasping and the shoulders of the leaf extended to be heart shaped.

The inflorescence is the upper 9 to 45 cm (3.5 to 17.5 in) of the stem. Each inflorescence has four to twelve groups of flowers with a pair of opposite bracts underneath where they attach. Each group has two cymes, branched parts of the inflorescence usually with one or two flowers, but occasionally as many as four. The bright color of the flowers contrasts strikingly with the darker color of the foliage making this a very striking wildflower. The brilliant color of the bloom is variously described as cardinal red, scarlet, or orange-red. The length of the fused petals ranges from 24 to 33 millimeters (0.9 to 1.3 in). They are nearly radially symmetrical, only weakly divided into two lips, with the lobes not spreading very much.

== Taxonomy ==
In 1871 Sereno Watson described a species that he named Penstemon centranthifolius, however George Bentham had already used his name for another species in 1835, so this was an illegitimate name. The next year Asa Gray published his description of the species naming it Penstemon eatonii. It has three varieties:

- Penstemon eatonii var. eatonii
- Penstemon eatonii var. exsertus (A.Nelson) C.C.Freeman
- Penstemon eatonii var. undosus M.E.Jones

It also has 7 synonyms of one of its three varieties.

Table of Synonyms
Name	Year	Rank	Synonym of:	Notes
Penstemon amplus A.Nelson	1938	species	var. eatonii	= het.
Penstemon centranthifolius S.Watson	1871	species	var. eatonii	= het. nom. illeg.
Penstemon coccinatus Rydb.	1909	species	var. undosus	= het.
Penstemon eatonii subsp. exsertus (A.Nelson) D.D.Keck	1939	subspecies	var. exsertus	≡ hom.
Penstemon eatonii subsp. undosus (M.E.Jones) D.D.Keck	1939	subspecies	var. undosus	≡ hom.
Penstemon exsertus A.Nelson	1931	species	var. exsertus	≡ hom.
Penstemon munzii I.M.Johnst.	1922	species	var. undosus	= het.
Notes: ≡ homotypic synonym; = heterotypic synonym

=== Names ===
The species name was selected to honor Daniel Cady Eaton, a botanist who worked at Yale University. In English it is most commonly called the firecracker penstemon. Eaton made botanical collections in Utah during the late 1800s. Related to its scientific name it is also known as Eaton's penstemon, Eaton penstemon, and Eaton's firecracker. It is occasionally called scarlet bugler, though Penstemon centranthifolius is also known by this name.

== Range and habitat ==
Penstemon eatonii is native to the southwestern United States, largely in southern Great Basin and the Colorado River Basin. At its eastern edges it grows in the most western counties of Colorado from Mesa County south to Four Corners. It is only found occasionally in the farthest northwest corner of New Mexico. In Utah it is found from the Wasatch Mountains southward. Its range extends through almost all of Arizona, but only in the southern part of Nevada with an isolated population in the north in Humboldt County. In the far west it reaches California grows in the Mojave Desert and the Sonoran Desert and reaches the San Bernardino Mountains. It also is reported in Wyoming and Idaho, but without specific locations.

It grows in a wide variety of habitats including sagebrush steppes, pinyon–juniper woodlands, mountain mahogany scrublands, and Ponderosa pine forests. It does not display a strong preference for slopes compared with flat areas.

=== Conservation ===
The conservation non-profit NatureServe evaluated Penstemon eatonii in 1990 and at that time rated it as secure (G5).

== Ecology ==
Unlike penstemons that are adapted to pollination by bees, the firecracker penstemon has a much longer and narrow floral tube and lacks the wide lobes at the flower's mouth for insects to use as landing platform. Instead it is visited by hummingbirds.

The caterpillars of the anicia checkerspot (Euphydryas anicia morandi) feed on firecracker penstemons.

== Uses ==
A person from the Shoshone in Nevada interviewed by Beatty Train in the 1930s reported that red flowered penstemons, such as Penstemon eatoni, could be used to aid in healing burns. The whole plant would be boiled and then used as a wash to aid skin healing and reduce pain.

== See also ==
- List of Penstemon species
