= Chionodes dammersi =

Scientific classification
- Kingdom: Animalia
- Phylum: Arthropoda
- Clade: Pancrustacea
- Class: Insecta
- Order: Lepidoptera
- Family: Gelechiidae
- Genus: Chionodes
- Species: C. dammersi

Binomial name
- Chionodes dammersi (Keifer, 1936)

Synonyms
- Gelechia dammersi Keifer, 1936

Species of moth

Chionodes dammersi is a moth in the family Gelechiidae. It is found in North America, where it has been recorded from California and Arizona.

The larvae feed on Eriogonum elongatum, Eriogonum inflatum, Eriogonum abrorescens, Eriogonum fasciculatum, Eriogonum grande, Eriogonum latifolium and Eriogonum parvifolium.
