= Ethmia coquillettella =

Scientific classification
- Domain: Eukaryota
- Kingdom: Animalia
- Phylum: Arthropoda
- Class: Insecta
- Order: Lepidoptera
- Family: Depressariidae
- Genus: Ethmia
- Species: E. coquillettella

Binomial name
- Ethmia coquillettella Busck, 1907

Species of moth

Ethmia coquillettella is a moth in the family Depressariidae. It is found in North America along the southern and inner central coast range of California and has also been recorded from interior British Columbia.

The length of the forewings is 6.5–8.4 mm (0.26–0.33 in). The ground color of the forewings (including the fringe) is mouse gray or blackish gray, sparsely to heavily dusted with whitish. There are two pale yellow to yellowish orange marks and some black marks. The ground color of the hindwings is white with a broad black border. Adults are on wing from February to April (in California) and from April to May (in British Columbia).

The larvae feed on Phacelia species, possibly Phacelia distans and Phacelia cicutaria.
