= Showy beardtongue =

Showy beardtongue or showy penstemon is a common name for several plants and may refer to:

- Penstemon cobaea, native to the south central United States, with pink to purple flowers
- Penstemon speciosus, native to the western United States, with blue flowers
- Penstemon spectabilis, native to California and Baja California, with purple flowers
