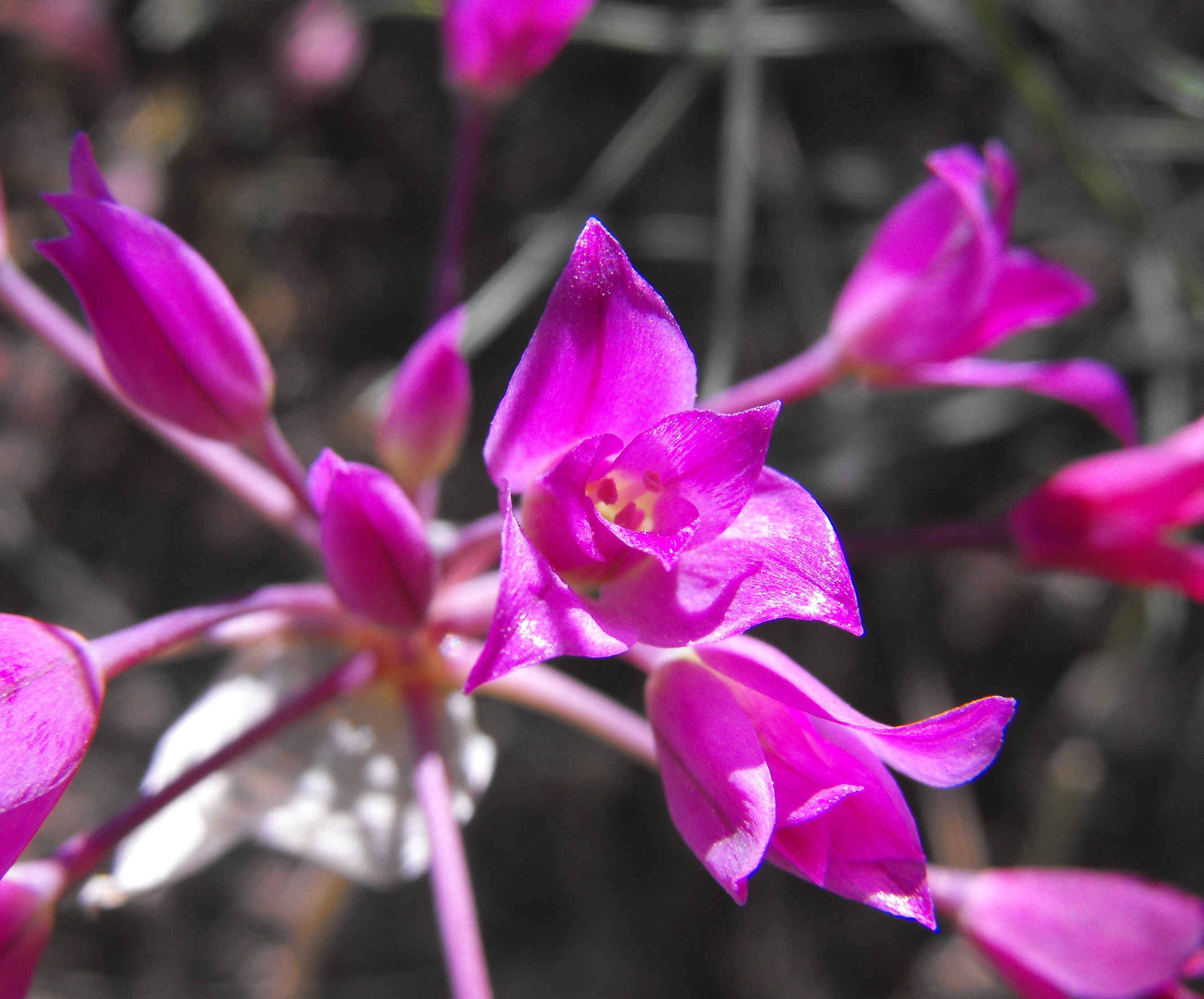

Scientific classification
- Kingdom: Plantae
- Clade: Tracheophytes
- Clade: Angiosperms
- Clade: Monocots
- Order: Asparagales
- Family: Amaryllidaceae
- Subfamily: Allioideae
- Genus: Allium
- Species: A. peninsulare

Binomial name
- Allium peninsulare Lemmon ex Greene

= Allium peninsulare =

Species of flowering plant

Allium peninsulare is a North American species of wild onion. It is known by such common names as Mexicali onion and Peninsula onion; the former referring to the Mexican city just south of the US/Mexican border, the latter referring to the Peninsula of Baja California.

== Description ==
The plant produces a bulb which grows about 13 millimetres (0.5 in) long by 8–15 mm (0.3–0.6 in) wide; it is ovoid to globose in shape. The brown to gray outer coats enclose one or more bulbs, they are prominently cellular-reticulate and membranous; the cells are arranged in vertical rows forming a distinct herringbone pattern, transversely elongate, V-shaped and without fibers. The white inner coats have cells that are either not visible or arranged in vertical rows like the outer coats, forming a herringbone pattern, and are more or less transversely elongate.

From the bulb, a smooth stalk arises. The 2-3 leaves are persistent, withering from tip by anthesis, basally sheathing, with sheaths not extending much above the soil surface; leaf blades are solid, subterete or somewhat channeled, straight to arcuate, growing 8 cm–30 cm × 1 cm–3 cm (3 in–10 in × 0.4 in–1 in), with entire margins.

Between May and July, it sends up a 12–45 cm (5–20 in) scape, growing solitary, erect, solid, terete, and measuring 12–45 cm (5–20 in) tall by 1–3 mm (0.04–0.1 in) wide. The inflorescence is an umbel, growing persistent, erect, loose, containing 5–35 flowers in a hemispheric to conic form. The two spathe bracts that enclose the umbel are persistent, 3–6-veined, lance-ovate to ovate, more or less equal, with an acuminate apex. Pedicels grow 8–40 mm (0.3–2 in) tall. The flowers themselves are campanulate growing to 8–15 mm (0.3–0.6 in), with six reddish or rose-purple tepals which grow erect, lanceolate to elliptic, and are unequal. The outer tepals are longer and wider than the inner ones, becoming rigid and somewhat carinate (keel-shaped) in fruit. Margins never crisped, are entire in outer tepals and minutely denticulate in the inner tepals. Apices are acute or short-acuminate. Inner tepals spread at the tip, where outer tepals are more or less recurved. The flowers contain included stamens, the anthers and pollen are yellow. Ovaries are crested with 3 processes which are central, 2-lobed, minute, and with entire margins. Styles are linear, equaling the stamens. The stigma is capitate, unlobed to distinctly 3-lobed.

The seeds have dull coats with minutely roughened cells.

== Taxonomy ==
Varieties

- A. peninsulare var. franciscanum McNeal & Ownbey --- leaves arched; flowers 8–12 mm (0.3–0.5 in), stigma scarcely thickened, unlobed or obscurely 3-lobed — central California from Mendocino County to Monterey County; flowers May-June; grows on clay soil on dry hillsides at elevations of 50–300 m (200–1,000 ft)
- A. peninsulare var. peninsulare — leaves straight; flowers 10–15 mm (0.4–0.6 in), stigma capitate and strongly 3-lobed — widespread from Baja California to Oregon; flowers April-May; grows on clay and serpentine soil at elevations of 300–1,100 m (1,000–4,000 ft)

formerly included

Allium peninsulare var. crispum (Greene) Jeps., now called Allium crispum Greene

=== Etymology ===
The genus name Allium is Latin for garlic, the specific epithet peninsularis is Latin for "of the peninsula," referring to the Baja California peninsula where the species was first collected.

== Distribution and habitat ==
It is widespread in California, USA, where it grows in the California Coast Ranges, Sierra Nevada foothills, some of the Channel Islands, and Peninsular Ranges. The range extends south into the northernmost part of Baja California and north into southern Oregon.

Allium peninsulare is usually found in valley grassland, foothill woodland, and coastal chaparral, at elevations up to 1100 m (3660 feet).

== Ecology ==
A. peninsulare is a perennial herb, blooming from April to July. It grows on dry and rocky slopes and flatter grasslands and oak woodlands. The plants prefer full sun and require moderate water. It supports species of butterflies in their habitats.

== Use ==
The plant is edible, having the taste and smell of onions.

== See also ==
- California montane chaparral and woodlands
