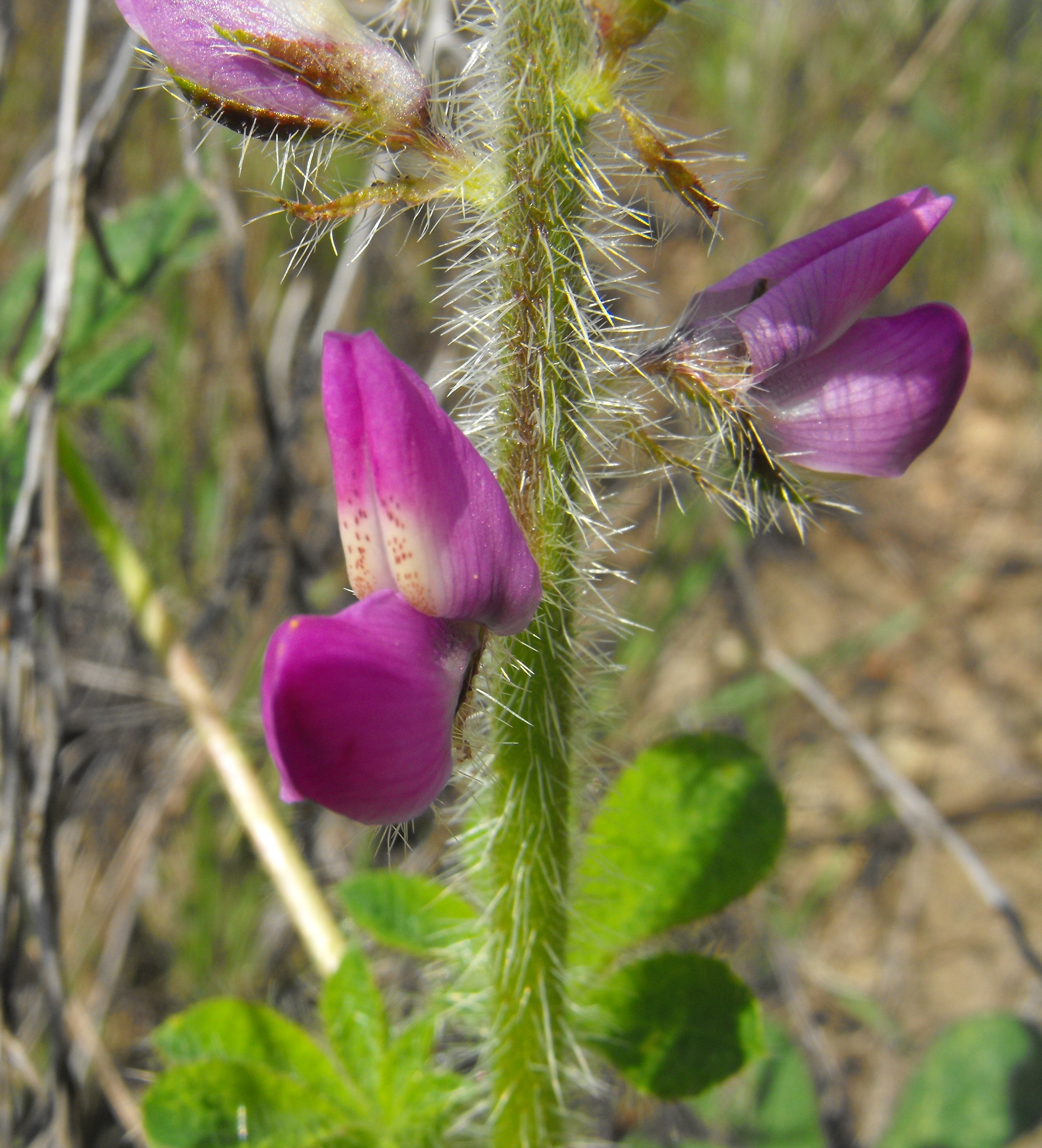

Scientific classification
- Kingdom: Plantae
- Clade: Tracheophytes
- Clade: Angiosperms
- Clade: Eudicots
- Clade: Rosids
- Order: Fabales
- Family: Fabaceae
- Subfamily: Faboideae
- Genus: Lupinus
- Species: L. hirsutissimus

Binomial name
- Lupinus hirsutissimus Benth.

= Lupinus hirsutissimus =

Species of legume

Lupinus hirsutissimus is a species of lupine known by the common names stinging annual lupine or stinging lupine. It is native to the coastal mountains of Baja California and Southern California as far north as the San Francisco Bay Area. It grows on dry mountain slopes, including areas that have recently burned, and chaparral and woodlands habitats.

== Description ==
Lupinus hirsutissimus is an erect annual herb growing 20 centimetres (7.9 in) to one meter tall; it may exceed one meter in habitat recovering from wildfire. The stem and herbage are coated in long, stiff hairs that sting skin when touched. Each palmate leaf is made up of 5 to 8 leaflets up to 5 centimetres (2.0 in) long and 1 or 2 wide. The inflorescence bears several flowers generally not arranged in whorls. Each flower is between 1 and 2 centimeters long and dark pink in color with a yellowish to pinkish spot on its banner. The fruit is a hairy legume pod up to 4 centimetres (1.6 in) long.

== See also ==
- California chaparral and woodlands
- California coastal sage and chaparral ecoregion
- California montane chaparral and woodlands
