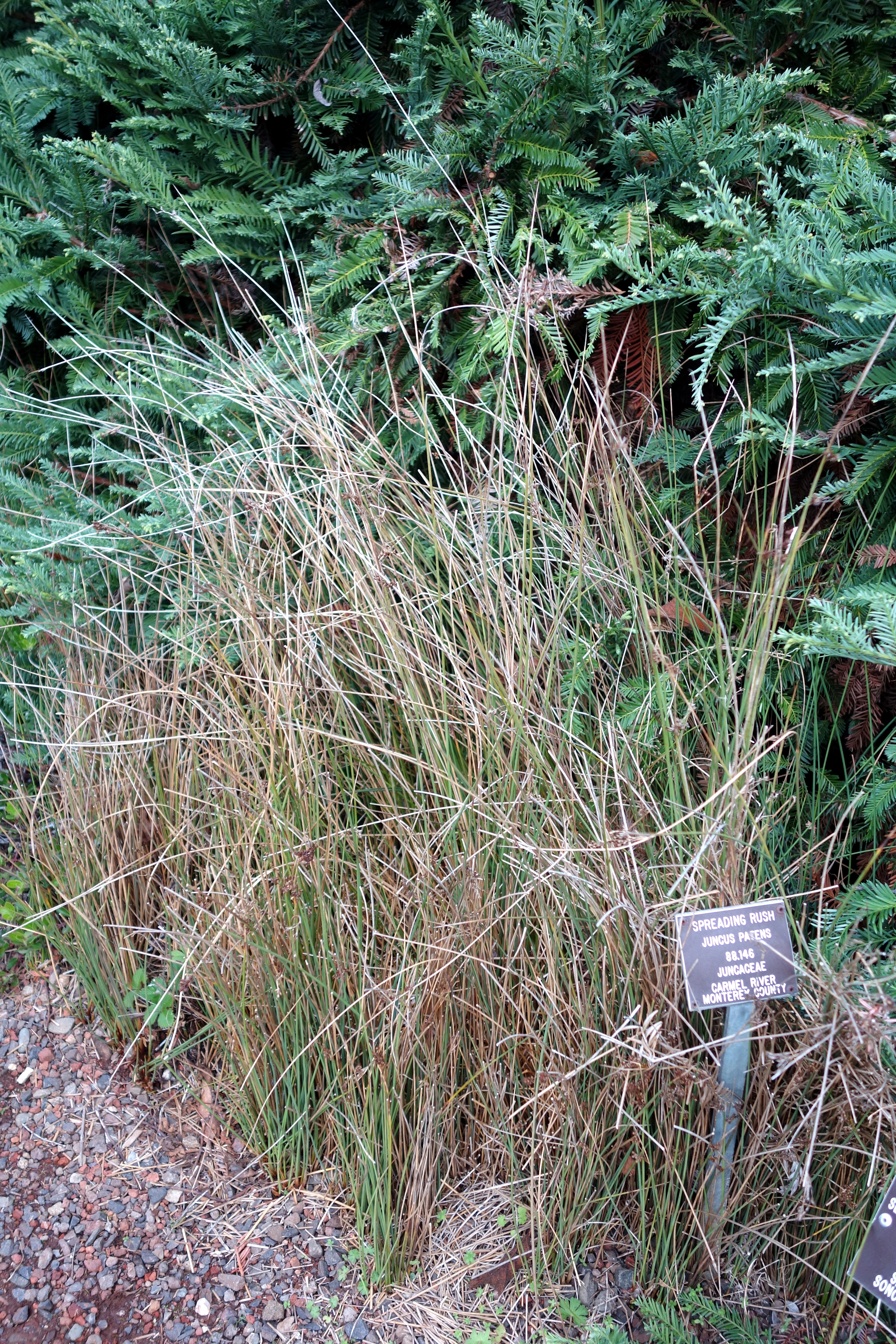

Scientific classification
- Kingdom: Plantae
- Clade: Embryophytes
- Clade: Tracheophytes
- Clade: Spermatophytes
- Clade: Angiosperms
- Clade: Monocots
- Clade: Commelinids
- Order: Poales
- Family: Juncaceae
- Genus: Juncus
- Species: J. patens

Binomial name
- Juncus patens E.Mey.

Synonyms
- Agathryon patens (E.Mey.) Záv.Drábk. & Proćków

= Juncus patens =

Species of rush

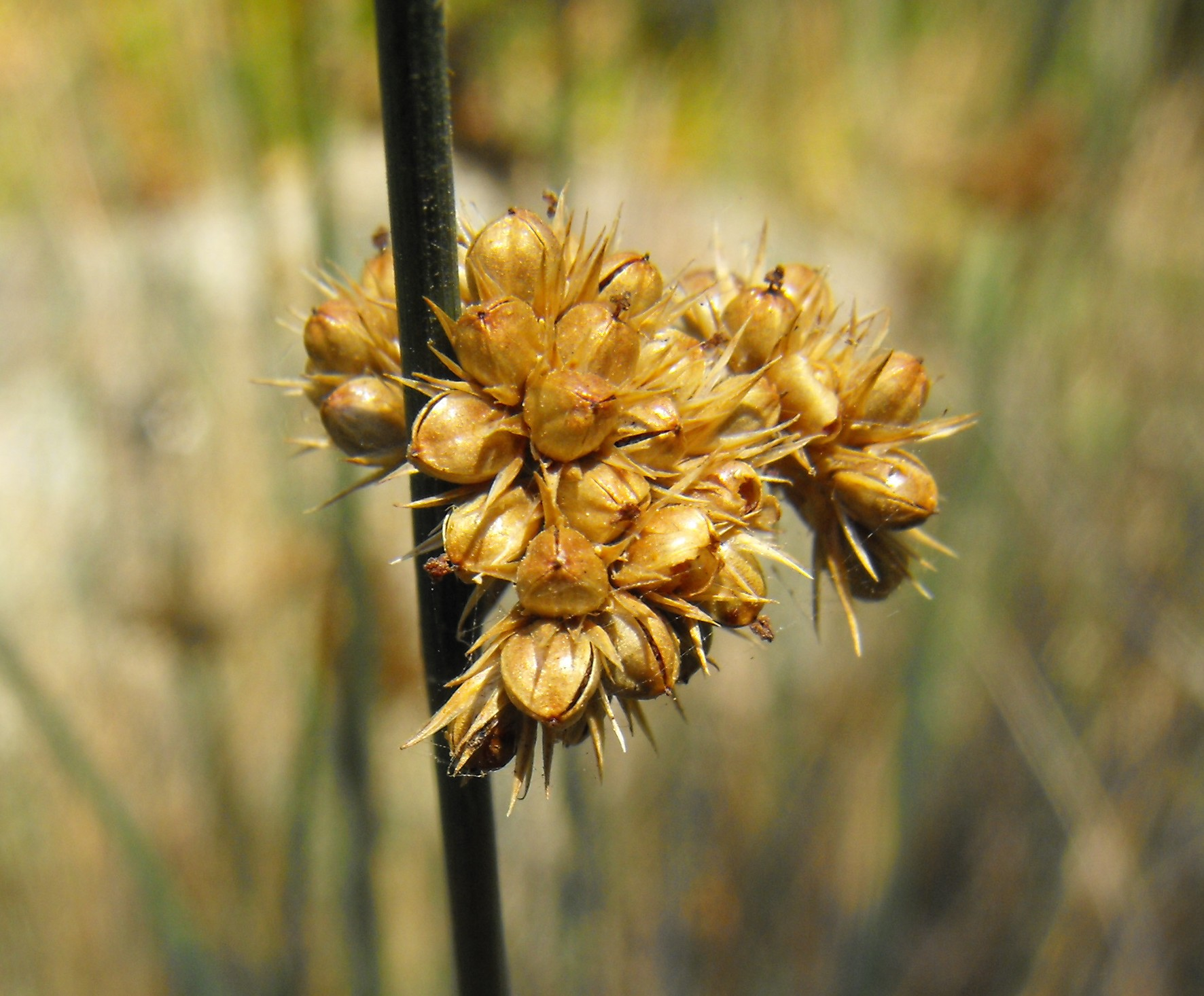
Fruit of Juncus patens

Juncus patens is a species of rush in the family Juncaceae. It is sometimes referred to by the common names spreading rush and California grey rush. It is native to the West Coast of the United States from Washington to California, and into Baja California, Mexico. It grows at seeps, springs, and riparian zones in stream beds and on river and pond banks, in marshes, and in other moist habitats.

== Description ==
Juncus patens is a perennial herb forming narrow, erect bunches of stems. It grows up to 3 feet (0.91 m) in height by 1–2 feet (0.30–0.61 m) in width. It spreads by rhizomes, which can increase a colonies width substantially.

The stems are thin, gray-green, often somewhat waxy, and grooved, and grow 30–90 centimetres (12–35 in) in height.

The inflorescence sprouts from the side of the stem, rather than its tip. It holds many flowers, each of which has short, narrow, pointed tepals and six stamens. It flowers in the summer.

The fruit is a spherical red or brown capsule which fills and bulges from the dried flower remnants when mature. The seeds attract birds.

== Cultivation ==
Juncus patens is cultivated as an ornamental plant, for use in traditional and wildlife gardens, and in natural landscaping design, and in habitat restoration projects. Its tall narrow form fits into narrow garden beds and planters adjacent to walkway walls, and in container planting. Despite its moist habitat origins, it can be very drought-tolerant when established.

In sustainable gardening and sustainable landscaping, Juncus patens is used in rain gardens and phytoremediation swales and intermittent ponds.

=== Cultivars ===
Cultivars of Juncus patens, selected for blue and/or gray foliage emphasis, include:

- Juncus patens 'Carman's Grey' — Carmen's California Gray Rush, steely blue-gray.
- Juncus patens 'Elk Blue' — Elk Blue California Gray Rush, blue-gray.
- Juncus patens 'Occidental Blue' — Occidental Blue California Gray Rush, gray-green.
