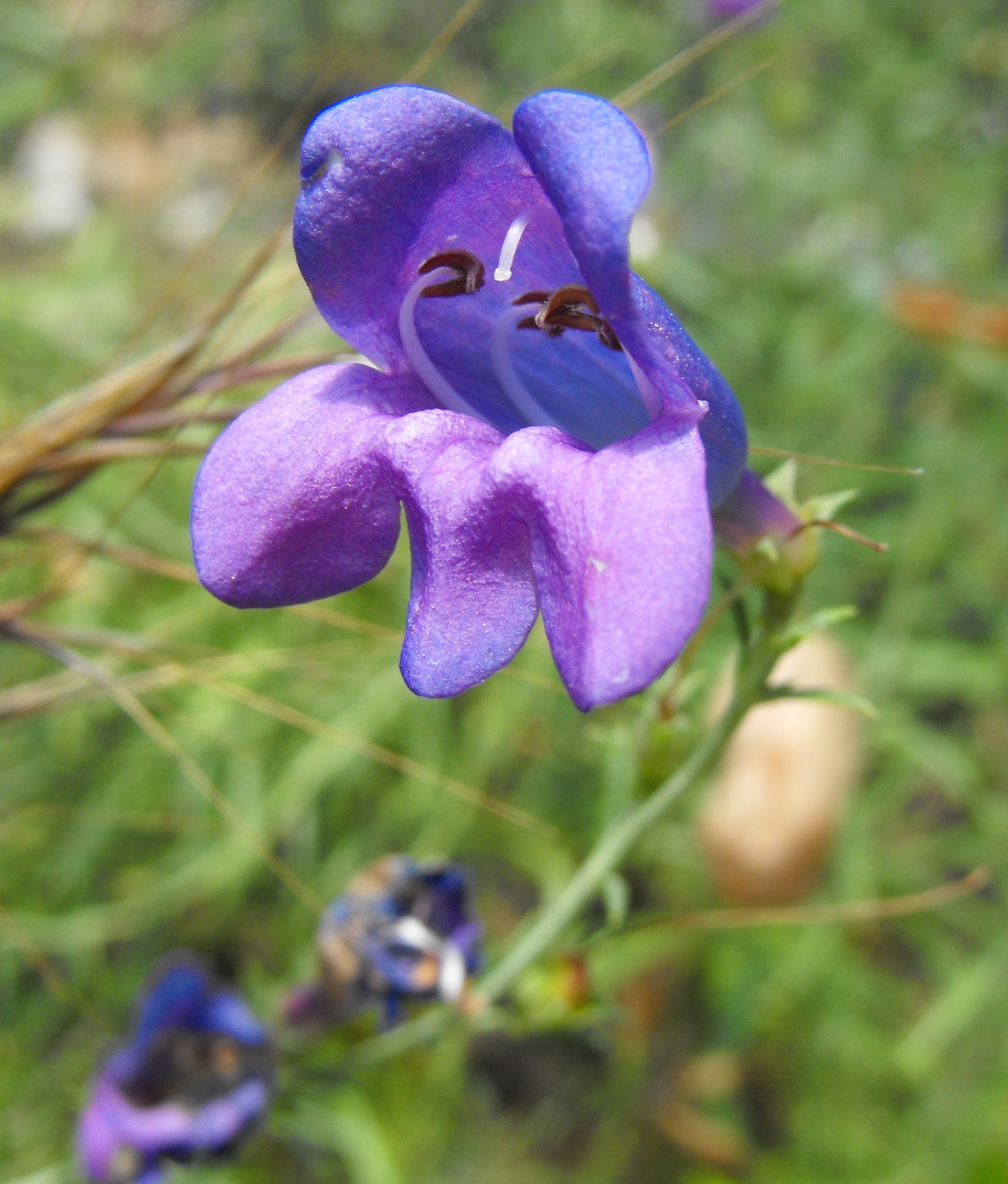

Conservation status
- Secure (NatureServe)

Scientific classification
- Kingdom: Plantae
- Clade: Tracheophytes
- Clade: Angiosperms
- Clade: Eudicots
- Clade: Asterids
- Order: Lamiales
- Family: Plantaginaceae
- Genus: Penstemon
- Species: P. heterophyllus

Binomial name
- Penstemon heterophyllus Lindl.

= Penstemon heterophyllus =

Species of flowering plant

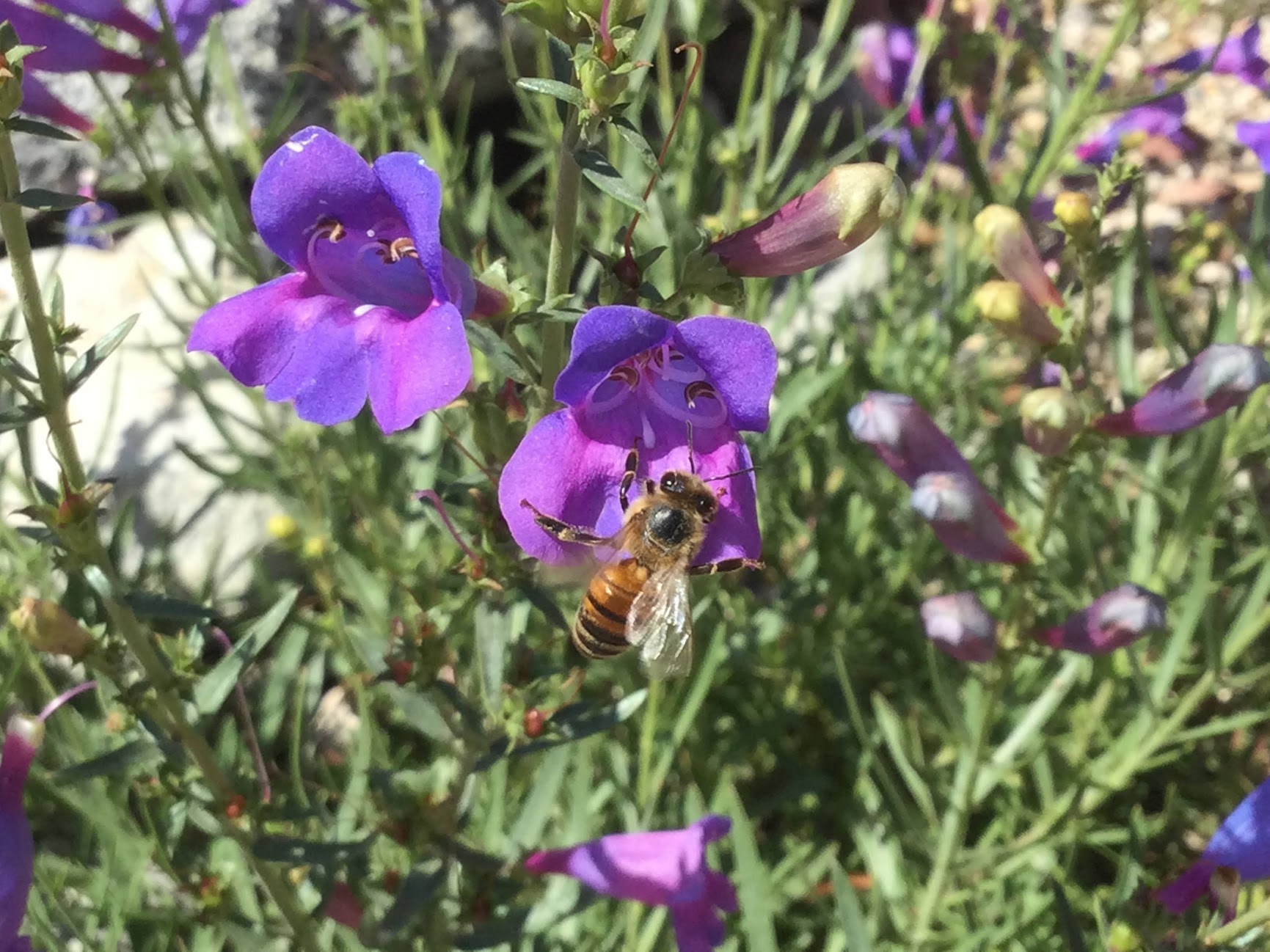
A Western honey bee drinking Penstemon heterophyllus nectar

Penstemon heterophyllus is a species of penstemon known by the common names bunchleaf penstemon, foothill penstemon, and foothill beardtongue. It is endemic to California.

The plant can be found in all of the major coastal mountain ranges and the northern Sierra Nevada foothills. It is a member of the flora in many local habitat types such as: hillsides, grasslands, chaparral, and open oak woodland and forest areas.

== Description ==
Penstemon heterophyllus is a perennial herb producing upright, branching stems easily exceeding one meter in height and becoming woody at the bases. The leaves are variable in shape and may reach nearly 10 centimeters long. The inflorescence produces several wide-mouthed tubular flowers up to 4 centimeters in length. The flowers may be shades of blue or purple to nearly magenta.

== Cultivation ==
Penstemon heterophyllus is cultivated as an ornamental plant by plant nurseries. It is used as a flowering perennial for traditional flower beds, and in native plant, drought-tolerant, and habitat gardens and public landscapes. It is a nectar source for (native) birds and butterflies.

Several cultivars have been selected for flower color and plant form, for use in Mediterranean climate and other low-water-use gardens, including:

- Penstemon heterophyllus 'Electric Blue' — intense blue flowers.
- Penstemon heterophyllus 'Margarita BOP' — sky blue to reddish purple flowers.
- Penstemon heterophyllus 'Blue Springs' — bright blue flowers.
