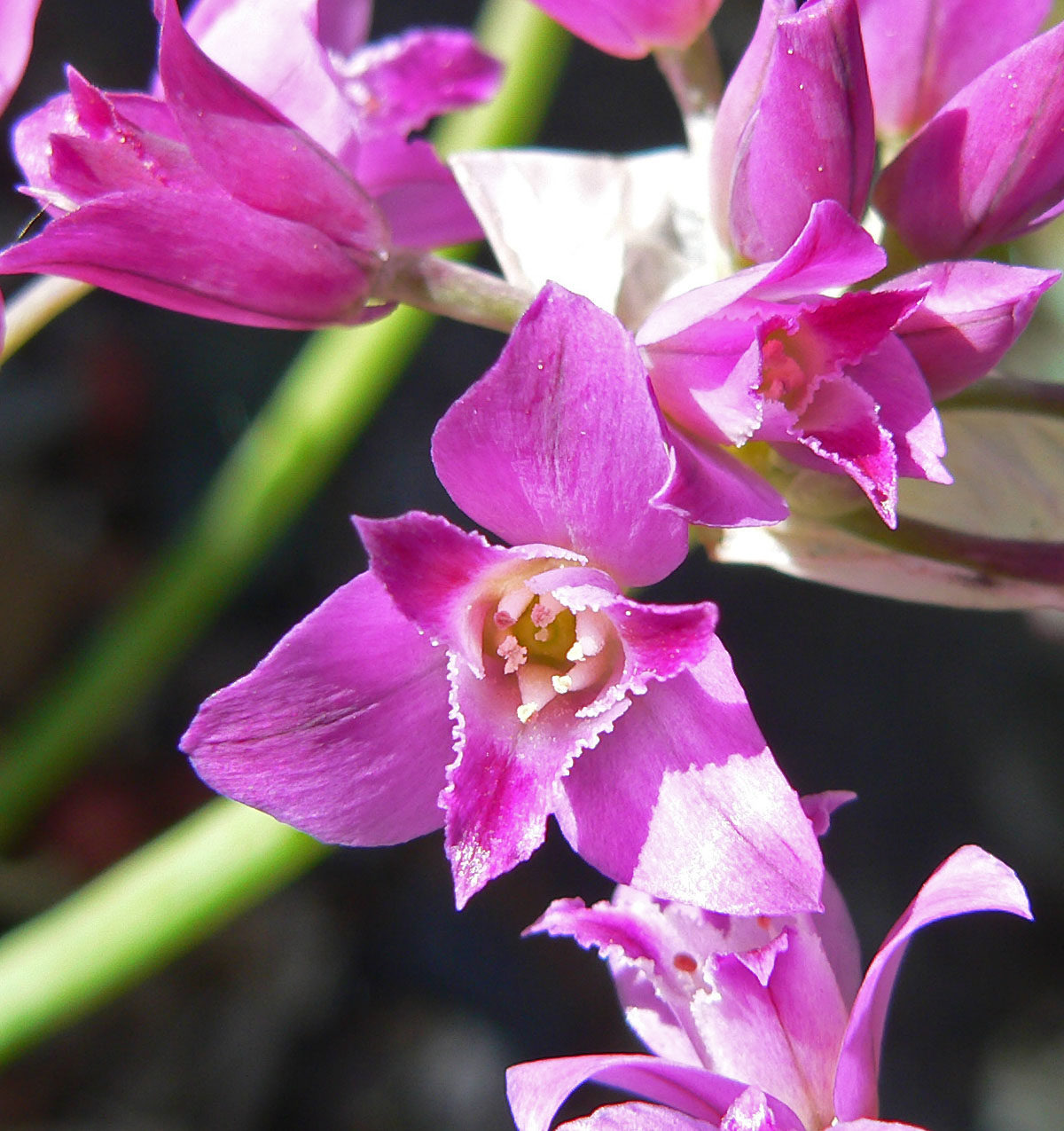

Conservation status
- Vulnerable (NatureServe)

Scientific classification
- Kingdom: Plantae
- Clade: Tracheophytes
- Clade: Angiosperms
- Clade: Monocots
- Order: Asparagales
- Family: Amaryllidaceae
- Subfamily: Allioideae
- Genus: Allium
- Subgenus: A. subg. Amerallium
- Species: A. crispum

Binomial name
- Allium crispum Greene

Synonyms
- Allium peninsulare var. crispum (Greene) Jeps.

= Allium crispum =

Crinkled onion

Species of flowering plant

Allium crispum is a species of wild onion known by the common name crinkled onion. It is endemic to California, where it grows along the Central Coast in the Coast Ranges and in the Santa Monica Mountains, often in clays and serpentine soils. It is a perennial herb that is typically found in the foothill woodlands and valley grasslands of California.

== Description ==
Allium crispum grows from a bulb one to one and a half centimeters wide and sends up naked green stems topped with inflorescences of many flowers, each on a short pedicel. The flowers are magenta in color and have six triangular tepals. The inner three tepals are smaller and crinkled like cloth and may curl under. Anthers and pollen are yellow. The leaves are narrow and linear, typically slightly shorter than the stems and about 1.5 millimeters wide.

A. crispum reaches 10-20 centimeters tall. Flowers typically appear between March and June in the US. The plant prefers part shade.

== Gallery ==
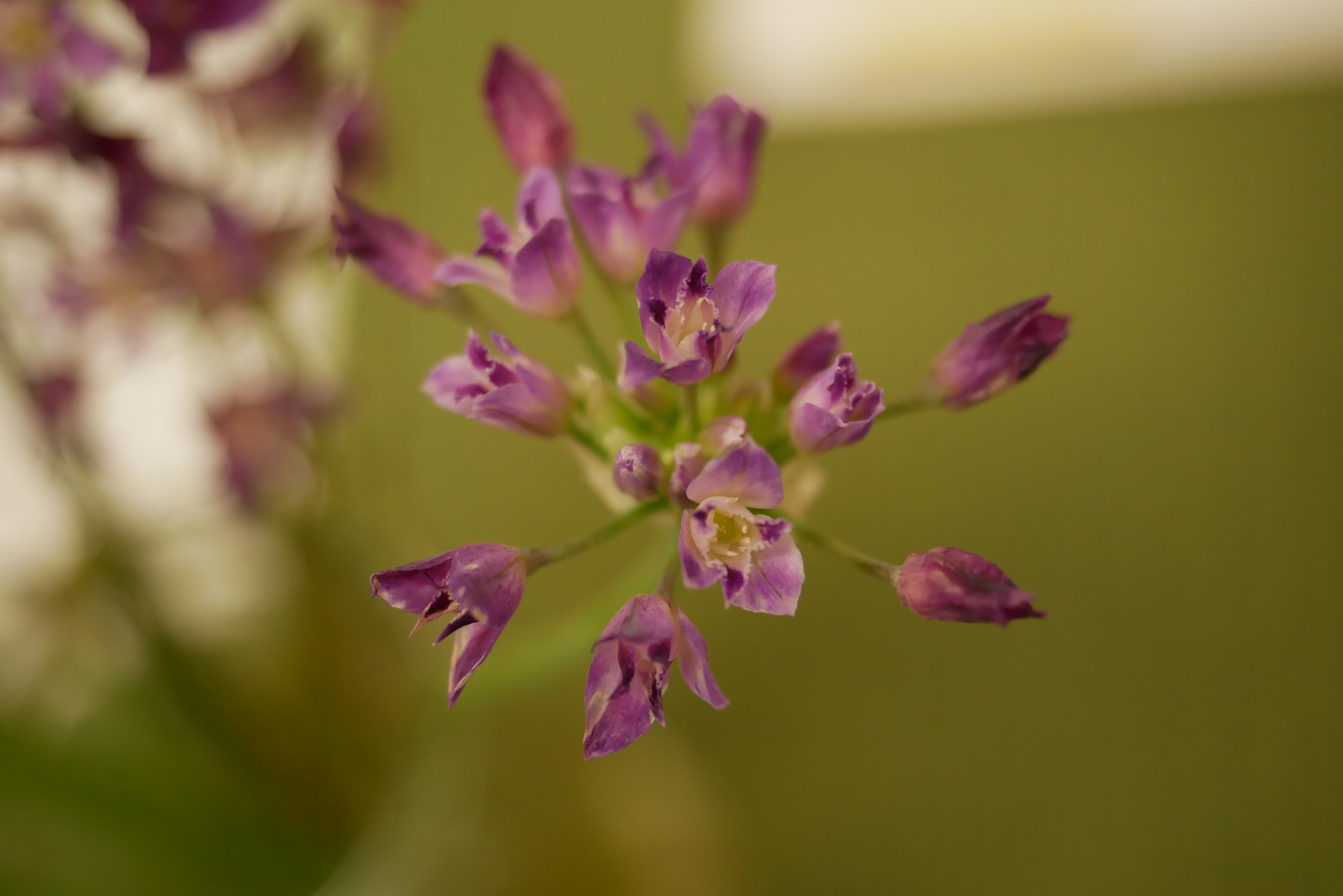

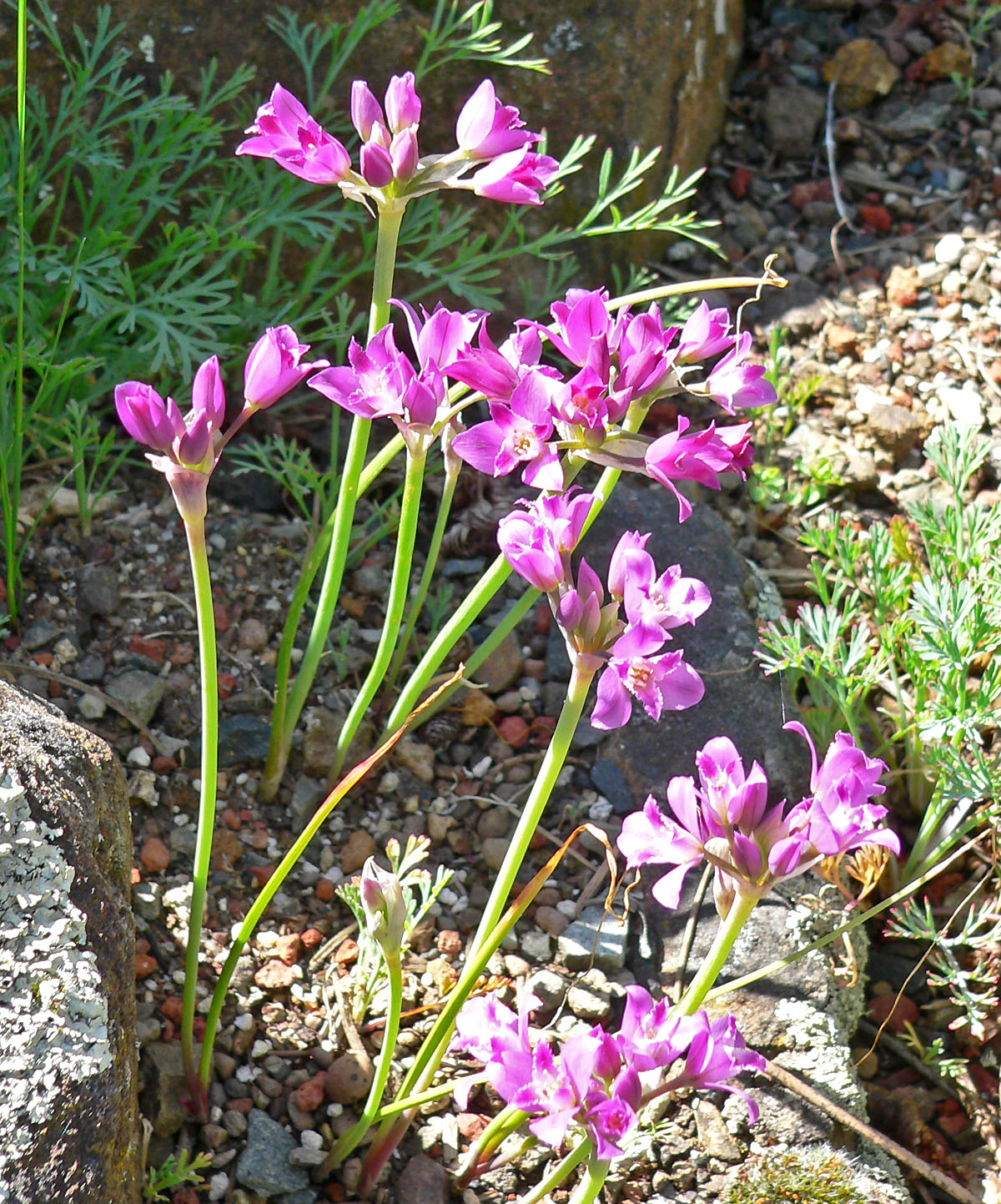

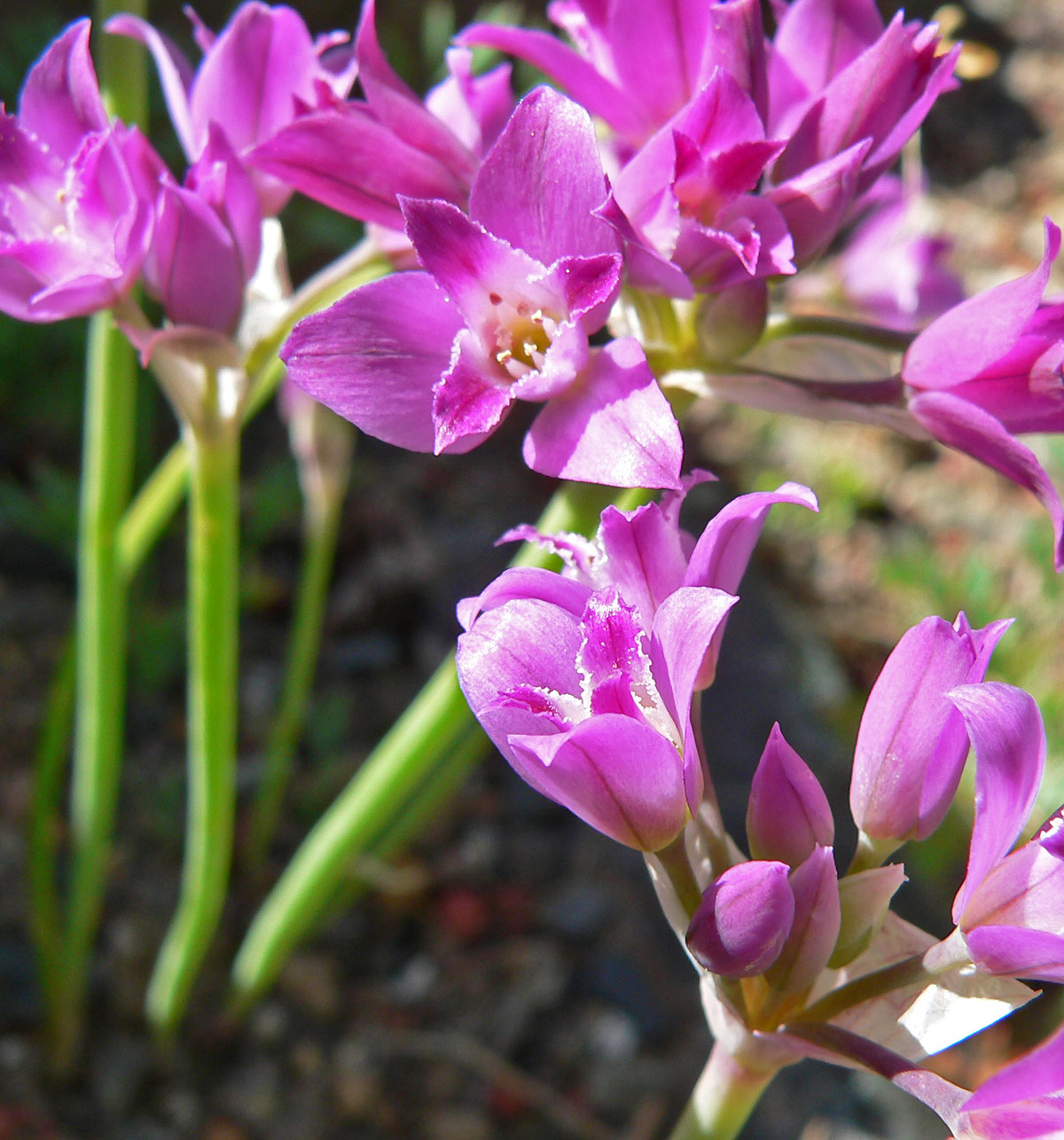

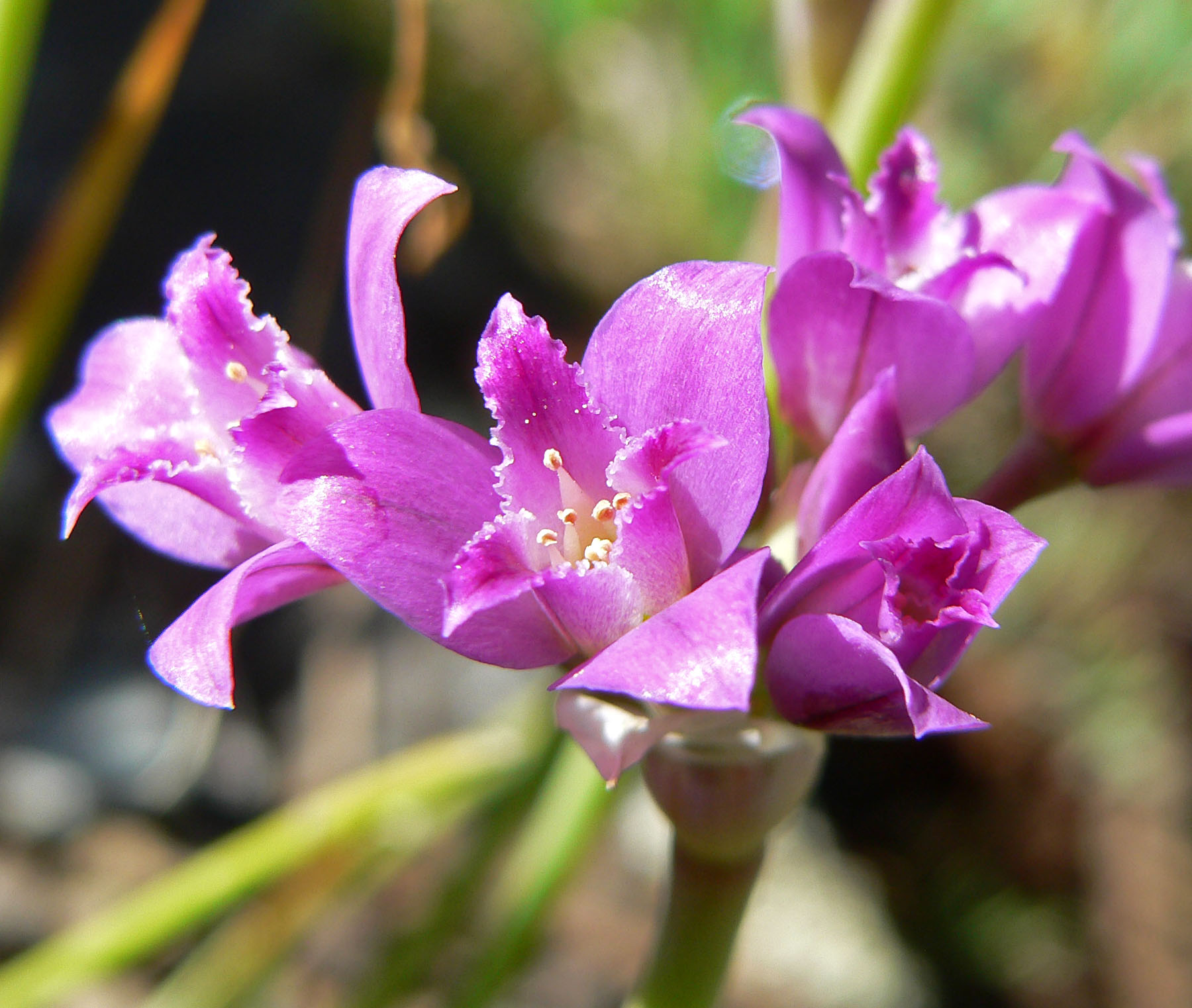

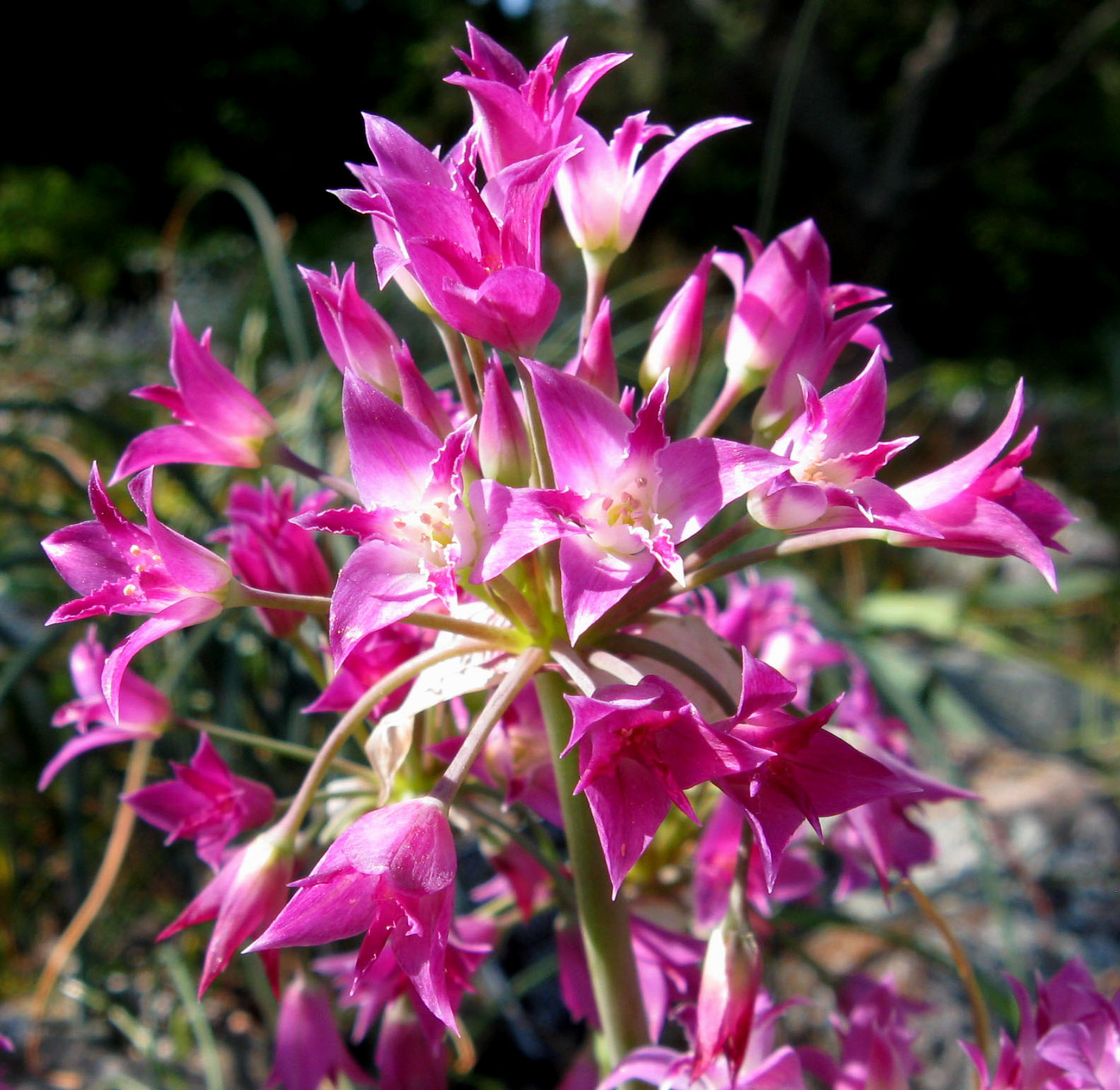

== See also ==
- California montane chaparral and woodlands
