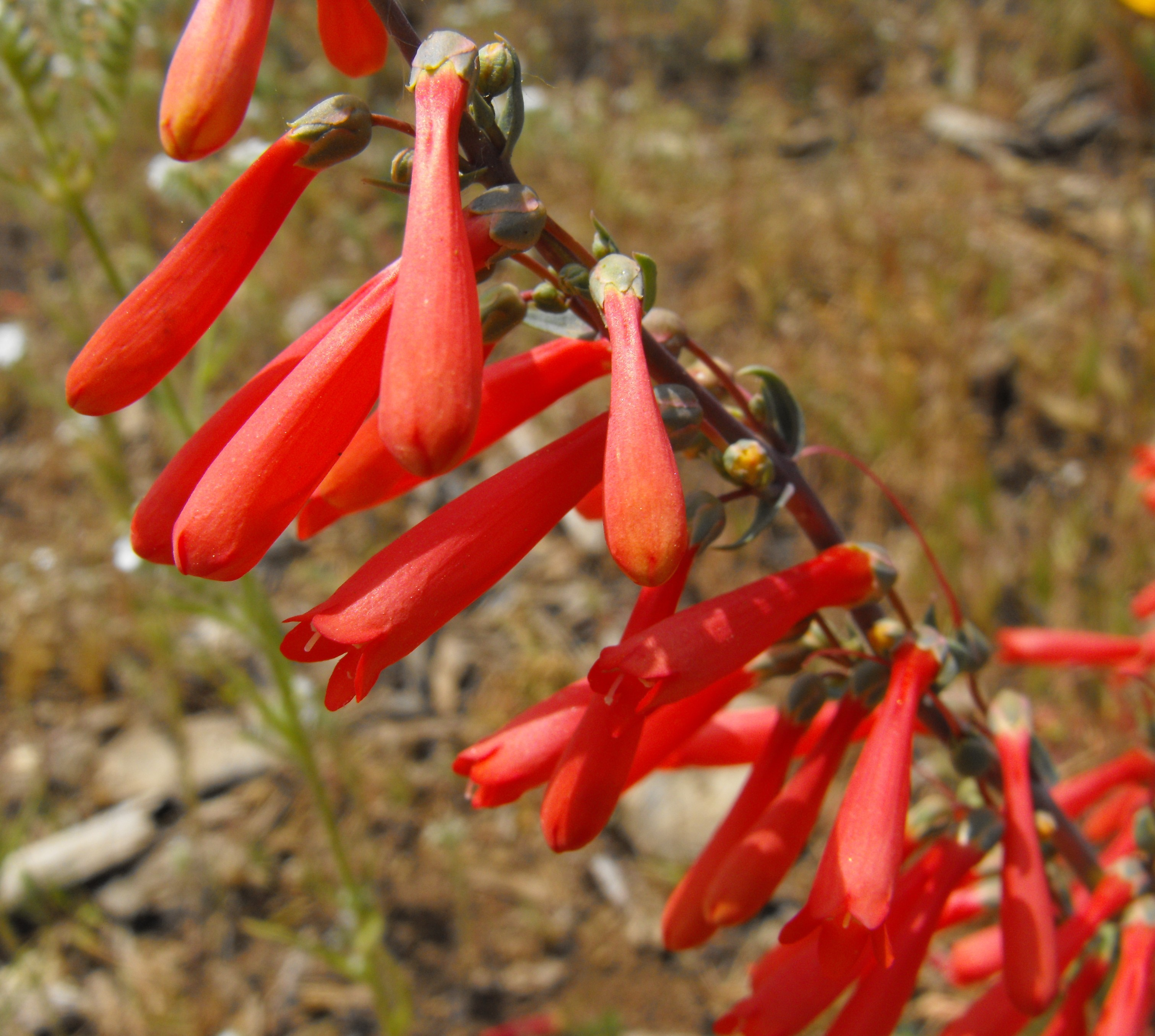

Conservation status
- Apparently Secure (NatureServe)

Scientific classification
- Kingdom: Plantae
- Clade: Tracheophytes
- Clade: Angiosperms
- Clade: Eudicots
- Clade: Asterids
- Order: Lamiales
- Family: Plantaginaceae
- Genus: Penstemon
- Species: P. centranthifolius

Binomial name
- Penstemon centranthifolius (Benth.) Benth.

Synonyms
- Chelone centranthifolia Benth.; Chelone cheilanthifolia Paxton

= Penstemon centranthifolius =

Plant species in the veronica family

Penstemon centranthifolius is a species of penstemon known by the common name scarlet bugler. It is native to California and parts of Mexico, where it grows in many types of dry habitat from coast to desert, such as chaparral and oak woodland.

== Description ==
Penstemon centranthifolius is a herbaceous plant that when mature will reach 30 to 120 centimeters in height. Its stems are hairless and may be erect or ascending, growing straight upwards or growing out slightly and then curving to grow upwards.

The leaves are cauline, attached to the stems rather than the base of the plant, and attached in five to eleven pairs on opposite sides of the stems. They are thick with smooth edges and the ones midway up the stems the longest. They range in size between 4 and 10 centimeters in length and 1 to 4 cm in width with ovate to lanceolate shape, egg shaped with a wider portion towards the base to resembling the head of a spear. Leaves may be attached directly to the stem or by a short petiole. The base of each leaf may be tapered or it may be auriculate-clasping, wrap partway around the stem with ear like projections.

The top of the stem is occupied by a long inflorescence bearing narrow tubular flowers 2.5 to 3.3 centimeters long. The inflorescence is usually 15 to 60 cm of the stem, but may occasionally be as much as 100 cm in length. The flowers are hairless with two lips that have projecting round to egg shaped lobes. The flowers are bright red to orange-red. Like the rest of the flower the staminode is hairless and will extend out of the flower's opening, it is 13 to 14 millimeters long overall. Flowering takes place from February to as late as July.

== Taxonomy ==
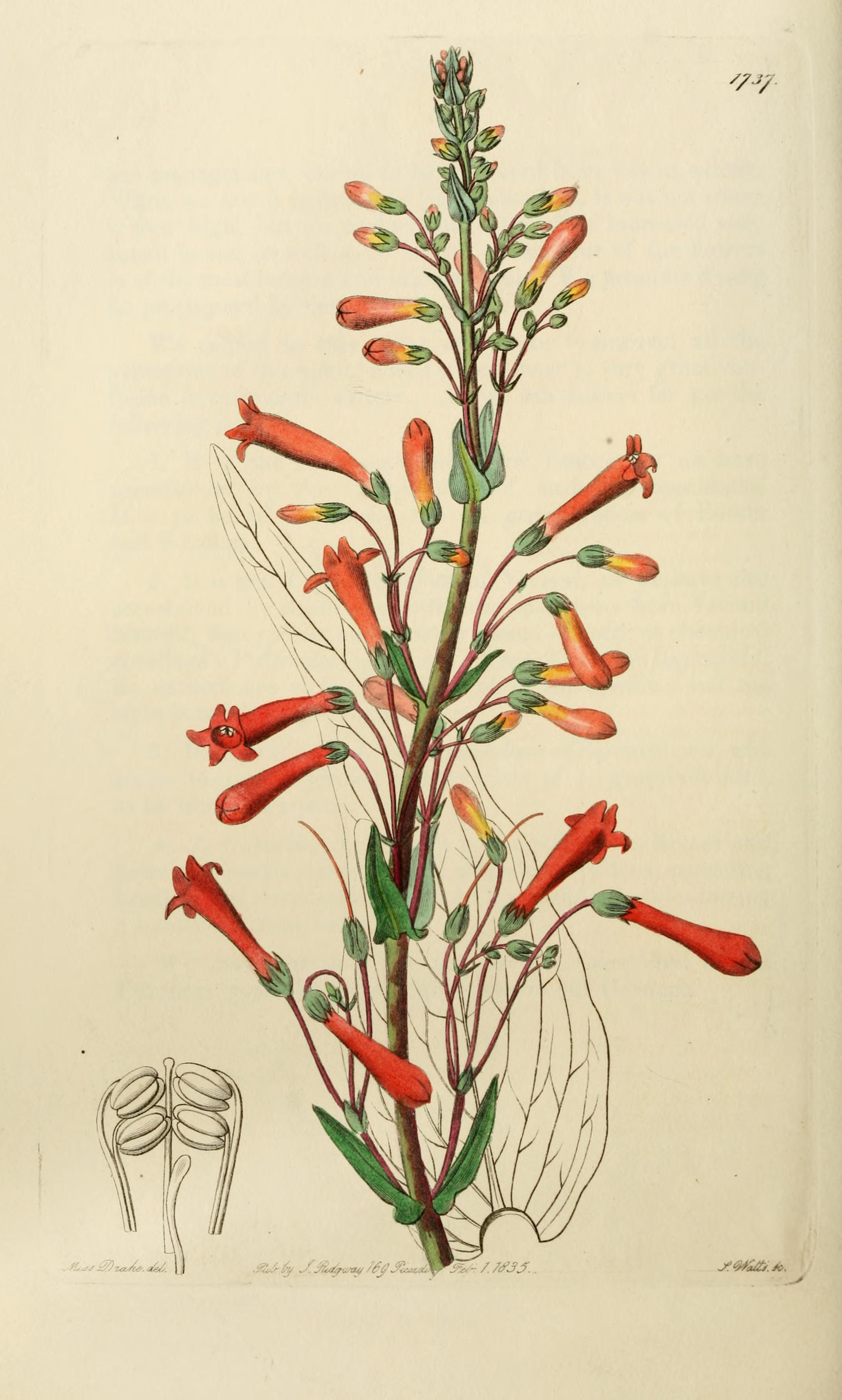
As Illustrated in The Botanical Register in 1835

Penstemon centranthifolius was scientifically described in a lecture delivered to the Horticultural Society of London by the botanist George Bentham 17 June 1834, but named Chelone centranthifolia. The next year this initial name was published in the Transactions of the Horticultural Society of London, but the same year Bentham published a different argument about how Chelone should be distinguished from Pentstemon in his book Scrophularinaea Indicae renaming the species as Penstemon centranthifolius.

=== Names ===
In English it is known by the common name scarlet bugler. It is also known as wild snapdragon. In the 1920s it was still occasionally called hummingbird's dinner horn because of visitation to the flowers by hummingbirds.

=== Hybrids ===
This species commonly hybridizes with showy penstemon (Penstemon spectabilis), a species with wide-mouthed purple-blue flowers, to produce a penstemon with pinkish-purple flowers which is intermediate in size and named Penstemon × parishii.

== Range and habitat ==
Penstemon centranthifolius is native to the US state of California and the Mexican state of Baja California. It grows as far north as Glenn County, California. They may be found in the California Coast Ranges, the Sacramento Valley, the San Joaquin Valley, in the foothills of the Sierra Nevada, the Mojave Desert, the Transverse Ranges, the San Jacinto Mountains, the South Coast, and the Channel Islands. in Baja California it mostly grows below 1,000 meters (3,300 ft) in the Sierra de Juárez south to Sierra de San Borja. Notable extensive occurrences are found in open areas in the Sierra de Juárez.

It grows in dry habitats such as open chaparral, California oak woodlands, Joshua tree woodlands, pinyon–juniper woodlands, pine forests, and with coastal sage scrub. In Baja California they grow on alluvial fans near mountains called bajadas, in canyons, and granitic hillsides.

=== Conservation ===
The conservation organization NatureServe evaluated Penstemon centranthifolius in 1986. At that time they rated it as apparently secure globally (G4).

== See also ==
- California chaparral and woodlands
- List of Penstemon species
