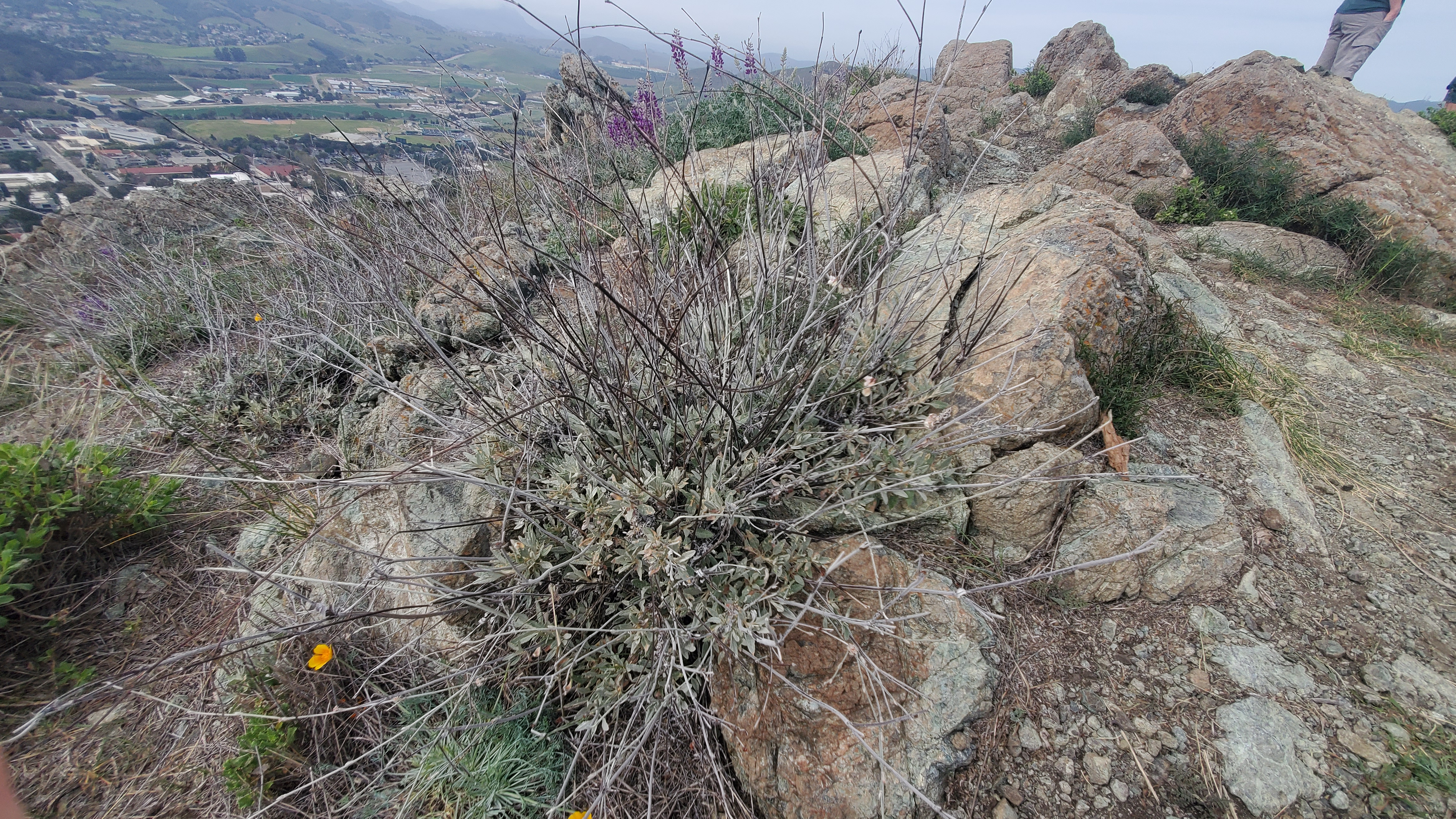

Scientific classification
- Kingdom: Plantae
- Clade: Tracheophytes
- Clade: Angiosperms
- Clade: Eudicots
- Order: Caryophyllales
- Family: Polygonaceae
- Genus: Eriogonum
- Species: E. elongatum

Binomial name
- Eriogonum elongatum Benth. (1844)

= Eriogonum elongatum =

Species of plant

Eriogonum elongatum, commonly known as longstem buckwheat or wand buckwheat, is a species of wild buckwheat native to coastal southern and Baja California.

== Description ==
Eriogonum elongatum is a perennial herb reaching a height of 0.6–1.2 meters (2.0–3.9 feet) with cauline leaves approximately 1–3 centimeters (0.39–1.18 inches) long and 0.5–2 centimeters (0.20–0.79 inches) wide. Its leaves and stem are generally tomentose. It has a haploid number of n=34.

== Habitat ==
Eriogonum elongatum primarily grows in coastal sage scrub, foothill woodland, and chaparral ecosystems in and around the Coast, Transverse, and Peninsular Ranges of California from 60–1,900 metres (200–6,230 feet) above sea level. As with many other Eriogonum species, Eriogonum elongatum is a bodenvag species, tolerant of a relatively wide pH range of 5–8.2, and is tolerant of serpentinite soils that are common throughout its range, though it is not endemic to serpentine-derived soils.

Eriogonum elongatum supports several organisms in its habitat, including native bees, parasitic and predatory insects, and butterflies. Hosted butterflies include the Mormon metalmark (Apodemia mormo), Bramble Hairstreak Butterfly (Callophrys perplexa), Comstock's Hairstreak (Callophrys sheridanii comstocki), Bernardino Dotted-Blue (Euphilotes bernardino), Small Dotted-Blue (Philotiella speciosa), Acmon Blue (Plebejus acmon), and Lupine Blue (Plebejus lupini).

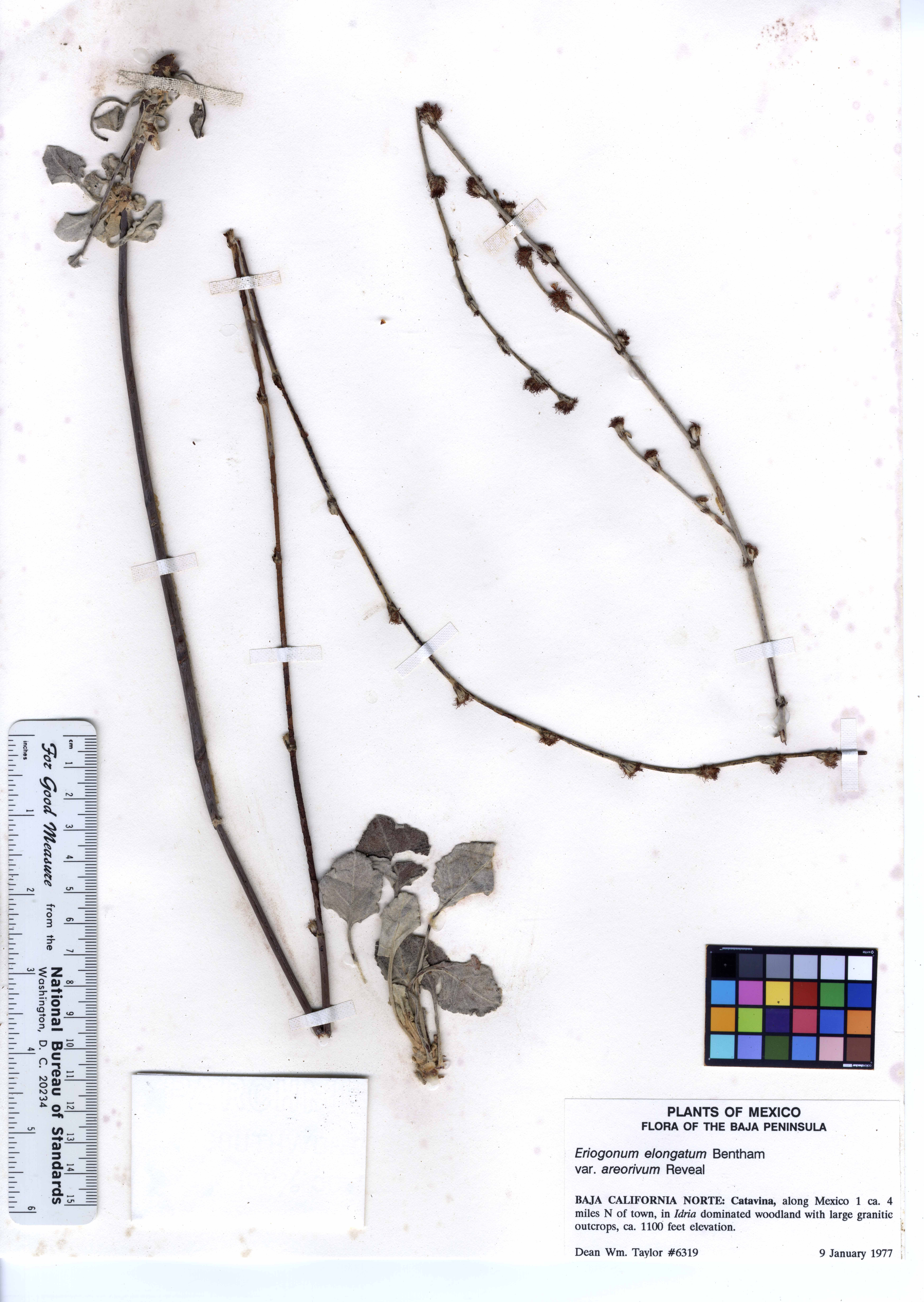
Herbarium sample of Eriogonum elongatum var. areorivum collected in Baja California.

== Varieties ==
Eriogonum elongatum has three described varieties:

- Eriogonum elongatum var. areorivum
- Eriogonum elongatum var. elongatum
- Eriogonum elongatum var. vollmeri
