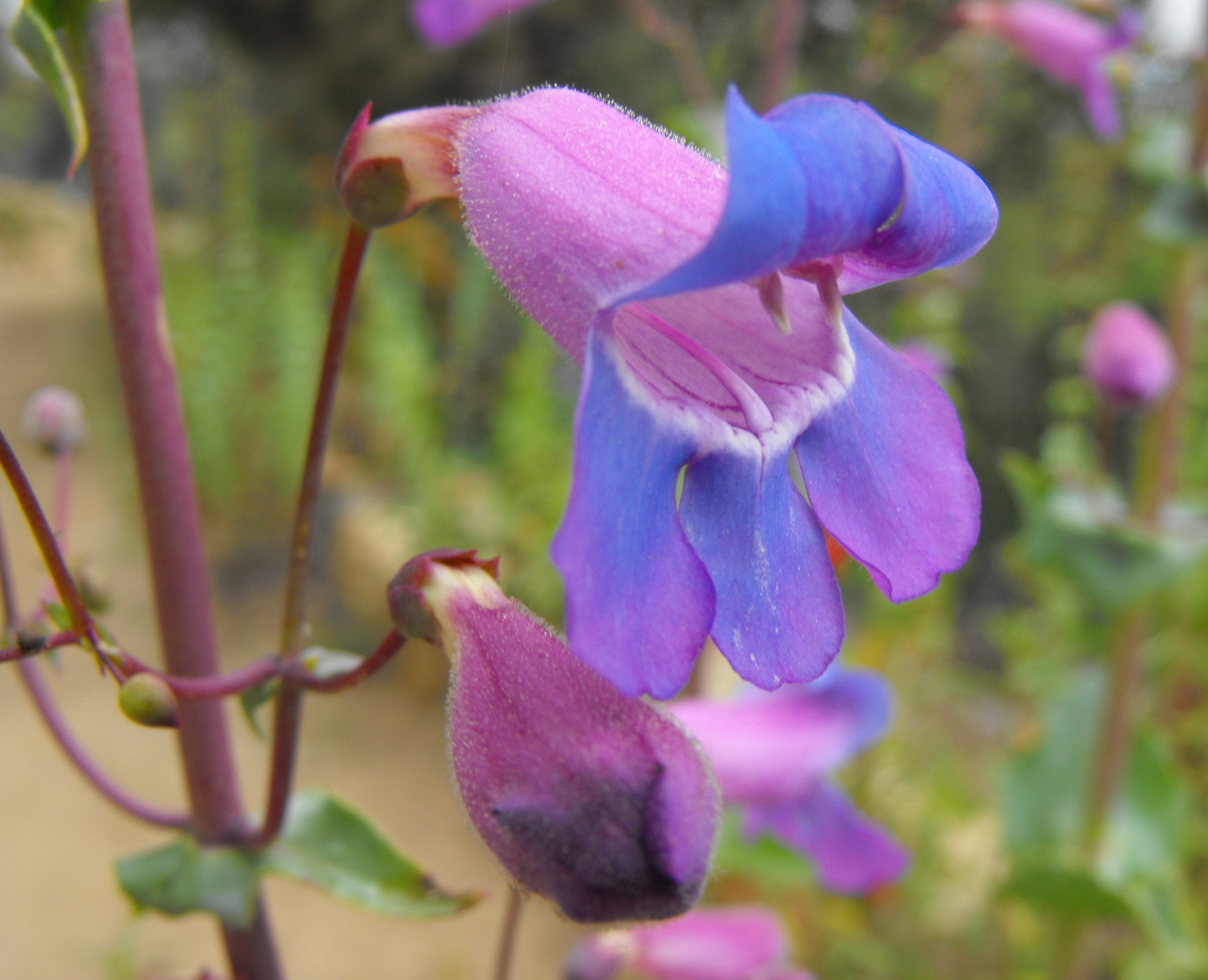

Conservation status
- Apparently Secure (NatureServe)

Scientific classification
- Kingdom: Plantae
- Clade: Embryophytes
- Clade: Tracheophytes
- Clade: Spermatophytes
- Clade: Angiosperms
- Clade: Eudicots
- Clade: Asterids
- Order: Lamiales
- Family: Plantaginaceae
- Genus: Penstemon
- Species: P. spectabilis

Binomial name
- Penstemon spectabilis Thurb. ex A.Gray

= Penstemon spectabilis =

Species of flowering plant

Penstemon spectabilis is a species of penstemon known by the common name showy penstemon or showy beardtongue. It is a perennial herb native to southern California and Baja California, where it grows in the chaparral, scrub, and woodlands of the coastal mountain ranges.

== Description ==
Penstemon spectabilis is a perennial herb that grows in an upright or mounding fashion, attaining a maximum height of 2-4 feet and a maximum width of 3-4 feet during its 5-10 year lifespan.

The thin leaves are lance-shaped to oval, toothed on the edges, and up to 10 centimeters in length. The oppositely arranged pairs may fuse about the stem at the bases.

The inflorescence bears wide-mouthed, tubular violet or purple-blue flowers which may be over 3 centimeters long.. The flowers have reddish-purpose nectar guides. The throat is lighter in color, lavender to nearly white.

Its fruit is a capsule, and the plant is known to self-seed.

== Taxonomy ==
=== Varieties ===
- Penstemon spectabilis var. spectabilis

The nominate variety. The inflorescence is glabrous (lacking hair). This variety is distributed across the San Gabriel and San Bernardino Mountains, and the Peninsular Ranges from California to Mexico, reaching its southern distribution at northwest the foothills of the Sierra de San Pedro Martir in Baja California.

- Penstemon spectabilis var. subinteger (D.D. Keck) C.C. Freeman

A variety endemic to Baja California, commonly known as the Peninsular showy beardtongue, found from the vicinity of San Telmo and San Quintin south to the Bahia de Los Angeles.

- Penstemon spectabilis var. subvicosus (D.D. Keck) McMinn

This variety has a glandular inflorescence. Native to the Transverse Ranges of California.

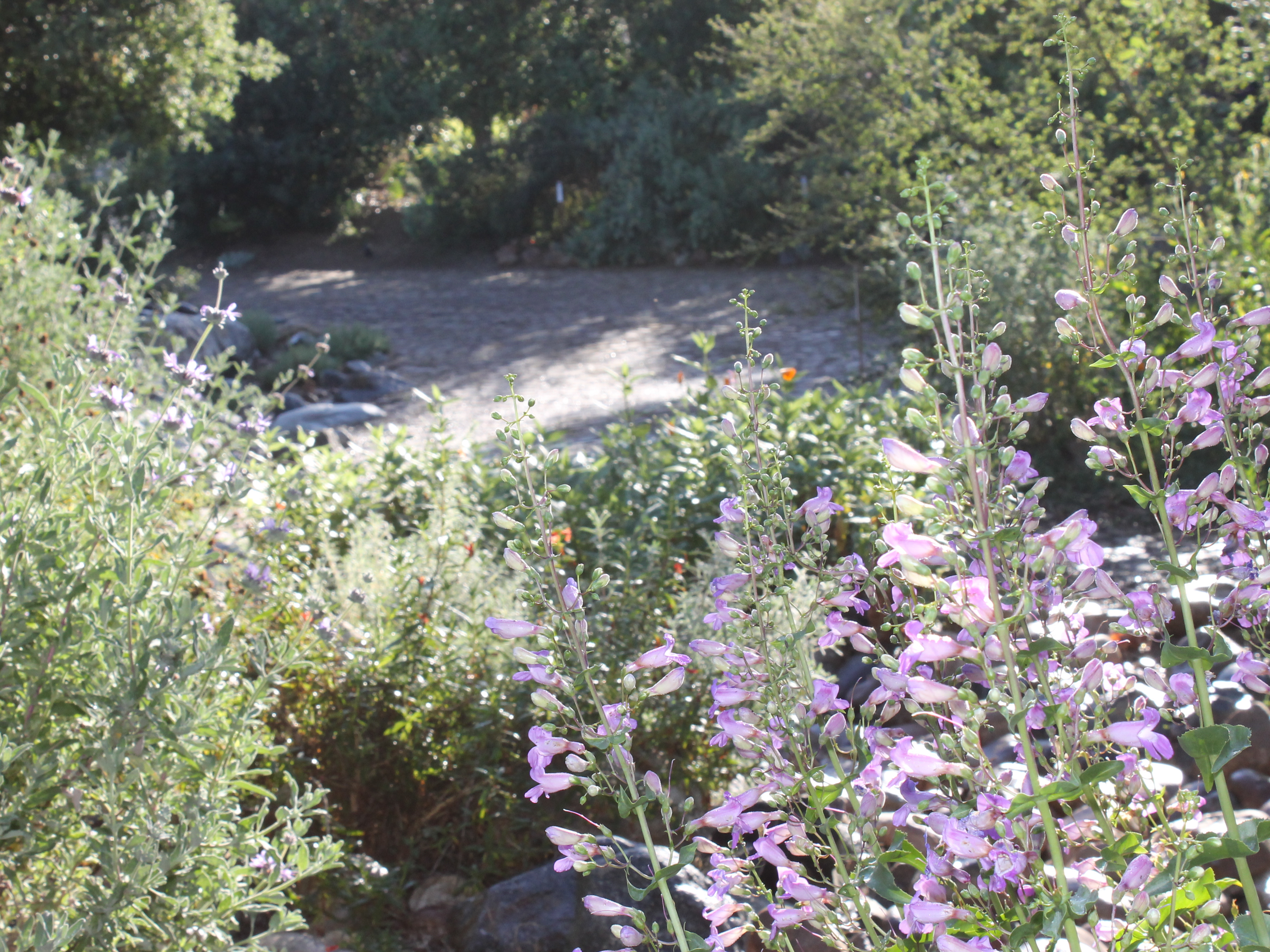
Penstemon spectabilis

== Distribution and habitat ==
P. spectabilis is native to the mountains of southern California and Baja California. It grows below 6000 feet in elevation on rocky slopes in dry washes and disturbed areas as part of chaparral or coastal sage scrub communities. It does best in full sun on well-drained, often rocky soils. In Baja California it found from Tecate in the north to the hills southeast of El Rosario.

== Ecology ==
P. spectabilis blooms from April to June or July and is pollinated by wasps such as Pseudomasaris vespoides, as well as by hummingbirds. Occasional rain in the summer causes the plant to flower more abundantly, but may also shorten the plant's lifespan.
