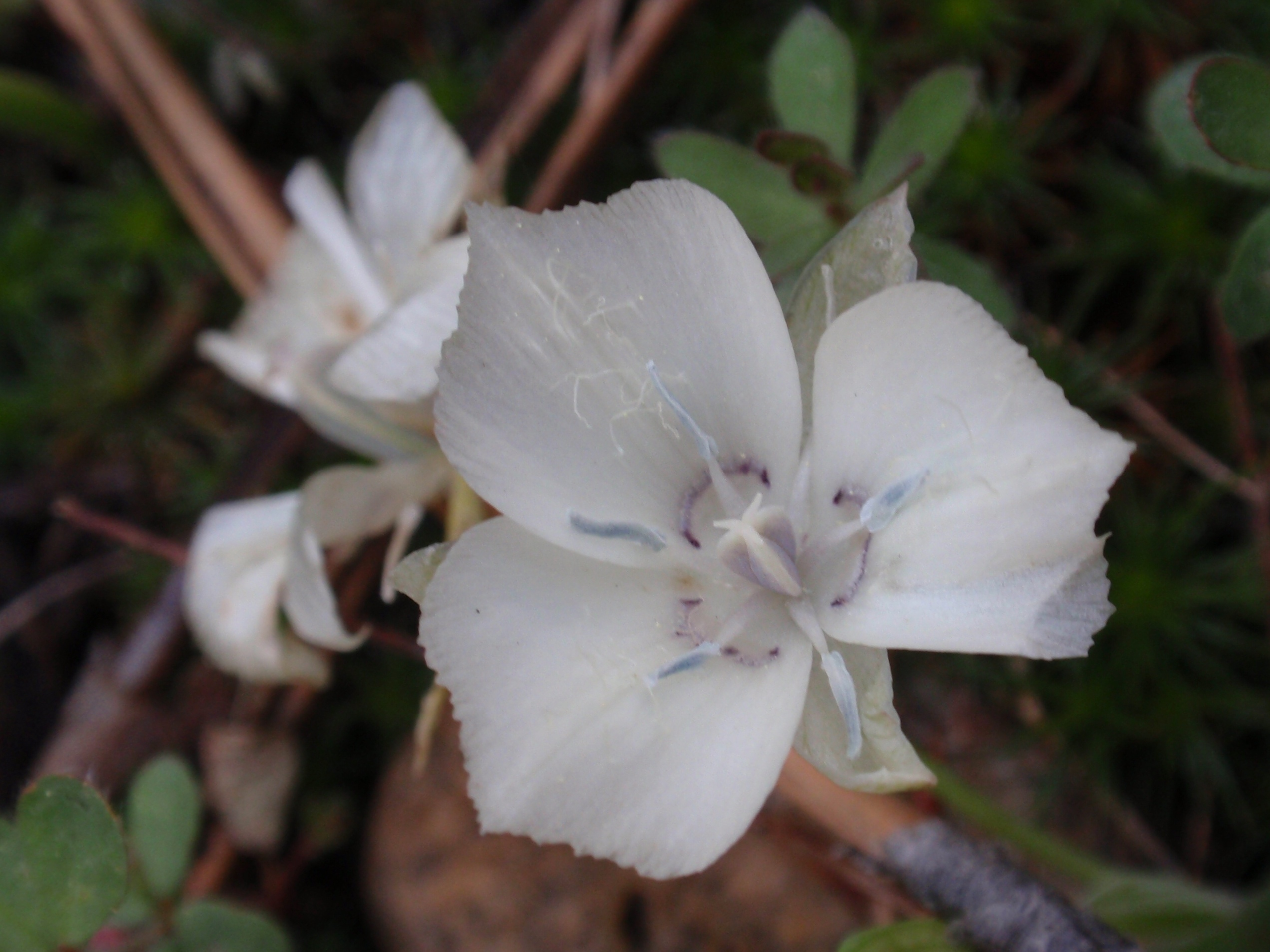

Conservation status
- Apparently Secure (NatureServe)

Scientific classification
- Kingdom: Plantae
- Clade: Tracheophytes
- Clade: Angiosperms
- Clade: Monocots
- Order: Liliales
- Family: Liliaceae
- Genus: Calochortus
- Species: C. minimus

Binomial name
- Calochortus minimus Ownbey

Synonyms
- Calochortus elegans var. subclavatus Baker

= Calochortus minimus =

Species of flower

Calochortus minimus is a California species of flowering plants in the lily family known by the common name Sierra mariposa lily.

== Description ==
Calochortus minimus is a perennial herb producing an unbranching stem no taller than 10 centimeters. The basal leaf is 10 to 20 centimeters long and does not wither at flowering. The inflorescence bears up to 10 erect, bell-shaped flowers. Each flower has three pointed sepals and three small white petals. The fruit is a winged capsule up to 2 centimeters long.

== Distribution and habitat ==
Calochortus minimus is endemic to the Sierra Nevada of California, where it is a common member of the flora along mountain lakesides from Plumas County to Tulare County.
