= Calochortus monanthus =

Conservation status
- Presumed Extinct (NatureServe)

Scientific classification
- Kingdom: Plantae
- Clade: Tracheophytes
- Clade: Angiosperms
- Clade: Monocots
- Order: Liliales
- Family: Liliaceae
- Genus: Calochortus
- Species: C. monanthus

Binomial name
- Calochortus monanthus Ownbey

Extinct species of flowering plant

Calochortus monanthus is a presumed extinct North American species of flowering plant in the lily family known by the common names single-flowered mariposa lily and Shasta River mariposa lily. It was endemic to northern California.

It is presumed extinct, having been collected and documented once over a century ago and never found again. The single known specimen was collected by botanist Edward Lee Greene from a meadow on the banks of the Shasta River, near Yreka in Siskiyou County, California, in June 1876.

== Description ==
Calochortus monanthus had an unbranching stem and an inflorescence of a single erect, bell-shaped flower on a long peduncle. The flower had three sepals about 4 centimeters long and three toothed petals each between 4 and 5 centimeters. The petals were pinkish with a dark red spot at each base.
