= Calochortus foliosus =

Scientific classification
- Kingdom: Plantae
- Clade: Tracheophytes
- Clade: Angiosperms
- Clade: Monocots
- Order: Liliales
- Family: Liliaceae
- Genus: Calochortus
- Species: C. foliosus

Binomial name
- Calochortus foliosus Ownbey

Species of flowering plant

Calochortus foliosus is a bulbous plant of the lily family. It is sometimes known by the common name leafy cyclobothra and belongs to subsection Purpurei within section Cyclobothra in the genus Calochortus. It occurs in mountainous central Mexico. Little is known about the species aside from the information provided in the original description.

== Description ==
Calochortus foliosus is a bulbous perennial herb with bell-shaped flowers that are described as blueish in the original description. Its inflorescence can grow to a height of 40 cm and bears 1 to 2 flowers. The flowers are campanulate and nodding (drooping and facing downward). Few specimens of this species exist.

Like other members of section Cyclobothra, C. foliosus presumably forms bulb coats that are thick and coarsely hairy, appearing like a fibrous net. It contains bulbils in its leaf axils, which is characteristic of members of subsection Purpurei. If it resembles other members of the Purpurei, its flowers have sparse trichomes.

== Distribution and habitat ==
C. foliosus is known only from the Mexican state Michoacán in the vicinity of Morelia. Its only known locality is in mountainous habitat at an elevation of 2200m. It experiences rain in the summer and cool, dry weather in the winter, during which it is dormant.

== Taxonomy and naming ==
C. foliosus was first collected by Arsène Brouard, a French monk, on 14 September 1911. Its type locality is listed as "Campanario, 2200m." The type specimen was described in 1940 by Marion Ownbey in his treatise A Monograph of the Genus Calochortus. Isotypes exist in the California Academy of Sciences; only three records ever are recorded in the digital records of the Global Biodiversity Information Facility.

== Cultivation ==
Little to nothing is known about the cultivation of C. foliosus, but it is presumed to be winter dormant. Based on its habitat, it should be watered in the summer and kept dry and cool in the winter.
