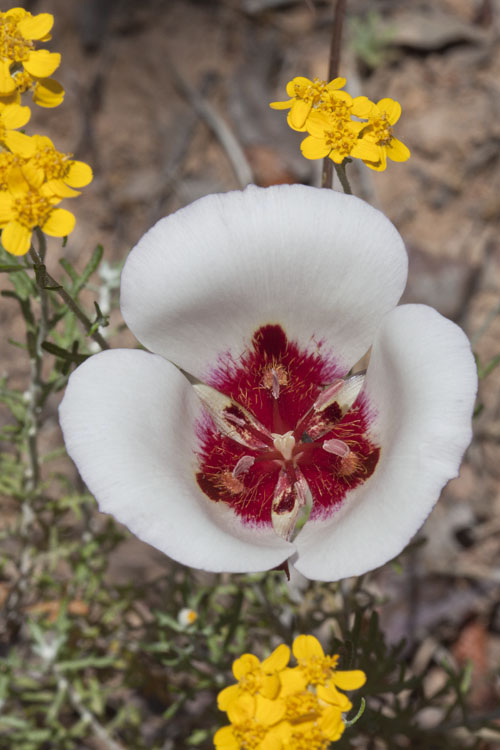

Conservation status
- Imperiled (NatureServe)

Scientific classification
- Kingdom: Plantae
- Clade: Tracheophytes
- Clade: Angiosperms
- Clade: Monocots
- Order: Liliales
- Family: Liliaceae
- Genus: Calochortus
- Species: C. simulans

Binomial name
- Calochortus simulans (Hoover) Munz

Synonyms
- Mariposa simulans Hoover

= Calochortus simulans =

Species of flowering plant

Calochortus simulans is a California species of flowering plant in the lily family known by the common name San Luis Obispo mariposa lily, not to be confused with the San Luis mariposa lily C. obispoensis.

== Distribution ==
It is native to San Luis Obispo County, California, and its range extends south into the northern part of Santa Barbara County.

== Description ==
Calochortus simulans is a perennial herb producing a branching stem up to 60 centimetres (24 inches) tall. The basal leaf is 10 to 20 centimetres (4 to 8 inches) long and withers by flowering. The inflorescence is a loose cluster of 1 to 3 erect, bell-shaped flowers. Each flower has three curving sepals and three longer petals, each up to 5 centimetres (2 inches) long. The petals are white to yellow with a deep red spot at the base. The fruit is an angled capsule 5 or 6 centimetres (2 or 2 1/3 inches) in length.
