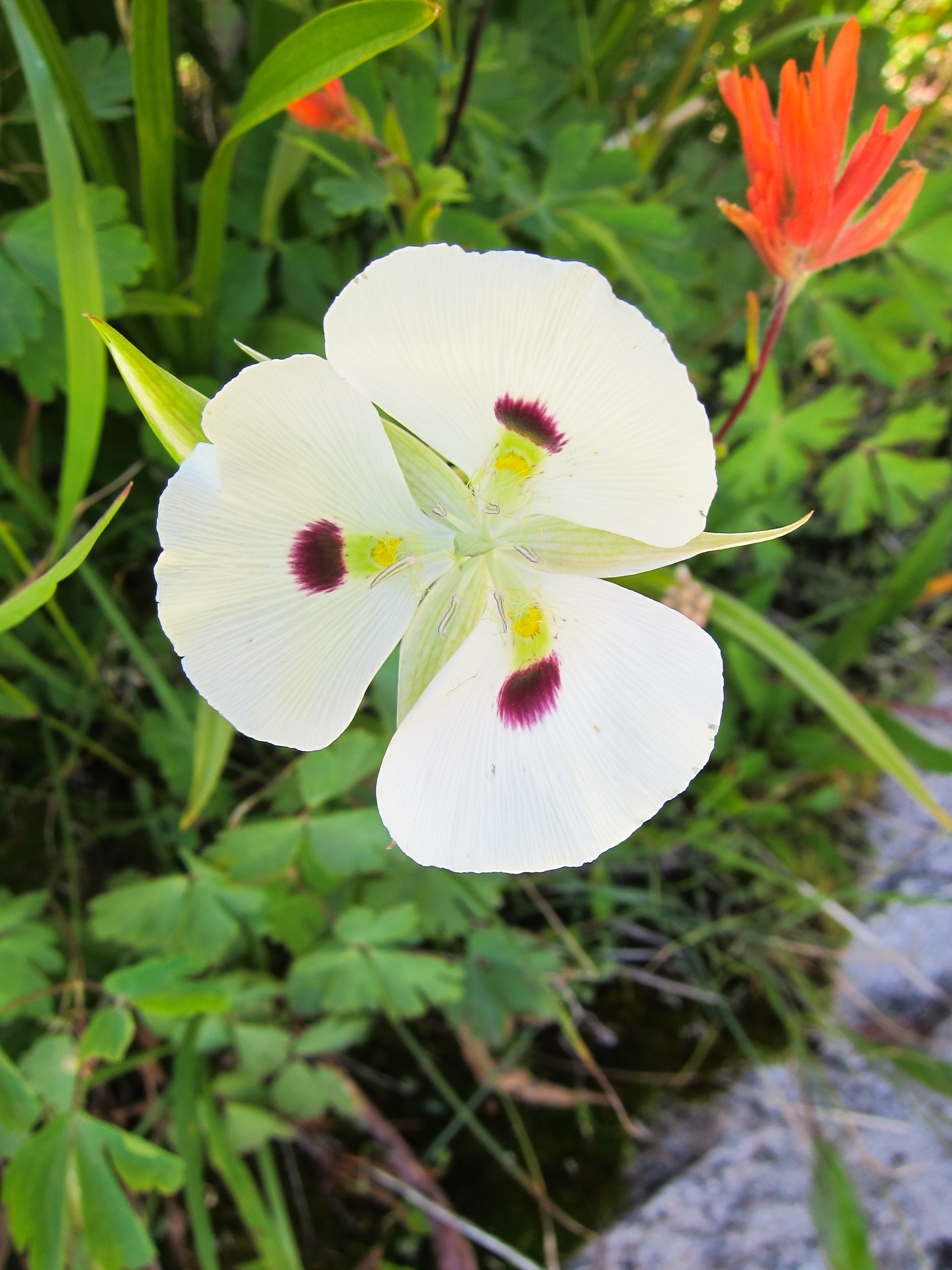
- In Sawtooth Wilderness, Idaho

Scientific classification
- Kingdom: Plantae
- Clade: Tracheophytes
- Clade: Angiosperms
- Clade: Monocots
- Order: Liliales
- Family: Liliaceae
- Genus: Calochortus
- Species: C. eurycarpus

Binomial name
- Calochortus eurycarpus S.Watson

Synonyms
- Calochortus nitidus var. eurycarpus (S.Watson) Hend.; Calochortus parviflorus Nutt. ex Baker; Calochortus euumbellatus A.Nelson; Calochortus umbellatus A.Nelson 1912, illegitimate homonym not Alph. Wood 1868

= Calochortus eurycarpus =

Species of flowering plant

Calochortus eurycarpus (white mariposa lily) is a North American species of flowering plant in the lily family. It is native to the western United States: Montana, Idaho, eastern Oregon, western Wyoming, northeastern Nevada (Box Elder County) and southeastern Washington (Asotin County + Garfield County).

Calochortus eurycarpus is a bulb-forming perennial with straight stems up to 50 cm tall. Flowers are white or pale lavender (or rarely pink) with a conspicuous reddish-purple blotch on the inside of each petal.
