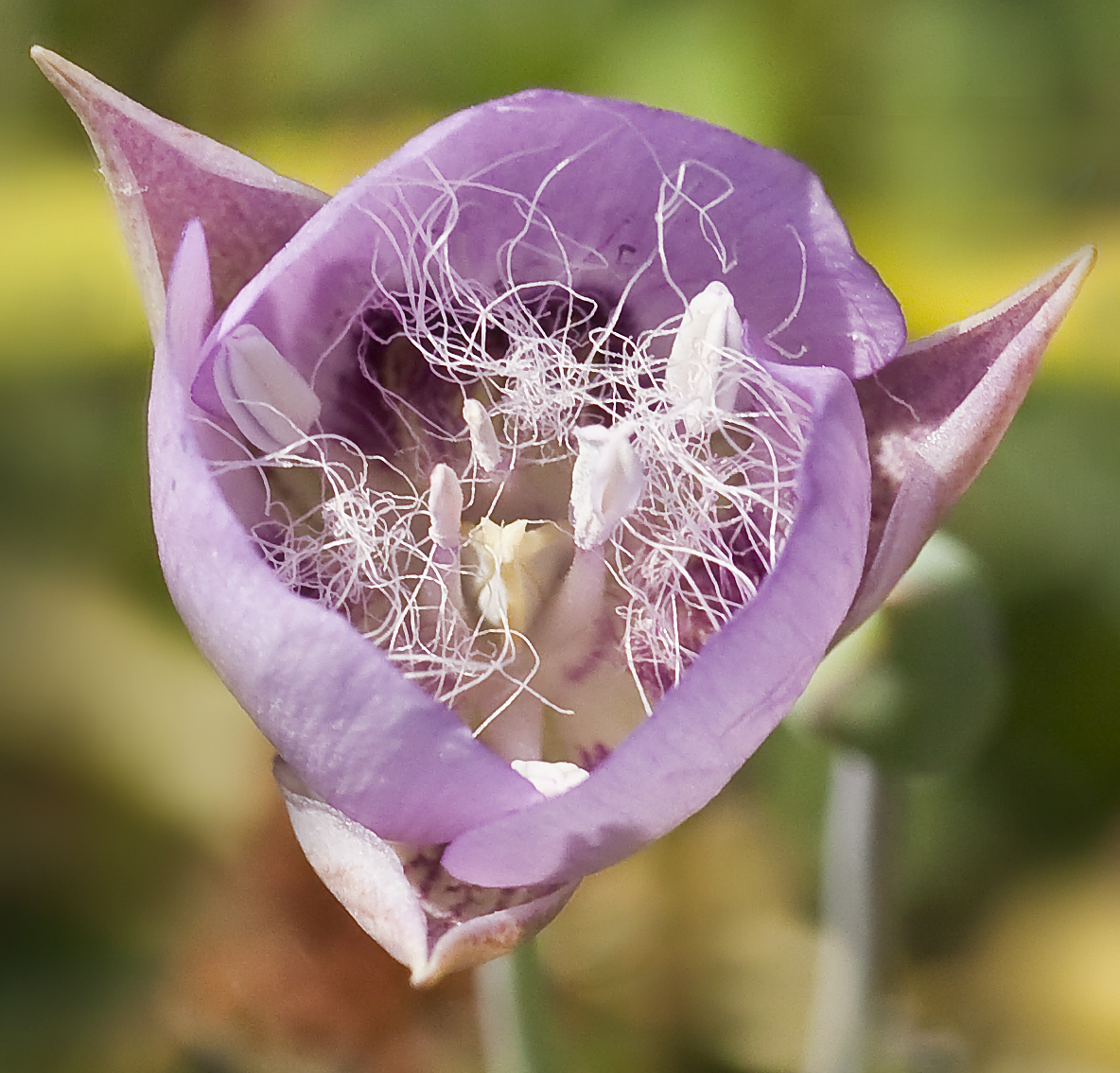

Scientific classification
- Kingdom: Plantae
- Clade: Tracheophytes
- Clade: Angiosperms
- Clade: Monocots
- Order: Liliales
- Family: Liliaceae
- Genus: Calochortus
- Species: C. longibarbatus

Binomial name
- Calochortus longibarbatus S.Wats.

Synonyms
- Calochortus longebarbatus S.Wats., alternate spelling

= Calochortus longibarbatus =

Species of flowering plant

Calochortus longibarbatus is a species of flowering plant in the lily family with the common names long-haired star-tulip and longbeard mariposa lily. It is native to Oregon, Washington, and northern California, where it grows in the forest and woodlands of the mountains.

It is a bulb-producing perennial herb which produces a branching stem up to about 30 centimeters tall. Flowers are upright, bell-shaped, pink to lavender with darker markings on the petals.

Varieties

- Calochortus longibarbatus var. longibarbatus - most of species range
- Calochortus longibarbatus var. peckii Ownbey - Ochoco Mountains in central Oregon
