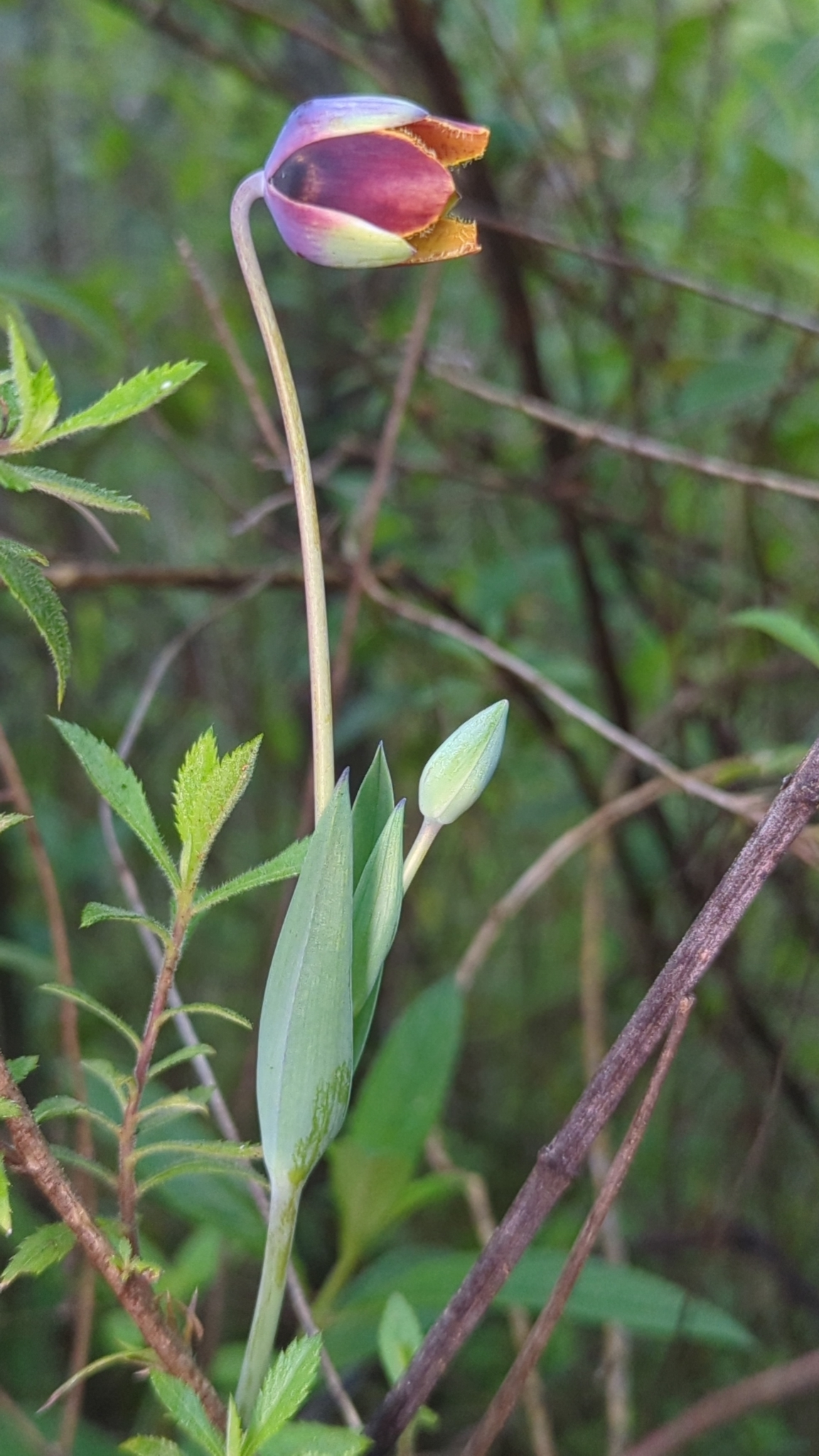
- Tochimilco, Puebla, Mexico, 2022

Scientific classification
- Kingdom: Plantae
- Clade: Tracheophytes
- Clade: Angiosperms
- Clade: Monocots
- Order: Liliales
- Family: Liliaceae
- Genus: Calochortus
- Species: C. cernuus

Binomial name
- Calochortus cernuus Painter

= Calochortus cernuus =

Species of flowering plant

Calochortus cernuus is a rare Mexican species of plants in the lily family. It is found only in the hills surrounding the community of Tepoztlán in the State of Morelos south of Mexico City, northeast of Cuernavaca.

== Description ==
Calochortus cernuus is a bulb-forming herb up to 40 cm tall, usually unbranched. Flowers are nodding (hanging) with dark brown sepals and purple petals.
