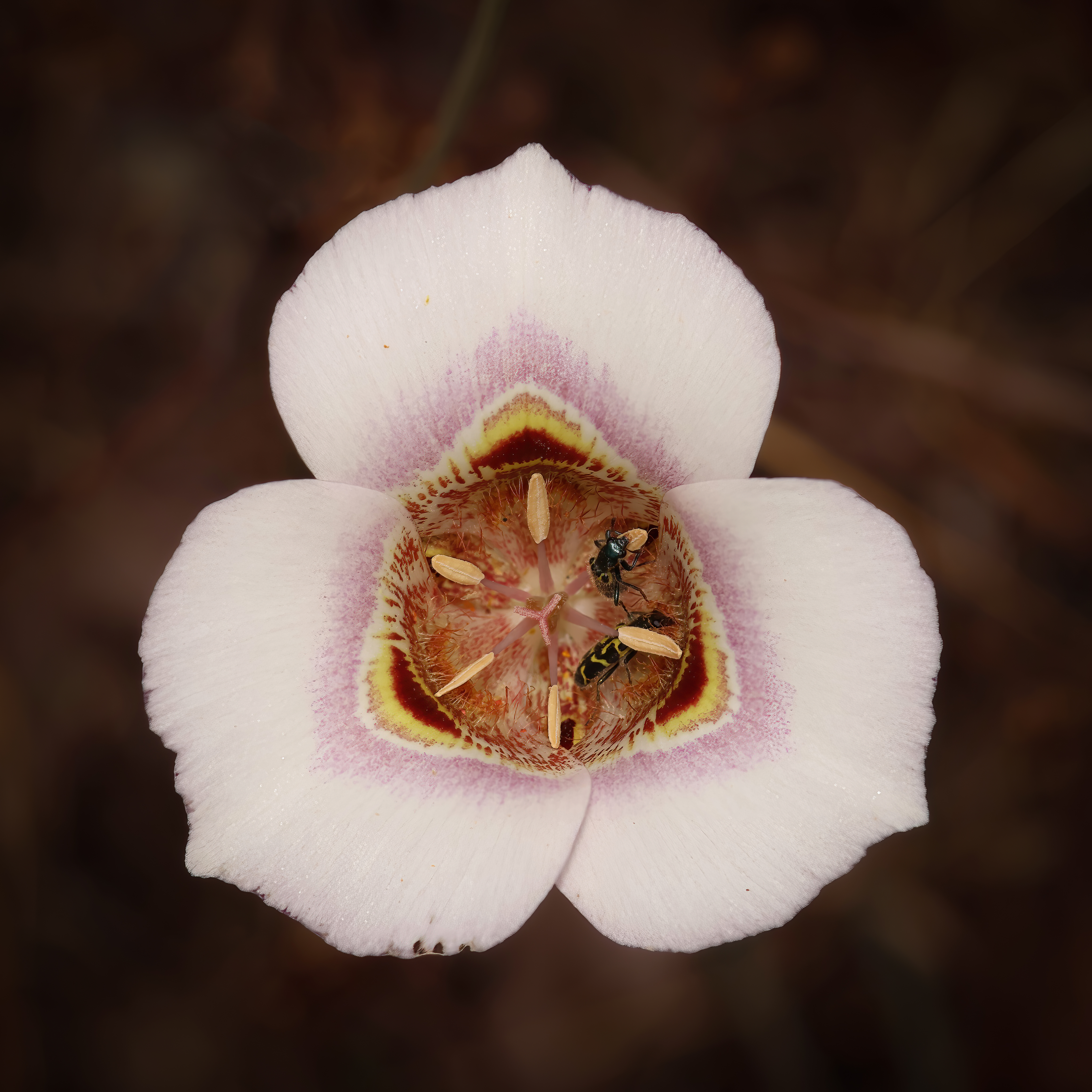

Scientific classification
- Kingdom: Plantae
- Clade: Tracheophytes
- Clade: Angiosperms
- Clade: Monocots
- Order: Liliales
- Family: Liliaceae
- Genus: Calochortus
- Species: C. argillosus

Binomial name
- Calochortus argillosus (Hoover) R. Zebell & P. Fiedler

= Calochortus argillosus =

Species of flowering plant

Calochortus argillosus is a species of flowering plant in the lily family which is known by the common name clay mariposa lily.

It is endemic to coastal central California, where it grows in hard clay soils in the local mountains.

== Description ==
Calochortus argillosus is a perennial herb producing an unbranching stem to heights between 40–60 centimetres (16–24 in). The leaf at the base of the stem is narrow in shape, reaching up to 30 centimetres (12 in) long, and withering away at flowering.

The inflorescence bears 1 to 4 erect bell-shaped flowers. Each flower has three sepals and three petals up to 4 centimeters long. The petals are rounded in shape and white to pink in base color with a central spot or streaking of red, purple, and yellow.

The fruit is a narrow capsule up to 6 centimeters long.
