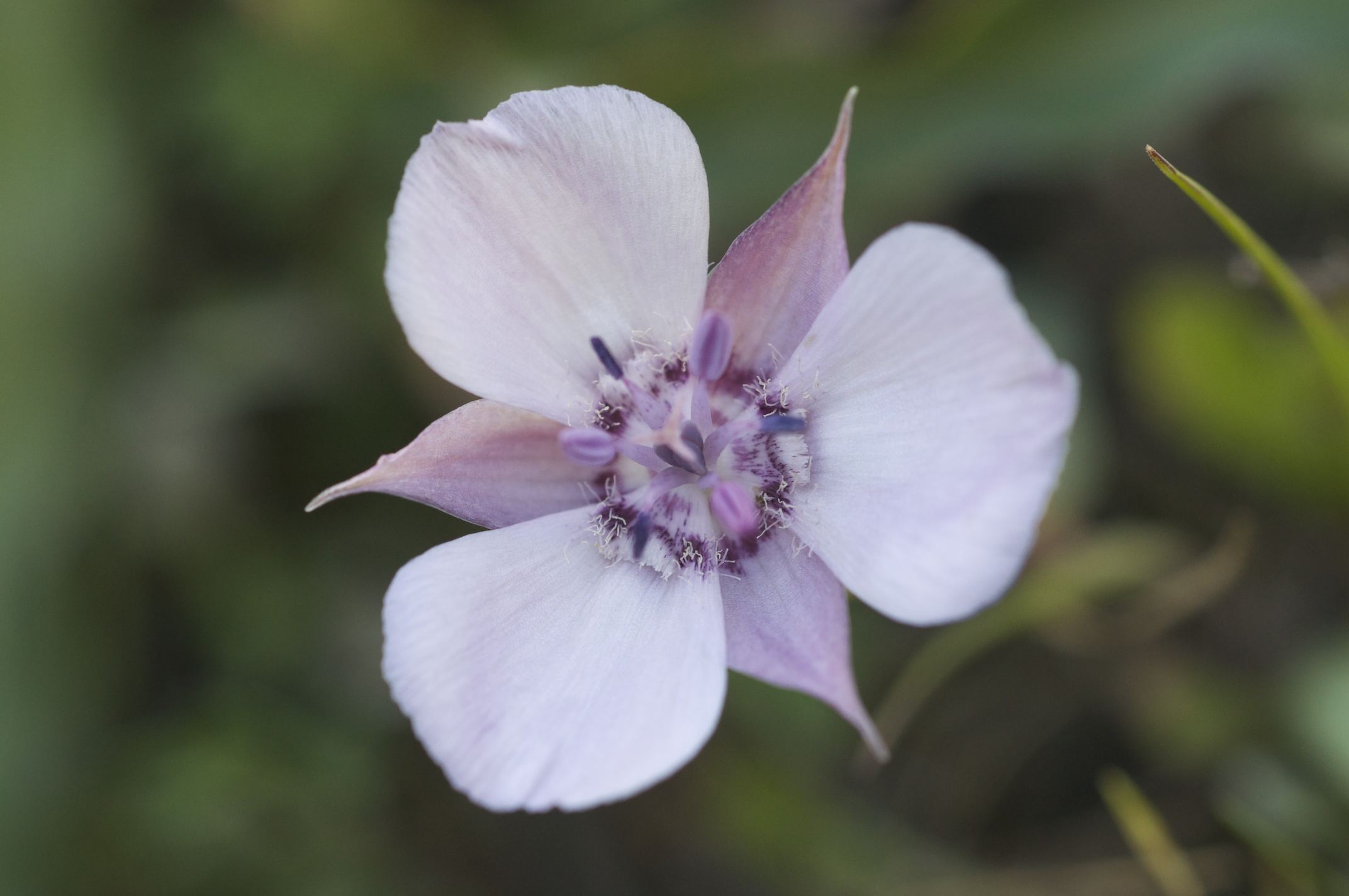

Conservation status
- Apparently Secure (NatureServe)

Scientific classification
- Kingdom: Plantae
- Clade: Tracheophytes
- Clade: Angiosperms
- Clade: Monocots
- Order: Liliales
- Family: Liliaceae
- Genus: Calochortus
- Species: C. umbellatus

Binomial name
- Calochortus umbellatus Alph.Wood 1868 not A. Nelson 1912

Synonyms
- Calochortus collinus Lemmon

= Calochortus umbellatus =

Species of flowering plant

Calochortus umbellatus is a flowering plant in the lily family found only in California in the United States. The common name for this species is Oakland mariposa lily or Oakland star-tulip.

== Distribution ==
The species is a California endemic of limited distribution. It grows primarily in the San Francisco Bay Region, often on serpentine soils, with a few isolated populations in Humboldt, Mendocino, and Nevada Counties.

== Description ==
Calochortus umbellatus is a branching perennial herb up to 25 cm tall. Inflorescence is sub-umbellate with 3-10 white or pale pink flowers.

This species is included on the California Native Plant Society list 4.2 of rare and endangered plants.
