= Calochortus indecorus =

Conservation status
- Presumed Extinct (NatureServe)

Scientific classification
- Kingdom: Plantae
- Clade: Tracheophytes
- Clade: Angiosperms
- Clade: Monocots
- Order: Liliales
- Family: Liliaceae
- Genus: Calochortus
- Species: C. indecorus

Binomial name
- Calochortus indecorus Ownbey & M.Peck

Extinct species of flowering plant

Calochortus indecorus was a species of flowering plant in the lily family known by the common name Sexton Mountain mariposa lily. It was known only from Sexton Mountain in Josephine County, Oregon, in the United States. It is now presumed extinct.

This perennial herb had a thick, unbranched stem up to 22 centimeters long. The inflorescence contained up to 6 bell-shaped lavender flowers. The fruit was a winged capsule up to 2 centimeters long.

The plant's habitat was serpentine mountain slopes.

This plant was only collected once and has not been located since. It may have been made extinct by construction on Interstate 5.
