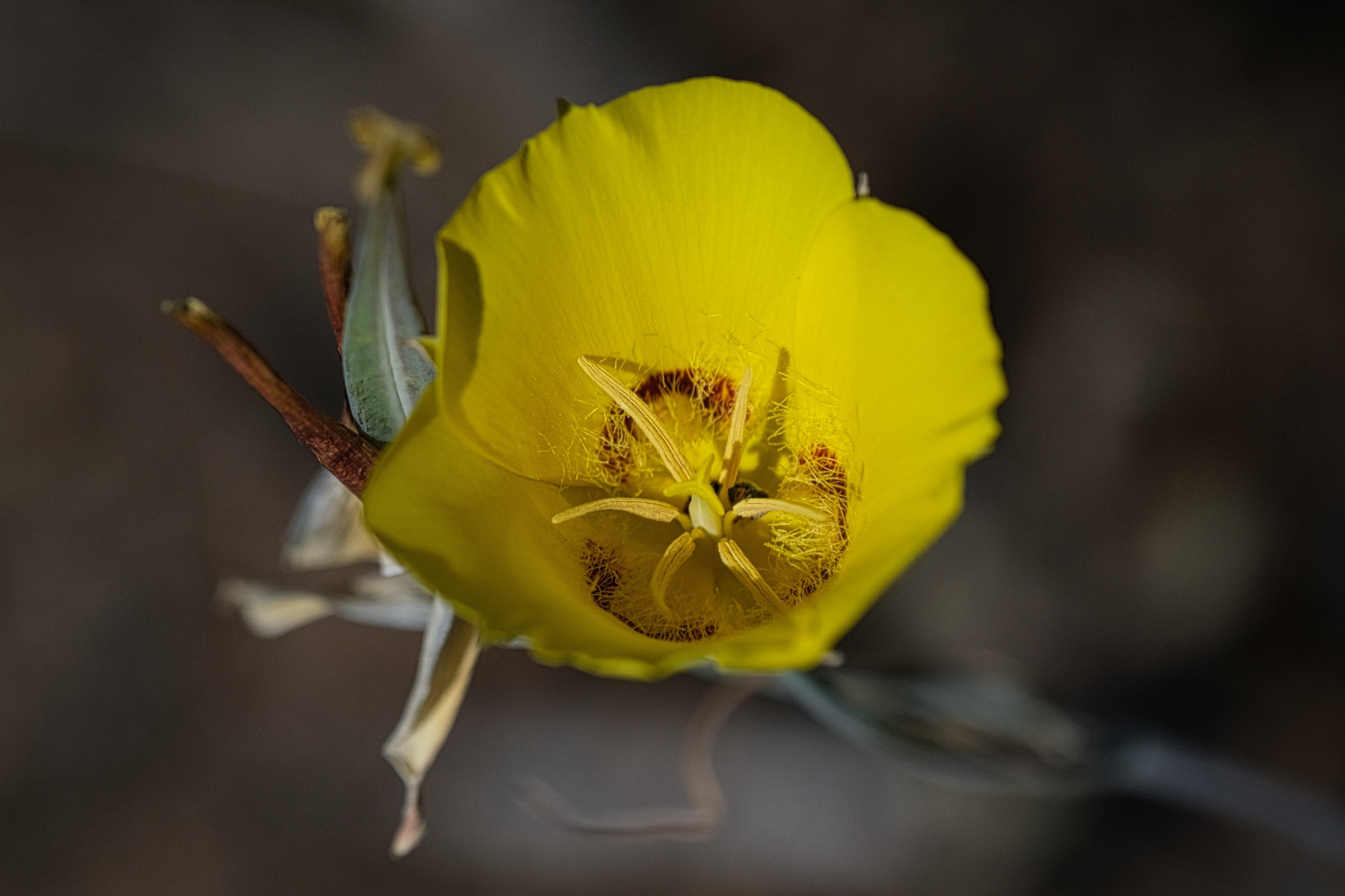

Conservation status
- Vulnerable (NatureServe)

Scientific classification
- Kingdom: Plantae
- Clade: Tracheophytes
- Clade: Angiosperms
- Clade: Monocots
- Order: Liliales
- Family: Liliaceae
- Genus: Calochortus
- Species: C. concolor

Binomial name
- Calochortus concolor (Baker) Purdy

= Calochortus concolor =

Species of flowering plant

Calochortus concolor, also known by the common name goldenbowl mariposa lily, is a species of flowering plant in the lily family.

It is endemic to the Peninsular Ranges, in Southern California (U.S.) and northern Baja California (México). It grows on slopes in chaparral, woodland, and forest habitats.

== Description ==
Calochortus concolor is a perennial herb growing an erect stem 30 to 60 centimeters tall. The waxy basal leaf is 10 to 20 centimeters long and withers at flowering.

The inflorescence bears 1 to 7 erect bell-shaped flowers. Each flower has three sepals and three yellow petals with reddish areas near the bases.

The fruit is a narrow, angled capsule up to 8 centimeters long.
