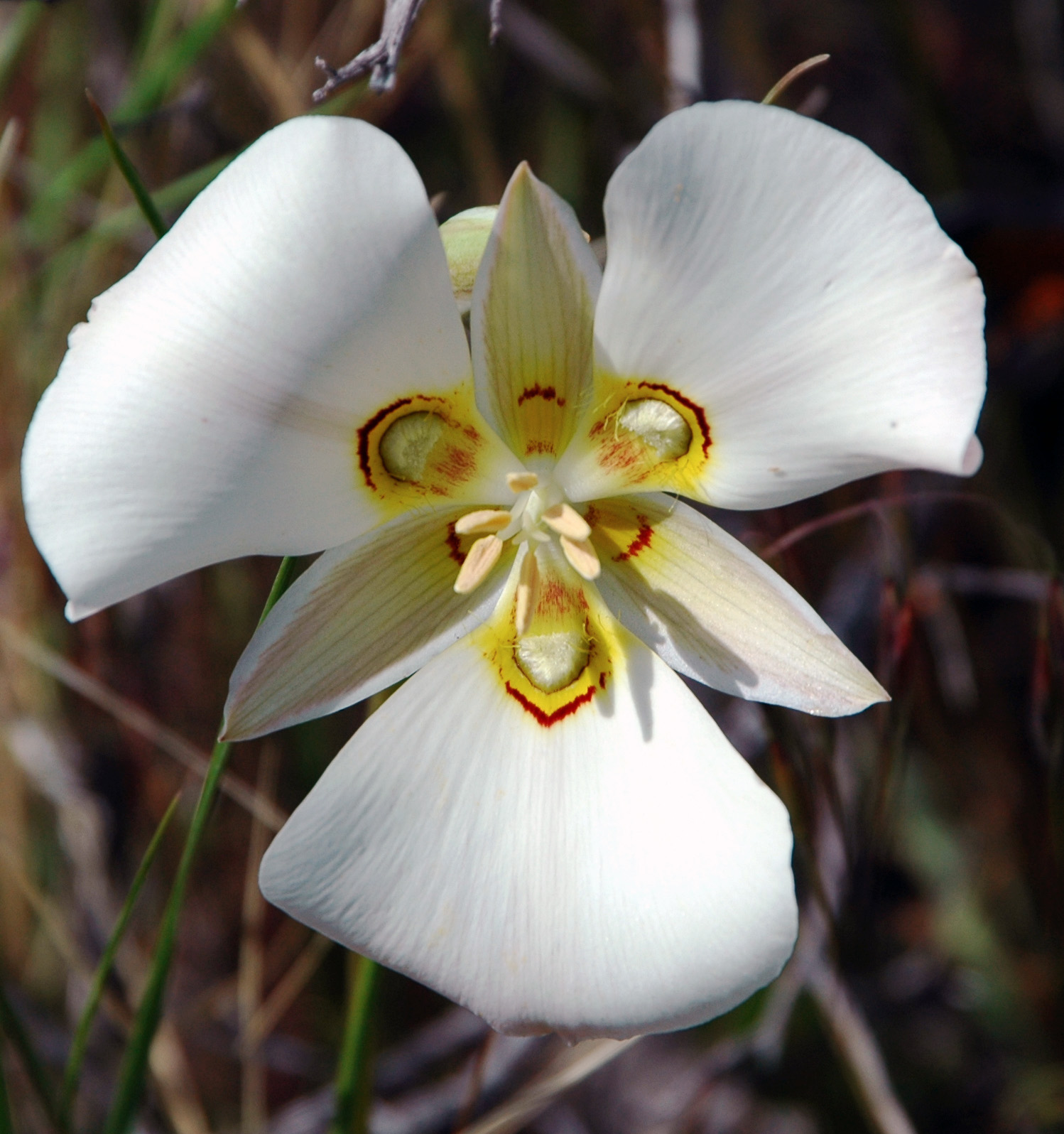
- Sego Lily (Calochortus nuttallii)

Scientific classification
- Kingdom: Plantae
- Clade: Embryophytes
- Clade: Tracheophytes
- Clade: Angiosperms
- Clade: Monocots
- Order: Liliales
- Family: Liliaceae
- Subfamily: Calochortoideae
- Genus: Calochortus; Pursh

Type species
- Calochortus elegans Pursh

Synonyms
- Cyclobothra D.Don; Mariposa (Alph.Wood) Hoover

= Calochortus =

Genus of flowering plants

Calochortus /ˌkæləˈkɔːrtəs, -loʊ-/ is a genus of flowering plants in the lily family. The group includes herbaceous, perennial and bulbous species, all native to North America (primarily the Western United States).

The genus Calochortus includes mariposas (or mariposa lilies) with open wedge-shaped petals, globe lilies and fairy lanterns with globe-shaped flowers, and cat's ears and star tulips with erect pointed petals. The word Calochortus is derived from Greek and means "beautiful grass".

== Description ==
Calochortus stems grow to over 30 centimetres (12 in) tall.

The flowers can be white, yellow, pink, red-orange, or purplish. They are up to 7.5 cm (3 in) wide, with six tepals. Unlike most other Liliaceae, Calochortus tepals are in two series that differ in size and color. The outer three are generally narrower and more sepal-like, while the inner three are larger, usually with bright marks at the base, and are often described as petals. The flowers are borne on a stem that arises from a bulb, generally in the spring or early summer. The insides of the petals are often very 'hairy'. These hairs, along with the nectaries, are often used in distinguishing species from each other.

The group includes herbaceous, perennial, and bulbous species.

== Taxonomy ==
=== History ===
Calochortus was first proposed in 1814 by Frederick Pursh to accommodate a specimen—C. elegans—received from the Lewis and Clark expedition. In the 1800s, several species were added to the genus; however, much mistakes in naming conventions led to confusion and minimal knowledge gained by the end of the century.

In 1940, Francis Marion Ownbey wrote a comprehensive monograph on Calochortus, referencing morphological evidence, geographical distribution, and his own study of cytological material. Ownbey proposed a treatment dividing Calochortus into three sections (later corroborated by J. M. Beal):

1. Eucalochortus
  - Ten basic chromosomes and two known cases of tetraploidy
  - Includes subsections Pulchelli, Eleganti, Nudi, Nitidi
2. Mariposa
  - Basic chromosome numbers between six and nine
  - Includes subsections Venusti, Macrocarpi, Nuttalliani, Gunnisoniani
3. Cyclobothra
  - Nine basic chromosomes
  - Includes subsection Weediani

In 1985, F.N. Rasmussen developed a new treatment splitting Calochortus from Liliaceae, moving it into a separate family—Calochortaceae—based on chromosomal evidence, septicidal fruit, and a Polygonum type embryo sac formation. Rasmussen found that the basic chromosome numbers of Calochortus vary between seven and twenty.

=== Subdivision update ===
In the late 1990s and early 2000s, Thomas B. Patterson and Thomas J. Givnish gathered additional evidence to create a new Calochortus treatment, subdividing it into seven sections and providing reasoning behind Calochortus being separate from Liliaceae. In 1999, Patterson used cpDNA (specifically rbcL and ndhF sequences) isolated from frozen or silica dried leaf tissue to develop a molecular phylogeny, finding that Calochortus should be divided into seven major clades based on geographic location:

- Bay Area
- Pacific Northwest
- San Diego
- Great Basin- Rocky Mountains
- Coast Ranges- Sierra Nevada
- Southwestern California
- Central Mexico

Patterson also determined at the time that concerted convergence and phylogenetic niche conservatism may have confounded the idea that Calochortaceae (Calochortus) and Liliaceae are closely related. In 2002, Patterson and Givnish expanded on these arguments, showing that concerted convergence was demonstrated through independent evolution of characteristics such as bulbs and showy flowers and the distinct differences of these appearing as a result of survival in specific habitats. Regarding phylogenetic niche conservatism, Patterson and Givnish make the argument that this phenomenon is present in the plesiomorphic characteristics of rhizomes, inconspicuous flowers, berries, broad leaves, and reticulate venation.

In 2004, Patterson and Givnish made the shift to lump Calochortus within Liliaceae within their paper per the recommendations of Bremer et al. (2003) and Bremer, Chase, and Stevens (1998). Using similar DNA collection techniques to Patterson (1999), Patterson and Givnish developed a more detailed molecular phylogeny, comparing the seven recently determined sections to Ownbey's original three and finding that Ownbey's Eucalochortus section is monophyletic, Mariposa is paraphyletic, and Cyclobothra is polyphyletic. As a result of their research, Patterson and Givnish (2004) found that the two main factors of Calochortus speciation are:

1. Poor dispersal caused by heavy, passively dispersed seeds
2. Chromosomal evolution allowing different clades to "double up" and radiate sympatrically without hybridizing

=== Serpentine tolerance ===
Within Calochortus, almost one-third of species are characterized by ultramafic (form serpentine soils) habitat preferences or specific edaphic requirements, with several being endemic to their environments. Thus, scientists have used serpentine tolerance in understanding evolutionary relationships within the genus. For instance, Patterson and Givnish (2004) created a serpentine tolerance phylogeny. 18 serpentine tolerant species were found (classified by occurring in whole or in part on serpentine soils) and the largest presence of tolerance was found in the Bay Area and Pacific Northwest clades—areas with unusually high numbers of serpentine rocks at the Earth's surface. In addition, Patterson and Givnish (2004) found that 11 out of 18 species displayed only two origins of serpentine tolerance in evolutionary history.

=== Species ===
The genus contains the following species:

Image	Scientific name	Subspecies	Distribution
	Calochortus albus white globelily		CA, Baja California
	Calochortus amabilis Diogenes' lantern		CA
	Calochortus ambiguus doubting mariposa lily		UT AZ NM Sonora
	Calochortus amoenus purple globelily		CA
	Calochortus apiculatus pointed-tip mariposa lily		British Columbia, Alberta, WA OR ID MT WY
	Calochortus argillosus		CA
	Calochortus aureus golden mariposa lily		UT CO AZ NM
	Calochortus balsensis		Oaxaca, Guerrero
	Calochortus barbatus yellow globe lily		from Chihuahua to Oaxaca
	Calochortus bruneaunis Bruneau mariposa lily		CA OR NV UT ID MT
	Calochortus catalinae Santa Catalina mariposa lily — (threatened by development)		CA
	Calochortus cernuus		Morelos
	Calochortus ciscoensis		UT
	Calochortus clavatus club-hair mariposa lily	Calochortus clavatus var. avius -rare, Calochortus clavatus var. gracilis; Calochortus clavatus ssp. clavatus; Calochortus clavatus ssp. pallidus; Calochortus clavatus ssp. recurvifolius — rare	CA
	Calochortus coeruleus beavertail grass		CA
	Calochortus concolor golden-bowl mariposa lily		CA, Baja California
	Calochortus coxii Cox's mariposa lily		OR
	Calochortus dunnii Dunn's mariposa lily — rare		CA, Baja California
	Calochortus elegans northwestern mariposa lily; star tulip	Calochortus elegans var. elegans elegant mariposa lily; Calochortus elegans var. nanus; Calochortus elegans var. oreophilus elegant mariposa lily; Calochortus elegans var. selwayensis Selway mariposa lily	CA OR WA ID MT
	Calochortus eurycarpus white mariposa lily		OR WA NV ID MT WY
	Calochortus excavatus Inyo mariposa lily		(threatened by groundwater development) - CA
	Calochortus exilis		Hidalgo
	Calochortus fimbriatus late-blooming mariposa lily — rare		CA
	Calochortus flexuosus winding mariposa lily		CA NV UT CO AZ NM Baja California, Sonora
	Calochortus foliosus		Michoacán
	Calochortus fuscus		Mexico
	Calochortus greenei Green's mariposa lily — rare		CA OR
	Calochortus ghiesbreghtii		Mexico, Guatemala
	Calochortus gunnisonii Gunnison's mariposa lily	Calochortus gunnisonii var. gunnisonii; Calochortus gunnisonii var. perpulcher	ID MT WY SD NE CO UT AZ NM
	Calochortus hartwegii		Aguascalientes, Nayarit, Jalisco
	Calochortus howellii Howell's mariposa lily		OR
	†Calochortus indecorus Sexton Mountain mariposa lily		OR - extinct
	Calochortus invenustus plain mariposa lily		CA NV
	Calochortus kennedyi desert mariposa lily	Calochortus kennedyi var. kennedyi; Calochortus kennedyi var. munzii	CA NV AZ Sonora, Chihuahua
	Calochortus leichtlinii smokey mariposa		CA NV OR
	Calochortus longibarbatus longbeard mariposa lily	Calochortus longibarbatus var. longibarbatus — (threatened by grazing); Calochortus longibarbatus var. peckii	CA OR WA
	Calochortus luteus yellow mariposa lily		CA
	Calochortus lyallii Lyall's mariposa lily		WA, British Columbia
	Calochortus macrocarpus sagebrush mariposa lily	Calochortus macrocarpus var. macrocarpus; Calochortus macrocarpus var. maculosus Nez Perce mariposa lily	CA NV OR WA ID MT, British Columbia
	Calochortus marcellae		Nuevo León, Coahuila, Tamaulipas
	Calochortus mendozae		Querétaro, San Luis Potosí
	Calochortus minimus Sierran mariposa lily		CA
	†Calochortus monanthus Shasta River mariposa lily		CA (presumed extinct)
	Calochortus monophyllus yellow startulip		CA OR
	Calochortus nigrescens		Oaxaca
	Calochortus nitidus broad-fruit mariposa lily		WA OR ID
	Calochortus nudus naked mariposa lily		CA OR
	Calochortus nuttallii sego lily, (state flower of Utah)		ND SD NE MT ID CO UT NV AZ NM
	Calochortus obispoensis San Luis mariposa lily		CA
	Calochortus palmeri Palmer's mariposa lily	Calochortus palmeri var. munzii Munz's mariposa lily; Calochortus palmeri var. palmeri — rare	CA
	Calochortus panamintensis Panamint Mountain mariposa lily — rare		CA NV
	Calochortus persistens Siskiyou mariposa lily — rare		CA OR
	Calochortus plummerae Plummer's mariposa lily — rare		CA
	Calochortus pringlei		Morelos, Puebla, Jalisco, Oaxaca
	Calochortus pulchellus Mount Diablo globelily		CA
	Calochortus raichei Cedars mariposa lily		CA
	Calochortus simulans San Luis Obispo mariposa lily		CA
	Calochortus spatulatus		Mexico
	Calochortus splendens splendid mariposa lily		CA, Baja California
	Calochortus striatus alkali mariposa lily		CA NV
	Calochortus subalpinus subalpine mariposa lily, Cascade mariposa lily, cat's ear lily		WA OR
	Calochortus superbus superb mariposa		CA
	Calochortus syntrophus Callahan's mariposa lily		CA
	Calochortus tiburonensis Tiburon mariposa		CA
	Calochortus tolmiei Tolmie's star-tulip, hairy pussy ears		CA OR WA
	Calochortus umbellatus Oakland mariposa lily		CA
	Calochortus umpquaensis Umpqua mariposa lily		OR
	Calochortus uniflorus mariposa 'Cupido'		CA OR
	Calochortus venustulus		Mexico
	Calochortus venustus butterfly mariposa, white mariposa		CA
	Calochortus vestae Vesta's mariposa, Coast Range mariposa		CA
	Calochortus weedii Weed's mariposa		CA, Baja Calilfornia
	Calochortus westonii Shirley Meadow star-tulip, Weston's mariposa		CA

=== Etymology ===
The word Calochortus is derived from Greek and means "beautiful grass".

== Distribution and habitat ==
Calochortus includes approximately 70 species distributed from southwestern British Columbia, through California and Mexico, to northern Guatemala and eastwards to New Mexico, Nebraska and the Dakotas. Calochortus is the most widely dispersed genus of Liliaceae on the North American Pacific Coast. Of these, 28 species are endemic to California.

The plants grow in open areas in partial shade over a wide range of elevations. T. B. Patterson's phylogenetic analysis indicated highly localized speciation, with different floral syndromes being strongly linked to specific habitats, as follows:

- Mariposas: dry grasslands, open chaparral, semideserts
- Star-tulips: wet meadows
- Cat's ears: montane woodlands
- Fairy lanterns: oak woodlands, closed forests.

== Uses ==
=== Culinary ===
The bulbs of many species were eaten by Native Americans, being eaten raw or gathered in the fall and boiled. The flower buds were eaten young and fresh. They were eaten by Mormon settlers, especially in 1848 as a famine food when their cultivated crops were attacked by crickets. The bulbs are a starchy food source similar to a potato tuber.

Some Native Americans called Calochortus "sego". They used it as food, in ceremonies and as a traditional medicinal plant.

=== Cultivation ===
Some Calochortus species are cultivated as ornamental plants by specialty nurseries and botanic gardens to sell. The bulbs are planted for their flowers, in traditional, native plant, and wildlife gardens; in rock gardens; and in potted container gardens for those needing unwatered Summer dormancy.

== See also ==
- List of plants known as lily

== Notes ==
=== References ===
- "Calochortus". Integrated Taxonomic Information System.
- Treatment from the Jepson Manual (TJM93)
- Gerritsen, Mary E and Parsons, R. Calochortus. Mariposa Lilies and Their Relatives. Timber Press, 2007.
- Pacific Bulb Society
