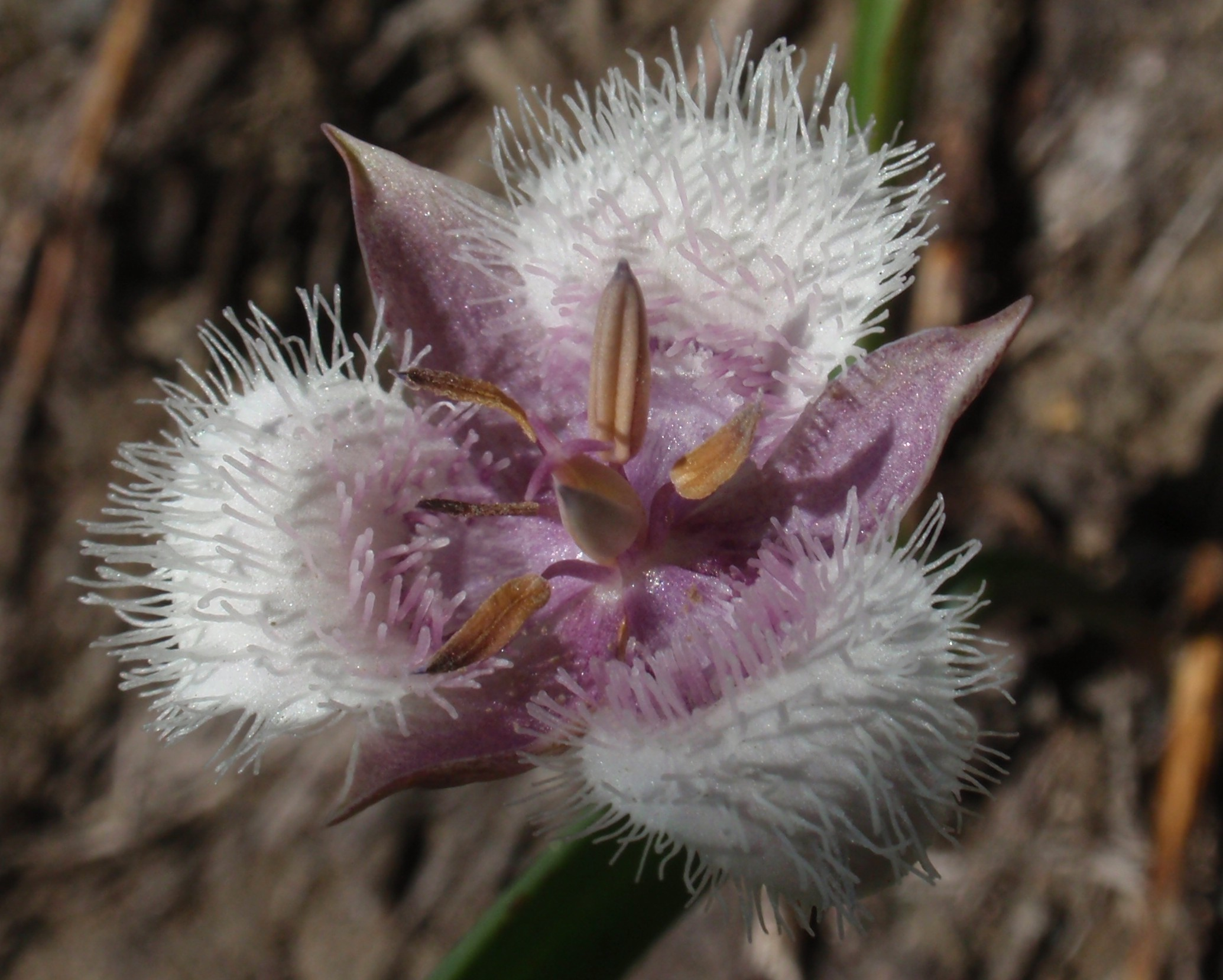

Conservation status
- Vulnerable (NatureServe)

Scientific classification
- Kingdom: Plantae
- Clade: Tracheophytes
- Clade: Angiosperms
- Clade: Monocots
- Order: Liliales
- Family: Liliaceae
- Genus: Calochortus
- Species: C. coeruleus

Binomial name
- Calochortus coeruleus (Kellogg) S.Wats.

Synonyms
- Calochortus caeruleus common misspelling; Cyclobothra coerulea Kellogg; Cyclobothra elegans Torr.; Calochortus maweanus Leichtlin ex Baker; Cyclobothra maweama (Leichtlin ex Baker) Tubergen; Calochortus coeruleus var. maweanus (Leichtlin ex Baker) Jeps.; Calochortus coeruleus var. fimbriatus Ownbey

= Calochortus coeruleus =

Species of flowering plant

Calochortus coeruleus, often misspelled as Calochortus caeruleus, is a bulbous plant of the lily family. It is known by the common name beavertail grass or blue star tulip.

== Description ==
The plant is endemic to California. It is found only in the North California Coast Ranges, Southern Cascade Range, and Northern Sierra Nevada.

Calochortus coeruleus is a distinctive plant bearing flowers with light blue spade-shaped petals covered in brushlike hairs.

=== Taxonomy ===
The botanical name Calochortus caeruleus is not accepted, being an orthographic variant (misspelling) of Calochortus coeruleus. Watson in coining the name in 1875 spelled it "caeruleus" but he also cited Kellogg's 1863 name Cyclobothra coerulea as basionym.
