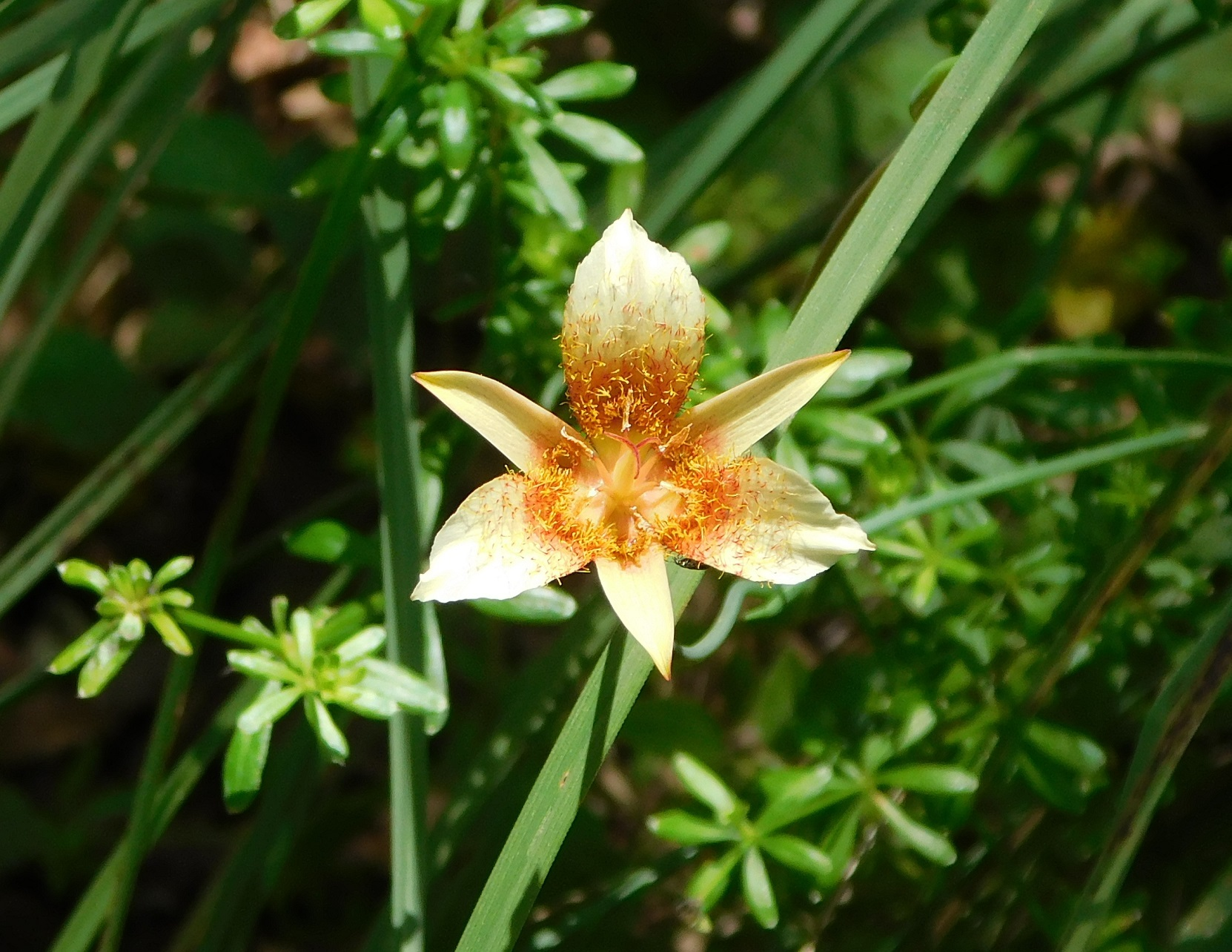

Scientific classification
- Kingdom: Plantae
- Clade: Tracheophytes
- Clade: Angiosperms
- Clade: Monocots
- Order: Liliales
- Family: Liliaceae
- Genus: Calochortus
- Species: C. ghiesbreghtii

Binomial name
- Calochortus ghiesbreghtii S.Wats.

= Calochortus ghiesbreghtii =

Species of flowering plant

Calochortus ghiesbreghtii is a Mesoamerican species of plants in the lily family. It is native to Guatemala and to the States of Hidalgo and Chiapas in Mexico.

== Description ==
Calochortus ghiesbreghtii is a bulb-forming perennial herb. Flowers are upright, white to pale purple, sometimes with hairy glands near the base of the petals.
