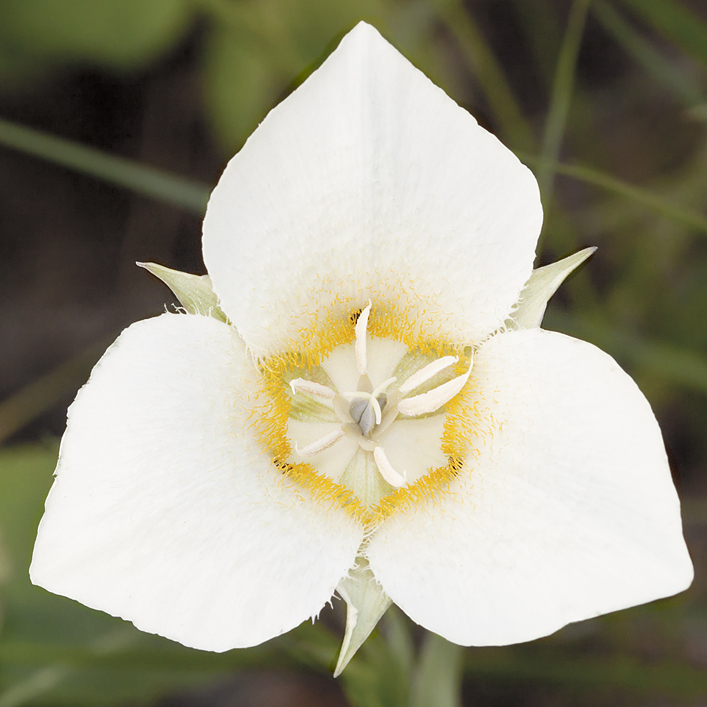
- Two Medicine Lake in Glacier National Park, Montana

Scientific classification
- Kingdom: Plantae
- Clade: Embryophytes
- Clade: Tracheophytes
- Clade: Spermatophytes
- Clade: Angiosperms
- Clade: Monocots
- Order: Liliales
- Family: Liliaceae
- Genus: Calochortus
- Species: C. apiculatus

Binomial name
- Calochortus apiculatus Baker

= Calochortus apiculatus =

Species of flowering plant

Calochortus apiculatus is a North American species of flowering plants in the lily family.

== Distribution ==
Calochortus apiculatus is native to western Canada (Alberta and British Columbia) and the northwestern United States. Most of the US specimens are from the northern Rocky Mountains of Idaho, Montana, and Washington, but there are reports of isolated populations in the Black Hills of Crook County, Wyoming.

== Description ==
Calochortus apiculatus is a bulb-forming perennial herb producing a single stalk up to 30 cm tall. Flowers are pale yellow with purple streaks and yellow hairs on the petals.
