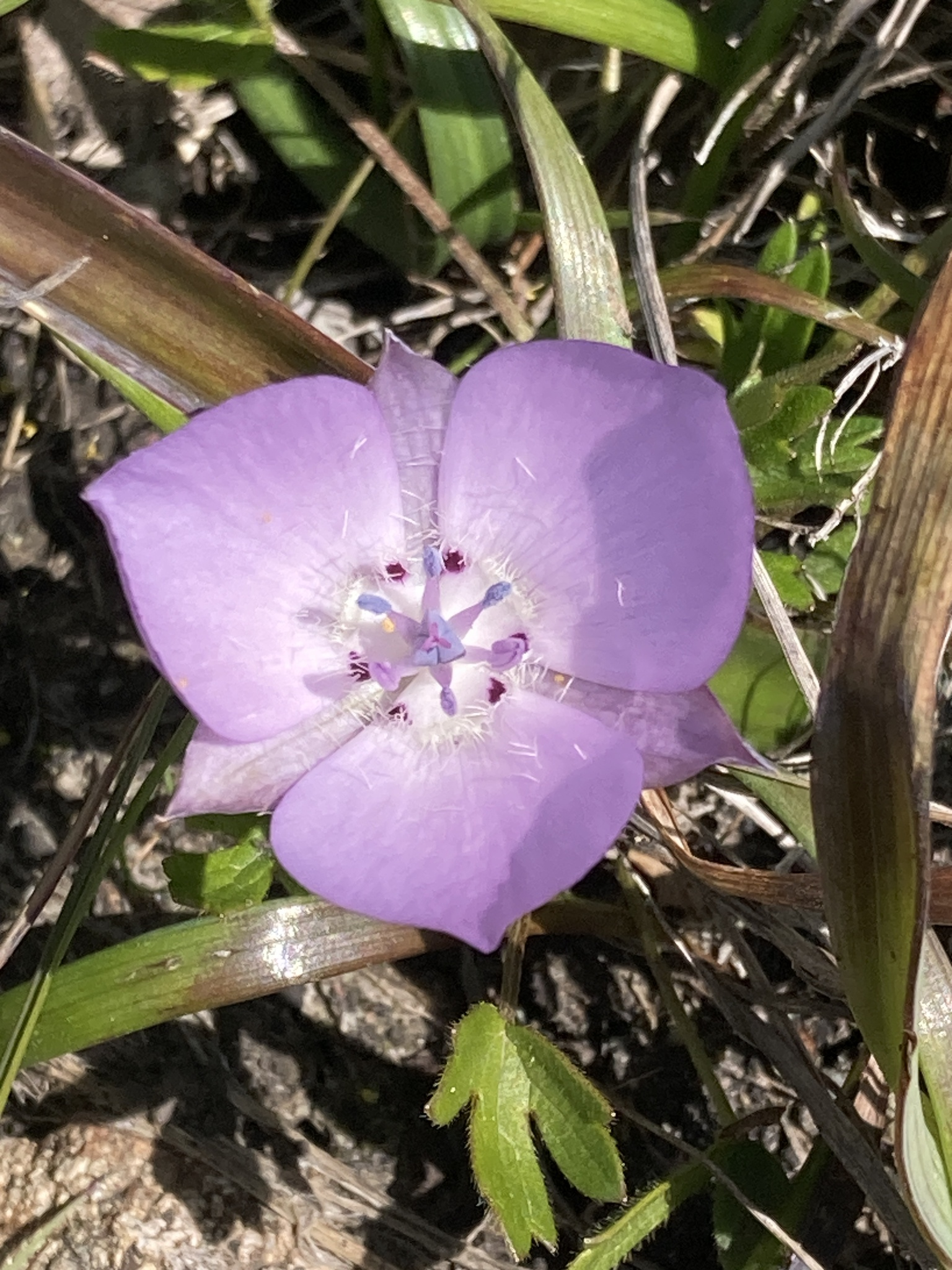

Scientific classification
- Kingdom: Plantae
- Clade: Tracheophytes
- Clade: Angiosperms
- Clade: Monocots
- Order: Liliales
- Family: Liliaceae
- Genus: Calochortus
- Species: C. uniflorus

Binomial name
- Calochortus uniflorus Hook. & Arn. 1840 not Hook. f. 1869

Synonyms
- Cyclobothra uniflora (Hook. & Arn.) Kunth; Calochortus lilacinus Kellogg; Calochortus uniflorus Hook.f.

= Calochortus uniflorus =

Species of flowering plant

Calochortus uniflorus is a species of flowering plant in the lily family known by the common names Monterey mariposa lily and large-flowered star-tulip. It is native to western Oregon and to California as far south as San Luis Obispo County. It grows in moist areas, such as meadows, in coastal hills and lower-elevation mountains. Most of the populations are found in the Coast Ranges, but some occur in the Cascades and in the Klamath Mountains.

Calochortus uniflorus is a perennial herb producing a short, unbranching stem typically less than 5 centimeters tall. The basal leaf is up to 40 centimeters long and does not wither by flowering; there may be one or more shorter leaves higher up the stem. The inflorescence is a loose cluster of 1 to 5 upright, bell-shaped flowers. Each flower has three petals up to about 3 centimeters long and three shorter sepals beneath. The petals are white to pink and may have purple spotting near the bases. The fruit is a capsule up to 2.5 centimeters long.
