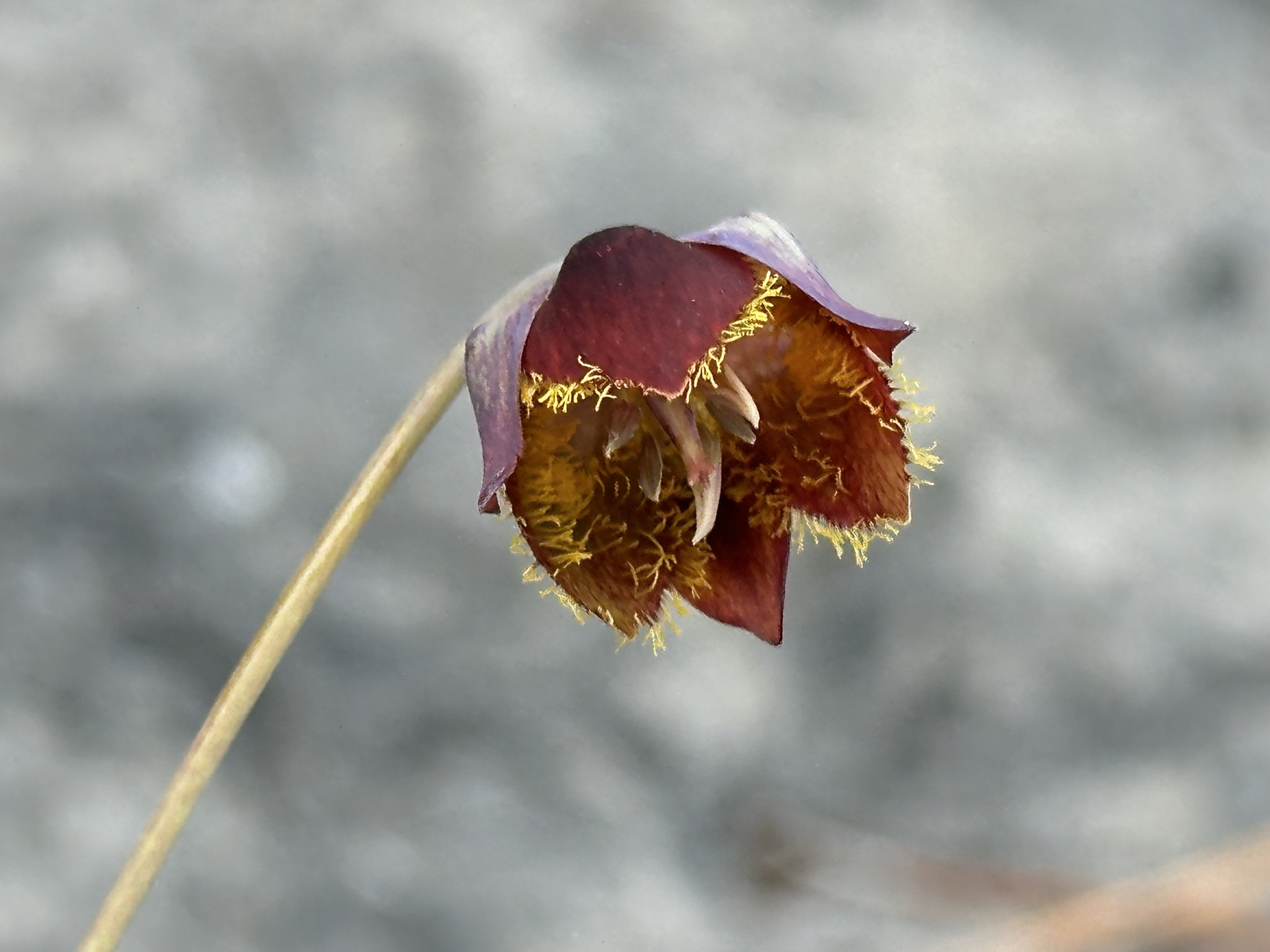
- Flower in Gran Sierra Plegada, Miquihuana, Tamaulipas

Scientific classification
- Kingdom: Plantae
- Clade: Tracheophytes
- Clade: Angiosperms
- Clade: Monocots
- Order: Liliales
- Family: Liliaceae
- Genus: Calochortus
- Species: C. marcellae

Binomial name
- Calochortus marcellae G.L.Nesom

= Calochortus marcellae =

Plant species in the lily family

Calochortus marcellae is a species of mariposa lily from northeastern Mexico.

== Description ==
Calochortus marcellae is a perennial herbaceous plant that grows from an underground bulb. When blooming it grows flowering slender stems that are 25–48 centimeters (10–19 in) tall. The bulb is egg shaped with a thick, fibrous coat with a net-like surface.

The basal leaves are similar in height to the flowering stems and around 6 millimeters in width. The leaves attached to the stems and the floral bracts usually have bulbils in the angle where they join the stem.

Each plant will have one to three flowers on pedicels, individual stems off the main stem, 2.8 to 8.5 cm (1.1–3.3 in) long. The flowers are halfway between being bell and saucer shaped and dangle from the stems facing downward. They are hairless outside, but inside they are filled with bright yellow hairs. Each flower has three petals and three petal-like sepals, usually with the outside of the petals and sepals being slightly different colors. Each of the petal are small, just 4.5–8 millimeters wide and 11.5–16 mm long fringed with hairs and dark carmine red. The sepals are similar sized, 3.5–6 mm wide and 10–15 mm long, but usually purplish-red with a glaucous outside. Both sepals and petals can be yellowish inside at times.

== Taxonomy ==
The botanist Guy L. Nesom scientifically described and named Calochortus marcellae in 1983, placing it in the Calochortus genus as part of the Liliaceae family. The species has no botanical synonyms or varieties. It is part of a group of 13 Calochortus species from central Mexico within what Ownbey called section Cyclobothra. However, this genetic analysis in the early 2000s indicated the section to be polyphyletic.

The type specimen was collected 2.5 kilometers east-northeast of San Antonio de Peña Nevada in an area of gypsum outcrops in early August 1981. The species was previously collected by Ernest Reeves Sohns on 1 Ocotober 1954 near Aguaje de Garcia in the Sierra de Guadalcazar. Nesom wrote of the naming of the species, "The new species is named for my wife, also a redhead, who assisted in making the 1981 collections of gypsophytes." It is known by the common name Marcella's cyclobothra.

== Range and habitat ==
Calochortus marcellae grows in four states in the northeast of Mexico, Coahuila, Nuevo León, San Luis Potosí, and Tamaulipas. There it grows in northern parts of the Sierra Madre Oriental. In the northern parts of its range it grows in areas with somewhat more moisture, such as along the edges of intermittent creeks, mountain meadows, or in coniferous forests. In the southern parts of its range there is more rainfall and the species grows in relatively dry locations in the lower mountains.
