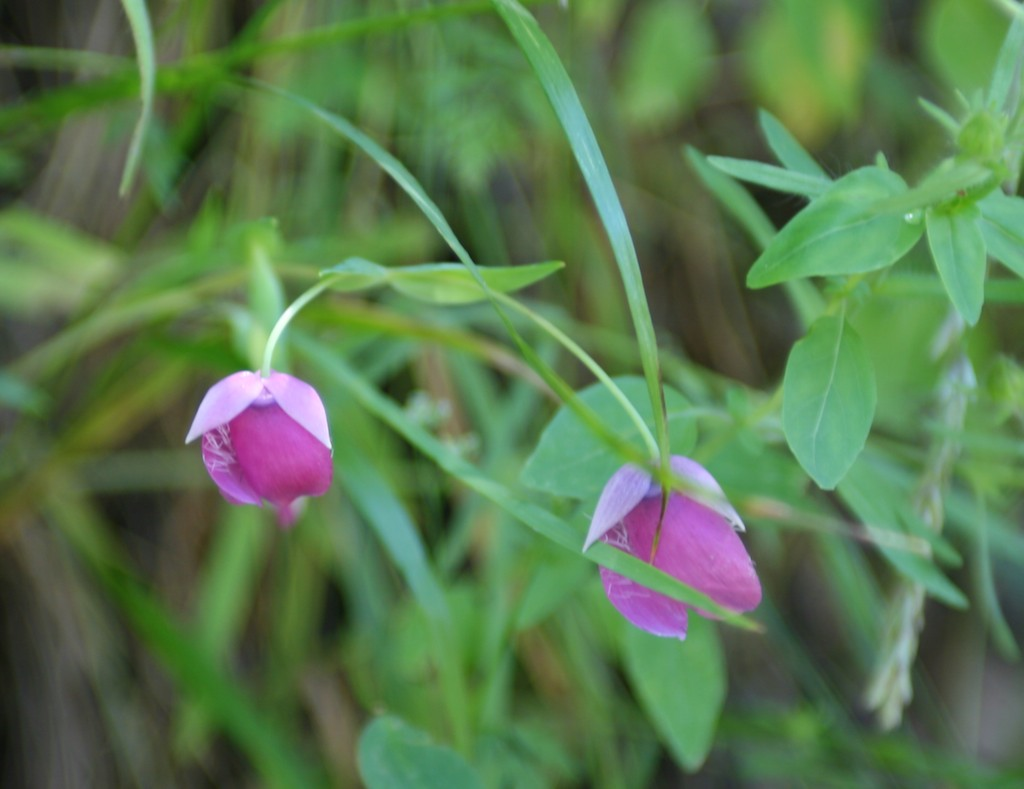

Conservation status
- Vulnerable (NatureServe)

Scientific classification
- Kingdom: Plantae
- Clade: Tracheophytes
- Clade: Angiosperms
- Clade: Monocots
- Order: Liliales
- Family: Liliaceae
- Genus: Calochortus
- Species: C. amoenus

Binomial name
- Calochortus amoenus Greene

= Calochortus amoenus =

Species of flowering plant

Calochortus amoenus is a species of flowering plant in the lily family which is commonly known as purple fairy-lantern.

== Description ==
Calochortus amoenus is a perennial herb producing a branching stem to heights between 20 and 50 centimeters. The leaf at the base of the stem is narrow in shape, reaching up to 50 centimeters long and not withering away at flowering. There are two or three smaller leaves along the stem.

The inflorescence bears two or more nodding flowers, each with its petals curved closed into a spherical shape. Each flower has rose-colored sepals and petals, the petals fringed and lined with long, pink whiskery hairs. The fruit is a winged capsule 2 or 3 centimeters long containing dark brown seeds.

== Distribution and habitat ==
The plant is endemic to California, in the Central Sierra Nevada foothills. It is found on grassy slopes in partial shade of California oak woodland and Yellow Pine Forest habitats, at 500–1,500 metres (1,600–4,900 ft) in elevation.
