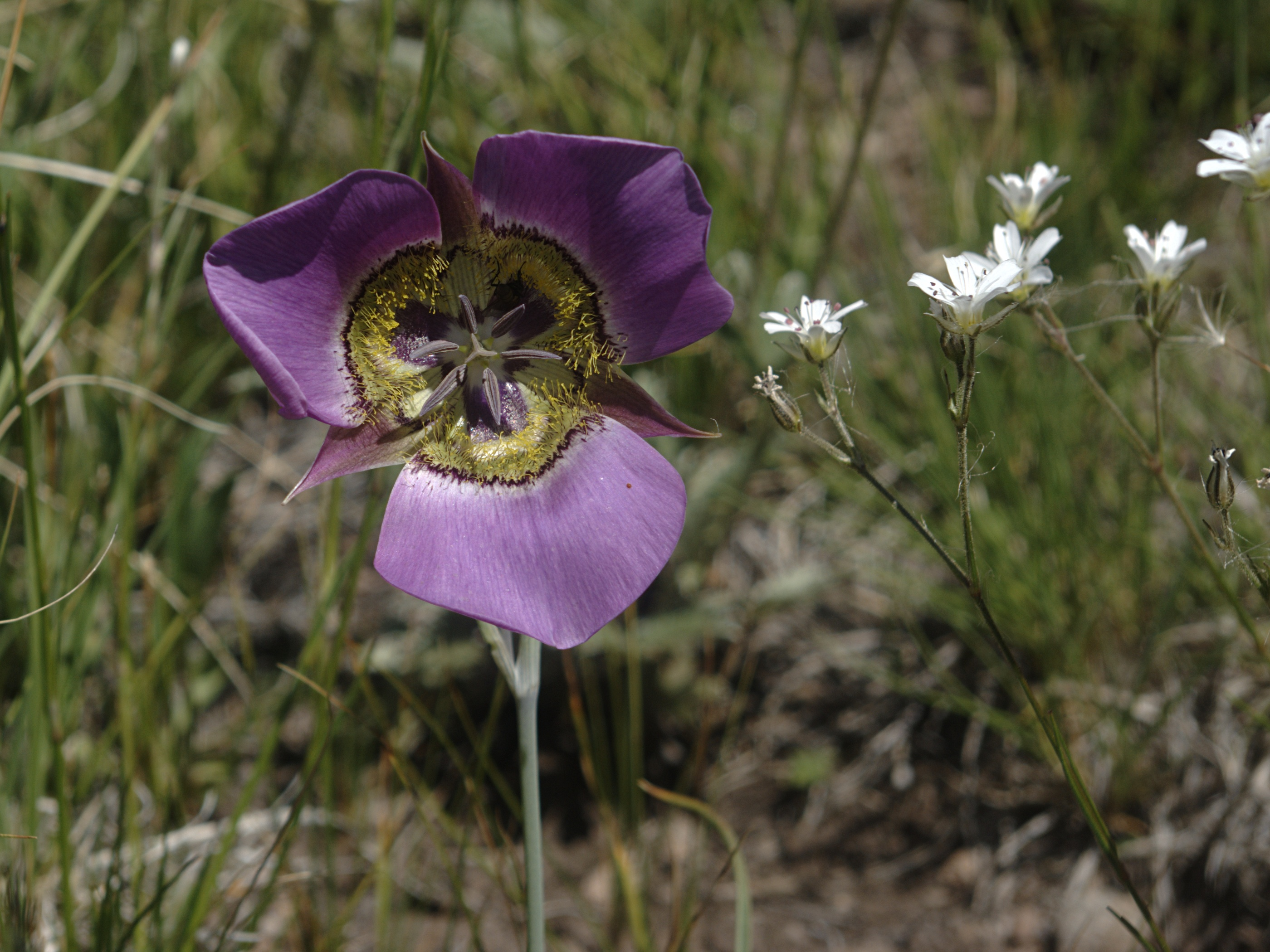
- Calochortus gunnisonii var. gunnisonii Santa Fe National Forest, New Mexico

Conservation status
- Secure (NatureServe)

Scientific classification
- Kingdom: Plantae
- Clade: Tracheophytes
- Clade: Angiosperms
- Clade: Monocots
- Order: Liliales
- Family: Liliaceae
- Genus: Calochortus
- Species: C. gunnisonii

Binomial name
- Calochortus gunnisonii S.Watson

Synonyms
- Synonymy: Calochortus gunnisoni S.Watson; Calochortus gunnisonii var. krelagei Regel; Calochortus gunnisonii var. kreglagii Regel; Calochortus krelagei (Regel) Ortgies; Calochortus gunnisonii var. immaculatus Cockerell; Calochortus gunnisonii var. maculatus Cockerell; Calochortus gunnisonii var. purus Cockerell

= Calochortus gunnisonii =

Species of flowering plant

Calochortus gunnisonii commonly known as Rocky Mountain mariposa or Gunnison mariposa lily is a North American species of flowering plant in the lily family. It is native to the western United States, primarily in the Rocky Mountains and Black Hills: Arizona, New Mexico, Utah, Colorado, Wyoming, Montana, South Dakota, Washington state (Grant County, northwestern Nebraska (Sioux County) and eastern Idaho (Fremont County).

Calochortus gunnisonii is a bulb-forming perennial with straight stems up to 55 cm tall. Flowers are white to purple with darker purple markings. The three petals have a wide rim above a deeply concave center lined with hairs. Between and behind each broad petal are three narrow, lanceolate, sepals.

Varieties

- Calochortus gunnisonii var. gunnisonii - most of species range
- Calochortus gunnisonii var. perpulcher Cockerell - New Mexico

The subspecies Calochortus gunnisonii var. perpulcher (Pecos mariposa lily) is an uncommon yellow color form limited to Colfax, Mora, and San Miguel counties in New Mexico.

== Cultivation ==
Rocky Mountain mariposa is valued by gardeners in the American prairies and intermountain west for the elegance of its deeply cupped flowers with their recurved edges. Though they will successfully bloom and propagate outside their native range, they are closely adapted to the dry conditions of the plains and western mountains. Gardeners in wet climates must take careful precautions against excessive moisture in all seasons, but particularly during the winter. Often a deep layer of gravel 10–15 cm deep will be placed around 6 cm under the bulbs for extra drainage. They require a well draining, but not sandy, fine textured soil without much organic matter. Bulbs are planted 10 cm deep. In a favorable climate they will live as much as 30 years.

== Gallery ==
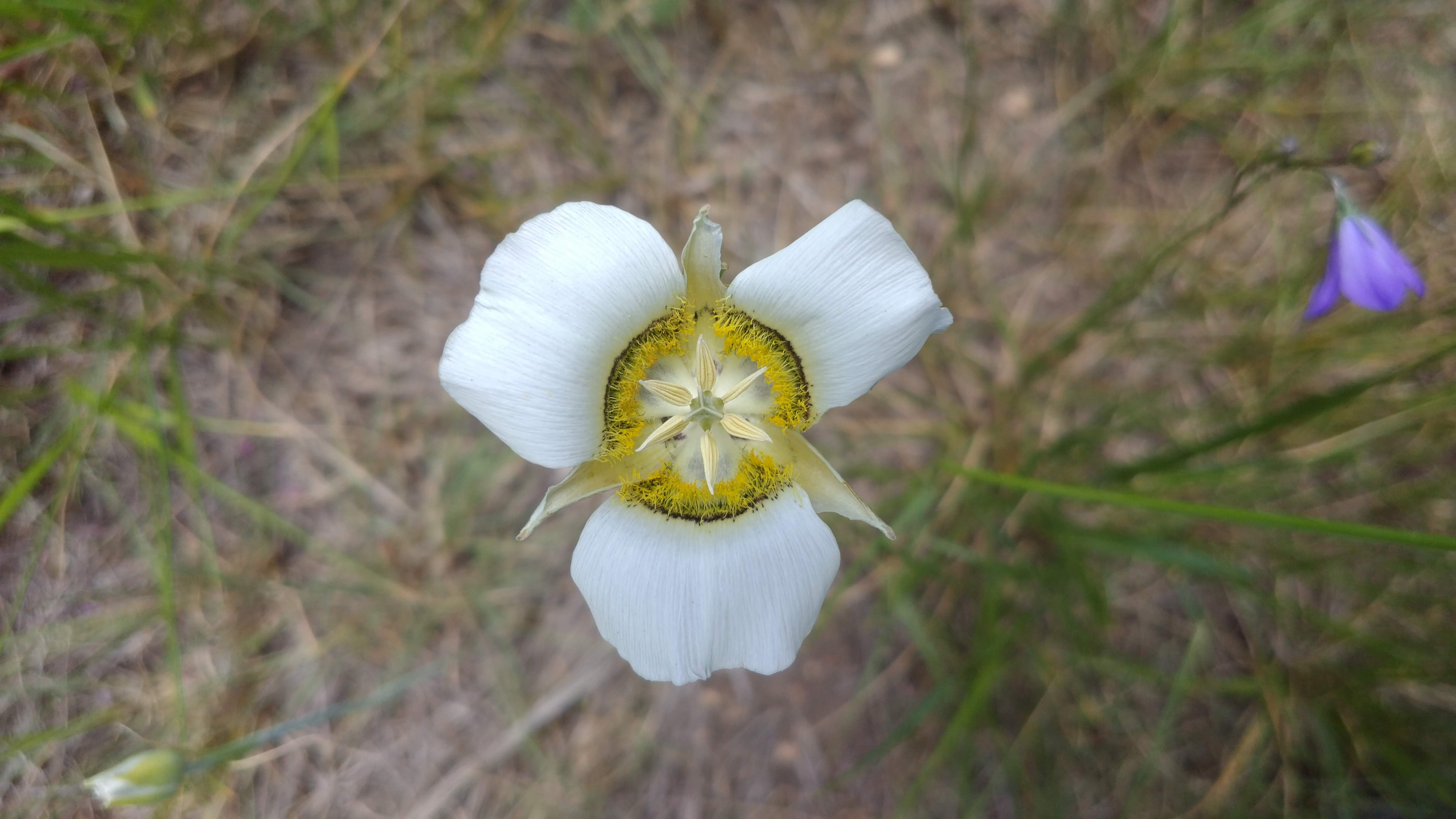
Calochortus gunnisonii, Teller County, CO
