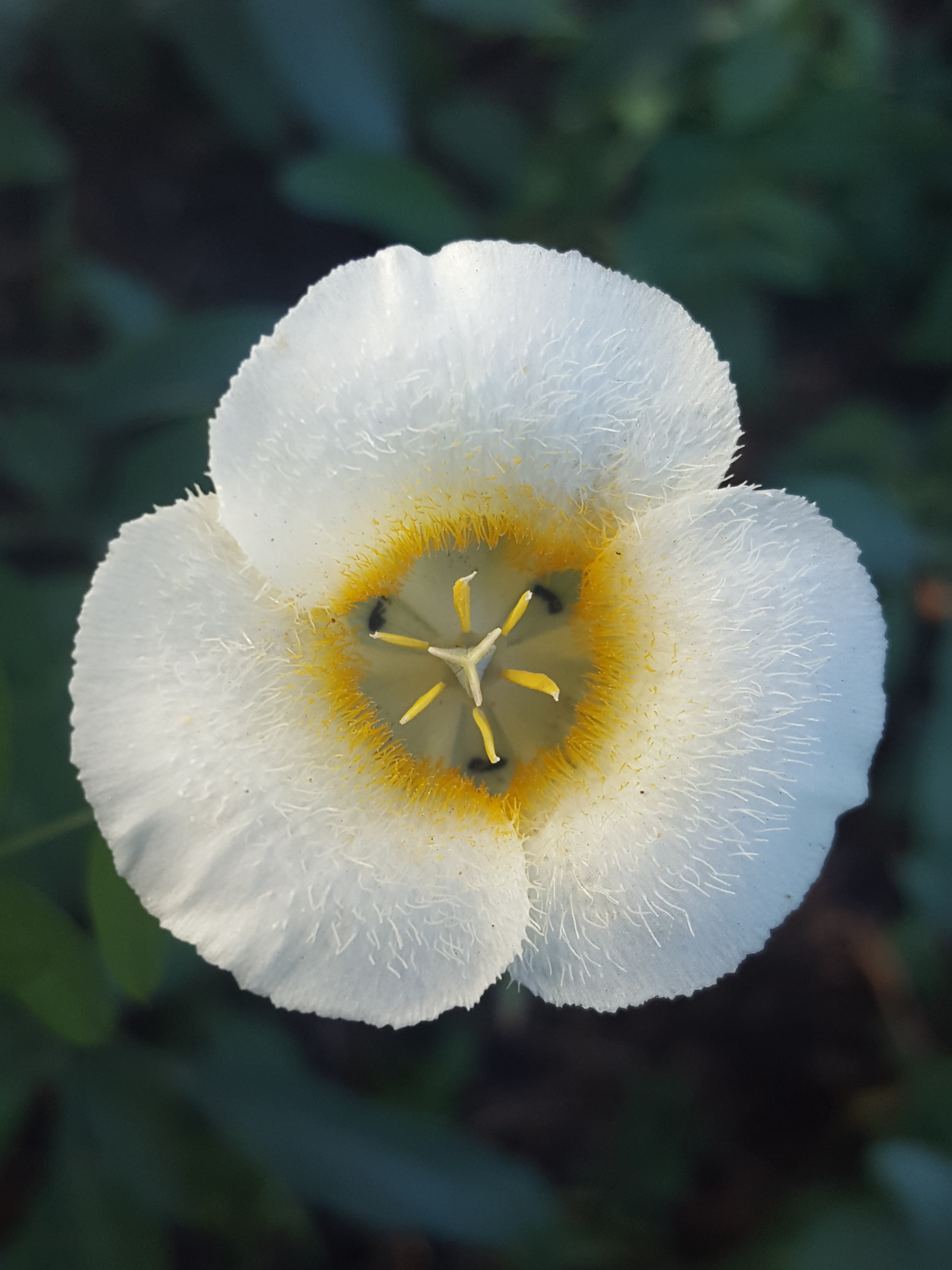

Scientific classification
- Kingdom: Plantae
- Clade: Tracheophytes
- Clade: Angiosperms
- Clade: Monocots
- Order: Liliales
- Family: Liliaceae
- Genus: Calochortus
- Species: C. subalpinus

Binomial name
- Calochortus subalpinus Piper

Synonyms
- Calochortus lobbii Purdy

= Calochortus subalpinus =

Species of flowering plant

Calochortus subalpinus, the subalpine mariposa lily, is a North American species of flowering plants in the lily family native to the northwestern United States (States of Washington and Oregon).

== Description ==
Calochortus subalpinus is a perennial herb producing an unbranched stem up to about 30 centimeters tall. Flowers are white to pale lavender with white and orange hairs on the petals.
