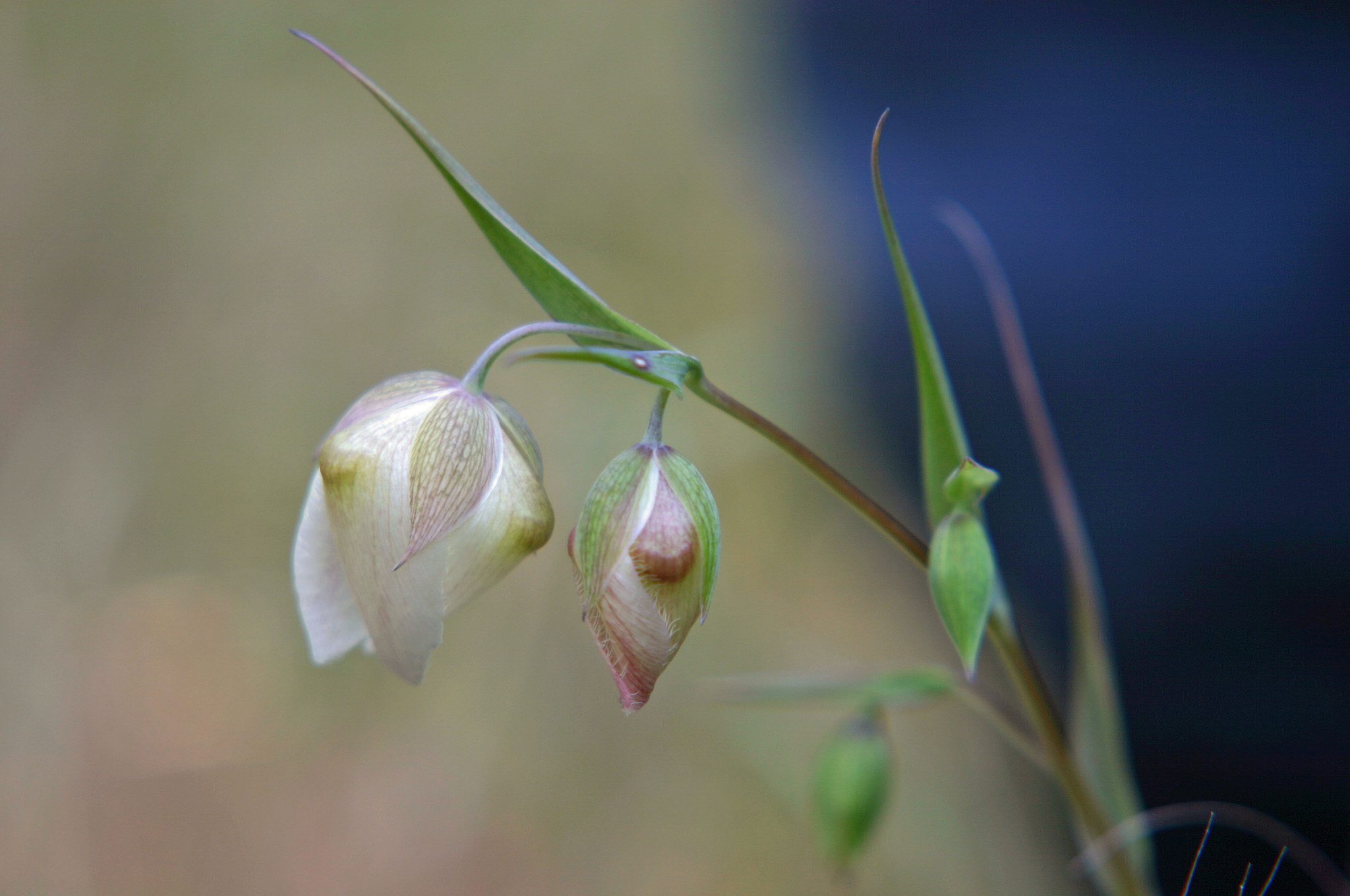

Conservation status
- Apparently Secure (NatureServe)

Scientific classification
- Kingdom: Plantae
- Clade: Embryophytes
- Clade: Tracheophytes
- Clade: Spermatophytes
- Clade: Angiosperms
- Clade: Monocots
- Order: Liliales
- Family: Liliaceae
- Genus: Calochortus
- Species: C. albus

Binomial name
- Calochortus albus Dougl. ex Benth.

= Calochortus albus =

Species of flowering plant

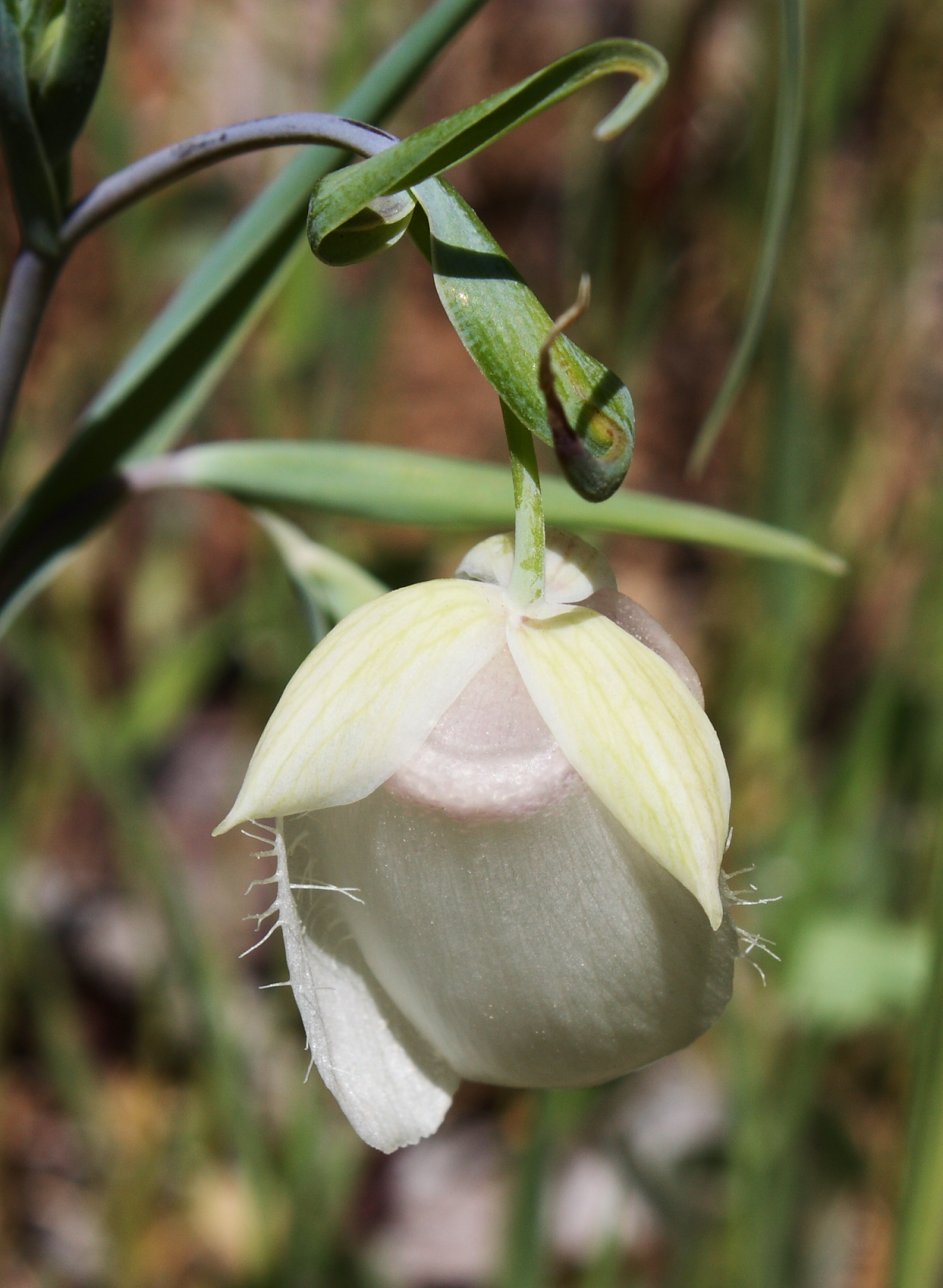
Flower detail

Calochortus albus is a North American species in the genus Calochortus in the family Liliaceae. It is also known by the common names fairy lantern, white fairy lantern, pink fairy lantern, lantern of the fairies, globe lily, white globe lily, white globe-tulip, alabaster tulip, Indian bells, satin bells, snowy lily-bell, and snow drops.

== Description ==
Widespread, variable species, blooming in winter and spring and going dormant after anthesis (flowering period) until the start of the autumn rains.

- Height: 20– 30–60–80 cm high at maturity.
- Stems: Stems are erect, to arching, slender, glaucous, and simple to branching, reaching 7.5- 20- 70- 80 cm.
- Leaves: Leaves come in two types: cauline or basal (radical). One long basal leaf is present during blooming, along with several cauline leaves, and foliaceous bracts below the flowers.
  - Basal/radical leaves: Basal leaves measure 20– 30– 50– 70 cm in length, 1–5 cm in width, and are lax, shiny, and persistent.
  - Cauline leaves: 2-6 lanceolate to linear leaves, measuring 5– 15–25 cm in length.
- Inflorescences: Flowers are borne in groups of 1- 2- many. Bracts are generally paired, lanceolate, and measure 1–5 cm in length.
  - Flowers: Delicate, pendent, nodding, 2–3 cm closed orbs of pearly white, to pink, to deep pink, to almost wine-red, occasionally greenish. Flowers from late March- April–June- early July.
    - Though the flowers of C. albus may occasionally be flushed pink, those which are deep rose in colour and are found from the southwest San Francisco Bay to outer south coast ranges may be assignable to C. albus var. rubellus, if recognized taxonomically.
  - Perianth is oblong and is typically closed at the tip.
    - Sepals: Three ovate to lanceolate sepals measuring 1-1.5 cm long, appressed to the petals, rarely recurved. Sepals may be white, green, greenish-white, or rosy red, and are shorter than the petals.
    - Petals: Three elliptic or wider petals, with the insides being sparsely ciliate (having a fringe of hairs), with yellowish, slender hairs above the nectary or along the gland. Satiny petals measure 2-2.5 cm long, overlap slightly, are closed at the tip, and may have a green, copper, pink, lavender, or purple tinge on the outside of the flower, typically near the base of the petals and around the protruding glandular area.
  - Nectary: Crescent-shaped, shallowly to deeply depressed, with several transverse, fringed membranes with white or yellow glandular hairs measuring 1/3-2/3 of the width of the petals.
  - Stamens: Short, oblong, abruptly tipped, white to light pink stamens measuring 4 mm in length.
    - Filaments: 4 – 5 mm in length, dilated at the base.
    - Anthers: White to cream, oblong and obtuse, measuring 4 mm in length.
- Fruit: Nodding, elliptic-oblong, prominently 3-winged capsule, measuring 2- 2.5- 4 cm in length.
- Seeds: Dark brown and irregularly shaped.

== Habitat ==
Widespread in shady to open woods and scrub, partially shaded grasslands, exposed coastal bluffs, and is often found in rocky places. May be found in many plant communities below 5,000 ft or 2,000m, including foothill woodlands, yellow pine forests, and chaparral.

== Range ==
Present throughout the southern two-thirds of California. May be found in the Sierra Nevada foothills, southern coast ranges, and peninsular ranges, from Baja California, to San Diego to the San Francisco Bay Area, extending to northern California and the California Channel Islands.

== Cultivation ==
- Light : Prefers sun to partial shade.
- Soil: Adaptable, but prefers well-drained soil.
- Water: Drought tolerant to moderate. During its dormant period, this species receives little or no rain in the wild. In cultivation, give a regular supply of water in the growing season, then the bulbs need to dry when the leaves begin to yellow. Premature autumn growth and poor drainage are often the causes of bulb loss.
- Zone: Hardy to -18 °C, and possibly as low as -23 °C. USDA zones 9-10.

== Propagation ==
This species grows from seed only; no bulbils or offsets are formed. Seeds require no treatment to aid germination. When grown from seed, C. albus may be expected to bloom in the 3rd or 4th year.

Hybridizes with Calochortus monophyllus.

== Etymology ==
Albus comes from Latin, and means 'white' or 'bright'. Calochortus is derived from Greek meaning 'beautiful grass', a reference to the characteristic grass-like foliage of the genus.
