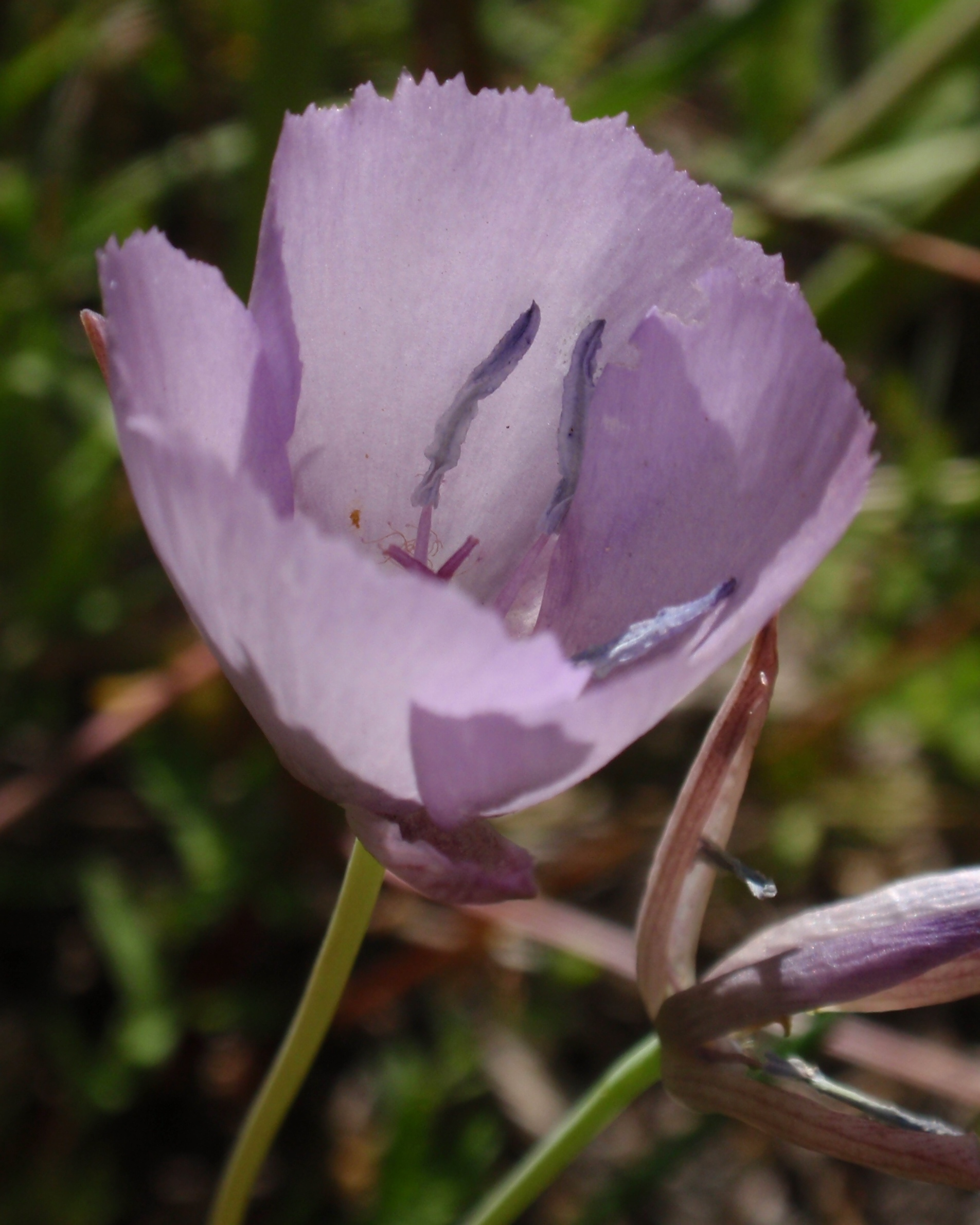

Conservation status
- Vulnerable (NatureServe)

Scientific classification
- Kingdom: Plantae
- Clade: Tracheophytes
- Clade: Angiosperms
- Clade: Monocots
- Order: Liliales
- Family: Liliaceae
- Genus: Calochortus
- Species: C. nudus

Binomial name
- Calochortus nudus S.Wats.

Synonyms
- Calochortus shastensis Purdy; Calochortus nudus var. shastensis (Purdy) Jeps.

= Calochortus nudus =

Species of flowering plant

Calochortus nudus is a North American species of flowering plant in the lily family known by the common name naked mariposa lily.

It is native to the mountains of California and southwestern Oregon, where it grows in wet areas such as meadows and lakeside bogs.

== Description ==
Calochortus nudus is a perennial producing an unbranching stem up to about 25 centimeters tall. The basal leaf is 5 to 15 centimeters long and does not wither at flowering.

The inflorescence bears one or more erect, bell-shaped flowers. Each flower has three small, pointed sepals and three wider petals all pinkish or lavender in color. The petals are mostly hairless and about 1.5 centimeters long.

The fruit is a capsule about 2 centimeters long.

The "nudus" part of the name, literally meaning "nude", refers to the lack of hairs on the petals. Such hairs are present on many other species in the genus.

== Distribution and habitat ==
Calochortus nudus grows primarily in the Sierra Nevada and southern Cascades, from Josephine and Jackson Counties in Oregon to Tulare County in California. One additional report indicates an outlying population in eastern San Bernardino County. It grows in moist, grassy areas, lakes, and bog margins.
