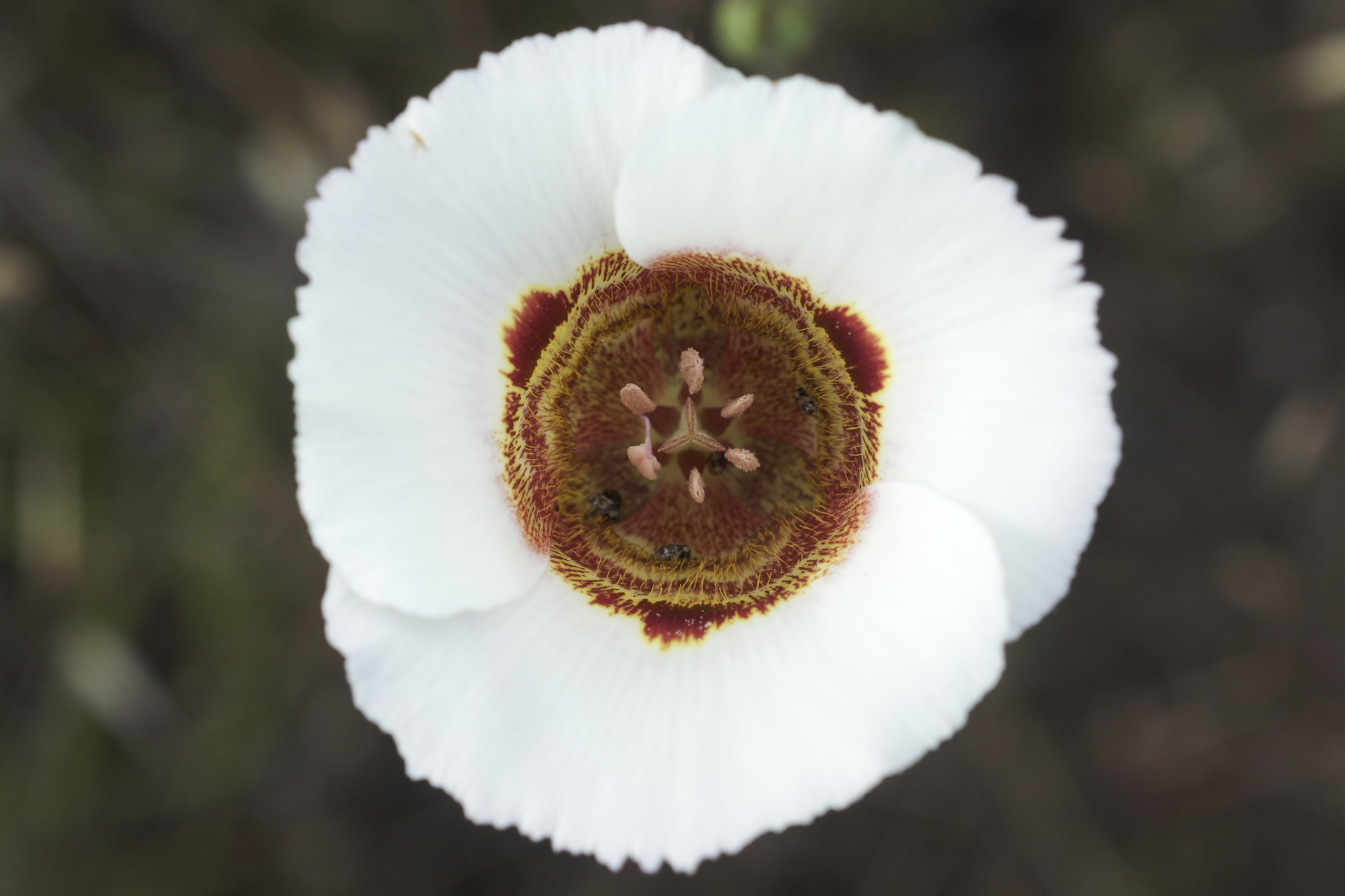

Conservation status
- Vulnerable (NatureServe)

Scientific classification
- Kingdom: Plantae
- Clade: Tracheophytes
- Clade: Angiosperms
- Clade: Monocots
- Order: Liliales
- Family: Liliaceae
- Genus: Calochortus
- Species: C. vestae

Binomial name
- Calochortus vestae Purdy

Synonyms
- Synonymy: Calochortus vesta Purdy, misspelling; Calochortus venustus var. vestae Purdy; Calochortus luteus var. vestae (Purdy) Jeps.; Calochortus venustus var. brachysepalus Regel; Calochortus luteus var. oculatus S.Watson; Calochortus oculatus (S.Watson) Wallace

= Calochortus vestae =

Species of flowering plant

Calochortus vestae is a California species of flowering plants in the lily family known by the common name Coast Range mariposa lily. It is grows primarily in the forests of the North Coast Ranges of California (Sonoma, Lake, and Mendocino Counties), with additional populations in the southernmost Cascades in Shasta County and also in foothills of the Sierra Nevada. It generally grows in clay soils.

== Description ==
Calochortus vestae is a perennial herb producing a branching stem between 30 and 50 centimeters tall. The basal leaf is 10 to 20 centimeters long and withers by flowering.

The inflorescence is a loose cluster of 1 to 6 erect, bell-shaped flowers. Each flower has three petals up to about 4 centimeters long and three sepals 2 to 3 centimeters long beneath. The petals are white to purplish in color with a central area of pale yellow with a darker reddish or brownish blotch within. At the base of each petal is a red-streaked patch of hairs.
