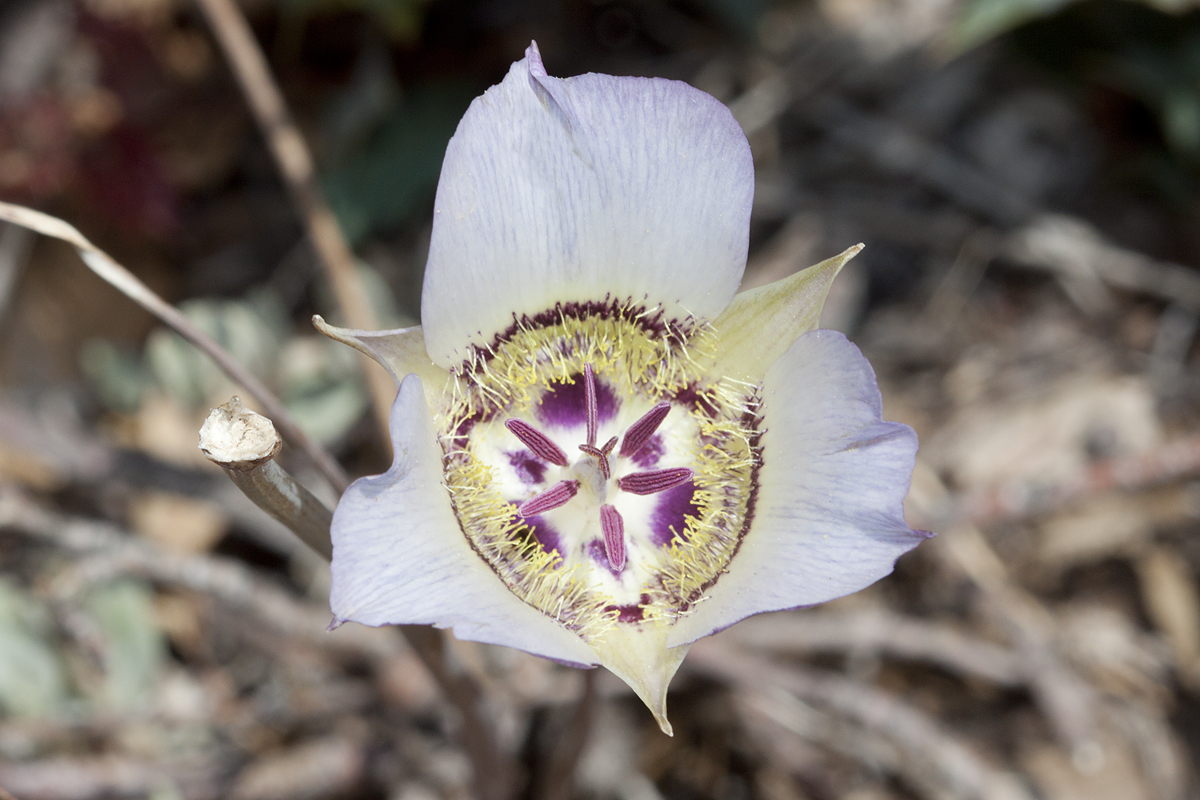

Conservation status
- Apparently Secure (NatureServe)

Scientific classification
- Kingdom: Plantae
- Clade: Tracheophytes
- Clade: Angiosperms
- Clade: Monocots
- Order: Liliales
- Family: Liliaceae
- Genus: Calochortus
- Species: C. ambiguus

Binomial name
- Calochortus ambiguus (M.E.Jones) Ownbey

Synonyms
- Calochortus watsonii var. ambiguus (Ownbey) M.E.Jones

= Calochortus ambiguus =

Species of flowering plant

Calochortus ambiguus, the Arizona mariposa lily or doubting mariposa lily, is a perennial plant in the lily family (liliaceae) that grows at higher elevations of the Sonoran Desert regions of Arizona, western New Mexico, southern Utah, and Sonora.

Calochortus ambiguus is a bulb-forming herb. Flowers are white or very pale lavender, with a green center and reddish-purple anthers.
