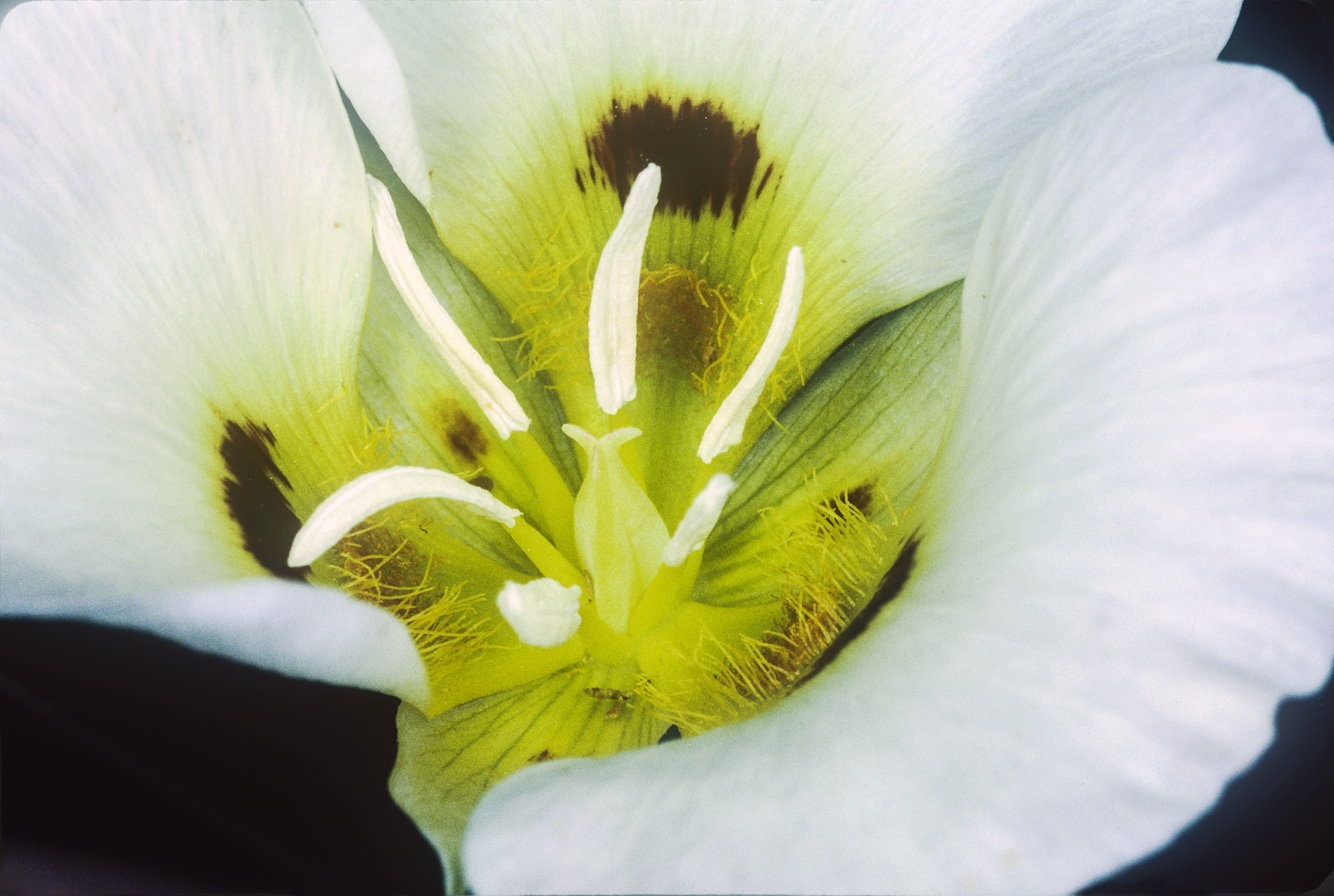

Conservation status
- Imperiled (NatureServe)

Scientific classification
- Kingdom: Plantae
- Clade: Embryophytes
- Clade: Tracheophytes
- Clade: Spermatophytes
- Clade: Angiosperms
- Clade: Monocots
- Order: Liliales
- Family: Liliaceae
- Genus: Calochortus
- Species: C. syntrophus

Binomial name
- Calochortus syntrophus Callahan

= Calochortus syntrophus =

Species of flowering plant

Calochortus syntrophus is a rare species of flowering plant in the lily family known by the common names Callahan's mariposa lily and clustered mariposa lily. It is endemic to northern California, where it occurs in a remote area north of Montgomery Creek in Shasta County. It has also been spotted in adjacent Tehama County. Its habitat includes open, rocky areas with moist or wet soils in oak woodland territory. It was first discovered in 1993 and its description was published the following year.

This plant produces a thick, waxy stem 40 to 60 centimeters in maximum height. It grows from a bulb which sometimes divides and sends up new stems nearby. The leaves are up to 20 or 30 centimeters long near the base of the plant and those occurring higher on the stem are shorter. The inflorescence is a solitary flower or an umbel-like cluster of up to five flowers. Each flower has lance-shaped sepals 2 to 4 centimeters long. The bell-shaped bloom has three whitish petals 3 to 5 centimeters long which are generally marked with a reddish-brown blotch near the base. The flower bases are yellow with whiskery glandular hairs. The petals turn from white to pink as they age.
