= Calochortus spatulatus =

Scientific classification
- Kingdom: Plantae
- Clade: Tracheophytes
- Clade: Angiosperms
- Clade: Monocots
- Order: Liliales
- Family: Liliaceae
- Genus: Calochortus
- Species: C. spatulatus

Binomial name
- Calochortus spatulatus S.Wats.

Species of flowering plant

Calochortus spatulatus is a Mexican species of plants in the lily family. It is widespread across much of Mexico from Sonora and Chihuahua south as far as Oaxaca.

Calochortus spatulatus is a bulb-forming herb up to 40 cm tall, sometimes branched, sometimes not. Flowers are purple, oriented horizontally or sometimes nodding (hanging downward).
