= Calochortus exilis =

Scientific classification
- Kingdom: Plantae
- Clade: Tracheophytes
- Clade: Angiosperms
- Clade: Monocots
- Order: Liliales
- Family: Liliaceae
- Genus: Calochortus
- Species: C. exilis

Binomial name
- Calochortus exilis Painter

Species of flowering plant

Calochortus exilis is a rare Mexican species of plants in the lily family. It is native to mountains in the State of Hidalgo in east-central Mexico.

== Description ==
Calochortus exilis is a bulb-forming herb up to 15 cm tall, usually unbranched. Flowers are nodding (hanging) with yellow or purple sepals and white to lemon-yellow petals.
