= Calochortus balsensis =

Scientific classification
- Kingdom: Plantae
- Clade: Tracheophytes
- Clade: Angiosperms
- Clade: Monocots
- Order: Liliales
- Family: Liliaceae
- Genus: Calochortus
- Species: C. balsensis

Binomial name
- Calochortus balsensis García-Mend.

Species of flowering plant

Calochortus balsensis is a Mexican species of flowering plants in the lily family. It is native to the States of Guerrero and Oaxaca in the southwestern part of the country.

Calochortus balsensis is a bulb-forming perennial up to 100 cm tall. Flowers are nodding (hanging), globose or subglobose, and yellow.
