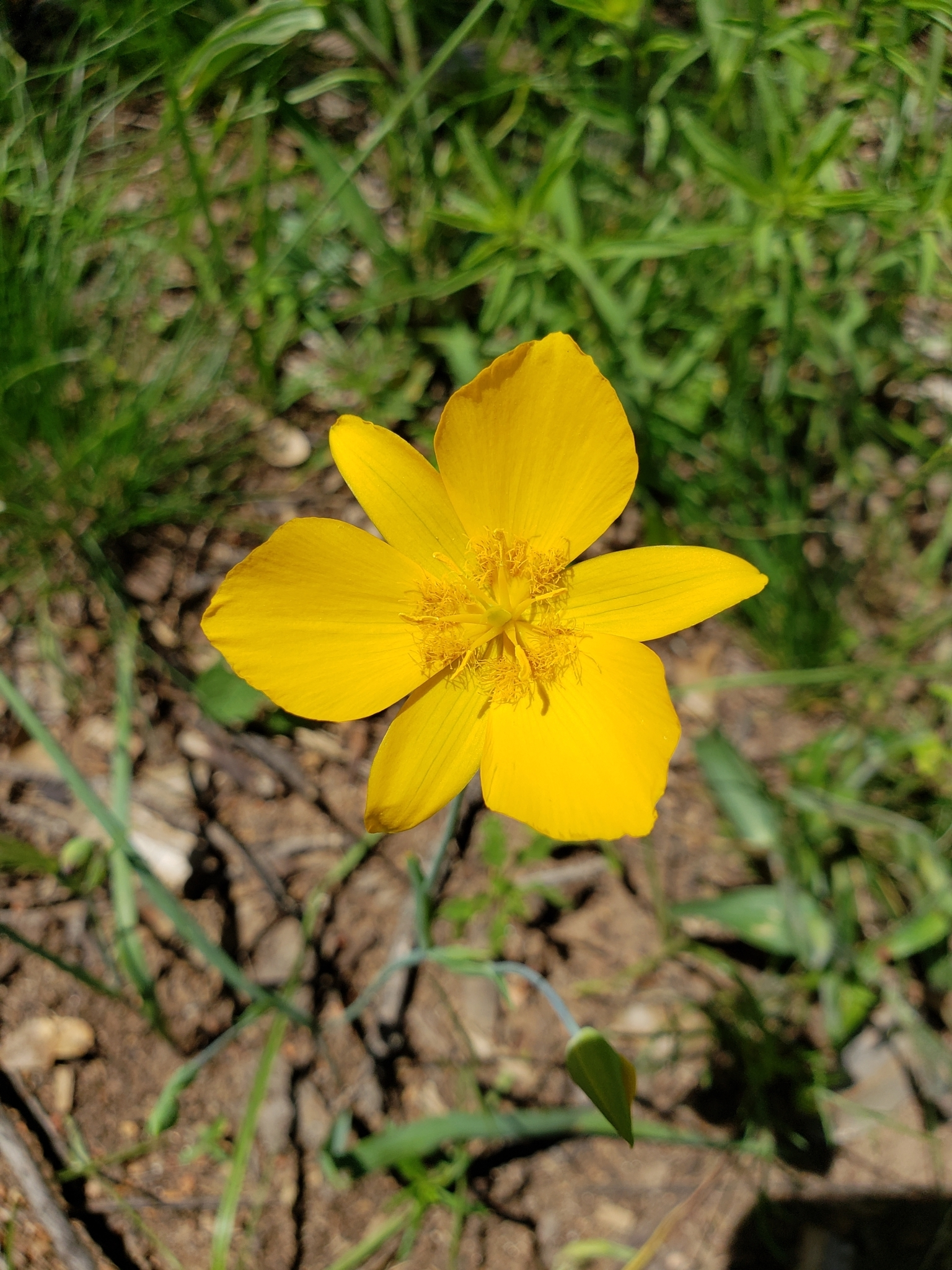

Scientific classification
- Kingdom: Plantae
- Clade: Tracheophytes
- Clade: Angiosperms
- Clade: Monocots
- Order: Liliales
- Family: Liliaceae
- Genus: Calochortus
- Species: C. venustulus

Binomial name
- Calochortus venustulus Greene

Synonyms
- Calochortus madrensis S.Watson; Calochortus venustulus var. madrensis (S.Watson) Reveal & W.J.Hess

= Calochortus venustulus =

Species of flowering plant

Calochortus venustulus is a Mexican species of plants in the lily family native to central and eastern Mexico and bearing yellow flowers. Two varieties are recognized.

- Calochortus venustulus var. imbricus Reveal & W.J.Hess - Durango
- Calochortus venustulus var. venustulus - Chihuahua, Durango, Jalisco, México State

The epithet venustulus is a Latin word meaning "charming" or "elegant", derived ultimately from the name of the goddess Venus, Goddess of Love.

The varietal epithet imbricus means "rainy", chosen because it was raining the day the authors collected the original specimens.
