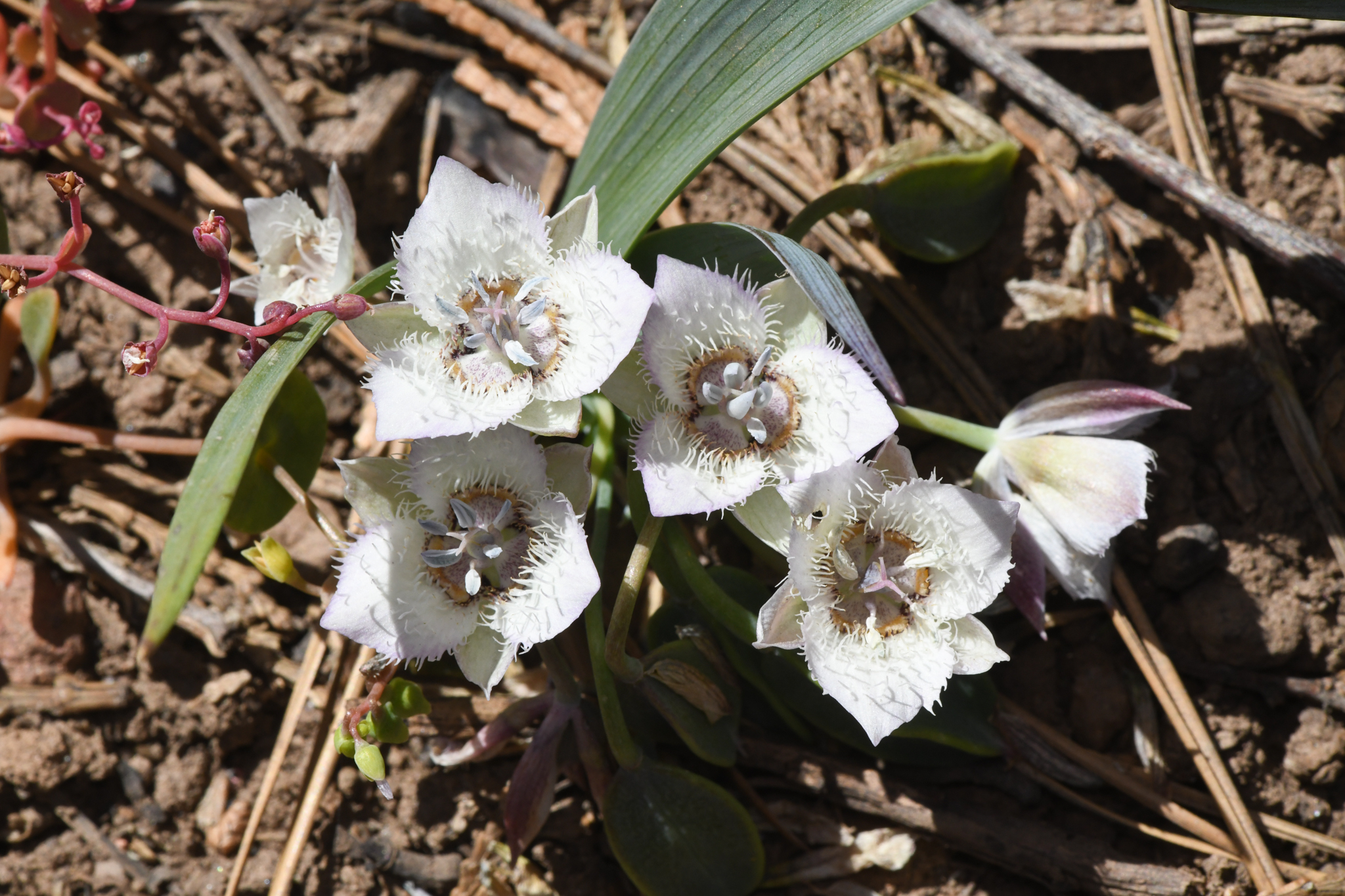

Conservation status
- Vulnerable (NatureServe)

Scientific classification
- Kingdom: Plantae
- Clade: Tracheophytes
- Clade: Angiosperms
- Clade: Monocots
- Order: Liliales
- Family: Liliaceae
- Genus: Calochortus
- Species: C. westonii

Binomial name
- Calochortus westonii Eastw.

Synonyms
- Calochortus coeruleus var. westonii (Eastw.) Ownbey

= Calochortus westonii =

Species of flowering plant

Calochortus westonii, common name Shirley Meadows star-tulip, is a rare endemic plant known only from the Greenhorn Mountains range of the southern Sierra Nevada, within Kern and Tulare Counties, California.

It grows in open locations in meadows and woodlands at elevations of 1,500–2,000 m (4,900–6,600 ft). It is vulnerable due to habitat loss from logging, development of ski resort, and fuel breaks.

== Description ==
Calochortus westonii is bulb-forming herb attaining a height of up to 15 cm (5.9 in). Leaves are basal, persistent, and linear, up to 20 cm (7.9 in) long.

Sepals are green, up to 10 mm (0.39 in) long. Petals are lanceolate, up to 12 mm (0.47 in) long, with long flexible hairs along the margins. Flowers bloom from May to June and petals are white or blue in color.
