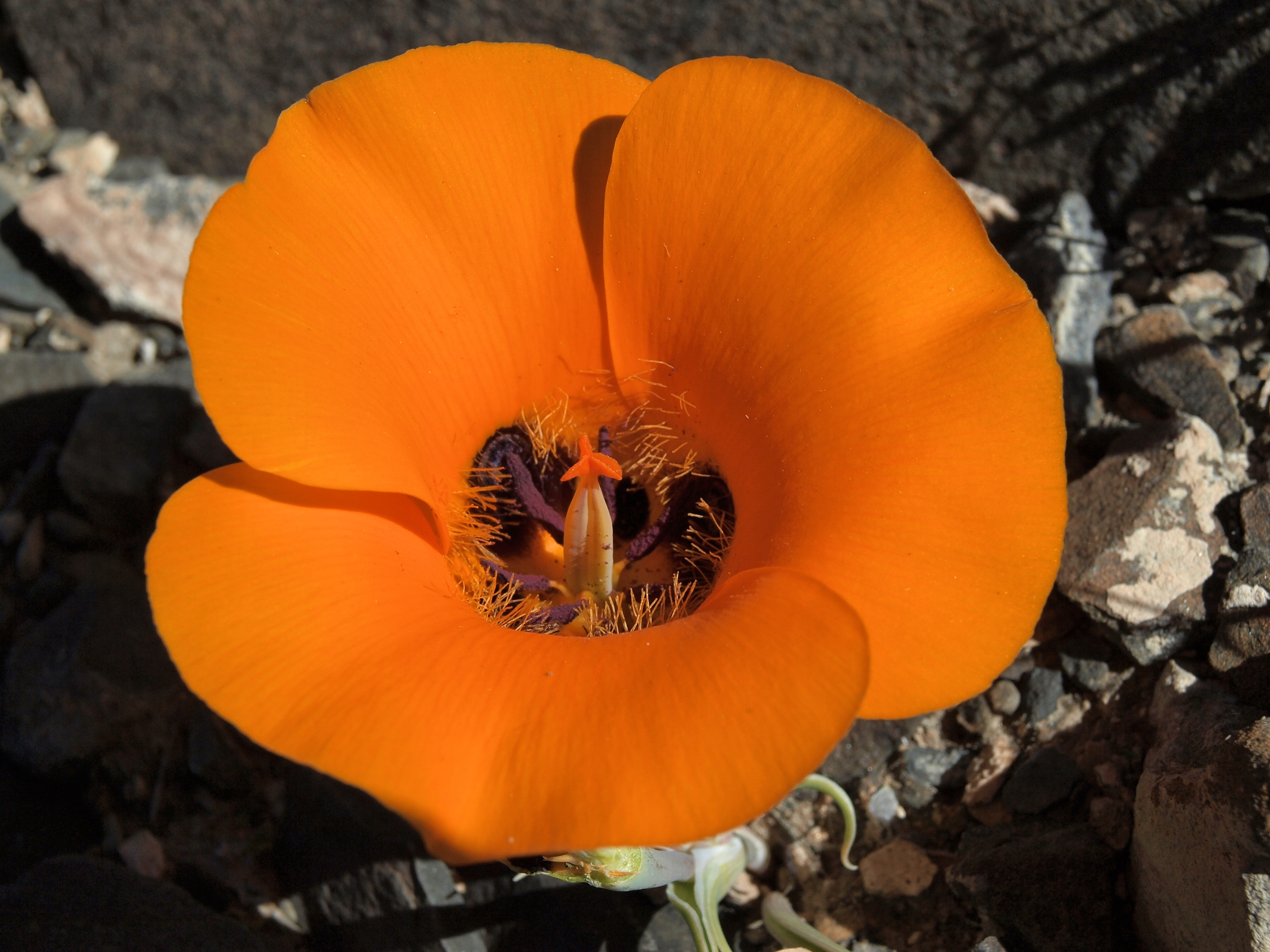

Scientific classification
- Kingdom: Plantae
- Clade: Tracheophytes
- Clade: Angiosperms
- Clade: Monocots
- Order: Liliales
- Family: Liliaceae
- Genus: Calochortus
- Species: C. kennedyi

Binomial name
- Calochortus kennedyi Porter, 1877

Synonyms
- Calochortus speciosus M.E.Jones

= Calochortus kennedyi =

Species of flowering plant

Calochortus kennedyi is a North American species of flowering plant in the lily family known by the common name desert mariposa lily.

It is native to the deserts of the Southwestern United States (Arizona, southern California, southern Nevada, southern Utah and western Texas), and northern Mexico (Sonora, Chihuahua). In California it is found in the Mojave Desert and rain shadowed eastern slopes of the Transverse Ranges.

Species is named for plant collector William L. Kennedy.

== Description ==
Calochortus kennedyi is a perennial herb which produces a slender, unbranching, sometimes twisting stem up to 50 centimeters tall, but generally shorter. There is a basal leaf 10 to 20 centimeters long which is waxy in texture and withers at flowering.

The inflorescence consists of 1 to 6 erect bell-shaped flowers in a loose cluster. Each flower has three sepals and three petals which are usually spotted at the bases. The petals may be 5 centimeters long and are yellow, orange, or red in color.

The fruit is an angled, striped capsule up to 6 centimeters in length.

Varieties

- Calochortus kennedyi var. kennedyi - most of species range
- Calochortus kennedyi var. munzii — Arizona, Sonora, Mojave Desert in California
