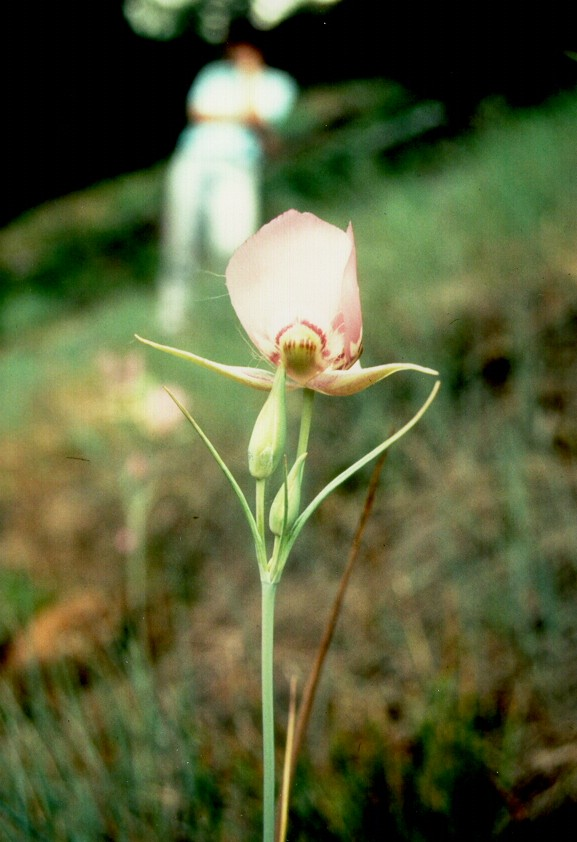
- In Clearwater National Forest, Idaho

Scientific classification
- Kingdom: Plantae
- Clade: Tracheophytes
- Clade: Angiosperms
- Clade: Monocots
- Order: Liliales
- Family: Liliaceae
- Genus: Calochortus
- Species: C. nitidus

Binomial name
- Calochortus nitidus Douglas 1828 not Torr. 1857

Synonyms
- Cyclobothra nitida (Douglas) Kunth

= Calochortus nitidus =

Species of flowering plant

Calochortus nitidus, the broadfruit mariposa lily, is a North American species of flowering plants in the lily family native to the northwestern United States.

Calochortus nitidus is found primarily in northern Idaho and southeastern Washington, but isolated populations have been reported from Jackson County in southwestern Oregon.

== Description ==
Calochortus nitidus is a perennial herb producing an unbranched stem up to about 40 centimeters tall. flowers are lavender with darker purple markings.
