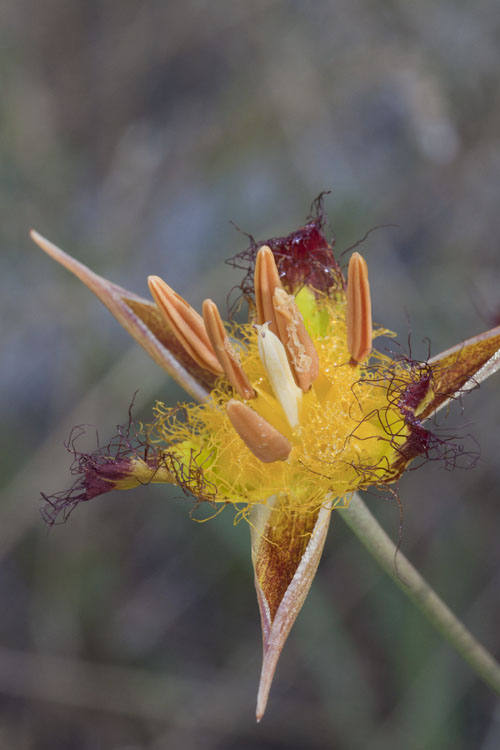

Conservation status
- Imperiled (NatureServe)

Scientific classification
- Kingdom: Plantae
- Clade: Tracheophytes
- Clade: Angiosperms
- Clade: Monocots
- Order: Liliales
- Family: Liliaceae
- Genus: Calochortus
- Species: C. obispoensis

Binomial name
- Calochortus obispoensis Lemmon

Synonyms
- Calochortus weedii var. obispoensis (Lemmon) Purdy.; Cyclobothra obispoensis (Lemmon) Hoover

= Calochortus obispoensis =

Species of flowering plant

Calochortus obispoensis is a rare California species of flowering plants in the lily family known by the common name San Luis mariposa lily. It is endemic to San Luis Obispo County, California, where it grows in the chaparral of the coastal mountains, generally on serpentine soils.

== Description ==
Calochortus obispoensis is a perennial herb producing a slender, branched stem up to 60 centimeters tall. The basal leaf is 20 to 30 centimeters in length and withers at flowering. There may be smaller leaves located along the stem.

The inflorescence bears 2 to 6 erect flowers. Each spreading flower has three reflexed sepals up to 3 centimeters long and three flat petals each up to 2 centimeters long. The petals are yellow or orange in color with darker tips and fringed and coated in long, dark purple or red hairs. The fruit is an angled capsule up to 4 centimeters long which contains translucent yellow seeds.
