= Francis Marion Ownbey =

U.S. botanist (1910–1974)

- Born: 29 September 1910; Kirksville, Missouri
- Died: 7 December 1974 (aged 64)

Francis Marion Ownbey (29 September 1910 – 7 December 1974) was an American botanist.

Ownbey earned his Ph.D. at the Washington University in St. Louis, with Jesse M. Greenman. Ownbey began to teach at Washington State University in 1939, and became director of the herbarium. During World War II, he was sent to Ecuador as part of the Cinchona Missions.

Ownbey was especially interested in the genus Tragopogon. He was awarded a Guggenheim fellowship in 1954 for his investigation into the genetics of the genus.

He died in 1974, and the herbarium at WSU was named in his honor. His brother, Gerald Bruce Ownbey, was also a published botanist.

== Select publications ==
=== Books ===
- Francis Marion Ownbey, Hannah Caroline Aase. 1955. Cytotaxonomic studies in Allium. p. 1-3, Research Studies of the State College of Washington: Monographic supplement. Editor State College of Washington, 106 pp.
- Francis Marion Ownbey. 1939. A monograph of the genus Calochortus. Editor Washington Univ. 670 pp.
