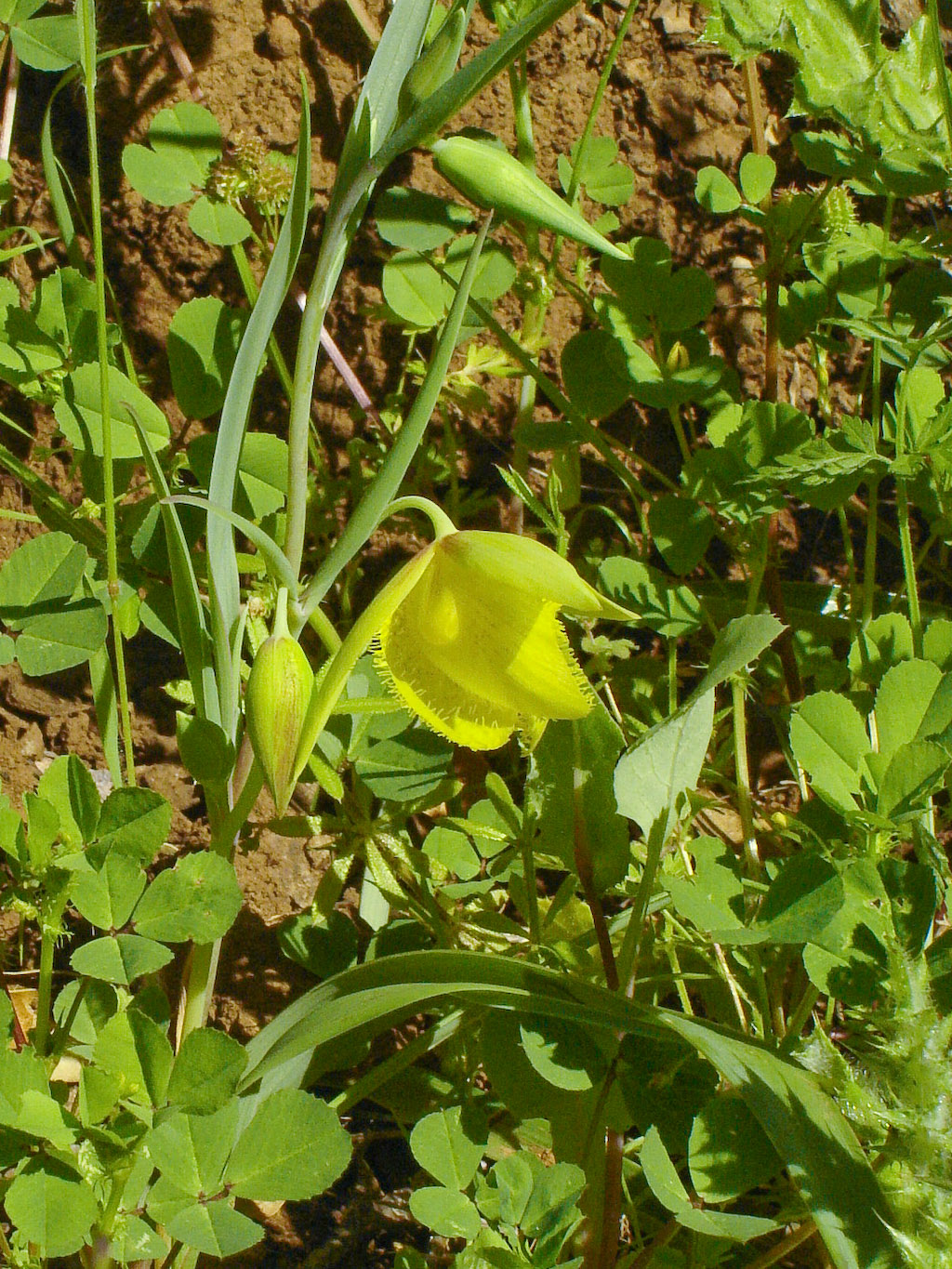

Conservation status
- Imperiled (NatureServe)

Scientific classification
- Kingdom: Plantae
- Clade: Tracheophytes
- Clade: Angiosperms
- Clade: Monocots
- Order: Liliales
- Family: Liliaceae
- Genus: Calochortus
- Species: C. pulchellus

Binomial name
- Calochortus pulchellus (Benth.) Alph. Wood 1868, not Dougl. ex Benth. 1835 (latter name not validly published)

Synonyms
- Cyclobothra pulchella Benth.; Calochortus pulchellus Dougl. ex Benth. 1835, not validly published

= Calochortus pulchellus =

Species of flowering plant

Calochortus pulchellus is a rare species of flowering plant in the lily family known by the common name Mt. Diablo fairy-lantern or Mount Diablo globelily.

Calochortus pulchellus is endemic to California, where it is mainly restricted to Mount Diablo of the Diablo Range, in Contra Costa County of the eastern San Francisco Bay Area. There are historical occurrences in the North California Coast Ranges, within Marin, Solano, Napa, and Humboldt Counties.

It grows in chaparral and woodland habitats, currently only known on the bayside−western slopes of Mount Diablo.

== Description ==
Calochortus pulchellus is a perennial herb growing a branching stem up to about 30 centimeters tall. The basal leaf is up to 40 centimeters long and does not wither at flowering; there are 2 or 3 smaller leaves higher up the stem.

The inflorescence is a solitary flower or a cluster of several flowers, which are nodding and usually spherical with all their petal tips touching. The three sepals and three petals are 2 or 3 centimeters long and pale to deep yellow. The petals are thinly hairy inside and often fringed with yellow hairs.

The fruit is a winged capsule 2-3 centimeters in length.

formerly included

- Calochortus pulchellus var. amabilis, now called Calochortus amabilis
- Calochortus pulchellus var. maculosus, now called Calochortus amabilis
- Calochortus pulchellus var. parviflorus, now called Calochortus monophyllus
