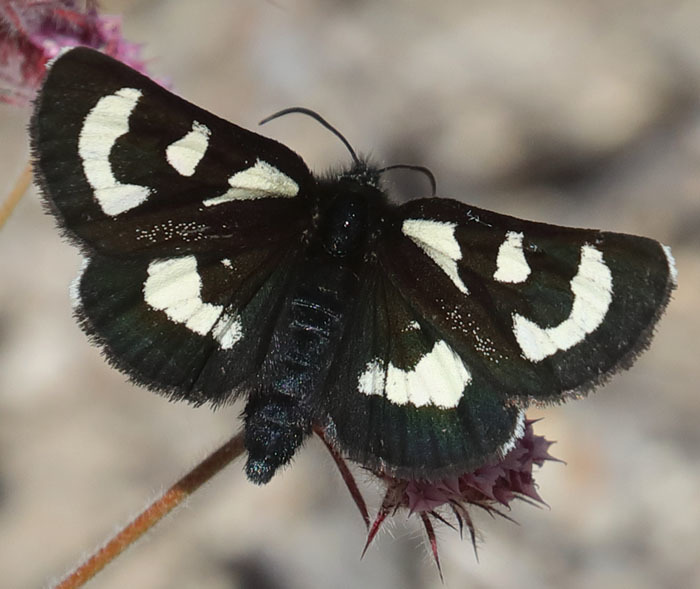
- Adult
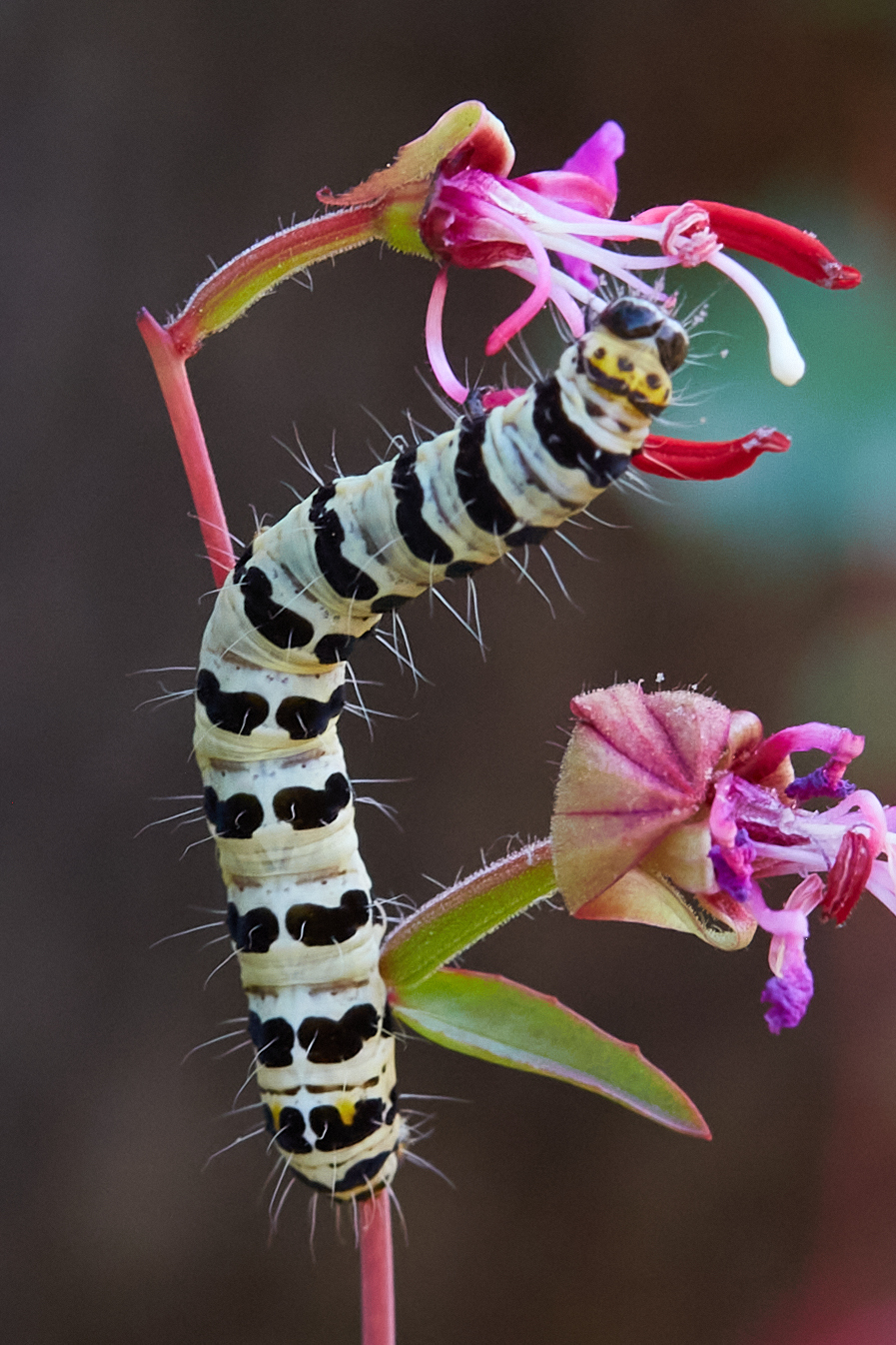
- Larva on Clarkia unguiculata

Scientific classification
- Domain: Eukaryota
- Kingdom: Animalia
- Phylum: Arthropoda
- Class: Insecta
- Order: Lepidoptera
- Superfamily: Noctuoidea
- Family: Noctuidae
- Genus: Alypia
- Species: A. mariposa

Binomial name
- Alypia mariposa Grote & Robinson, 1868

Synonyms
- Alypia lunata Stretch, 1872

= Alypia mariposa =

Mariposa forester

Species of moth

Alypia mariposa, the mariposa forester, is a moth of the family Noctuidae. The species was first described by Augustus Radcliffe Grote and Coleman Townsend Robinson in 1868. It is found in Coast Ranges and Sierra foothills of California, from Kern and San Luis Obispo counties in the south to Placer County in the north.

It resembles Alypia ridingsii except it lacks black lines through the white wing spots. Adults fly in April, May and June.

The larvae have been recorded feeding on Clarkia bottae and Clarkia unguiculata.

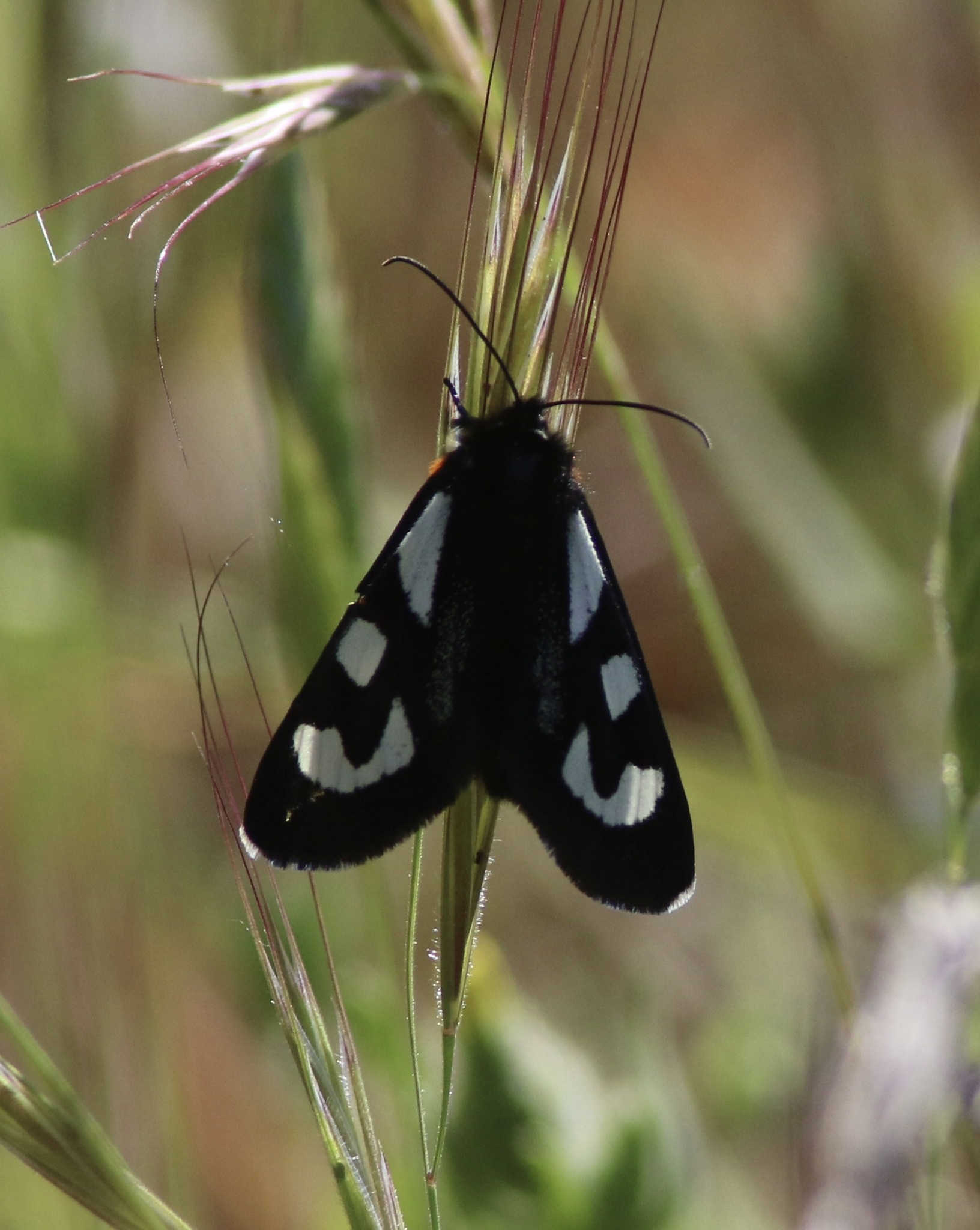
Wings at rest

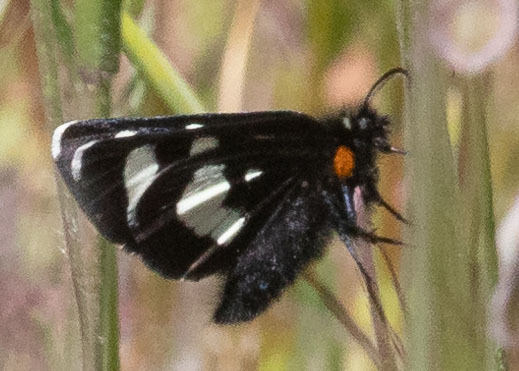
Side view
