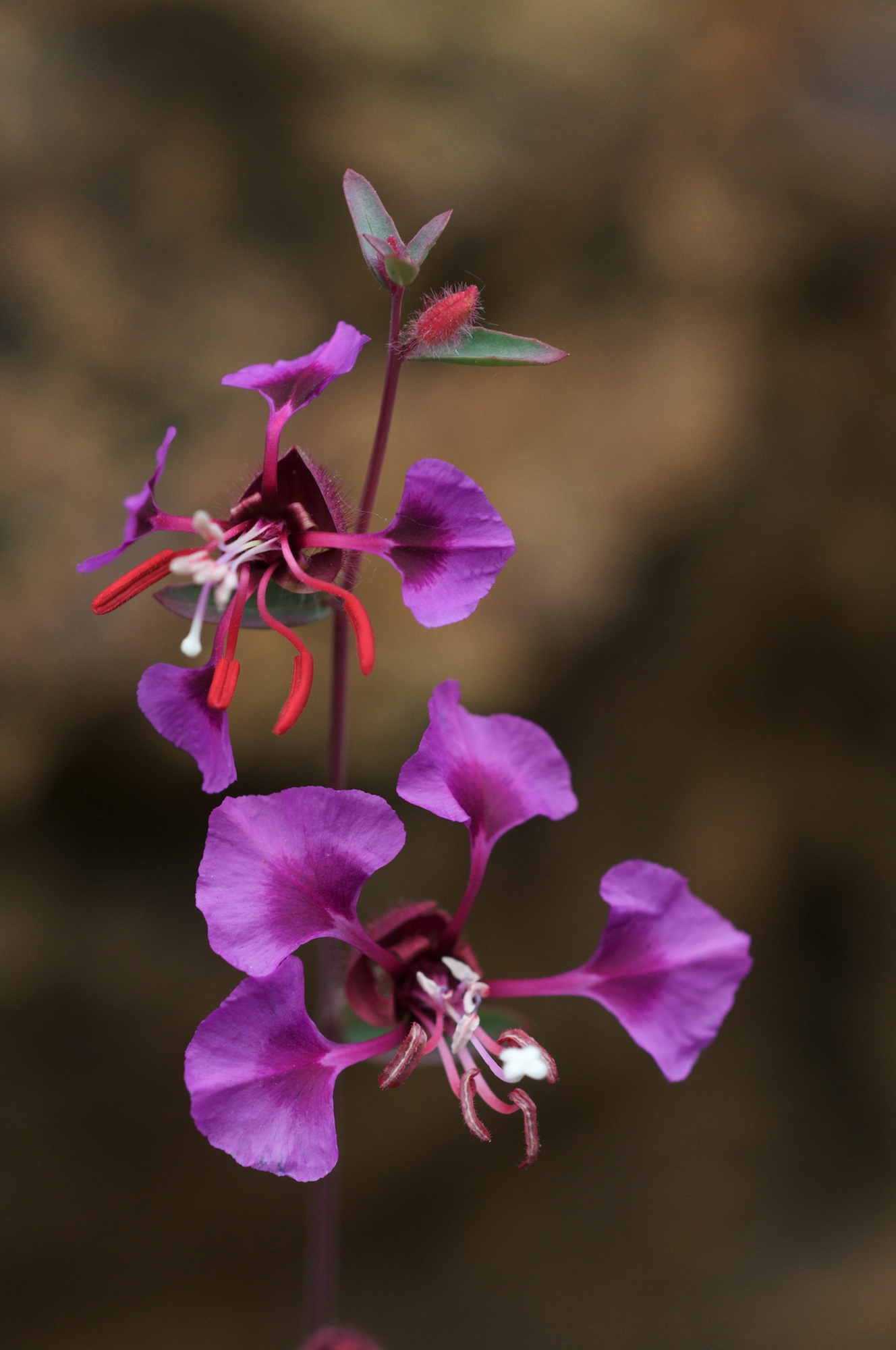

Conservation status
- Secure (NatureServe)

Scientific classification
- Kingdom: Plantae
- Clade: Embryophytes
- Clade: Tracheophytes
- Clade: Spermatophytes
- Clade: Angiosperms
- Clade: Eudicots
- Clade: Rosids
- Order: Myrtales
- Family: Onagraceae
- Genus: Clarkia
- Species: C. unguiculata

Binomial name
- Clarkia unguiculata Lindl.
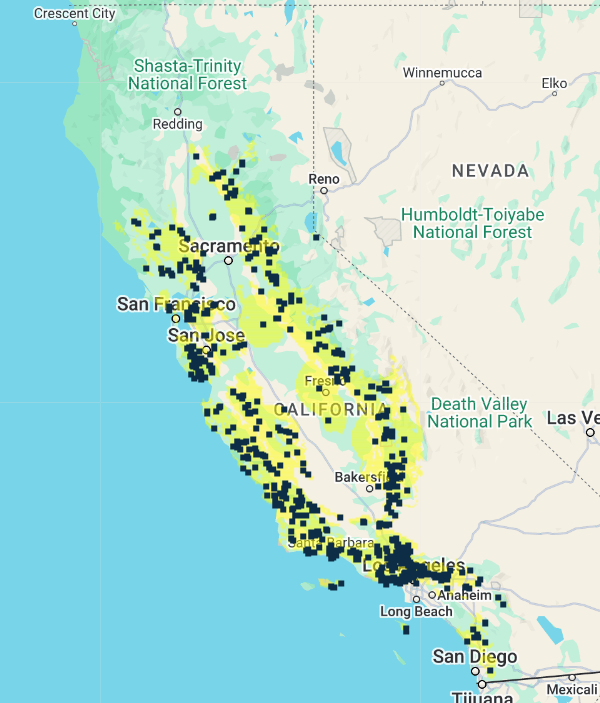
- Range in California

Synonyms
- Clarkia eiseneana Kellogg; Clarkia elegans Douglas; Clarkia elegans var. albopura Dreer; Oenothera elegans (Lilja) E.H.L.Krause; Phaeostoma douglasii Spach; Phaeostoma elegans Lilja

= Clarkia unguiculata =

Species of flowering plant

Clarkia unguiculata is a species of wildflower known by the common name elegant clarkia or mountain garland.

== Distribution and habitat ==
This plant is endemic to California, where it is found in many woodland habitats. It grows along the coastal ranges of Mendocino and San Diego. Clarkia unguiculata can also be found in the Sierran foothills. Specifically, it is common on the forest floor of many oak woodlands, along with typical understory wildflowers that include Calochortus luteus, Adelinia grandis and Delphinium variegatum. It flowers in the summer and fall and thrives in somewhat neutral soil pH. Commonly found on open slopes or slightly shaded areas. These slopes are below 5,000 feet (1,500 m) and have dry conditions, where the plant thrives.

== Description ==
C. unguiculata presents a spindly, hairless, waxy stem with a red hue. The species can grow up to 3 ft (0.9 m) tall with a small number of leaves populating the stem. The showy flowers have hairy, fused sepals forming a cup beneath the corolla, and four petals each one to 2.5 cm (1.0 in) long. The paddle-like petals come in shades of pink to reddish to purple and are slender and diamond-shaped or triangular in a raceme formation, in which each flower is connected to the main stalk by a pedicel, a short stem extension. There are eight long stamens, the outer four of which have large red anthers. The stigma protrudes from the flower and can be quite large. Its pistil is a long white structure, this combined with the red stamens allow this flower to be easily identifiable. The base of the stem has the leaves arranged in an opposite formation, however further up the stem the leaf arrangement becomes alternate. Produces a small indehiscent fruit, similar to a nut which hold the many little seeds.

== Ecology ==
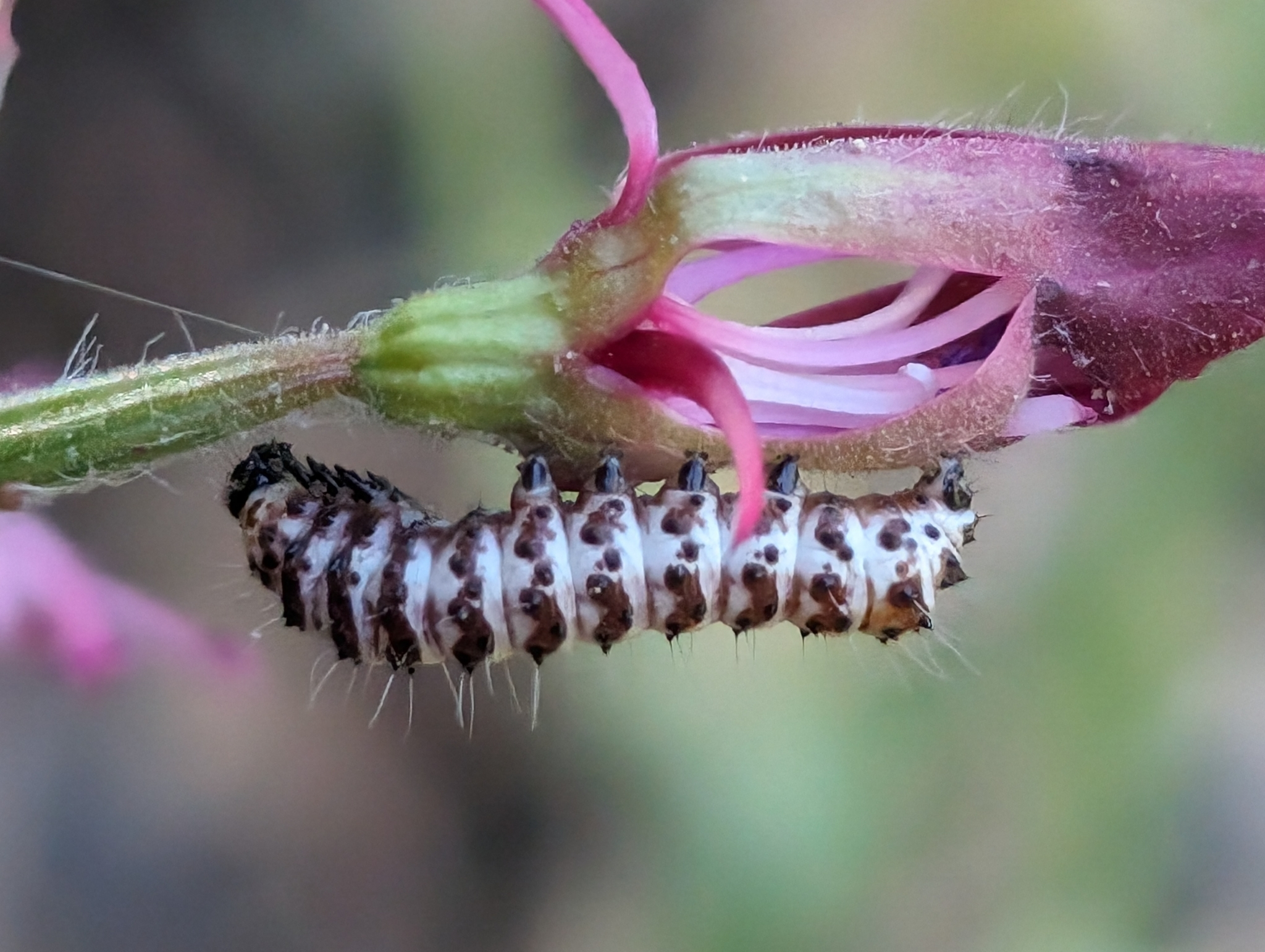
Mariposa forester larva on C. unguiculata

Clarkia unguiculata is pollinated by a variety of bees, butterflies and some bats. The main pollinator is Hesperapis regularis, a native species of bees found in similar environments to C. unguiculata. This plant has the ability to self-pollinate. This means the species is less reliant on the presence of pollinators like bees or butterflies to propagate itself.

The caterpillars of the mariposa forester feed on it.

== Cultivation and uses ==
This species is cultivated in gardens, requiring dry air and dry soil for it to bloom. It can be grown in any soil condition; sand, loamy or clay soils as long as the plant remains in dry conditions. As a hermaphroditic species, being pollinated by pollinators is very easy and requires less energy from the plant. The species cannot be grown in shaded areas, it must be exposed to the sun for majority of the day as it does not do well in cold conditions. If grown correctly, the seed will germinate within two weeks and bloom late summer and early fall.

Although not typically eaten, some parts of the plant are edible, specifically the seed. The seed can be eaten raw or cooked and ground into a fine powder.

== Commercial cultivars ==
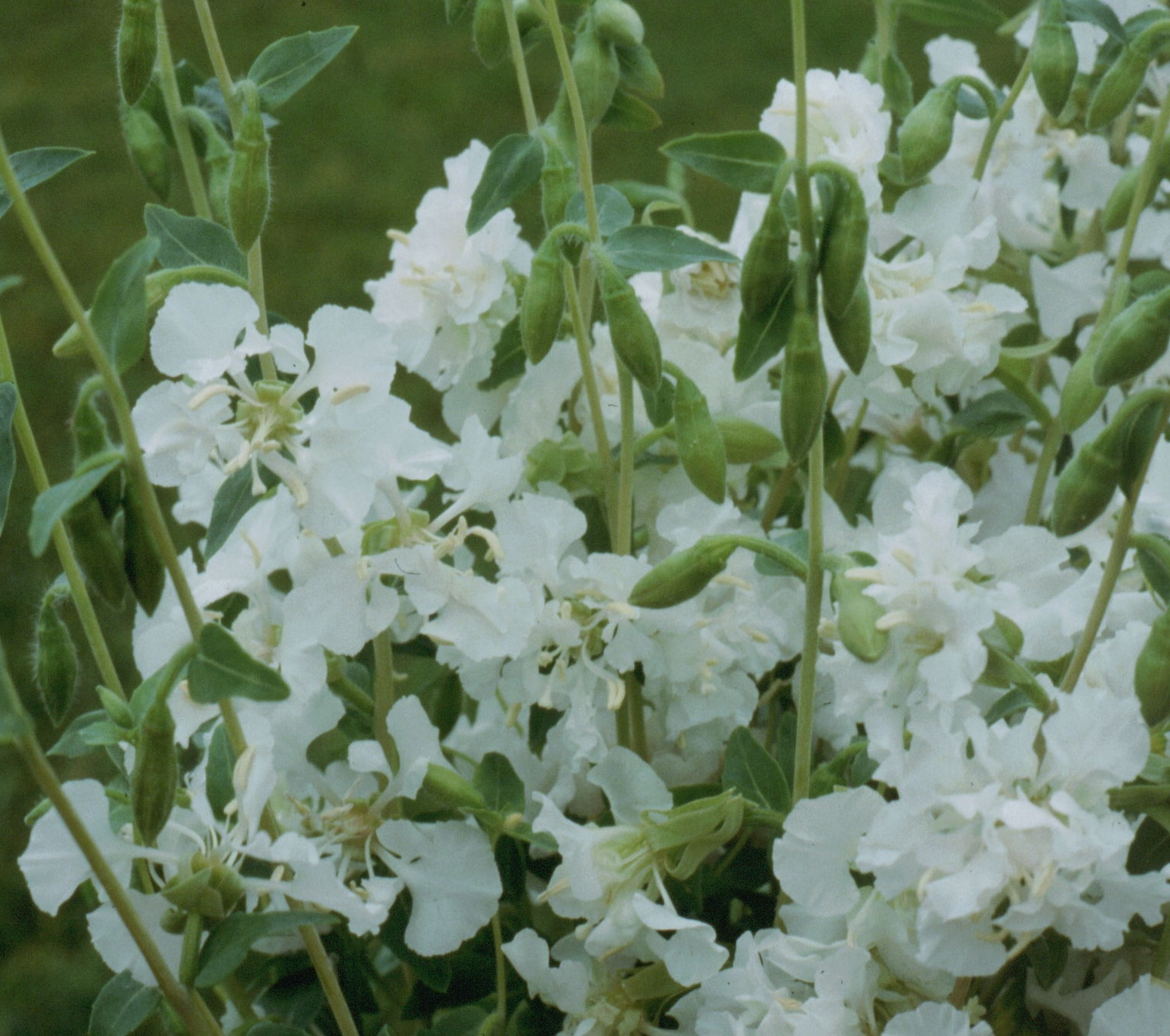
'Albatross'

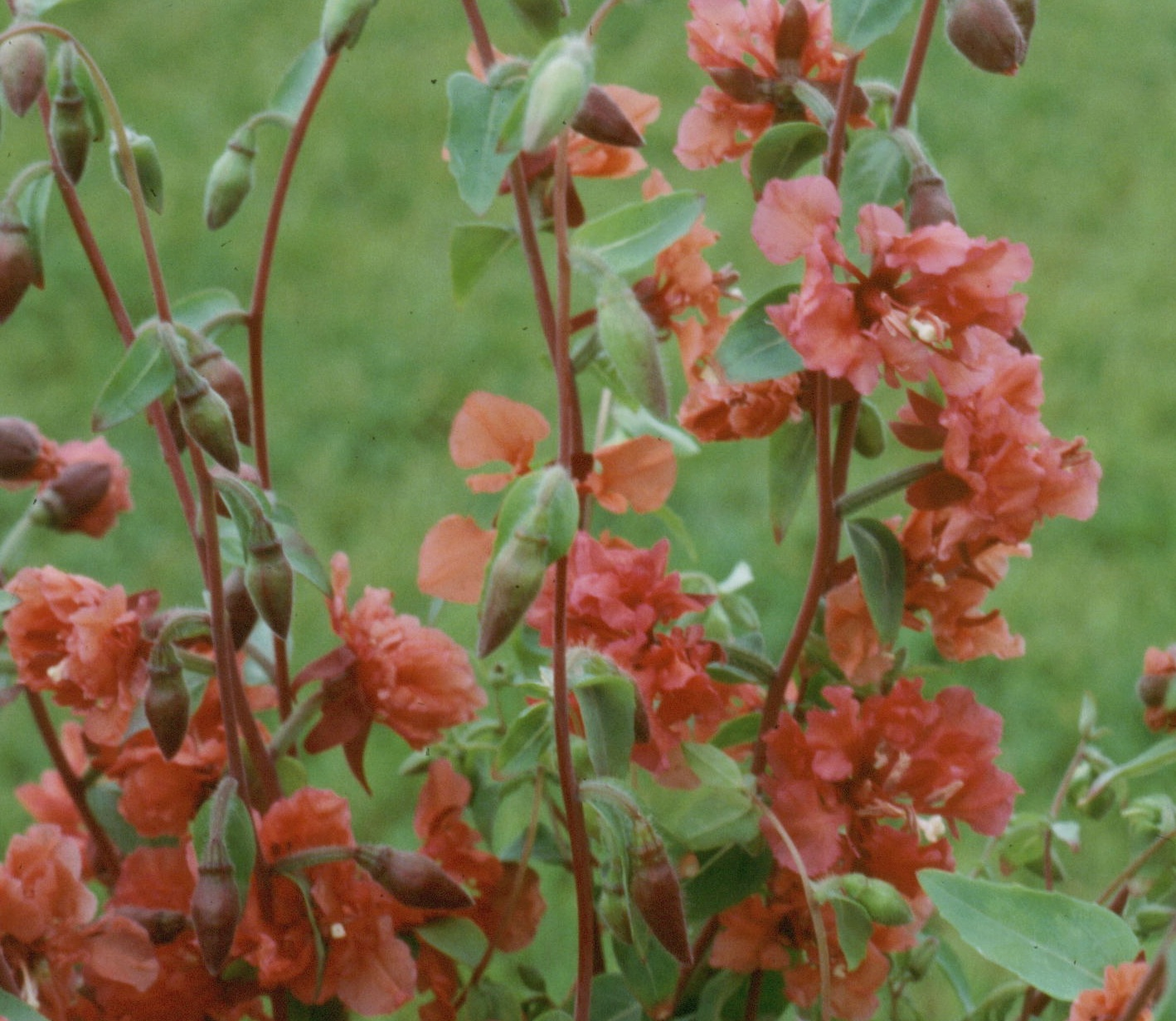
'Firebrand'

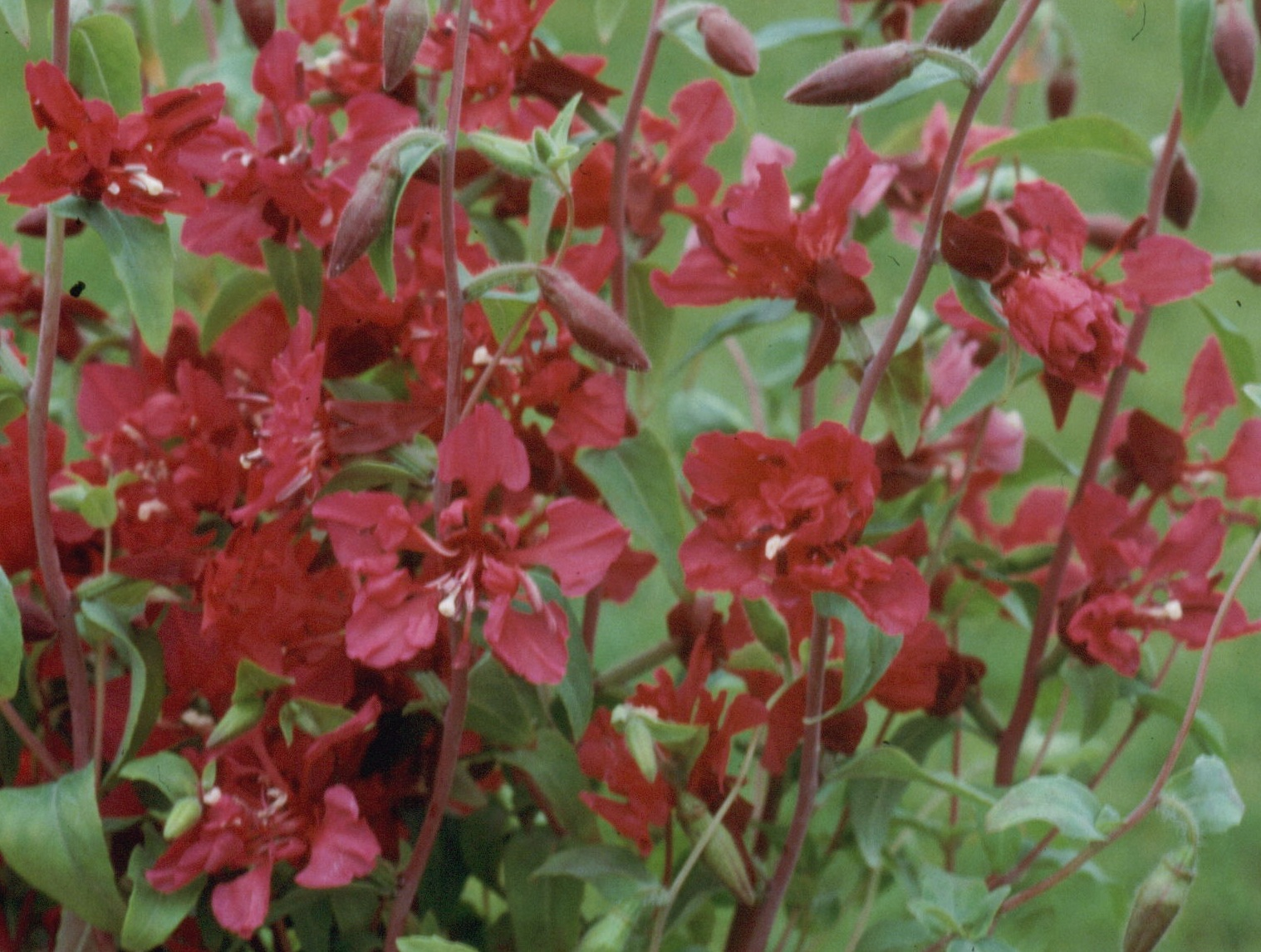
'Gloriosa'

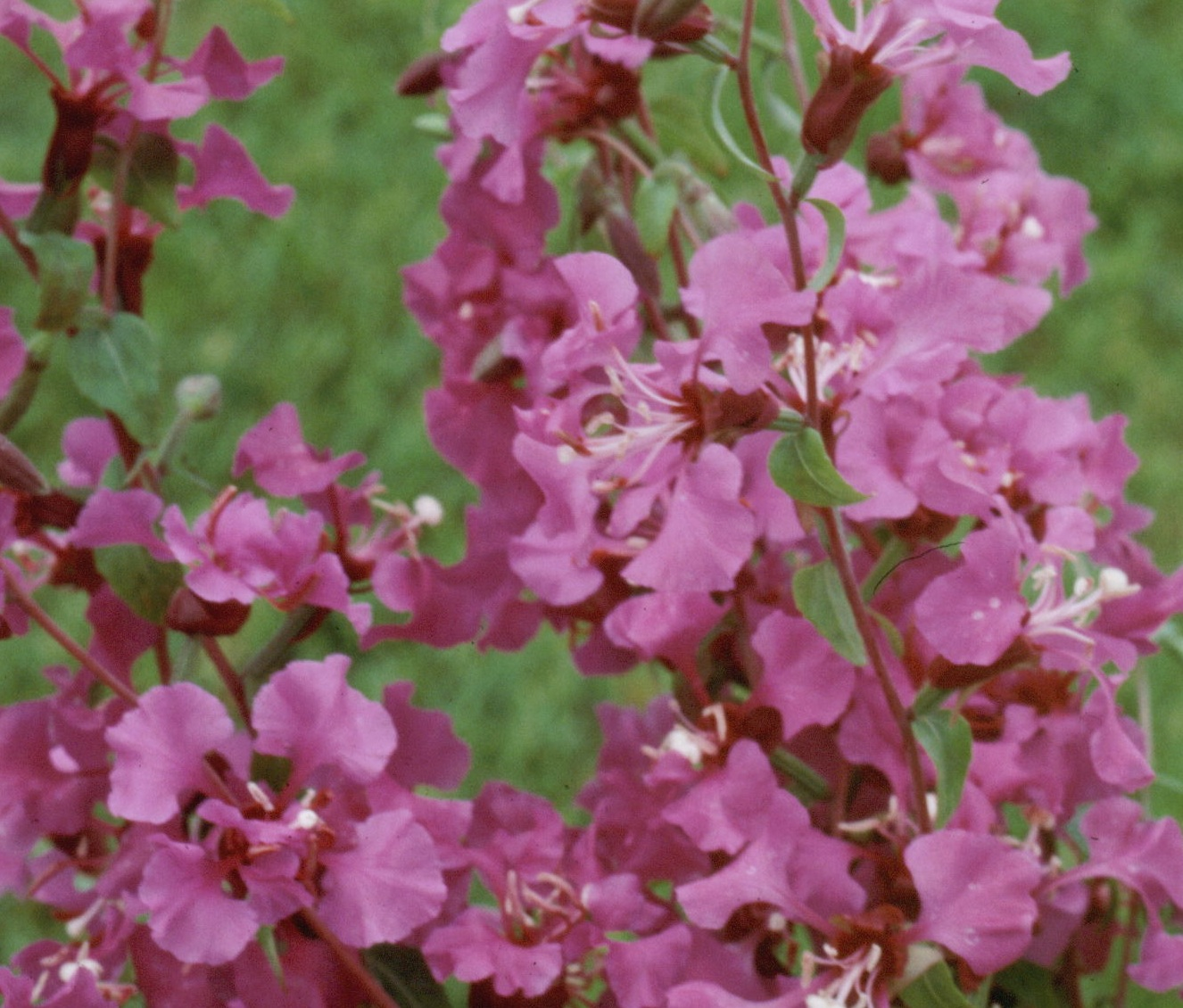
'Lilac'

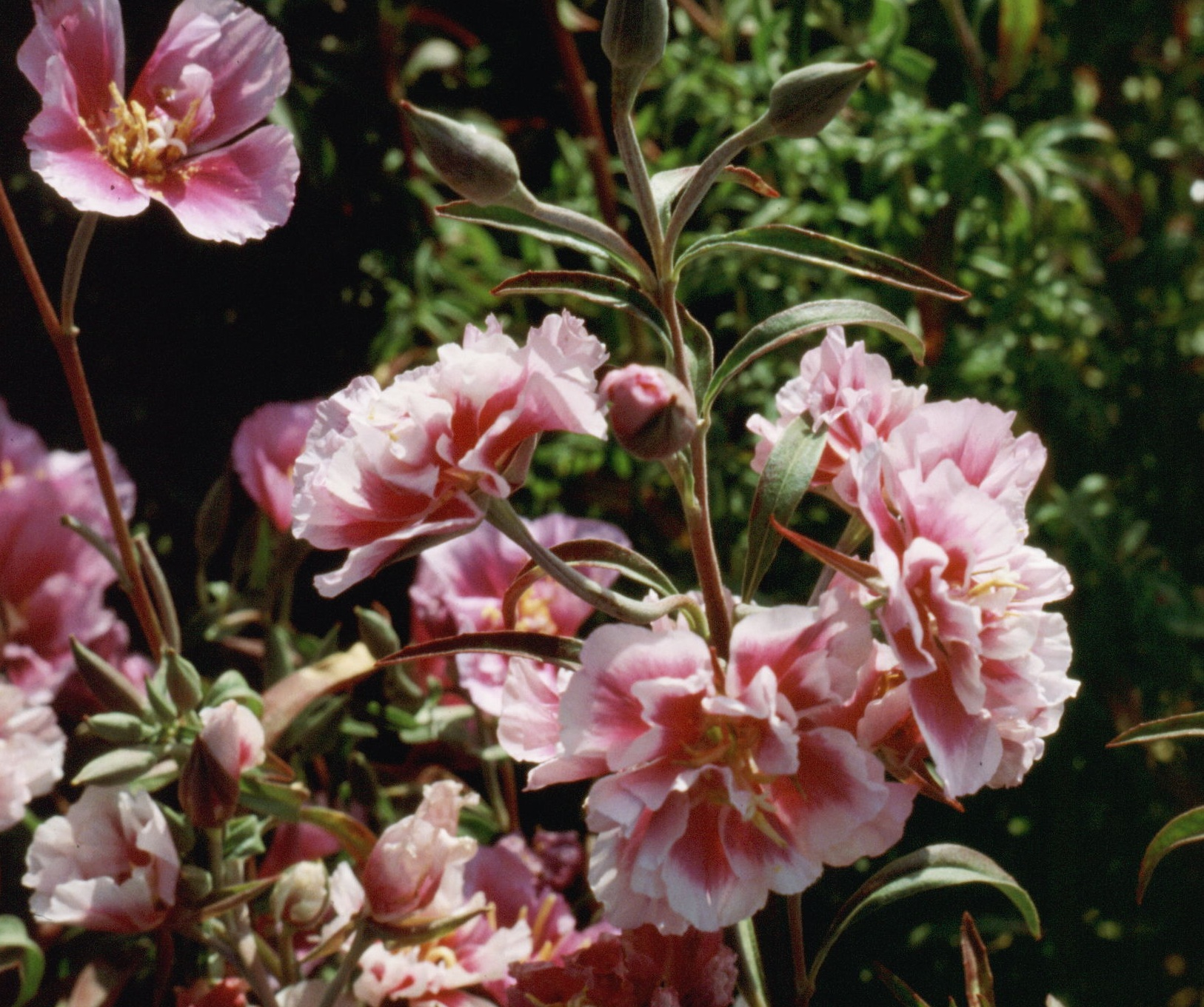
'Tall Double Mix'
