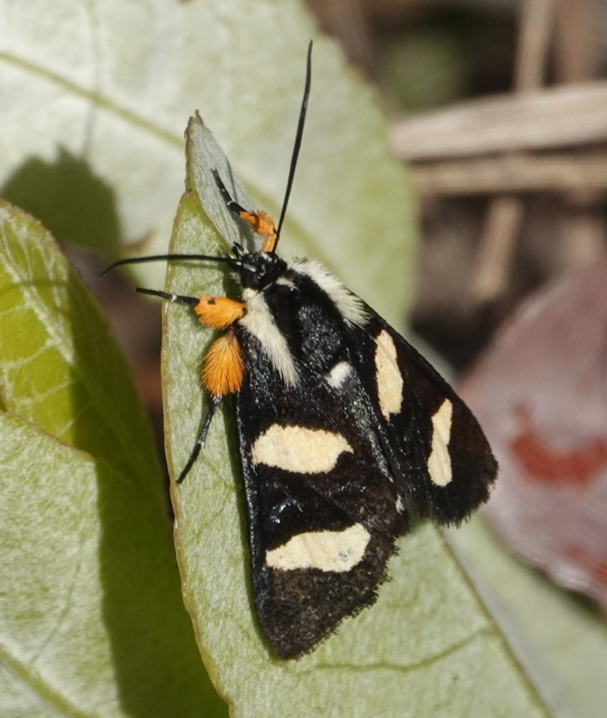

Scientific classification
- Domain: Eukaryota
- Kingdom: Animalia
- Phylum: Arthropoda
- Class: Insecta
- Order: Lepidoptera
- Superfamily: Noctuoidea
- Family: Noctuidae
- Genus: Alypia
- Species: A. wittfeldii

Binomial name
- Alypia wittfeldii H. Edwards, 1883

= Alypia wittfeldii =

Wittfeld's forester

Species of moth

Alypia wittfeldii, or Wittfeld's forester, is a moth of the family Noctuidae. The species was first described by Henry Edwards in 1883. It is found in the United States in almost all of Florida (except the western panhandle of the state), coastal Georgia, and South Carolina.

The length of the forewings is 13–14 mm. Adults are on wing from January to April in southern Florida and mostly in April along the coasts of South Carolina and Georgia.
