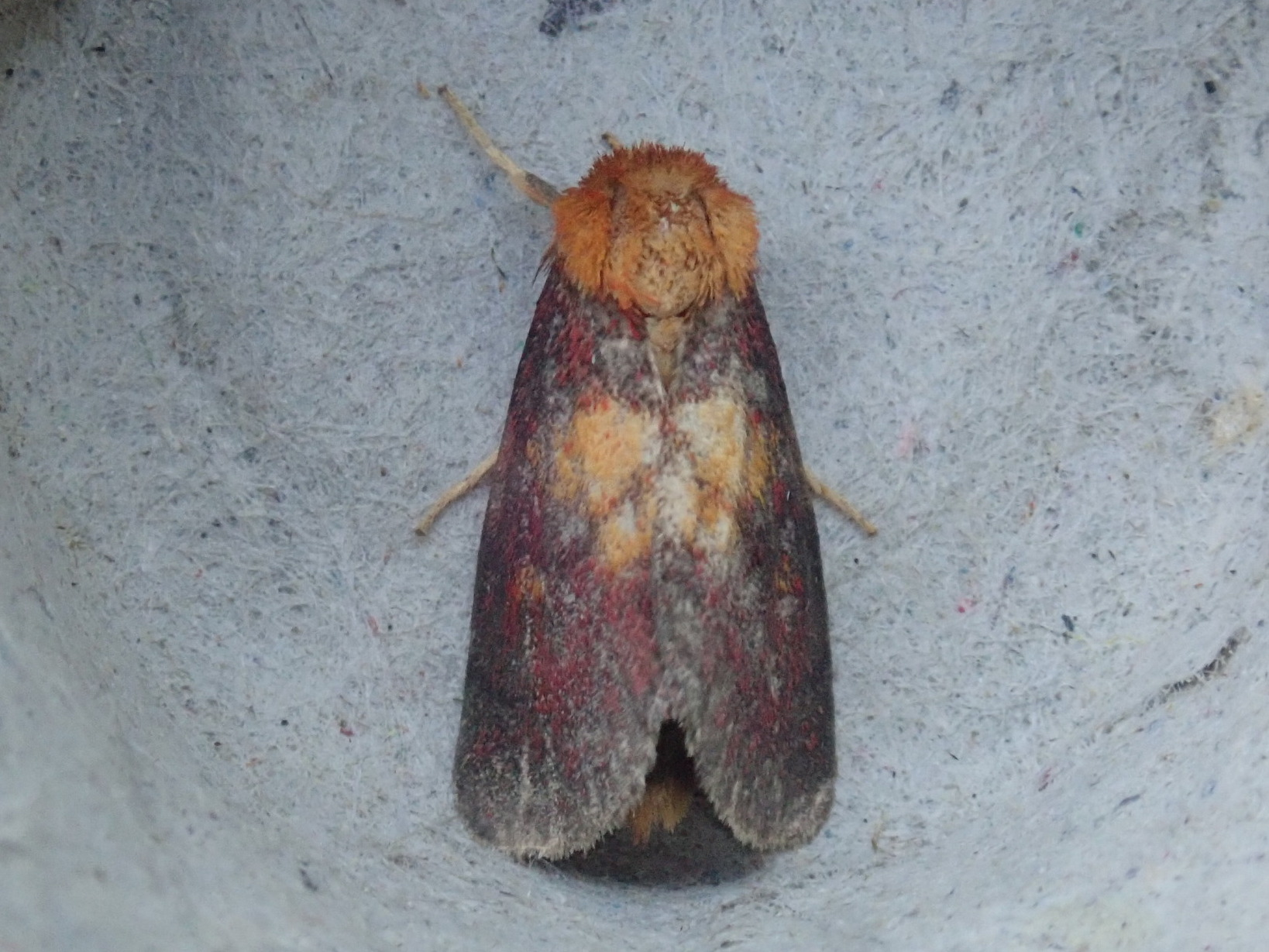

Scientific classification
- Kingdom: Animalia
- Phylum: Arthropoda
- Class: Insecta
- Order: Lepidoptera
- Superfamily: Noctuoidea
- Family: Noctuidae
- Genus: Exyra
- Species: E. fax

Binomial name
- Exyra fax Grote, 1873

Synonyms
- Xanthoptera fax; Exyra rolandiana (Grote, 1875)

= Exyra fax =

Species of moth

Exyra fax, the pitcher plant moth, is a moth of the family Noctuidae. It is mainly found on the Atlantic Coastal Plain and Great Lakes region of eastern North America (from Manitoba through Michigan to Nova Scotia and Maine south to Georgia. The species is listed as threatened in Connecticut.

The species is in decline due to disruption of bog hydrology and application of biocides.

The wingspan is 20–22 mm (0.79–0.87 in). Adults are on wing from June to August.

The larvae feed on Sarracenia purpurea.
