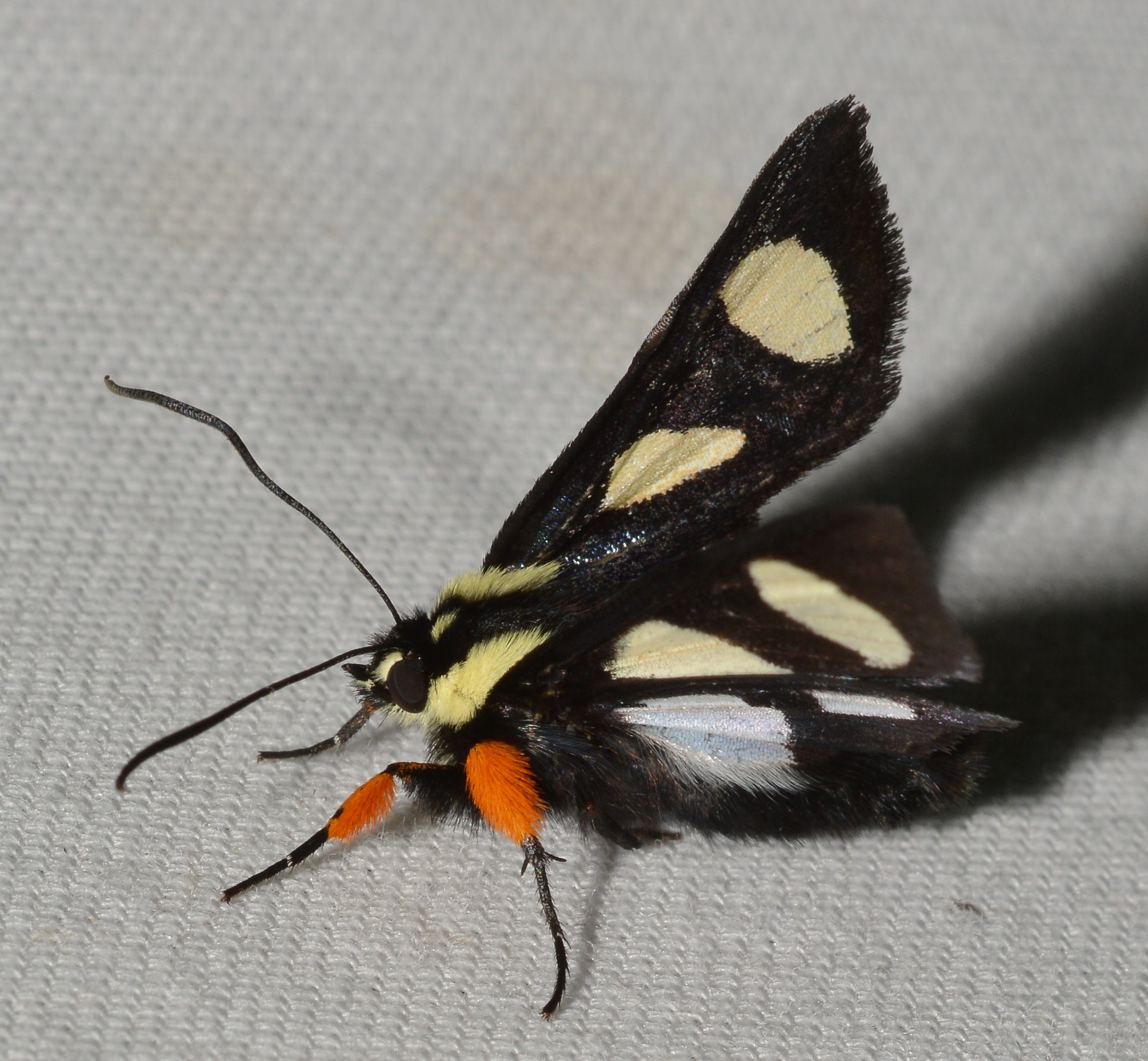
- Adult Alypia octomaculata

Scientific classification
- Kingdom: Animalia
- Phylum: Arthropoda
- Clade: Pancrustacea
- Class: Insecta
- Order: Lepidoptera
- Superfamily: Noctuoidea
- Family: Noctuidae
- Genus: Alypia
- Species: A. octomaculata

Binomial name
- Alypia octomaculata Fabricius, 1775

Synonyms
- Sesia 8-maculata; Sesia octomaculata Fabricius, 1775; Phalaena albomaculata Stoll, 1782; Phalaena bimaculata Gmelin, 1790; Alypia octomaculalis Hübner, 1818; Alypia quadriguttalis Hübner, 1818; Alypia dipsaci Grote & Robinson, 1868; Alypia matuta H. Edwards, 1883

= Alypia octomaculata =

Eight-spotted forester

Species of moth

Alypia octomaculata, the eight-spotted forester, is a moth of the family Noctuidae, first described by Johan Christian Fabricius in 1775. It is native to Canada, but can be found today throughout Northern America, ranging between Nova Scotia to Florida and South Dakota to Texas. Their habitats are rather specific: they make home where wooded areas meet open fields.

== Description ==
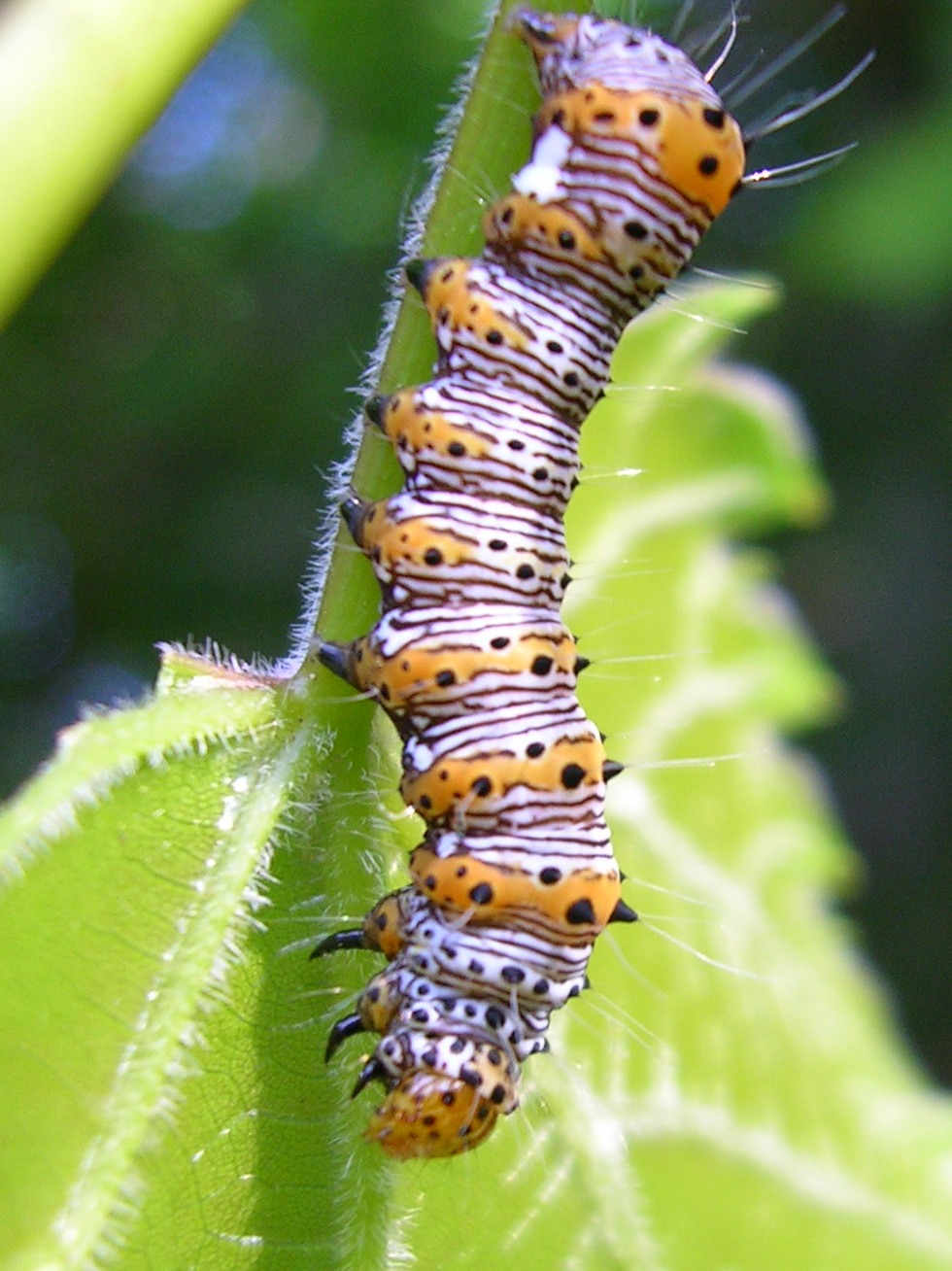
Mature A. octomaculata larva

Full grown larvae reach up to 25.4–38 millimetres (1–1 1/2 in). The moth is overall black, with two spots on each wing (a total of eight spots). Its forewing ranges between shades of white, cream, or yellow. Their wingspan is around 30–37 millimetres (1.2–1.5 in). These moths are active during the day and night, and are often mistaken as butterflies.

=== Larvae ===
The larvae feed on the underside of leaves and stems of grapevines, peppervines, and Virginia creepers. A. octomaculata larvae are considered somewhat of a pest in commercial and decorative vineyards.

When threatened, its first line of defense is to vomit a foul orange-tinted liquid. It escapes by falling off of its perch, still attached to it by the silk thread excreted from its mouth.

Larvae who are still around during the fall like to spin their soft-walled cocoon into partially decayed material such as wood, soil, and even trash. Some mature caterpillars even die when they are not given an opportunity to bore themselves into something pulpy and suitable.

=== Pupae ===
Like many other moths, A. octomaculata have the ability to remain in diapause, a dormant state in which their development is delayed, up to as far as 4 years long on record. The conditions of when they decide to hatch are unknown.

=== Adults ===
A. octomaculata are univoltine in the more northern part of their range, flying late spring from April to June to produce one generation. In warmer climates there may be two annual broods and even attempts at three. The matured adults feed on nectar from flowers of herbaceous plants. When their initial brood peaks, during March, the adults fly to flowers such as those of sweetleaf.

== Gallery ==
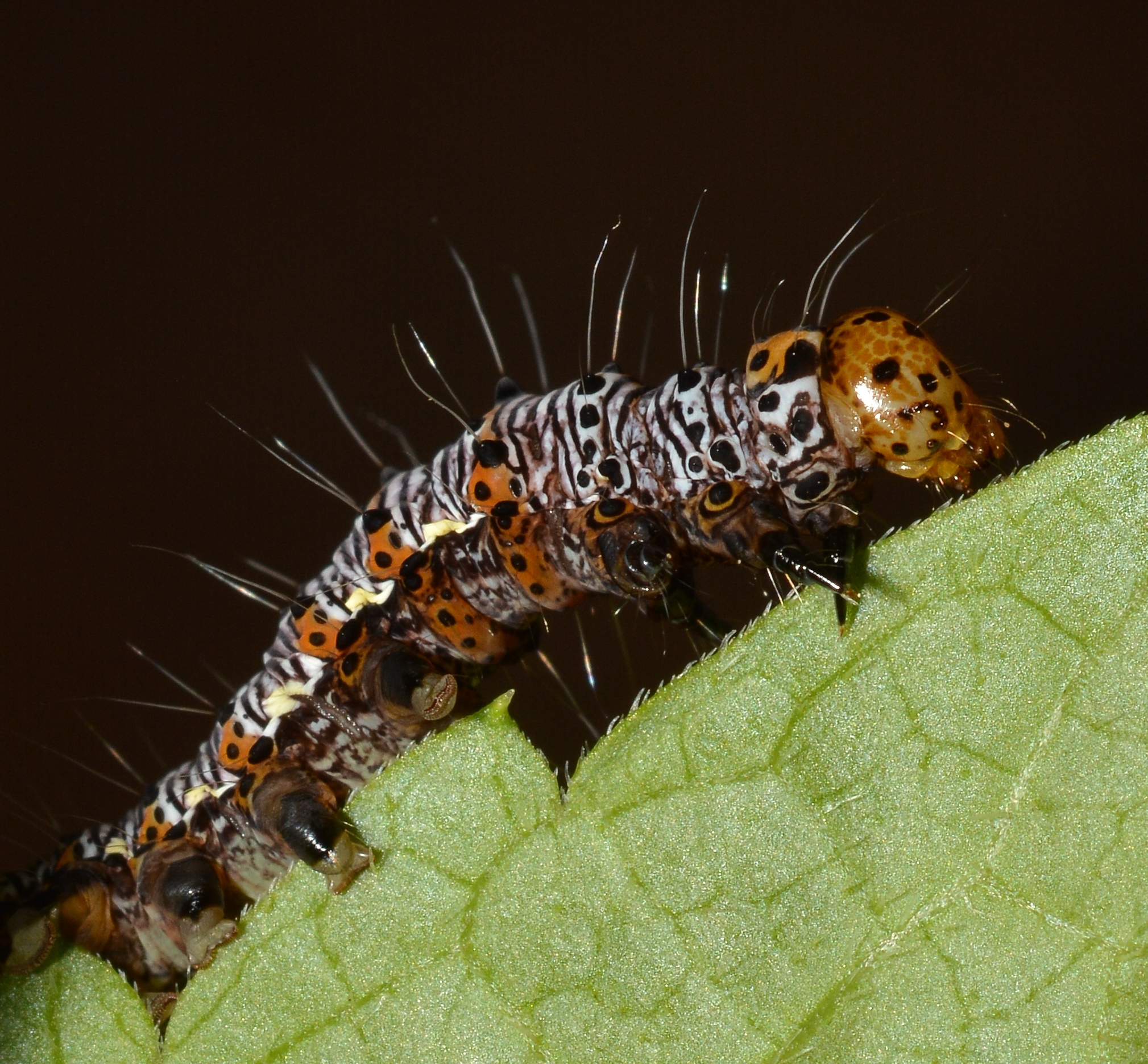
Larva

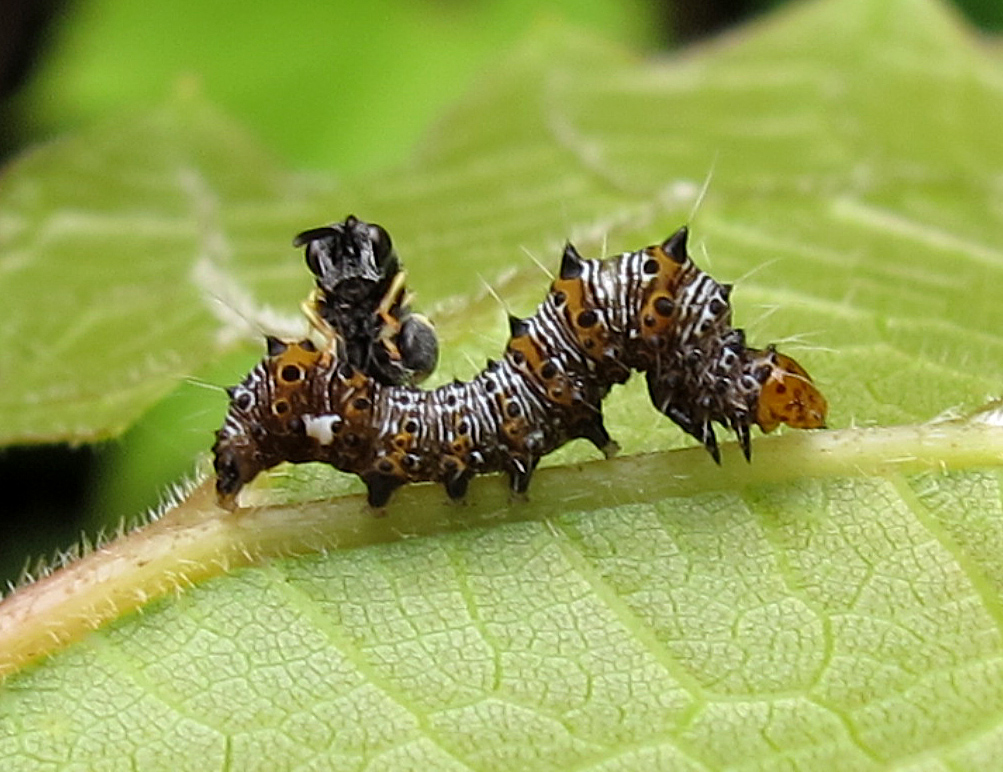
A. octomaculata being parasitized

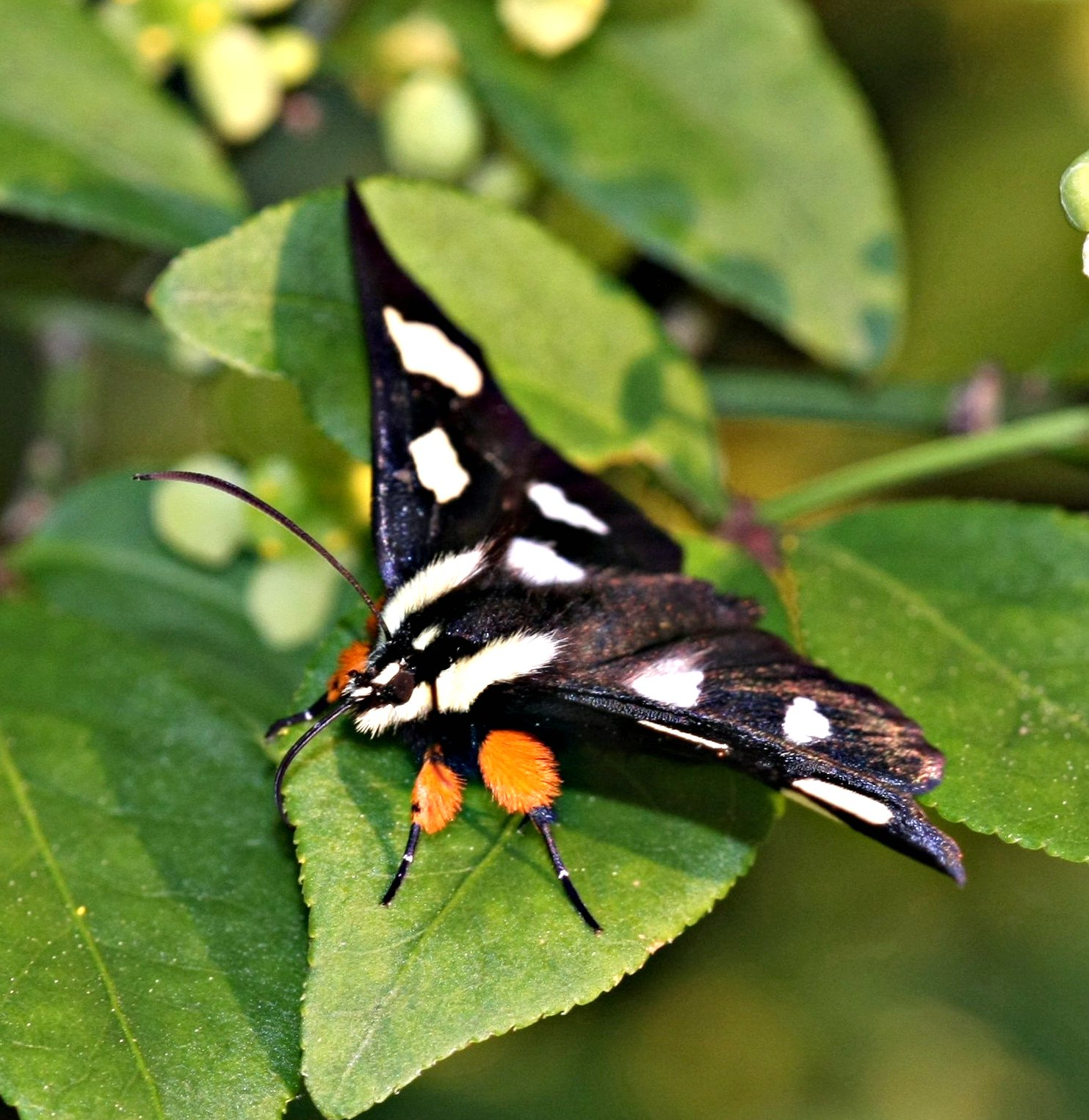
Adult

== Subspecies ==
- Alypia octomaculata octomaculata (Fabricuis, 1775)
- Alypia octomaculata matuta (H. Edwards, 1883)
