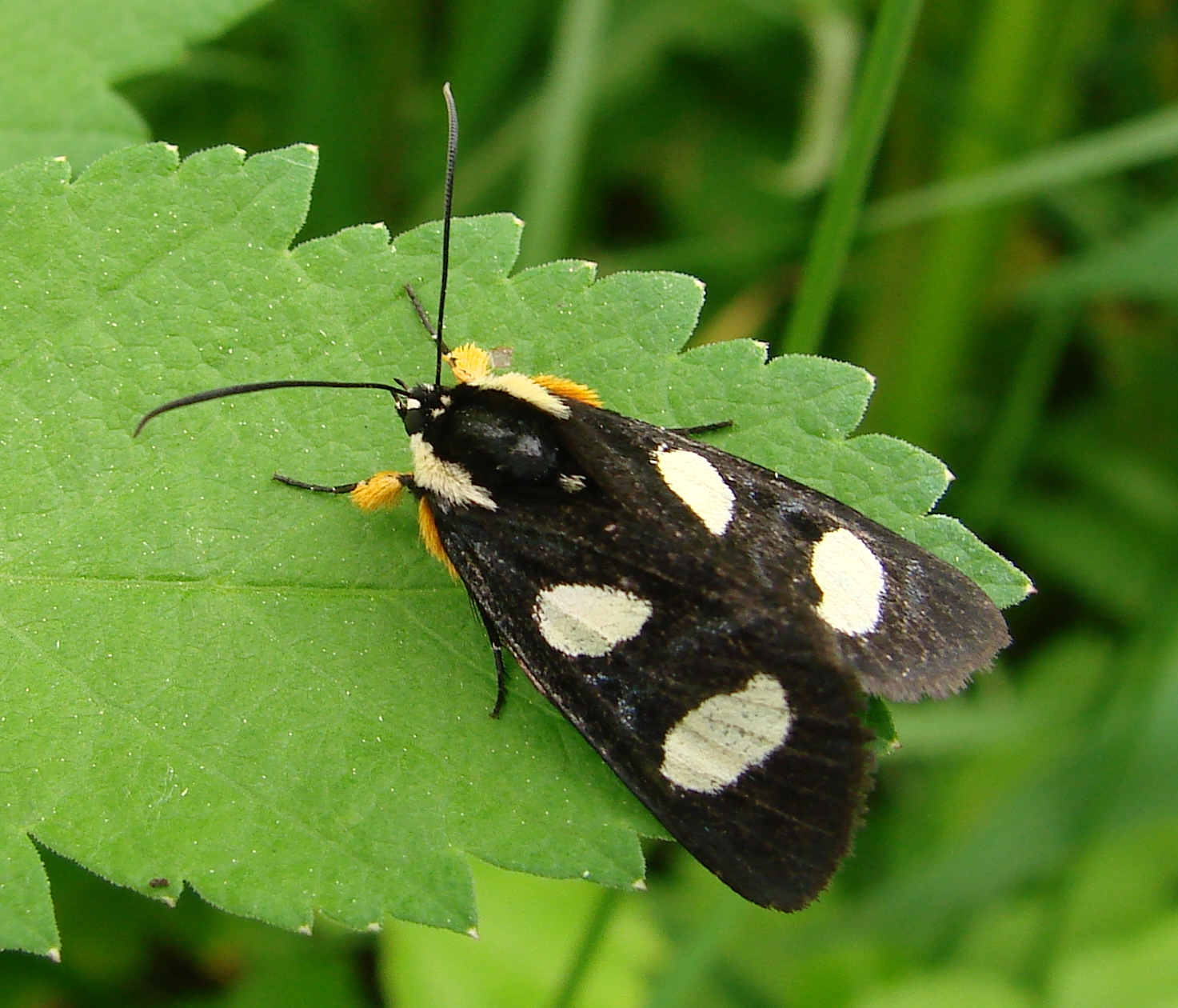
- Eight-spotted forester (A. octomaculata)

Scientific classification
- Domain: Eukaryota
- Kingdom: Animalia
- Phylum: Arthropoda
- Class: Insecta
- Order: Lepidoptera
- Superfamily: Noctuoidea
- Family: Noctuidae
- Subfamily: Agaristinae
- Genus: Alypia; Hubner, 1818

Synonyms
- Leucosemia Ménétriés, 1857

= Alypia =

Genus of moths

Alypia is a genus of moths in the family Noctuidae.

The genus is native to North America. Moths of this genus are generally dark to black in color with yellowish or white spots. These moths feed on plants in the grape family.

== Species ==
Species include:

- Alypia langtoni Couper, 1865 – Langton's forester, fireweed caterpillar
- Alypia mariposa Grote & Robinson, 1868
- Alypia octomaculata (Fabricius, 1775) – eight-spotted forester
- Alypia ridingsii Grote, 1864
- Alypia wittfeldii H. Edwards, 1883
