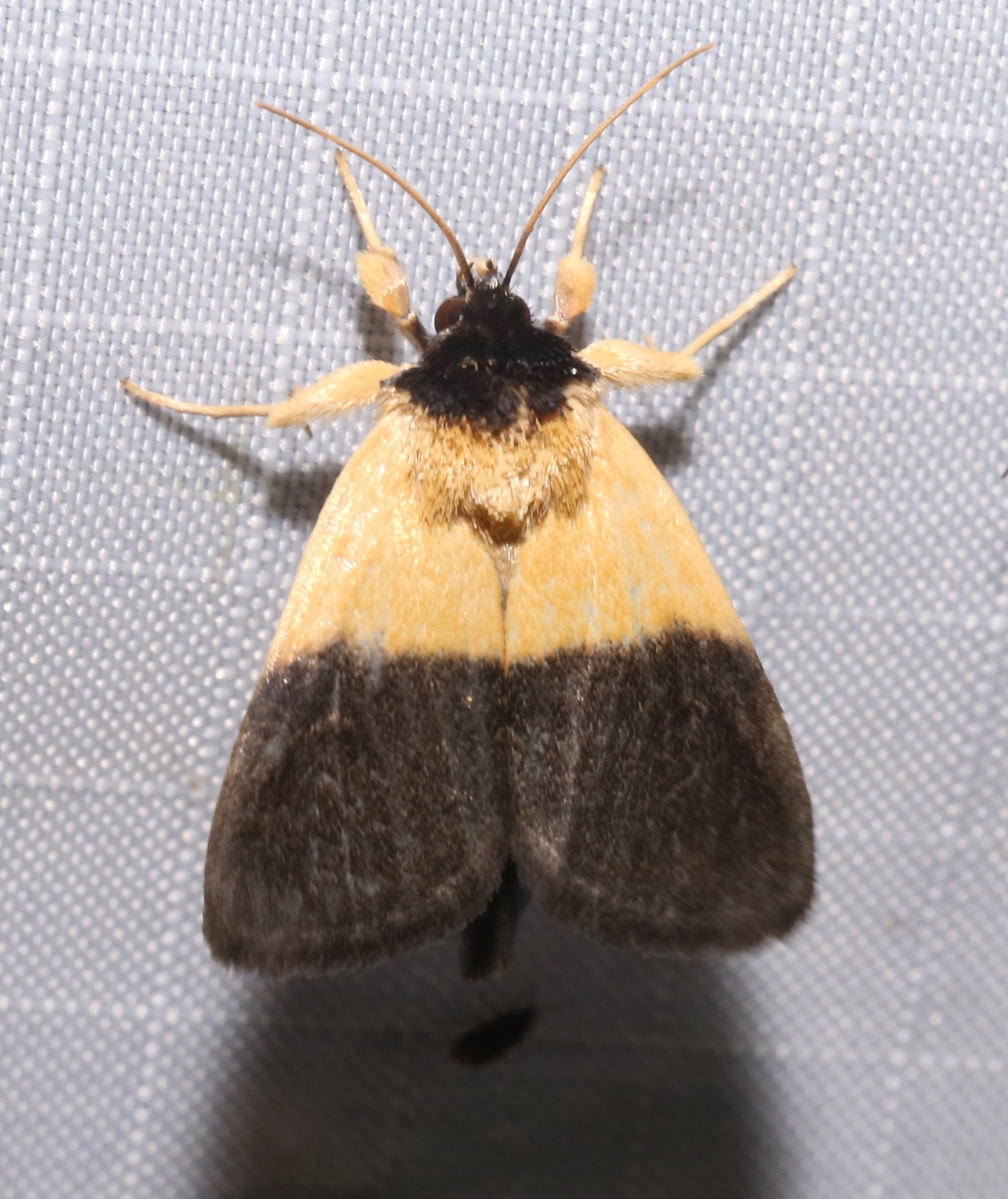
- Exyra semicrocea

Scientific classification
- Domain: Eukaryota
- Kingdom: Animalia
- Phylum: Arthropoda
- Class: Insecta
- Order: Lepidoptera
- Superfamily: Noctuoidea
- Family: Noctuidae
- Genus: Exyra; Grote, 1875

= Exyra =

Genus of moths

Exyra is a genus of moths of the family Noctuidae.

== Biology ==
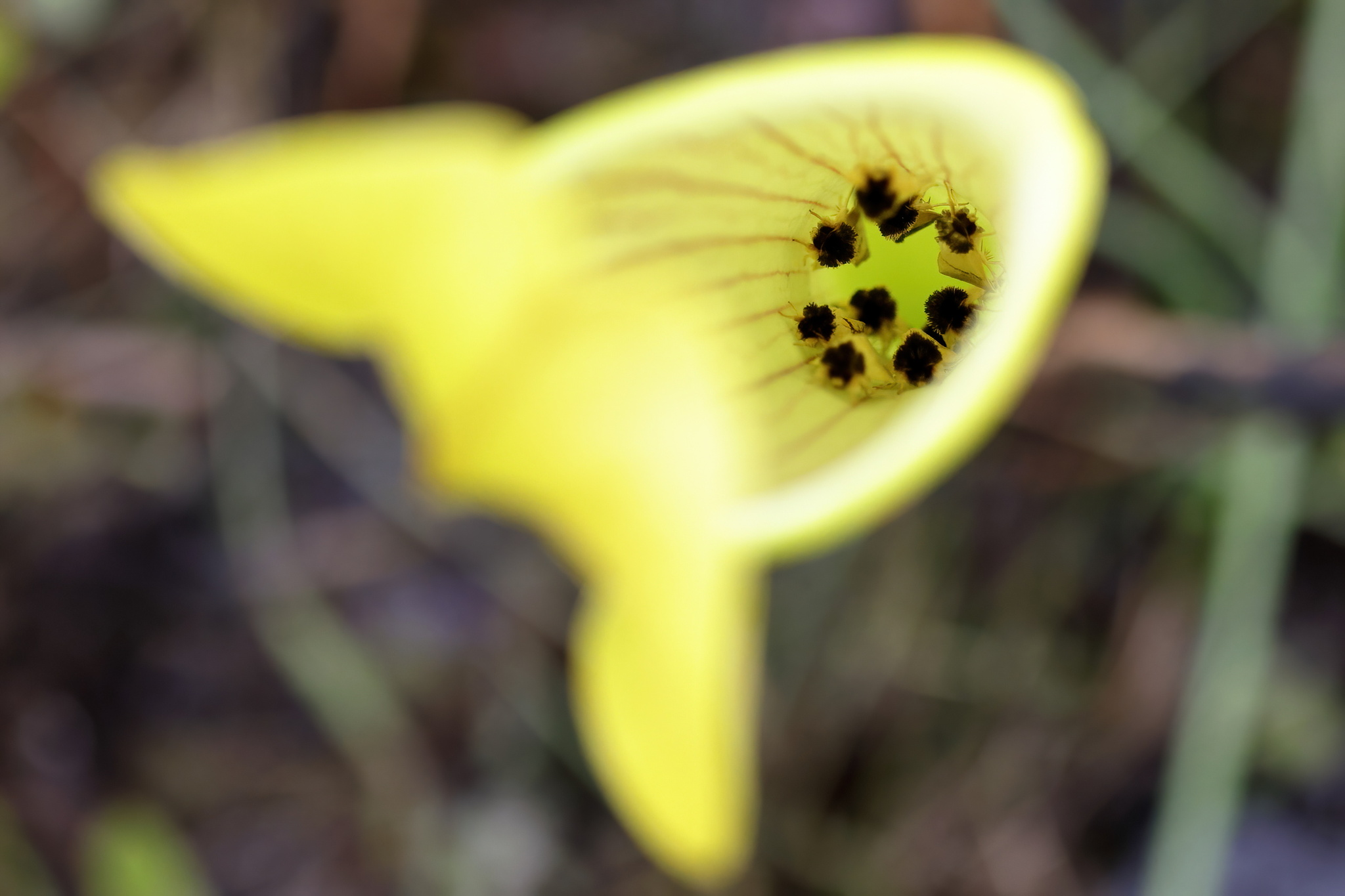
E. semicrocea inside a Sarracenia pitcher

Caterpillars of the genus Exyra feed only on Sarracenia (North American pitcher plants). E. fax feeds only on S. purpurea and E. ridingsii feeds only on S. flava, while E. semicrocea feeds on S. minor, S. rubra, S. alata, S. leucophylla, and less commonly on S. flava and S. psittacina.

== Species ==
Image	Species
	Exyra fax Grote, 1873
	Exyra ridingsii Riley, 1874
	Exyra semicrocea Guenée, 1852
