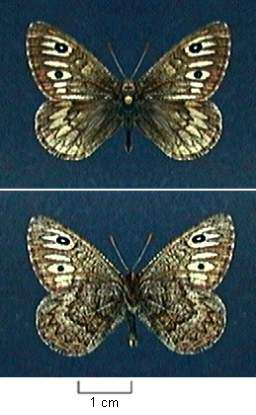
- Neominois ridingsii

Scientific classification
- Kingdom: Animalia
- Phylum: Arthropoda
- Clade: Pancrustacea
- Class: Insecta
- Order: Lepidoptera
- Family: Nymphalidae
- Tribe: Satyrini
- Genus: Neominois; Scudder, 1875

= Neominois =

Genus of butterflies

Neominois is a genus of butterflies from the subfamily Satyrinae in the family Nymphalidae.

== Species ==
- Neominois carmen A. Warren, Austin, Llorente, Luis & Vargas, 2008 – Joboni satyr
- Neominois pseudochazaroides Durden, 2008
- Neominois ridingsii (Edwards, 1865) – Ridings' satyr
