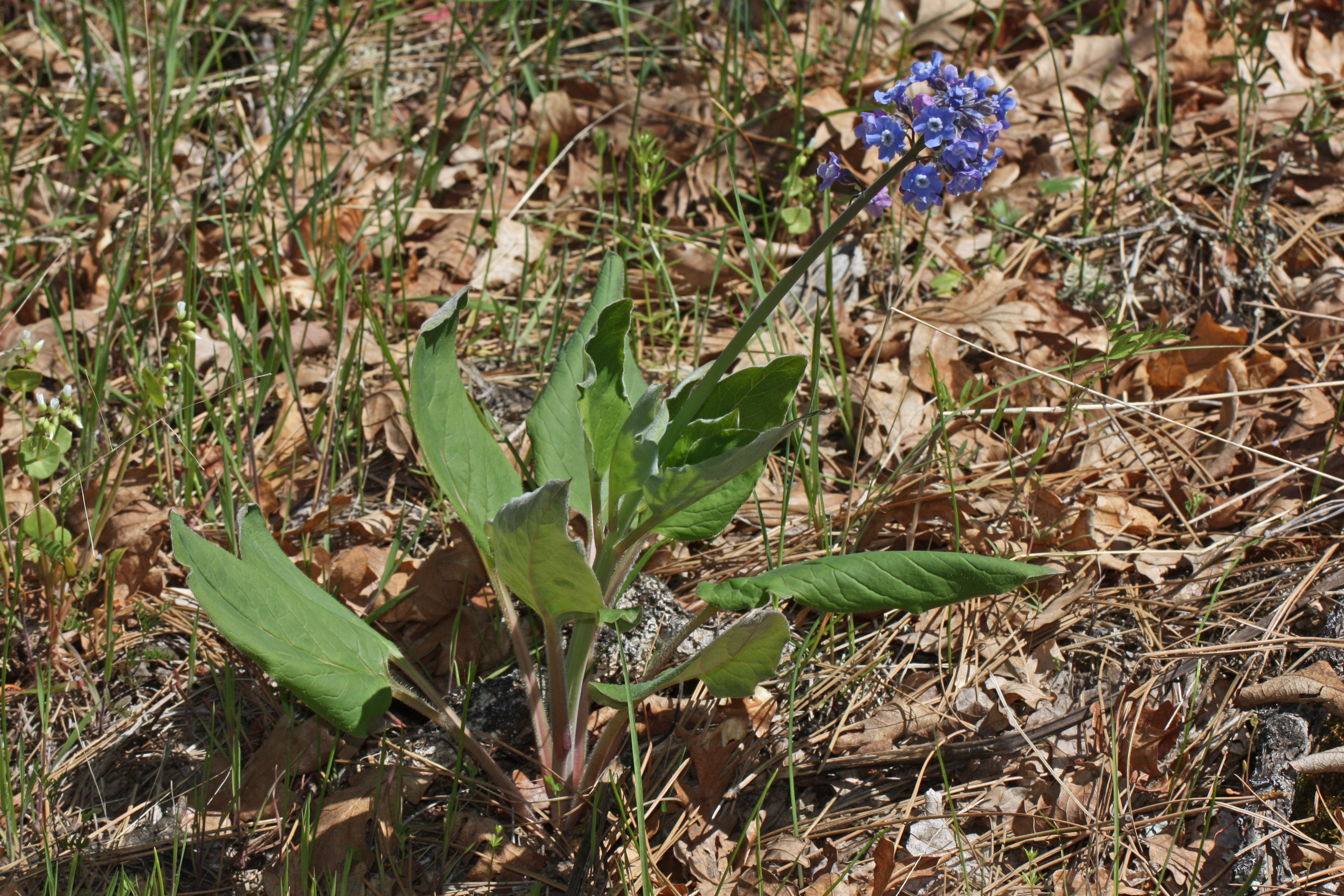

Scientific classification
- Kingdom: Plantae
- Clade: Tracheophytes
- Clade: Angiosperms
- Clade: Eudicots
- Clade: Asterids
- Order: Boraginales
- Family: Boraginaceae
- Genus: Adelinia; J.I.Cohen
- Species: A. grande

Binomial name
- Adelinia grande (Dougl. ex Lehm.) J.I.Cohen

Synonyms
- Cynoglossum grande Douglas ex Lehm.; Cynoglossum austiniae Eastw.; Cynoglossum grande var. laeve (A.Gray) A.Gray; Cynoglossum laeve A.Gray

= Adelinia =

Genus of flowering plants

Adelinia grandis, previously known as Cynoglossum grande, is a species of flowering plant commonly known as hound's tongue in the borage family. It is the only species in the genus Adelinia.

Producing panicles of blue flowers, the species is native to western North America and was used medicinally by Native Americans to treat burns and stomach aches.

== Description ==
It is a perennial herb producing an erect stem up to 80 centimetres (31 in) tall from a taproot. The leaves are mostly located around the base of the plant, each with an oval blade up to 15 cm (6 in) long held on a petiole, which near the base are also up to 15 cm long.

The inflorescence is a panicle of flowers on individual pedicels. Each five-lobed flower is bright to deep blue with white appendages at the center. It is 1 to 1.5 cm (3/8 to 5/8 in) wide. The fruit is an array of four slightly bristly nutlets.

== Etymology ==
The genus name of Adelinia honours Adeline Etta Cohen (b. 2014), daughter of American botanist James I. Cohen, who described the plant.

== Distribution and habitat ==
The species is native to western North America from British Columbia to California, where it grows in shady areas in woodland and chaparral. On the forest floor of California oak woodlands typical plant associates are Calochortus amabilis, C. luteus, and Delphinium variegatum.

== Uses ==
Native Americans made a preparation of the roots to treat burns and stomach aches.
