= Exyra ridingsii =

Scientific classification
- Kingdom: Animalia
- Phylum: Arthropoda
- Clade: Pancrustacea
- Class: Insecta
- Order: Lepidoptera
- Superfamily: Noctuoidea
- Family: Noctuidae
- Genus: Exyra
- Species: E. ridingsii

Binomial name
- Exyra ridingsii Riley, 1874

Synonyms
- Xanthoptera ridingsii; Xanthoptera nigrocaput; Exyra ridingsi

Species of moth

Exyra ridingsii is a moth of the family Noctuidae. It is found from North Carolina to Florida and Alabama. The species is named after James Ridings.

The wingspan is 24–31 mm. Adults are on wing in spring.

The larvae feed on Sarracenia flava and occasionally on Sarracenia minor.
