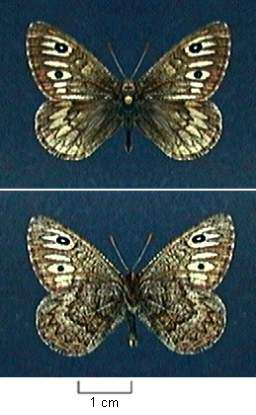

Scientific classification
- Kingdom: Animalia
- Phylum: Arthropoda
- Clade: Pancrustacea
- Class: Insecta
- Order: Lepidoptera
- Family: Nymphalidae
- Genus: Neominois
- Species: N. ridingsii

Binomial name
- Neominois ridingsii (W.H. Edwards, 1865)

Synonyms
- Satyrus ridingsii W.H. Edwards, 1865; Hipparchia (Neominois) ridingsii wyomingo Scott, 1998; Chionobas stretchii W.H. Edwards, 1870; Neominois dionysus Scudder, 1878; Satyrus ashtaroth Strecker, [1878]

= Neominois ridingsii =

Species of butterfly

Neominois ridingsii, or Ridings' satyr, is a species of butterfly in the family Nymphalidae. It is found from southern Alberta, Saskatchewan and Manitoba south to the Guadalupe and Catron counties of New Mexico, and west to the central Sierra Nevada of California and central Oregon. The habitat consists of short-grass prairie, intermountain areas and grasslands with some areas of bare soil.

The larvae feed on Bouteloua gracilis. Third- and fourth-instar larvae overwinter.

The species is named after James Ridings.

== Subspecies ==
- Neominois ridingsii ridingsii (Colorado)
- Neominois ridingsii coloalbiterra Garhart & M. Fisher, 2008 (Colorado: Roan Cliffs)
- Neominois ridingsii curicata M. Fisher, Scott & Garhart, 2008 (Colorado: upper Gunnison River Valley)
- Neominois ridingsii minimus Austin, 1986 (southern Alberta east to south-western Manitoba, northern Montana and western North Dakota)
- Neominois ridingsii neomexicanus Austin, 1986 (south-central Arizona, New Mexico)
- Neominois ridingsii pallidus Austin, 1986 (Sierra Nevada in California and Nevada, from northern to central Oregon)
- Neominois ridingsii stretchii (W.H. Edwards, 1870) (western Wyoming to western Colorado and from Washington to south-eastern Oregon Nevada and northern Arizona)
- Neominois ridingsii wyomingo (Scott, 1998) (northern Colorado, Wyoming, Montana, Utah)
