= Neominois carmen =

Scientific classification
- Domain: Eukaryota
- Kingdom: Animalia
- Phylum: Arthropoda
- Class: Insecta
- Order: Lepidoptera
- Family: Nymphalidae
- Genus: Neominois
- Species: N. carmen

Binomial name
- Neominois carmen A. Warren, Austin, Llorente, Luis & Vargas, 2008

Species of butterfly

Neominois carmen, the Joboni satyr, is a species of butterfly in the family Nymphalidae. It is found in north-eastern Mexico, at least from the Maderas del Carmen in north-western Coahuila, to the area west of Linares in southern Nuevo León. The habitat consists of open areas at the beginning of pine–oak woodland.

Adults have been recorded on wing from early June to late July, suggesting one generation per year.

The larvae probably feed on Piptochaetium and Bouteloua species.
