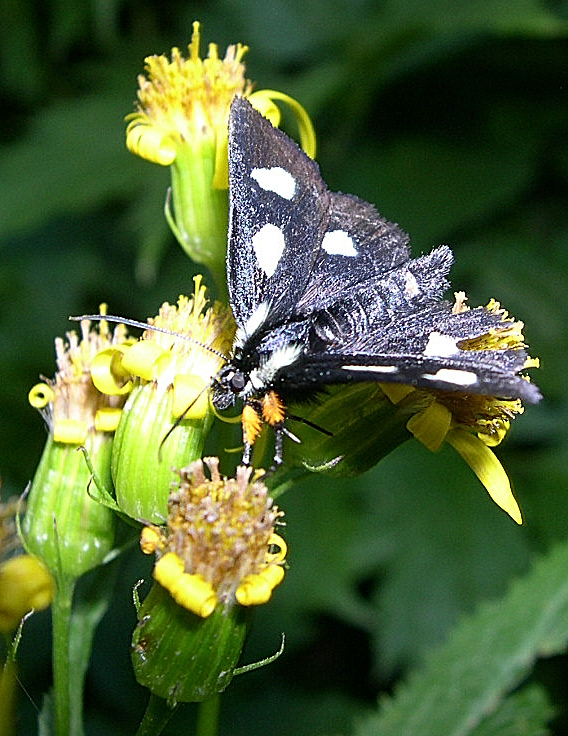
- Adult female

Scientific classification
- Kingdom: Animalia
- Phylum: Arthropoda
- Class: Insecta
- Order: Lepidoptera
- Superfamily: Noctuoidea
- Family: Noctuidae
- Genus: Alypia
- Species: A. langtoni

Binomial name
- Alypia langtoni Couper, 1865

Synonyms
- Alypia sacramenti Grote & Robinson, 1868; Agarista sacramenti Boisduval, 1869; Alypia hudsonia Barnes & McDunnough, 1917; Alypia brannani Stretch, 1872

= Alypia langtoni =

Langton's Forester

Species of moth

Alypia langtoni, the six-spotted forester or Langton's forester, is a moth of the family Noctuidae. The species was first described by William Couper in 1865. It is found in North America from Newfoundland to Alaska, south to Maine and Wisconsin in the east, south in the west to Colorado and California.

== Description ==
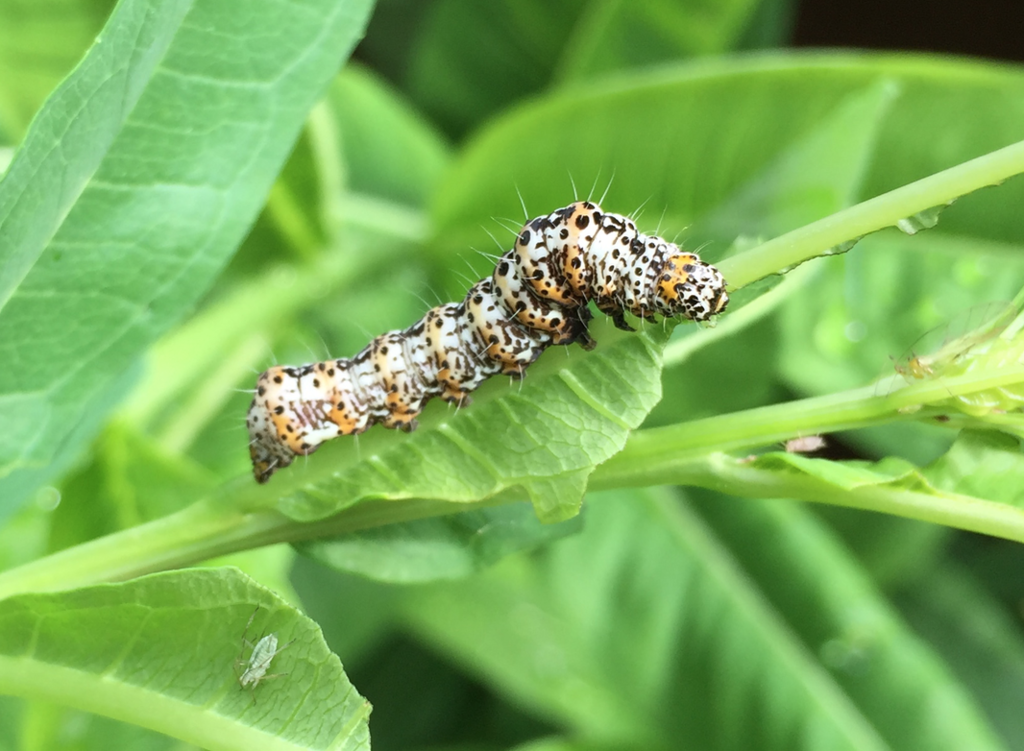
Larval stage

The moth exhibits sexual dimorphism. Males have eight spots in total while females have six. Their bodies are black with white spots on each wing. Their antennae are banded with white rings. The wingspan is about 30 mm. Adults are on wing from May to July in one generation depending on the location.

The larvae feed on Chamaenerion species such as the fireweed.
