= James Ridings =

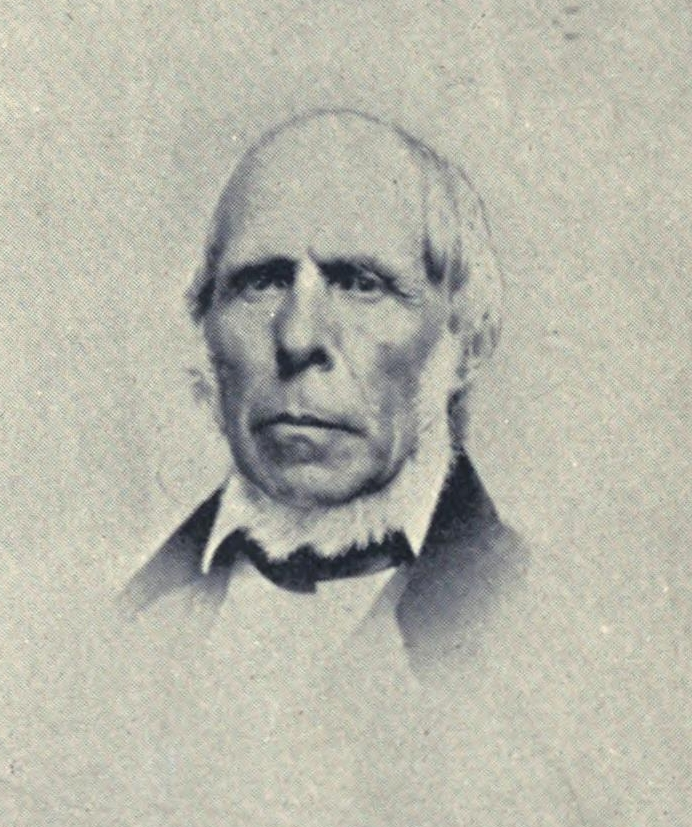

James Ridings (30 April 1803 – 29 July 1880, Philadelphia) was an English-American entomologist. He was a founding member of the Entomological Society of Philadelphia which later became the American Entomological Society. Several insect species including Alypia ridingsii, Exyra ridingsii, Nomada ridingsii, Neominois ridingsii, Trachusa ridingsii and Scaphinotus ridingsii are named after him.

== Biography ==
Ridings was born in Bolton-le-Moors, Lancashire, and was educated in a Parish school. He married and moved with his wife Diana from England to Philadelphia in 1830 where he was encouraged in his entomological quests by doctors Benjamin Rush and George McClellan in 1830. Professionally he was a carpenter, cabinet maker; and repairer of lathes and looms. He also provided medical treatments for common ailments to his neighbors. He collected specimens widely from at least 1849 and several new species were described from his specimens including Eresia carlota from Colorado (1865). He travelled to Kansas (1864), Georgia (1865), and Shenandoah Valley several times. He collected insects but had a special interest in the lepidoptera and hymenoptera. He later founded a natural history business on 1311 South Street dealing in insect specimens. He was a founding member of the Entomological Society of Philadelphia in 1859 along with Ezra Townsend Cresson. The office of the Society was on Wilt's Building right opposite his store. The meetings at this location was held here from 1862 to 1864 and sometimes also in another building owned by Riding on 518 S. 13th Street. The early insect boxes were made and provided by Ridings. In 1867 the Society renamed itself as the American Entomological Society. Ridings was married to Diana. Their daughter Mary Ann married E. T. Cresson. A son, James H. Ridings was born in Philadelphia on June 12, 1842, and also became an entomologist. He served as a recording secretary of the Entomological Society. He died on April 17, 1908, leaving his wife and daughter. He was interred at Mount Peace Cemetery.
