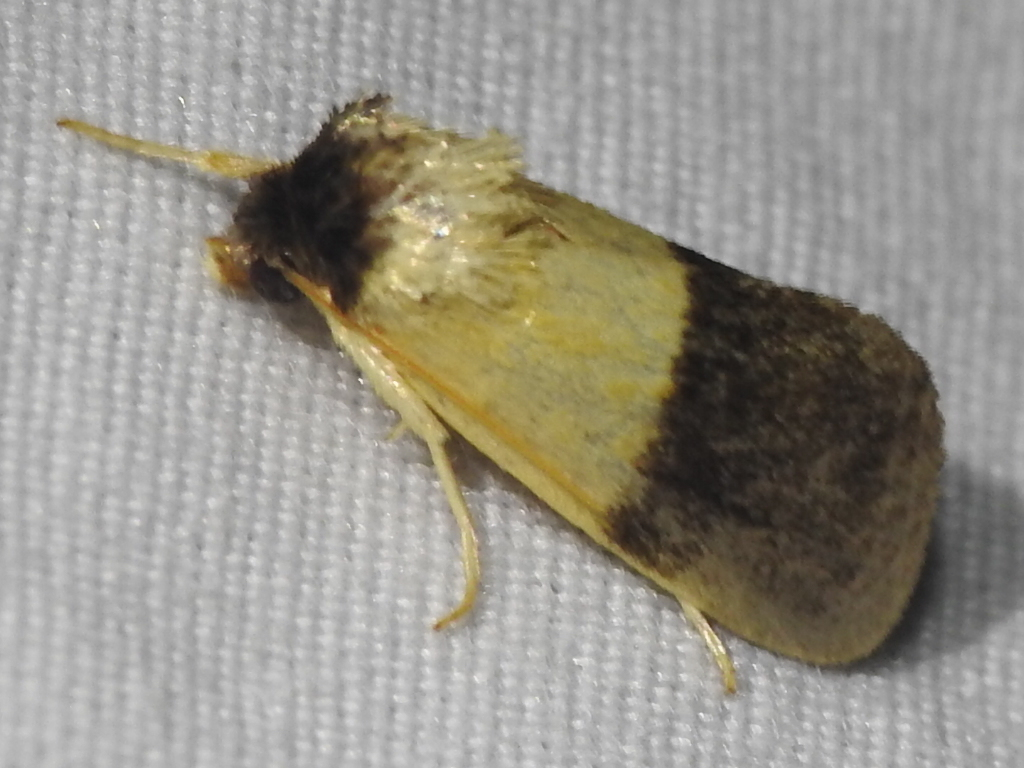

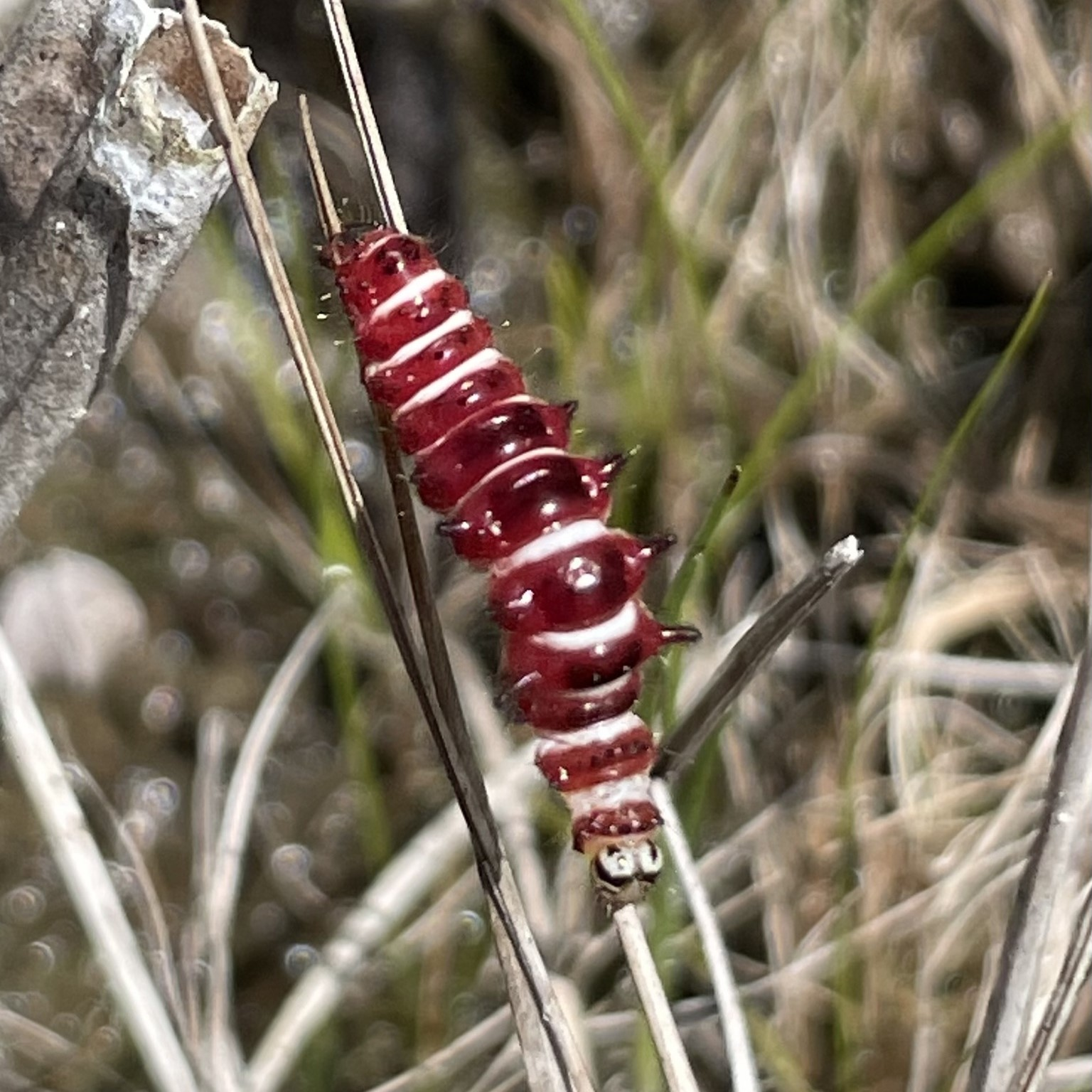
- Adult (top) and larva (bottom)

Scientific classification
- Kingdom: Animalia
- Phylum: Arthropoda
- Class: Insecta
- Order: Lepidoptera
- Superfamily: Noctuoidea
- Family: Noctuidae
- Genus: Exyra
- Species: E. semicrocea

Binomial name
- Exyra semicrocea Guenée, 1852

Synonyms
- Xanthoptera semicrocea; Exyra semicrocea ab. immaculata; Exyra semicrocea f. immaculata

= Exyra semicrocea =

Species of moth

Exyra semicrocea, the pitcher plant mining moth, is a species of moth in the family Noctuidae. It is found in the United States from northern North Carolina, south to Florida and west to Texas.

The wingspan is 16–26 mm.

The larvae feed on Sarracenia minor, Sarracenia rubra, Sarracenia alata, Sarracenia leucophylla and Sarracenia psittacina.

== Gallery ==
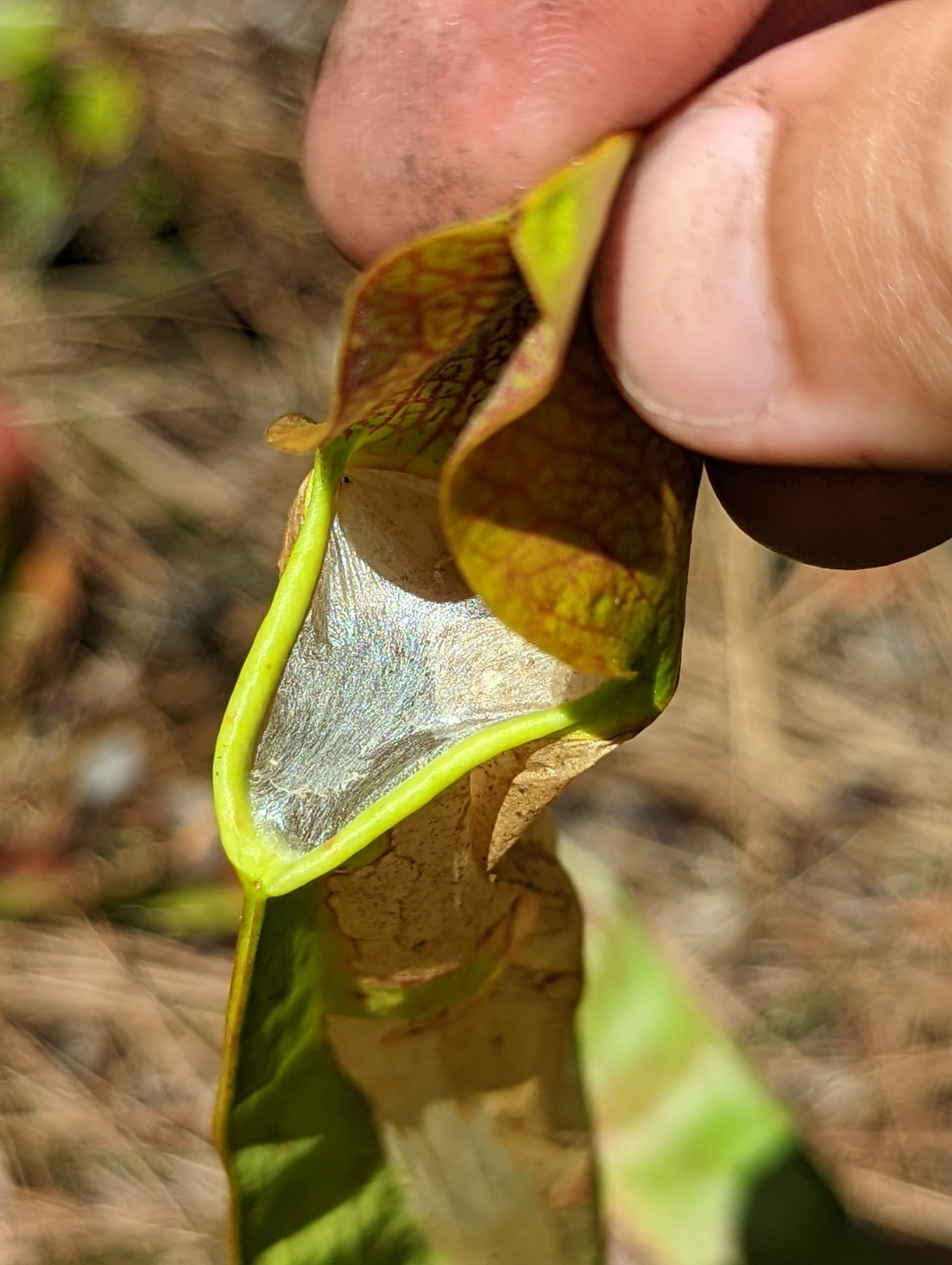
Larvae's silk covering the mouth of an S. minor pitcher

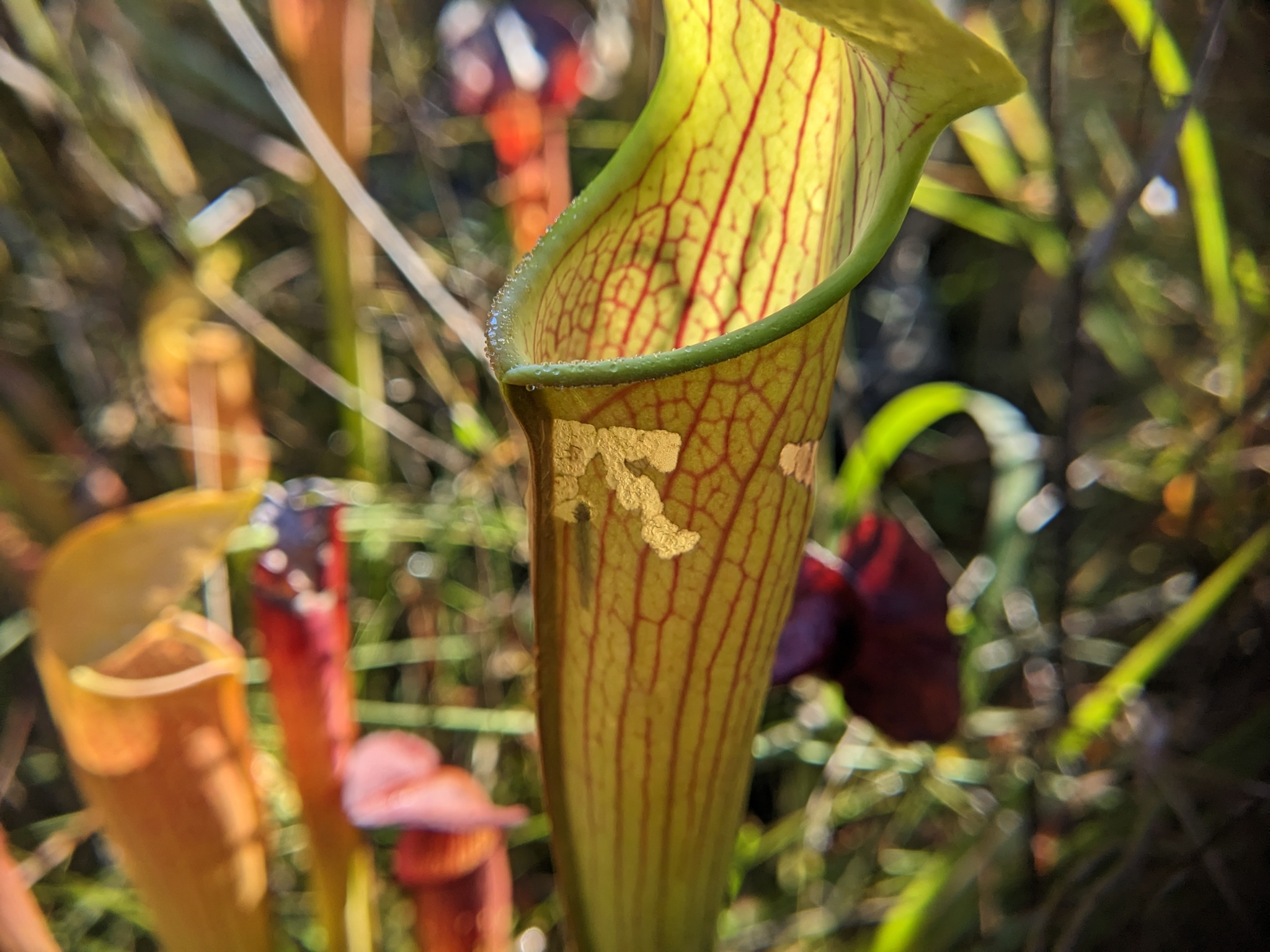
Larval damage of an S. alata pitcher

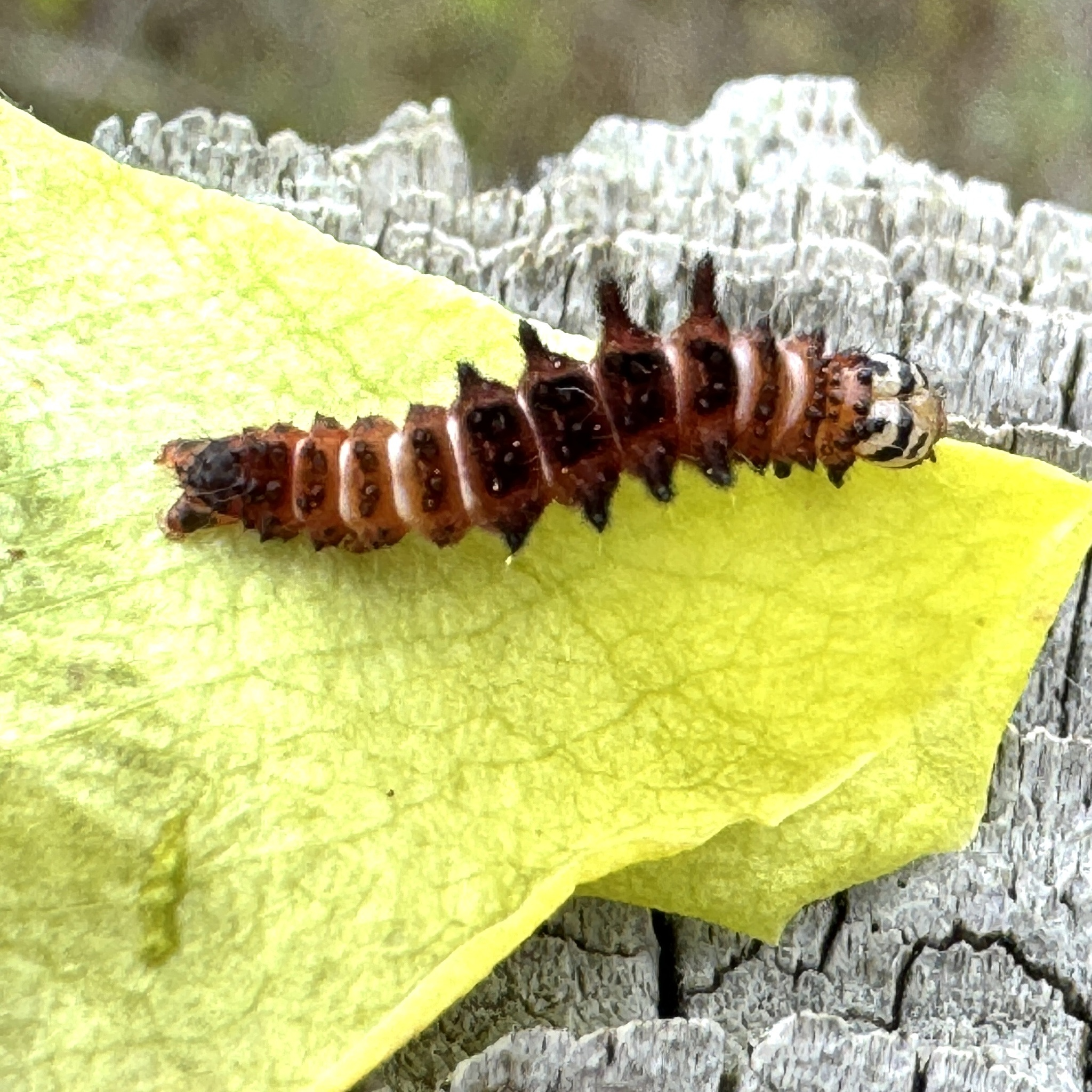
Larva

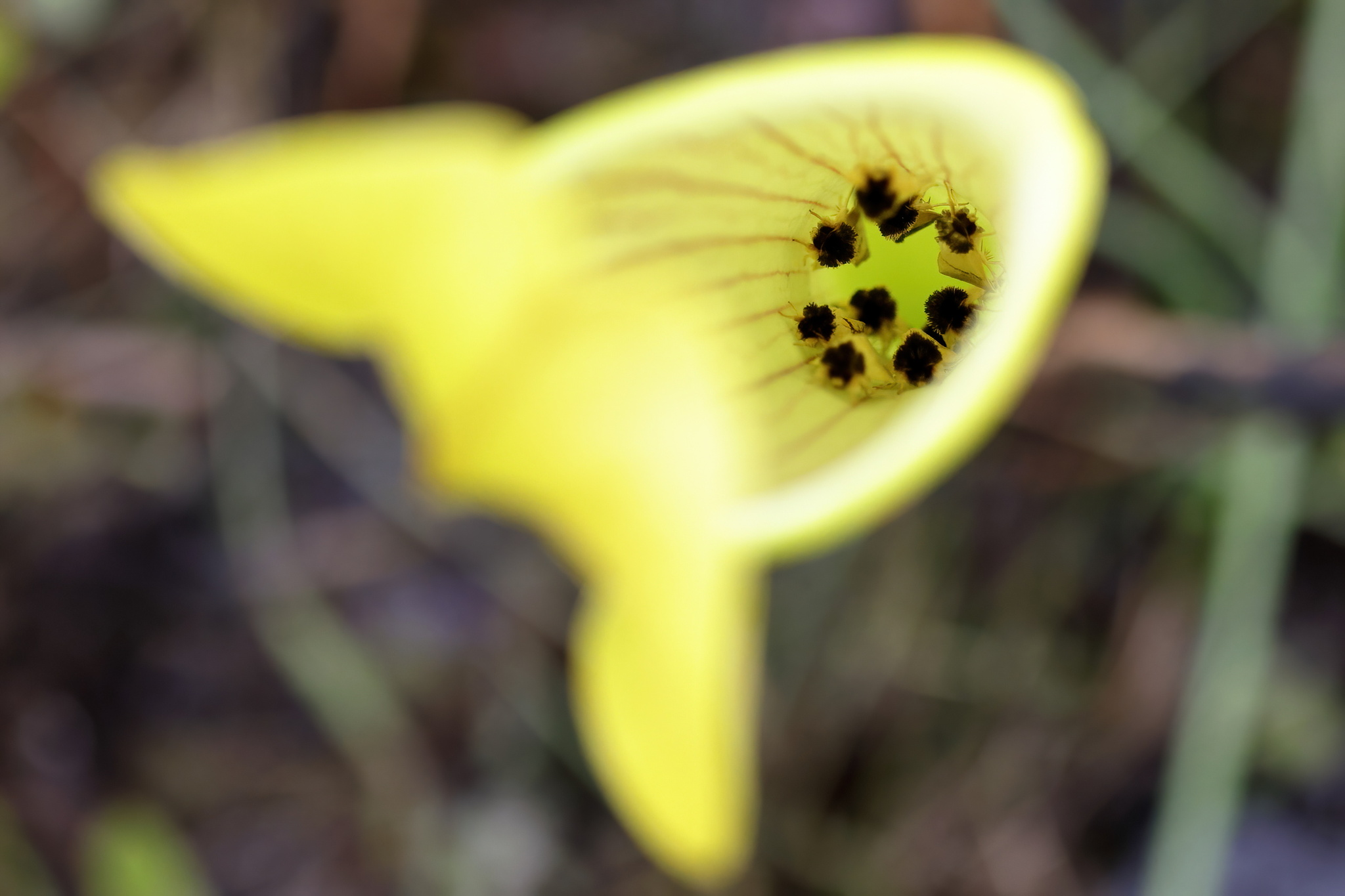
Adults inside a Sarracenia pitcher
