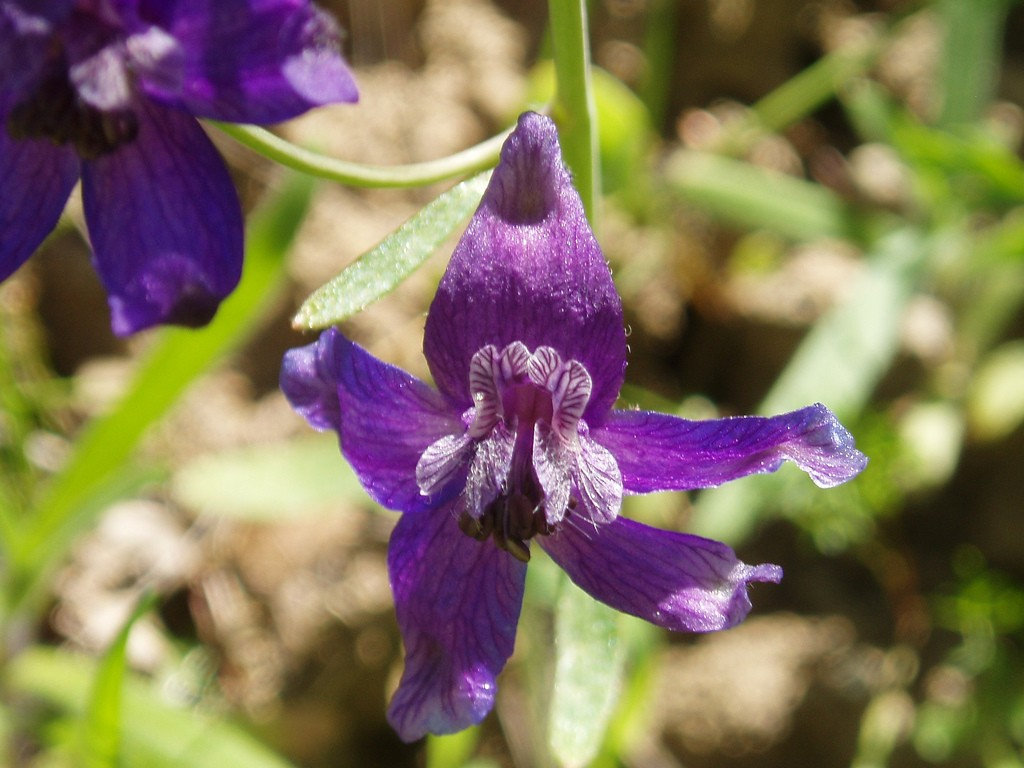

Scientific classification
- Kingdom: Plantae
- Clade: Tracheophytes
- Clade: Angiosperms
- Clade: Eudicots
- Order: Ranunculales
- Family: Ranunculaceae
- Genus: Delphinium
- Species: D. variegatum

Binomial name
- Delphinium variegatum Torr. & Gray

= Delphinium variegatum =

Species of plant

Delphinium variegatum is a species of larkspur known by the common name royal larkspur. It is endemic to California, where it grows in mountains, valley and coast in woodlands and grasslands. On the forest floor of California oak woodlands typical plant associates are Calochortus luteus, Cynoglossum grande and Calochortus amabilis.

== Description ==
This erect wildflower may reach half a meter in maximum height. Its leaves have deep lobes which may overlap. The long petioles are hairy. The branching inflorescence holds up to 25 widely spaced flowers, which are usually bright deep blue, and occasionally lighter blue or white, depending on subspecies. The spur is between one and two centimeters long.

== Subspecies ==
There are three generally accepted subspecies.

- ssp. kinkiense
- ssp. thornei
- ssp. kinkiensis

Two of them, ssp. kinkiense and ssp. thornei, are endemic to San Clemente Island, one of the Channel Islands of California. Ssp. kinkiensis, which is sometimes called Delphinium kinkiense ssp. kinkiense, is treated as a federally listed endangered species. Although it is in fact rarer than ssp. kinkiensis, ssp. thornei does not have a federal or state listing.

Unlike the other two subspecies, ssp. kinkiensis sometimes bears white flowers. Blue-flowered individuals are difficult to differentiate from ssp. thornei.
