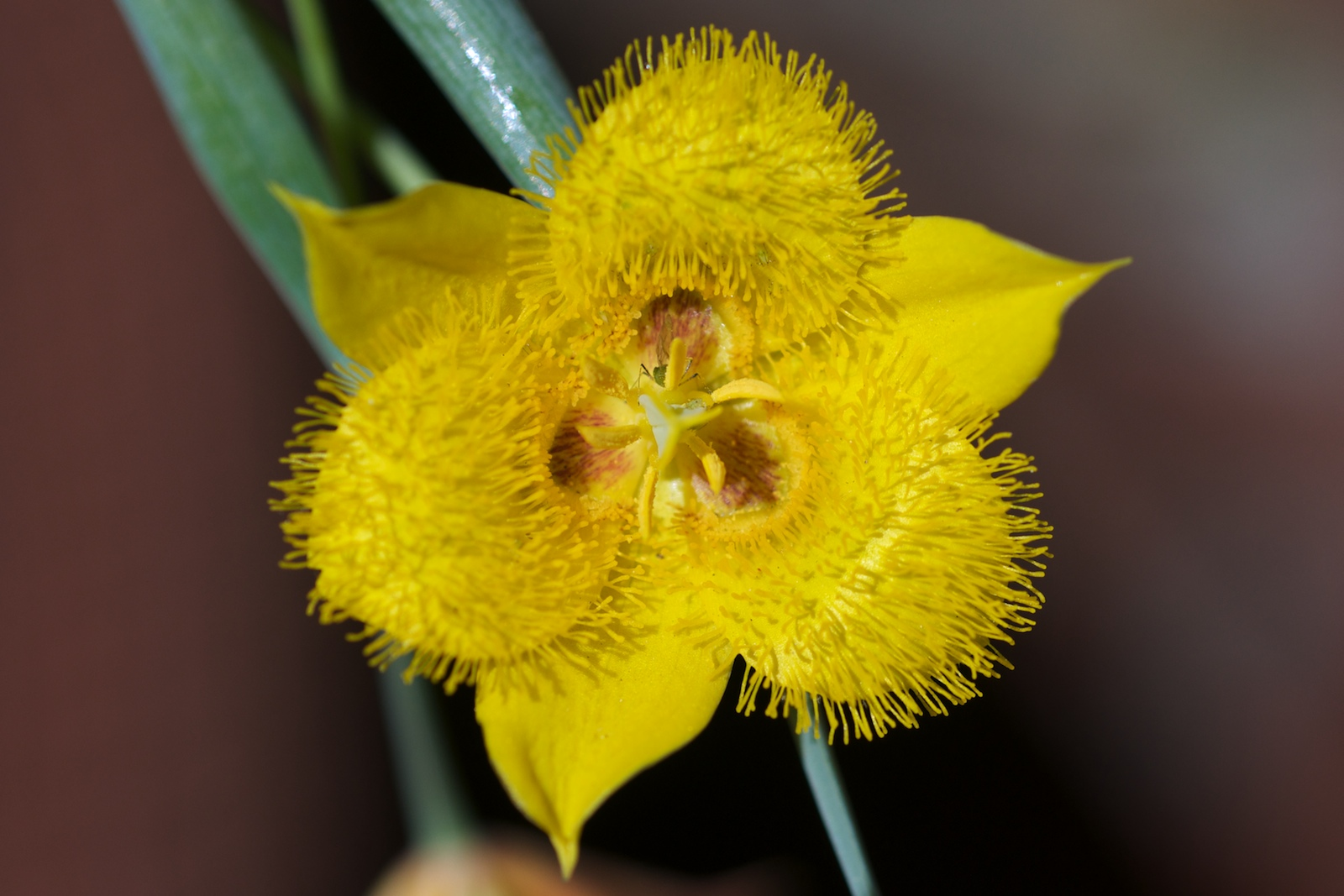

Conservation status
- Vulnerable (NatureServe)

Scientific classification
- Kingdom: Plantae
- Clade: Tracheophytes
- Clade: Angiosperms
- Clade: Monocots
- Order: Liliales
- Family: Liliaceae
- Genus: Calochortus
- Species: C. monophyllus

Binomial name
- Calochortus monophyllus (Lindl.) Lem.

Synonyms
- Synonymy: Cyclobothra monophylla Lindl.; Calochortus nitidus Torr. 1857, illegitimate homonym not Douglas 1828; Cyclobothra elegans var. lutea Benth.; Cyclobothra nitida Torr. 1857, illegitimate homonym not (Douglas) Kunth 1843; Calochortus nitidus var. cornutus Alph.Wood; Calochortus pulchellus var. parviflorus Regel; Calochortus benthamii Baker; Calochortus benthamii var. wallacei Purdy & L.H.Bailey; Calochortus maculatus Eastw.

= Calochortus monophyllus =

Species of flowering plant

Calochortus monophyllus is a North American species of flowering plants in the lily family known by the common name yellow star-tulip.

Calochortus monophyllus is endemic to California. It is found in the foothill Interior oak woodland and yellow pine forest habitats of the Sierra Nevada and southernmost Cascades in California, from Shasta County to Tulare County.

== Description ==
Calochortus monophyllus is a perennial herb producing a slender, sometimes branched stem up to about 20 centimeters tall. The basal leaf is 10 to 30 centimeters in length and does not wither at flowering. There may be smaller leaves located along the stem.

The inflorescence bears 1 to 6 erect, bell-shaped flowers. Each flower has three pointed sepals and three more rounded petals, all bright to deep yellow. The petals may have some dark reddish spotting at the bases and are coated densely with yellow hairs on the inner surfaces.

The fruit is a winged capsule one or two centimeters long.
