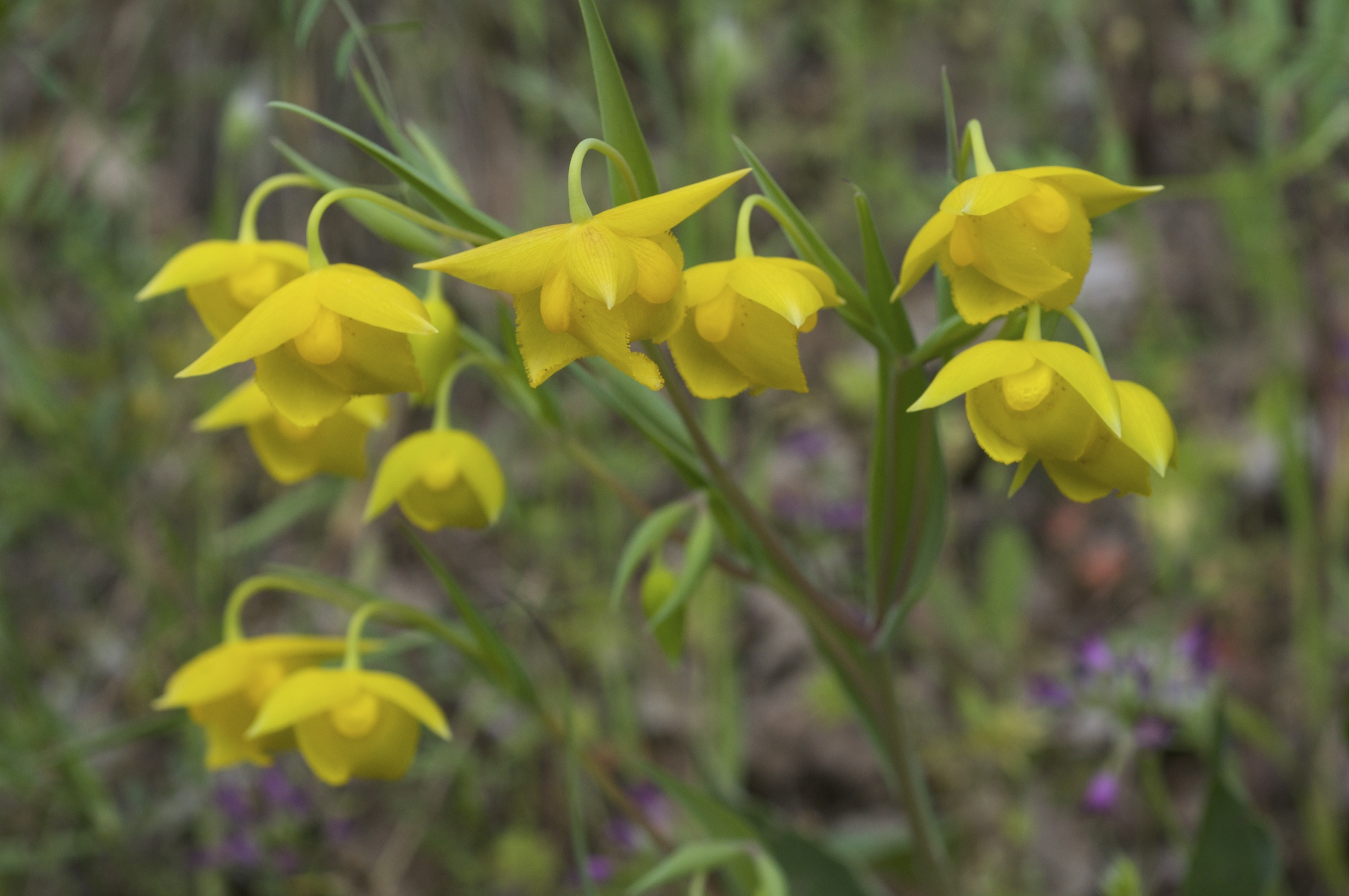

Conservation status
- Apparently Secure (NatureServe)

Scientific classification
- Kingdom: Plantae
- Clade: Tracheophytes
- Clade: Angiosperms
- Clade: Monocots
- Order: Liliales
- Family: Liliaceae
- Genus: Calochortus
- Species: C. amabilis

Binomial name
- Calochortus amabilis Purdy

= Calochortus amabilis =

Species of plant

Calochortus amabilis (syn. C. pulchellus var. amabilis) is a species of the genus Calochortus in the family Liliaceae. It is also known by the common names Diogenes' lantern, yellow globe-tulip, golden globe-tulip, yellow globe lily, golden fairy lantern, golden lily-bell, Chinese lantern, and short lily.

== Distribution and habitat ==
The plant is endemic to northern California, from the east bay (notably in Mount Diablo State Park) and north of the San Francisco Bay Area. It grows in the Northern California Coast Ranges and Klamath Mountains, from 100 metres (330 ft)–1,000 metres (3,300 ft)–1,500 metres (4,900 ft) in altitude. It is a common member of the scrub and woodland flora, found on dry slopes in California oak woodland and chaparral habitats. Soil types vary, from the nearly solid serpentine rock to yellow clay. Natural habitat is quite wet, with 75 cm or more of rain per year, followed by a dry, hot summer. Winters are cool but not frigid (USDA zones 8-9). The growing season is from midwinter to the April–May–June flowering and seed set. The plant is dormant from mid-June to November.

Common understory plant associates are Calochortus luteus, Clarkia unguiculata and Delphinium variegatum.

== Description ==
Calochortus amabilis is a bulbous perennial herb producing an upright, somewhat waxy branching stem to heights between 10 and 50 centimeters. The leaf at the base of the stem is flat, waxy, and narrow in shape, reaching up to 50 centimeters long and not withering away at flowering.

The inflorescence bears two or more heavily nodding flowers, each with spreading pointed yellow sepals and brown-speckled yellow petals. The inside of the petals is waxy and coated in small hairs. The fruit is a winged capsule up to three centimeters long containing dark brown seeds.

- Height: 10- 20- 30- 50 cm (4–20 in) high at maturity.
- Spread: 5 cm (2 in) spread.
- Stems: Stems are glaucous, stout, flexuous, and generally branching, reaching 10- 20-30-50 cm.
- Leaves: Leaves come in two types: cauline or basal (radical).
  - Basal/radical leaves: Basal leaves are shiny, lanceolate-acuminate, narrow, measure 20- 25- 50 cm in length, and are persistent through the bloom and early fruiting stage.
  - Cauline leaves: 2-4 lanceolate to linear leaves, measuring 2–20 cm in length.
- Inflorescences: Nodding, pendent flowers are borne in groups of 2-many, hanging in open branched clusters. Bracts are lanceolate, and measure 2–10 cm in length.
  - Flowers: Flowers measure about 2.5- 4 cm in length and are borne from April–June.
  - Perianth: Perianth is spheric and is either neatly closed at the tip or has petals that overlap slightly at the tip.
    - Sepals: Three conspicuous ovate to lanceolate, spreading sepals, are deeply appressed at the base to the petals. Sepals are often tinged green or red, and measure 1.5- 2 cm long. Sepals are held horizontally to slightly descending.
    - Petals: Three ovate or widely lanceolate petals with a short claw and obtuse apex are deeply to brightly yellow, sometimes tinged green with abaxial brown spots and are glabrous, except for the margins, which are densely ciliate (having a fringe of hairs), Petals are slightly longer than sepals and measure 1.6- 2 cm long.
  - Nectary: Crescent-shaped to almost rectangular, depressed, (forming a knoblike structure on the outside of each petal) with several transverse, fringed membranes with white or yellow glandular hairs measuring 1/3-2/3 of the width of the petals.
  - Stamens:
    - Filaments: 5mm in length, dilated at the base.
    - Anthers: 3-4mm in length, white to pale yellow.
- Fruit: Nodding, oblong, winged capsule, measuring 2–3 cm in length.
- Seeds: Dark brown and irregularly shaped.

== Uses ==
=== Food ===
The bulbs of Calochortus amabilis are a traditional food of the Kashaya Pomo of California, who bake or boil the bulbs, which are then eaten like baked or boiled potatoes. They are a beloved food of the Pomo, locally referred to as "bo".

=== Cultivation ===
Calochortus amabilis is cultivated as an ornamental plant by specialty native plant and bulb nurseries, for use in traditional and wildlife gardens, and natural landscaping projects.

- Hardiness: Hardy, particularly if well mulched. In cold areas, it can be grown in an alpine house or an unheated glasshouse.
- Light : Prefers sun to partial or full shade.
- Soil: Adaptable, but prefers well-drained soil. Prefers a humus-rich, water-retentive medium with up to two thirds organic matter and one third sand, gravel, or grit.
- Water: Drought tolerant to moderate. In the wild, the plant grows in areas with more than 2.5 cm of rain per week during the growing season. If grown in pots, plants should get 2.2-3.8 cm of water per week, since containers typically dry out more quickly. Complete dryness is needed for the dormant season; some growers dig the bulbs up for the summer to prevent premature autumn growth or bulb rot.
- Propagation: Sow seed as soon as ripe. Seeds require no treatment to aid germination.
- Pests and diseases: Trouble free.

In the wild, C. amabilis naturally hybridizes with Calochortus tolmiei.

== Etymology ==
Amabilis means 'pleasing', 'likeable', or 'lovely'. Calochortus is derived from Greek meaning 'beautiful grass', a reference to the characteristic grass-like foliage of the genus. The full name translates literally to 'lovable, beautiful grass'.

The common name "Diogenes' Lantern" is a reference to the Greek philosopher Diogenes, who famously carried a lantern around in broad daylight, claiming he was "looking for a man" (implying that none of the beings he saw around him qualified; sometimes quoted as "looking for an honest man").
