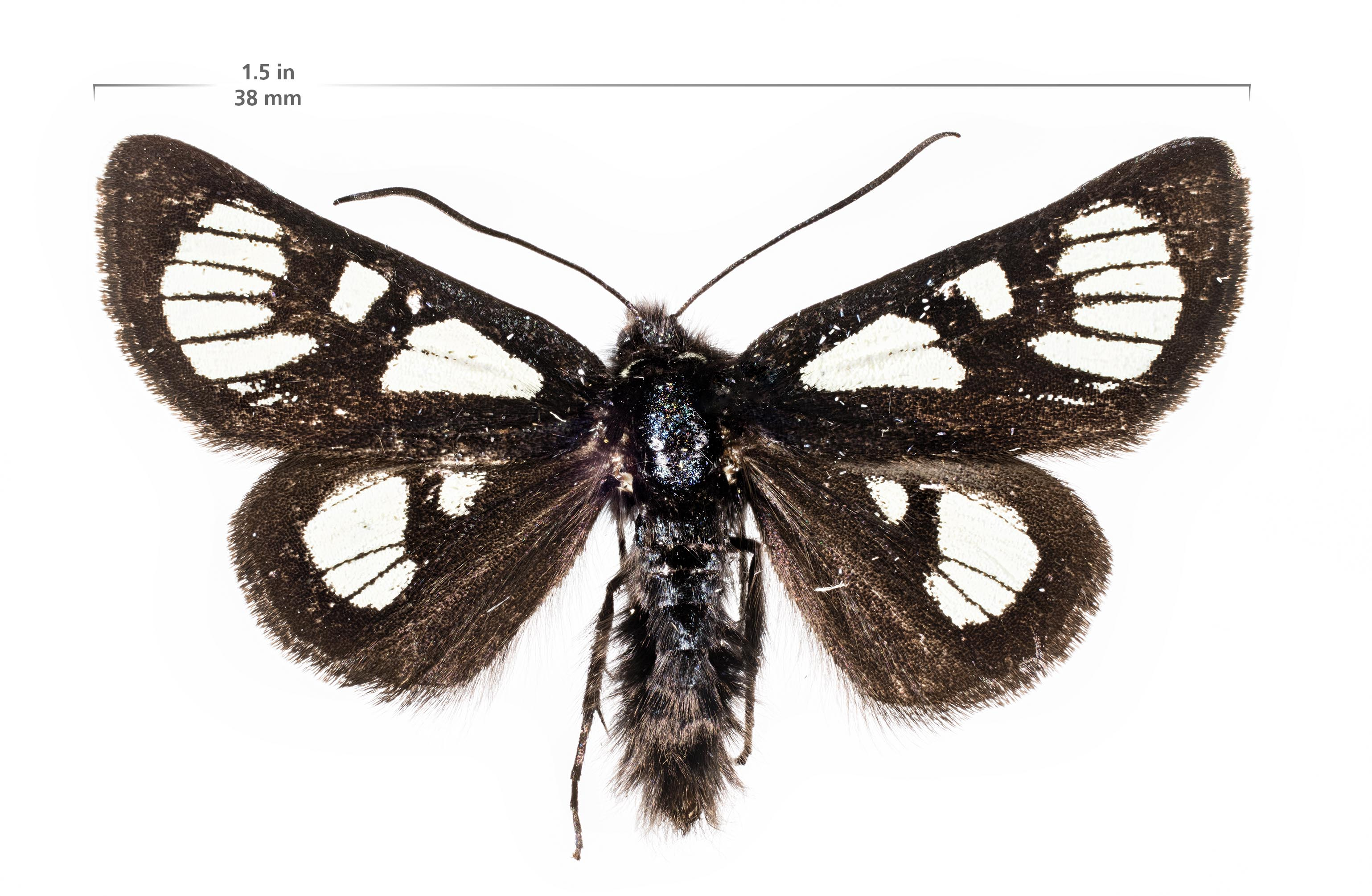

Scientific classification
- Kingdom: Animalia
- Phylum: Arthropoda
- Clade: Pancrustacea
- Class: Insecta
- Order: Lepidoptera
- Superfamily: Noctuoidea
- Family: Noctuidae
- Genus: Alypia
- Species: A. ridingsii

Binomial name
- Alypia ridingsii Grote, 1864

= Alypia ridingsii =

Species of moth

Alypia ridingsii, the mountain forester or Ridings' forester, is a moth of the family Noctuidae. The species was first described by Augustus Radcliffe Grote in 1864. It is found in North America as far east as the eastern edge of the Rocky Mountains in Colorado. It is also found in Arizona, Utah, all of California and northward into Oregon, Idaho, Washington, British Columbia and Alaska. The species is named after James Ridings.

The wingspan is about 30 mm. Adults are on wing from March to May in California and as late as June in the more northern and eastern parts of its range.

The larvae feed on Camissonia bistorta, Camissonia californica, Camissonia dentata and Clarkia rhomboidea.
