= List of plants of the Sierra Nevada (U.S.) =

The Sierra Nevada is a mountain range running 400 miles (640 km) north-to-south along eastern California, and occasionally into western Nevada. This list of native plants is organized by elevational distribution ranges and their plant communities. Some plants with a broader altitudinal range are found listed in their predominant habitat elevation. All the plant species listed are native to the Sierra's foothills, valleys, and mountains. In addition some are also endemic to here and elsewhere within California, labeled (ca-endemic). Some are further endemic to and only found in the Sierra Nevada, labeled (sn-endemic).

The Sierra Nevada's length, height, geological age, and wide variety of ecosystems and habitats, make it home to one of the most diverse collections of distinct plant species in the United States.

The Sierra Nevada are primarily within the California Floristic Province, with the Rocky Mountain Floristic Province to the north, the Great Basin Floristic Province to the east, and Sonoran Floristic Province to the south.

Biogeography looks at the spatial and temporal distributions of species. A descending hierarchy is used, with a realms at the top, then biomes, followed by smaller terrestrial ecoregions. The Sierra Nevada are a small part of the North American continental Nearctic realm. The Sierra contain portions of two Nearctic biomes:

1. The lower elevation western Sierra foothills are in the Nearctic Mediterranean forests, woodlands, and shrub biome: which is represented here by the California chaparral and woodlands ecoregion's California interior chaparral and woodlands sub-ecoregion.
2. The valleys and mountains higher up are in the Nearctic temperate coniferous forests biome: which is represented the Sierra Nevada forests ecoregion.

== Foothill woodland and chaparral zone ==
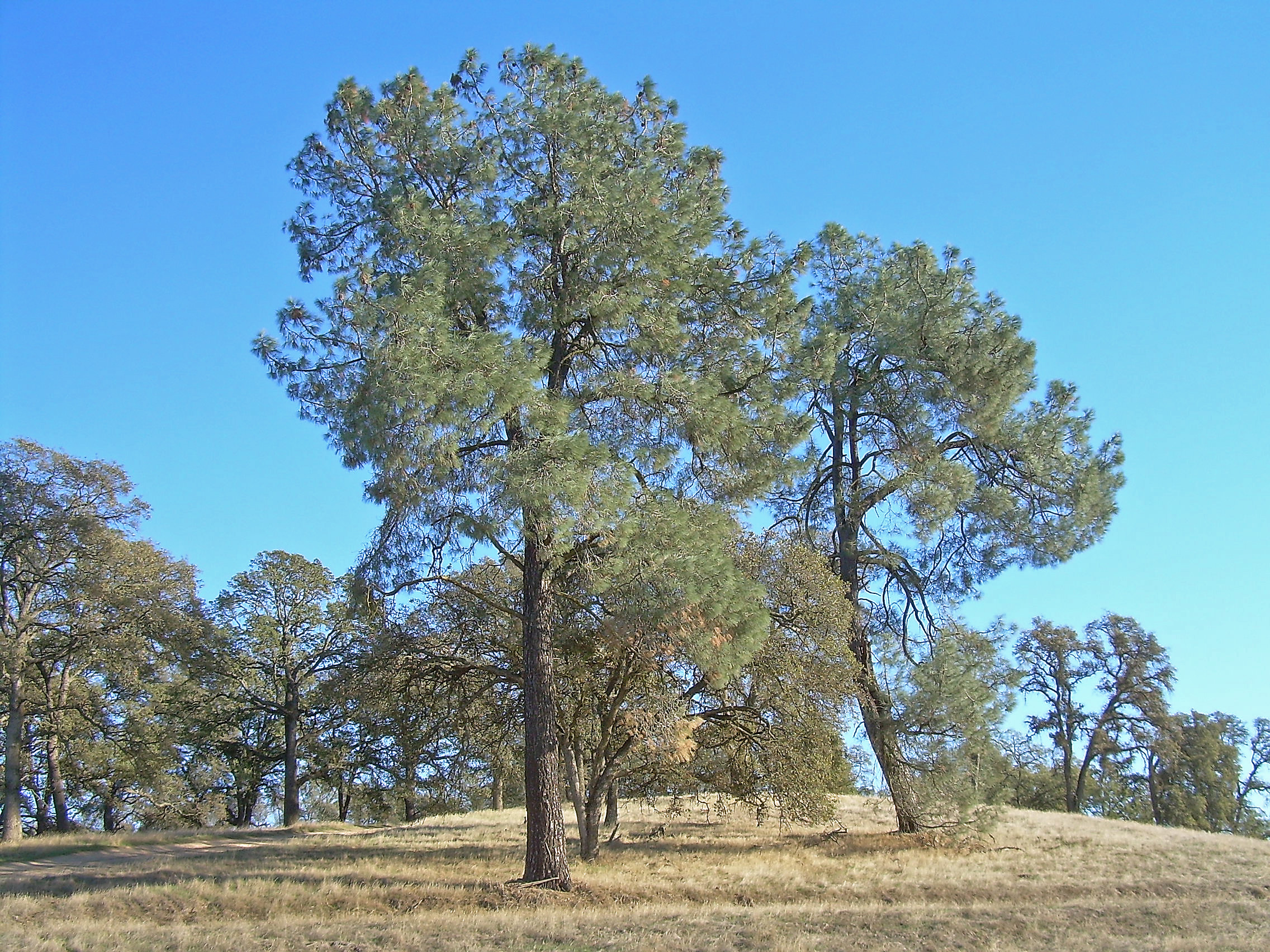
Pinus sabiniana

500 to 3,500 feet (200 to 1,100 m) (west side)

- Indicator species trees
  - Pinus sabiniana – Gray pine, California foothill pine, bull pine
  - Quercus douglasii – Blue oak
- Other trees and shrubs
  - Aesculus californica – California buckeye
  - Arbutus menziesii – Madrone
  - Carpenteria californica – Bush anemone, tree anemone (sn-endemic)
  - Cercis occidentalis – Redbud
  - Fraxinus latifolia – Oregon ash
  - Fremontodendron californicum – Fremontia, California flannelbush
  - Fremontodendron decumbens – Pine hill flannelbush (sn-endemic), endangered species
  - Quercus garryana var. semota – Garry oak
  - Quercus lobata – Valley oak
  - Quercus wislizenii – Interior live oak
  - Salix laevigata – Red willow
  - Salix lasiolepis – Arroyo willow
  - Platanus racemosa-California Sycamore
- Chaparral
  - Adenostoma fasciculatum – Chamise (dominant species)
  - Arctostaphylos spp. – Manzanita
    - Arctostaphylos mewukka – Indian manzanita (sn-endemic)
    - Arctostaphylos myrtifolia – Ione manzanita (sn-endemic)
    - Arctostaphylos nissenana – Nissenan manzanita (sn-endemic)
  - Ceanothus spp. – California lilac
    - Ceanothus roderickii – Pine hill ceanothus (sn-endemic)
    - Ceanothus tomentosus – Woollyleaf ceanothus
  - Heteromeles arbutifolia – Toyon
  - Quercus berberidifolia – California scrub oak
  - Quercus wislizenii – Interior live oak (scrub form)
  - Rhamnus alnifolia – Alderleaf buckthorn
  - Rhamnus californica (Frangula californica) – Coffeeberry
  - Rhamnus crocea – Redberry buckthorn
  - Ribes amarum – Bitter gooseberry (ca-endemic)
  - Ribes aureum – Golden currant
  - Ribes malvaceum – Chaparral currant
  - Ribes nevadense – Sierra currant, mountain pink currant
  - Ribes roezlii – Sierra gooseberry
  - Rosa californica – California wild rose
  - Salvia sonomensis – Sonoma creeping sage
- Wildflowers, herbaceous perennials, and others
  - Allium obtusum – Red Sierra onion, subalpine onion
  - Allium yosemitense – Yosemite onion (sn-endemic)
  - Calochortus amoenus – Purple fairy-lantern (sn-endemic)
  - Calochortus luteus – Yellow mariposa lily (ca-endemic)
  - Calochortus plummerae – Plummer's mariposa lily (ca-endemic)
  - Calochortus venustus – Butterfly mariposa lily (ca-endemic)
  - Carex tumulicola – Foothill sedge
  - Daucus pusillus – American wild carrot
  - Eragrostis hypnoides – Teal lovegrass
  - Lomatium californicum – California rock parsnip
  - Lomatium congdonii – Mariposa desertparsley (sn-endemic)
  - Lomatium stebbinsii – Stebbins' desertparsley (sn-endemic)
  - Lupinus stiversii – Harlequin lupine (ca-endemic)
  - Monardella candicans – Sierra monardella (sn-endemic)
  - Melica aristata – Bearded melicgrass
  - Melica californica – California melic (bunchgrass)
  - Melica harfordii – Harford's oniongrass (bunchgrass)
  - Melica imperfecta – Little California melic (bunchgrass)
  - Mimulus bolanderi – Bolander's monkeyflower (ca-endemic)
  - Mimulus congdonii – 'Congdon's monkeyflower (ca-endemic)
  - Mimulus douglasii – Purple mouse ears
  - Mimulus glaucescens – Shieldbract monkeyflower (ca-endemic)
  - Mimulus gracilipes – Slenderstalk monkeyflower (sn-endemic)
  - Mimulus inconspicuus – Smallflower monkeyflower (sn-endemic)
  - Mimulus pulchellus – Yellowlip Pansy monkeyflower (sn-endemic)
  - Mimulus shevockii – Kelso Creek monkeyflower (sn-endemic)
  - Mimulus viscidus – Sticky monkeyflower (sn-endemic)
  - Orthocarpus purpurascens – Owl clover
  - Packera layneae – Laynes butterweed, Layne's ragwort (sn-endemic)
  - Wyethia helenioides – Gray mule's ears

== Eastern slopes Great Basin xeric zone ==
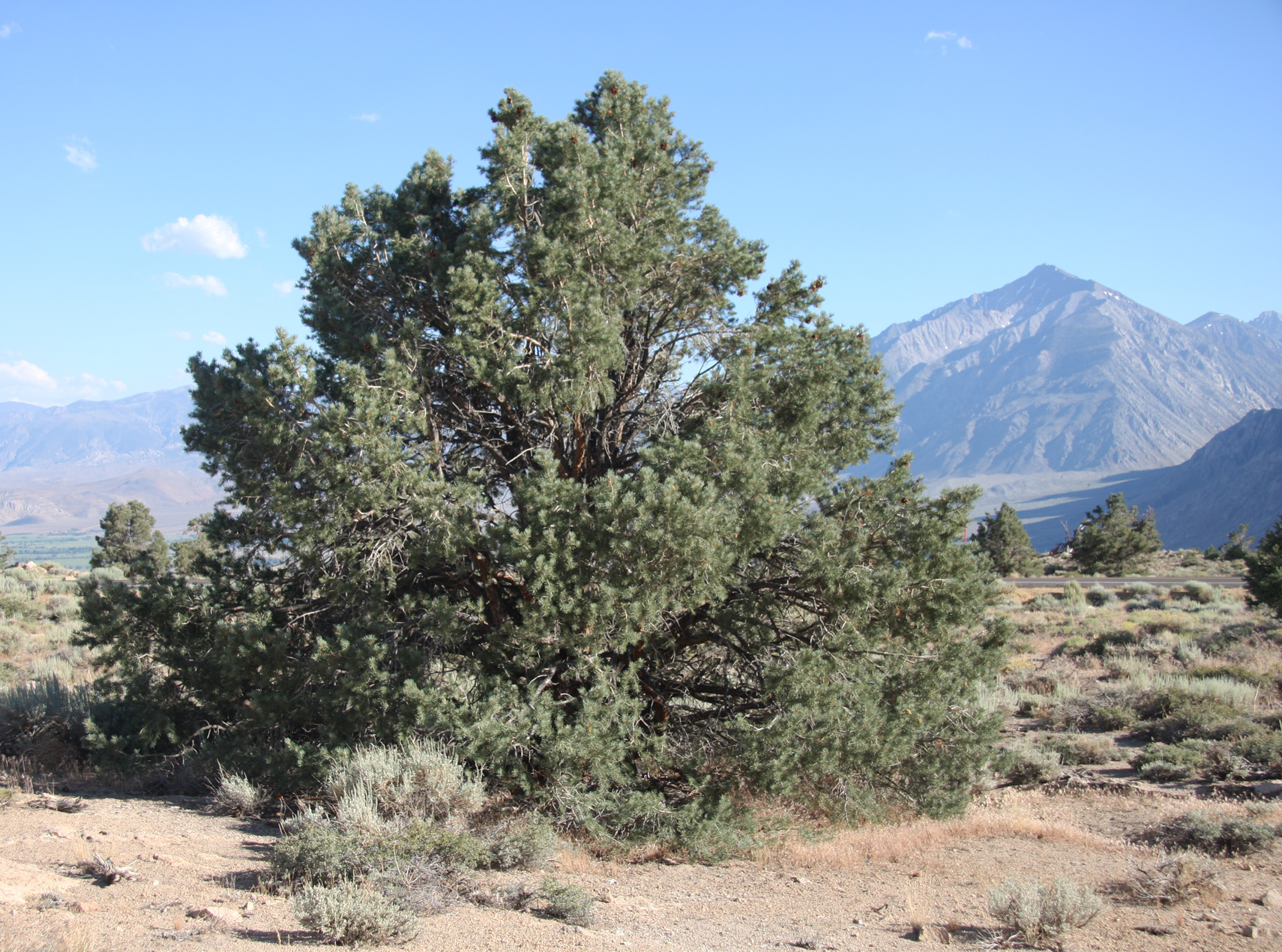
Pinus monophylla

5,000 to 7,000 feet (1,500 to 2,100 m)

- Trees and shrubs
  - Artemisia tridentata – Sagebrush, common sagebrush
  - Cercocarpus ledifolius – Curl-leaf mountain mahogany
  - Juniperus osteosperma – Utah juniper
  - Pinus attenuata – Knobcone pine
  - Pinus monophylla – Single-leaf pinyon
  - Yucca brevifolia – Joshua tree
- Perennials, subshrubs, and grasses
  - Agropyron desertorum – Desert crested wheatgrass (bunchgrass)
  - Calochortus bruneaunis – Bruneau mariposa lily
  - Dodecatheon redolens – Scented shooting star
  - Eriogonum latens – Inyo buckwheat
  - Grayia spinosa – Spiny hopsage
  - Linanthus inyoensis – Inyo gilia
  - Mimulus bigelovii – Bigelow's monkeyflower
  - Mimulus whitneyi – Harlequin monkeyflower (sn-endemic)
  - Muhlenbergia porteri – Bush muhly
  - Salvia dorrii – Purple sage
  - Sisyrinchium halophilum – Nevada blue-eyed grass
  - Sporobolus airoides – Alkali sacaton (bunchgrass)
  - Sporobolus contractus – Spike dropseed (bunchgrass)

== Lower montane forest ==
General Sherman Tree (Sequoiadendron giganteum)

3,000 to 7,000 feet (900 to 2,100 m) (west side); 7,000 to 9,000 feet (2,100 to 2,700 m) (east side)

- Dry east-side forests
  - Indicator species trees
    - Pinus ponderosa – Ponderosa pine, yellow pine – Yellow pine forest
    - Pinus jeffreyi – Jeffrey pine, yellow pine
  - Other trees
    - Calocedrus decurrens – Incense cedar
    - Fraxinus velutina – Modesto ash (very localized in the southern Sierras)
    - Pinus lambertiana – Sugar pine
    - Pseudotsuga menziesii – Douglas-fir
    - Quercus kelloggii – California black oak
    - Canyon live oak
    - Arbutus menziesii – Pacific madrone (localized in the central Sierras)
- Moist wet-side forests
  - Indicator species trees
    - Sequoiadendron giganteum – Giant sequoia (sn-endemic)
    - Pinus ponderosa – Ponderosa pine
  - Other trees
    - Abies concolor – White fir
    - Acer macrophyllum – Bigleaf maple
    - Acer negundo var. californicum – Box elder
    - Alnus incana subsp. tenuifolia – Grey alder
    - Alnus rhombifolia – White alder
    - Betula occidentalis – Water birch
    - Pinus lambertiana – Sugar pine
    - Populus trichocarpa – California poplar

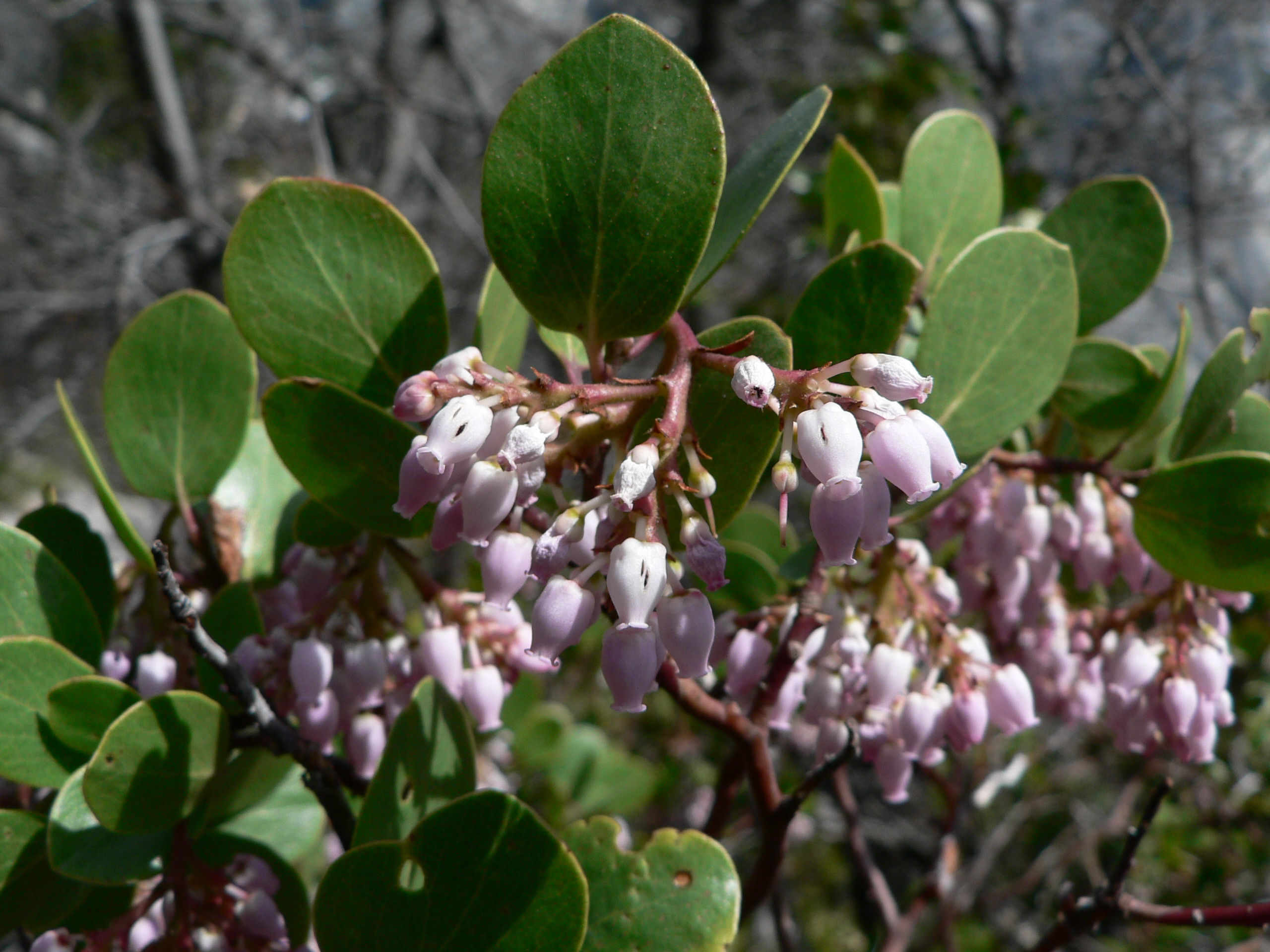
Arctostaphylos patula

- Shrubs
  - Amelanchier alnifolia var. pumila – Serviceberry
  - Amelanchier utahensis – Utah serviceberry
  - Arctostaphylos manzanita – Whiteleaf manzanita (ca-endemic)
  - Arctostaphylos nevadensis – Pinemat manzanita
  - Arctostaphylos patula – Greenleaf manzanita
  - Arctostaphylos viscida subsp. mariposa & subsp. viscida – Sticky manzanita
  - Berberis aquifolium – Oregon-grape
  - Berberis nervosa – Dwarf Oregon-grape
  - Ceanothus fresnensis – Fresno mat (sn-endemic)
  - Ceanothus parvifolius – Littleleaf ceanothus (sn-endemic)
  - Ceanothus pinetorum – Kern ceanothus (sn-endemic)
  - Chamaebatia foliolosa – Kit-kit-dizze, bear clover, mountain misery
  - Cornus nuttallii – California dogwood
  - Prunus emarginata – Oregon cherry
  - Rhamnus crocea subsp. ilicifolia (syn. Rhamnus ilicifolia) – Hollyleaf redberry
  - Rhamnus rubra – Sierra coffeeberry
  - Ribes nevadense – Sierra currant, mountain pink currant
  - Ribes roezlii – Sierra gooseberry
  - Ribes tularense – Sequoia gooseberry, Tulare gooseberry (sn-endemic)
  - Rhododendron occidentale – Western azalea
  - Rosa bridgesii – Pygmy rose
  - Rosa woodsii – Woods' rose
  - Salix spp. – Willows
    - Salix drummondiana – Drummond's willow
    - Salix exigua – Sandbar willow
    - Salix lemmonii – Lemmon's willow
    - Salix ligulifolia – Strapleaf willow
    - Salix lucida subsp. caudata, subsp. lasiandra – Shining willow, Pacific willow, or whiplash willow
    - Salix scouleriana – Scouler's willow
  - Umbellularia californica – California bay

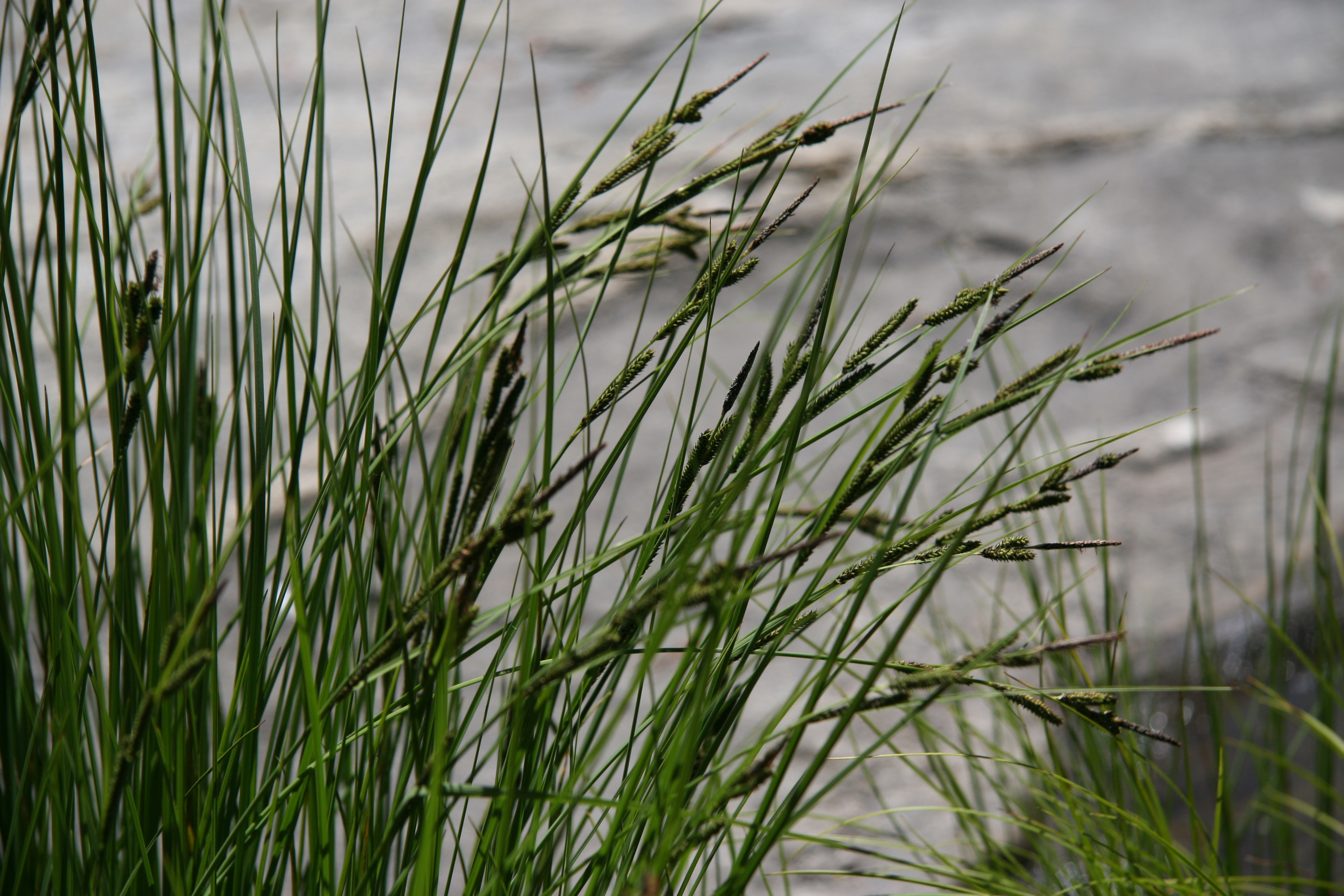
Carex utriculata, Hamilton Lake, Sequoia National Park

- Herbaceous perennials and others
  - Allium obtusum – Red Sierra onion
  - Andropogon glomeratus var. scabriglumis – Bushy bluestem bunchgrass
  - Aquilegia formosa – Western columbine
  - Blechnum spicant – Deer fern
  - Calochortus leichtlinii – Leichtlin's mariposa lily, smokey mariposa lily
  - Calochortus westonii – Shirley meadow star-tulip (sn-endemic)
  - Camissonia sierrae ssp. alticola – Mono Hot Springs evening-primrose (sn-endemic)
  - Carex spp. – Sedges
    - Carex abrupta – Abrupt-beaked sedge
    - Carex amplifolia – Bigleaf sedge
    - Carex angustata – Widefruit sedge
    - Carex athrostachya – Slenderbeak sedge
    - Carex aurea – Golden sedge
    - Carex canescens
    - Carex cusickii – Cusick's sedge
    - Carex diandra – Lesser panicled sedge
    - Carex disperma – Softleaf sedge
    - Carex douglasii – Douglas's sedge
    - Carex echinata subsp. echinata – Star sedge
    - Carex filifolia var. erostrata – Threadleaf sedge
    - Carex hassei – Salt sedge
    - Carex helleri' – Heller's sedge
    - Carex heteroneura – var. epapillosa & heteroneura – Different-nerve sedge
    - Carex hoodii – Hood's sedge
    - Carex illota – Sheep sedge
    - Carex jonesii – Jones's sedge
    - Carex lasiocarpa – Slender sedge
    - Carex lenticularis var. impressa & lipocarpa – Lakeshore sedge
    - Carex leporinella – Sierra Hare sedge
    - Carex limosa – Shore sedge
    - Carex luzulina var. ablata, var. luzulina – Woodrush sedge
    - Carex mariposana – Mariposa sedge
    - Carex multicaulis – Manystem sedge
    - Carex multicostata – Manyrib sedge
    - Carex nebrascensis – Nebraska sedge
    - Carex nervina – Sierra sedge
    - Carex nudata – California black-flowering sedge
    - Carex pellita – Woolly sedge
    - Carex petasata – Liddon sedge
    - Carex praegracilis – Field sedge
    - Carex rossii – Ross's sedge
    - Carex scoparia – Pointed broom sedge
    - Carex sheldonii – Sheldon's sedge
    - Carex simulata – Analogue sedge
    - Carex straminiformis – Shasta sedge
    - Carex utriculata – Northwest Territory sedge
    - Carex vesicaria var. major & vesicaria – Blister sedge
  - Epipactis gigantea – Stream orchid
  - Eragrostis pectinacea – Tufted lovegrass (bunchgrass)
  - Hesperostipa comata – Needle-and-thread grass (bunchgrass)
  - Iris hartwegii – Sierra iris (ca-endemic)
  - Iris missouriensis – Western blue flag iris
  - Iris tenuissima – (ca-endemic)
  - Koeleria macrantha – Prairie junegrass (bunchgrass)
  - Lilium humboldtii subsp. humboldtii – Humboldt's lily (ca-endemic)
  - Lilium pardalinum subsp. pardalinum & shastense – Leopard lily
  - Lilium washingtonianum subsp. washingtonianum – Shasta lily
  - Luzula comosa – Pacific woodrush
  - Melica fugax – Little oniongrass
  - Melica geyeri – Geyer's oniongrass
  - Melica subulata – Alaska oniongras
  - Melica torreyana – Torrey's melicgrass (bunchgrass) – (ca-endemic)
  - Mimulus aurantiacus – Sticky monkey-flower
  - Mimulus bicolor – Yellow and white monkeyflower (ca-endemic)
  - Mimulus breviflorus – Shortflower monkeyflower
  - Mimulus cardinalis – Scarlet monkeyflower
  - Mimulus guttatus – Common monkey-flower
  - Mimulus montioides – Montia-like monkeyflower (sn-endemic)
  - Monardella odoratissima – Mountain coyote mint
  - Muhlenbergia asperifolia – Scratchgrass
  - Pellaea brachyptera – Sierra cliffbrake fern
  - Pellaea breweri – Brewer's cliffbrake fern
  - Pellaea bridgesii – Bridges' cliffbrake fern
  - Pteridium aquilinum – Bracken fern
  - Sedum albomarginatum – Feather River stonecrop (sn-endemic – endangered)
  - Sisyrinchium bellum – Californian blue-eyed grass
  - Sisyrinchium elmeri – Elmer's yellow-eyed grass
  - Sisyrinchium idahoense – Idaho blue-eyed grass
  - Sporobolus vaginiflorus – Poverty dropseed (bunchgrass)
  - Streptanthus fenestratus – Tehipite Valley jewelflower (sn-endemic)
  - Xerophyllum tenax – Indian basket grass, bear grass

== Upper montane forest ==
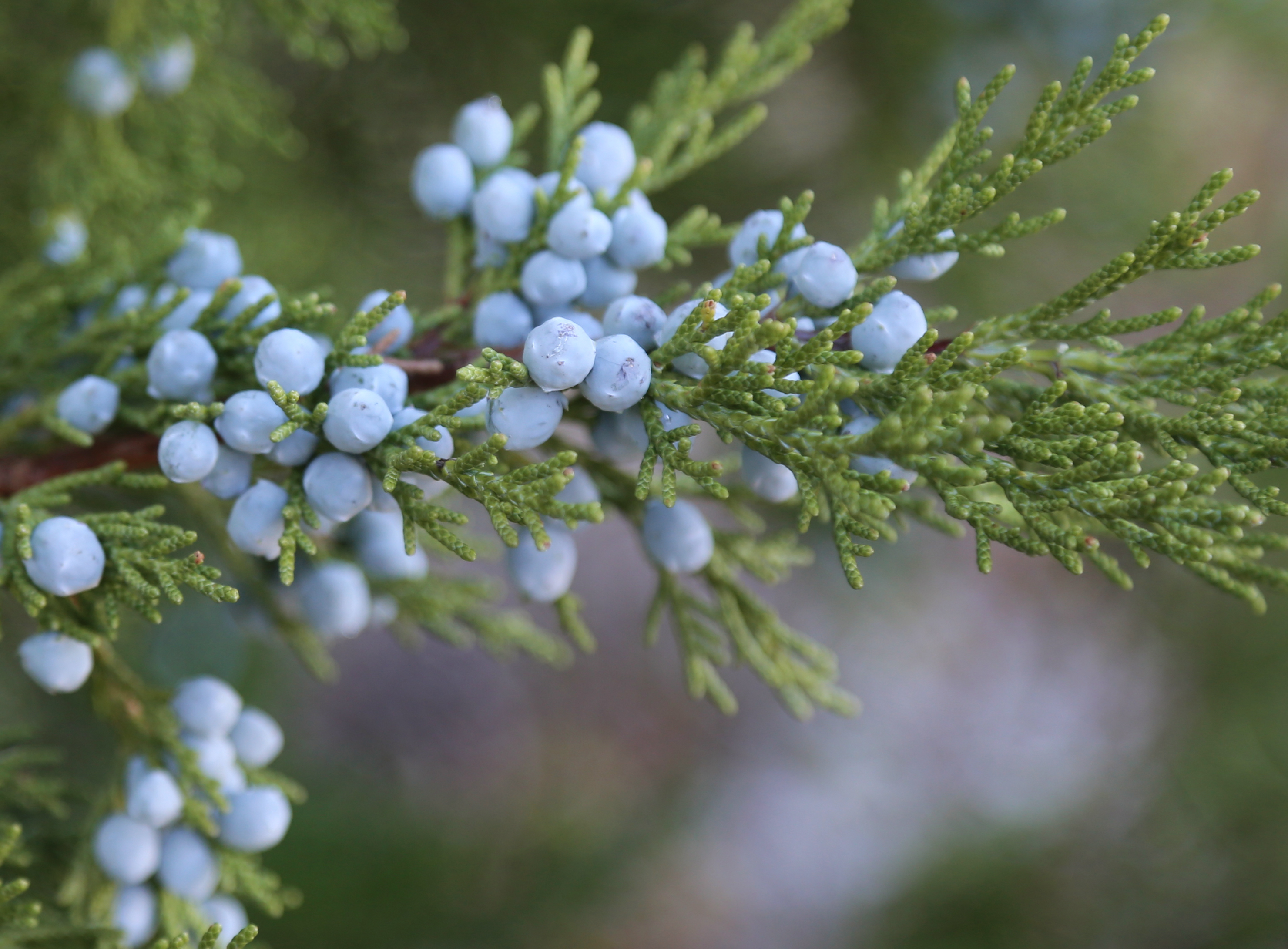
Berries of the Sierra Juniper (Juniperus occidentalis)

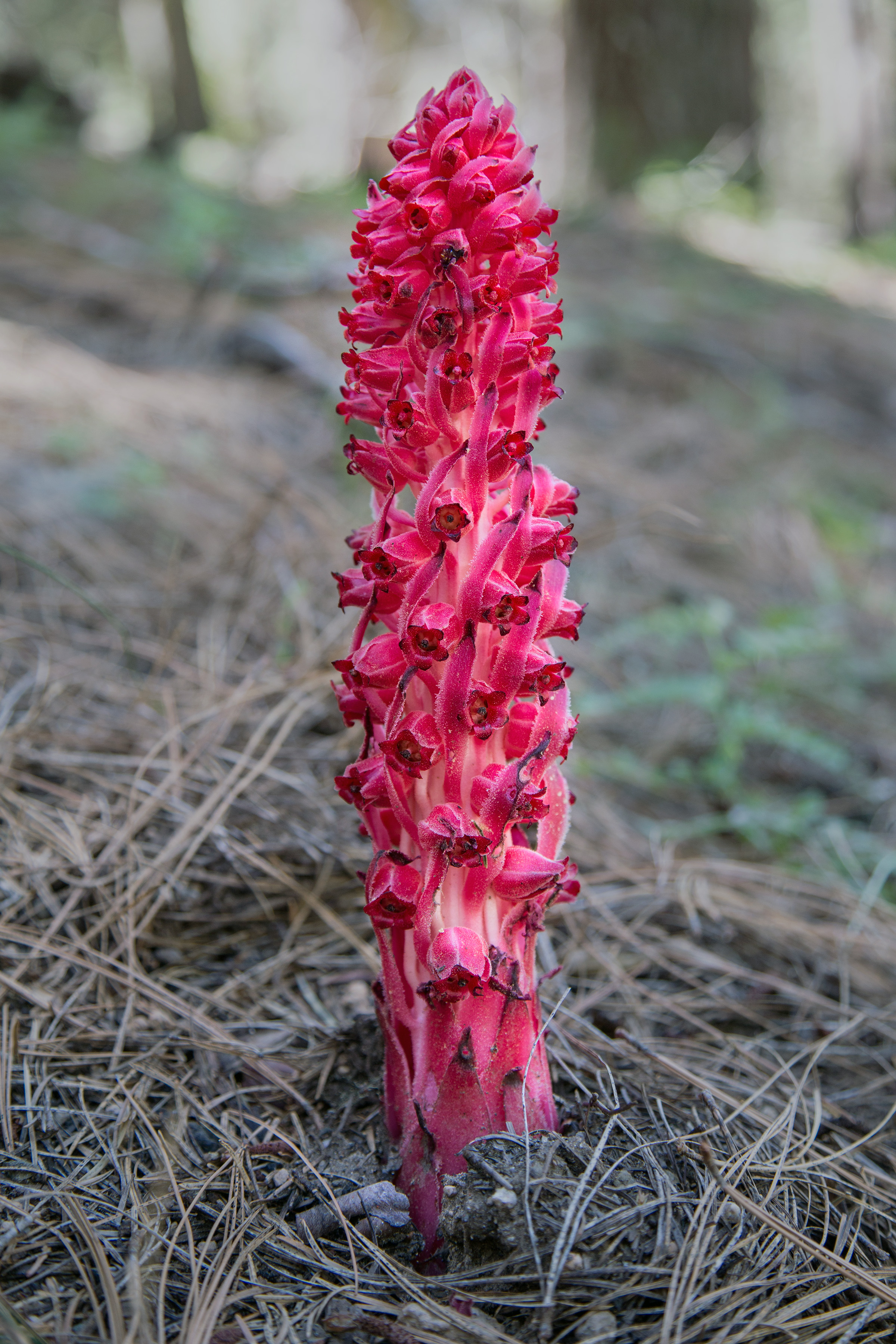
Sarcodes sanguinea

6,000 to 9,000 feet (1,800 to 2,700 m) (west side); 9,000 to 10,500 feet (2,700 to 3,200 m) (east side)

- Indicator species trees
  - Abies magnifica – Red fir
  - Pinus contorta murrayana – Lodgepole pine
- Other trees
  - Pinus monticola – Western white pine
  - Populus tremuloides – Quaking aspen
  - Juniperus occidentalis – Sierra juniper
  - Pinus jeffreyi – Jeffrey pine
  - Tsuga mertensiana – Mountain hemlock
- Shrubs
  - Chrysolepis sempervirens – Bush chinquapin
  - Arctostaphylos patula – Greenleaf manzanita
  - Arctostaphylos nevadensis – Pinemat manzanita
  - Quercus vaccinifolia – Huckleberry oak
  - Ribes nevadense – Sierra currant, mountain pink currant
  - Salix jepsonii – Jepson's willow
  - Salix arctica – Arctic willow
- Herbaceous perennials and others
  - Allium obtusum – Red Sierra onion, subalpine onion
  - Carex spp. – Sedges (see also Carex spp. "lower montane forest")
    - Carex specifica – Narrowfruit sedge
  - Elymus violaceus, syn. Elymus sierrae
  - Erigeron aequifolius – Hall's daisy (sn-endemic)
  - Lilium parvum – Sierra tiger lily (sn-endemic)
  - Lomatium torreyi – Sierra biscuitroot (sn-endemic)
  - Melica bulbosa – Oniongrass
  - Mimulus filicaulis – Slender-stemmed monkeyflower (sn-endemic)
  - Mimulus leptaleus – Slender monkeyflower (sn-endemic)
  - Mimulus torreyi – Torrey's monkeyflower (ca-endemic)
  - Phacelia inyoensis – Inyo phacelia (sn-endemic)
  - Poa cusickii – Cusick's bluegrass
  - Viola adunca – Western dog violet
  - Viola glabella – Stream violet
  - Viola macloskeyi – Western sweet-white violet
  - Woodwardia fimbriata – Giant chain fern
- Saprophytes
  - Sarcodes sanguinea – Snow plant
  - Pyrola picta – Shinleaf wintergreen
  - Pterospora andromedea – Pinedrop
  - Corallorhiza – Coral roots
  - Cephalanthera austiniae – Phantom orchid

== Subalpine zone ==
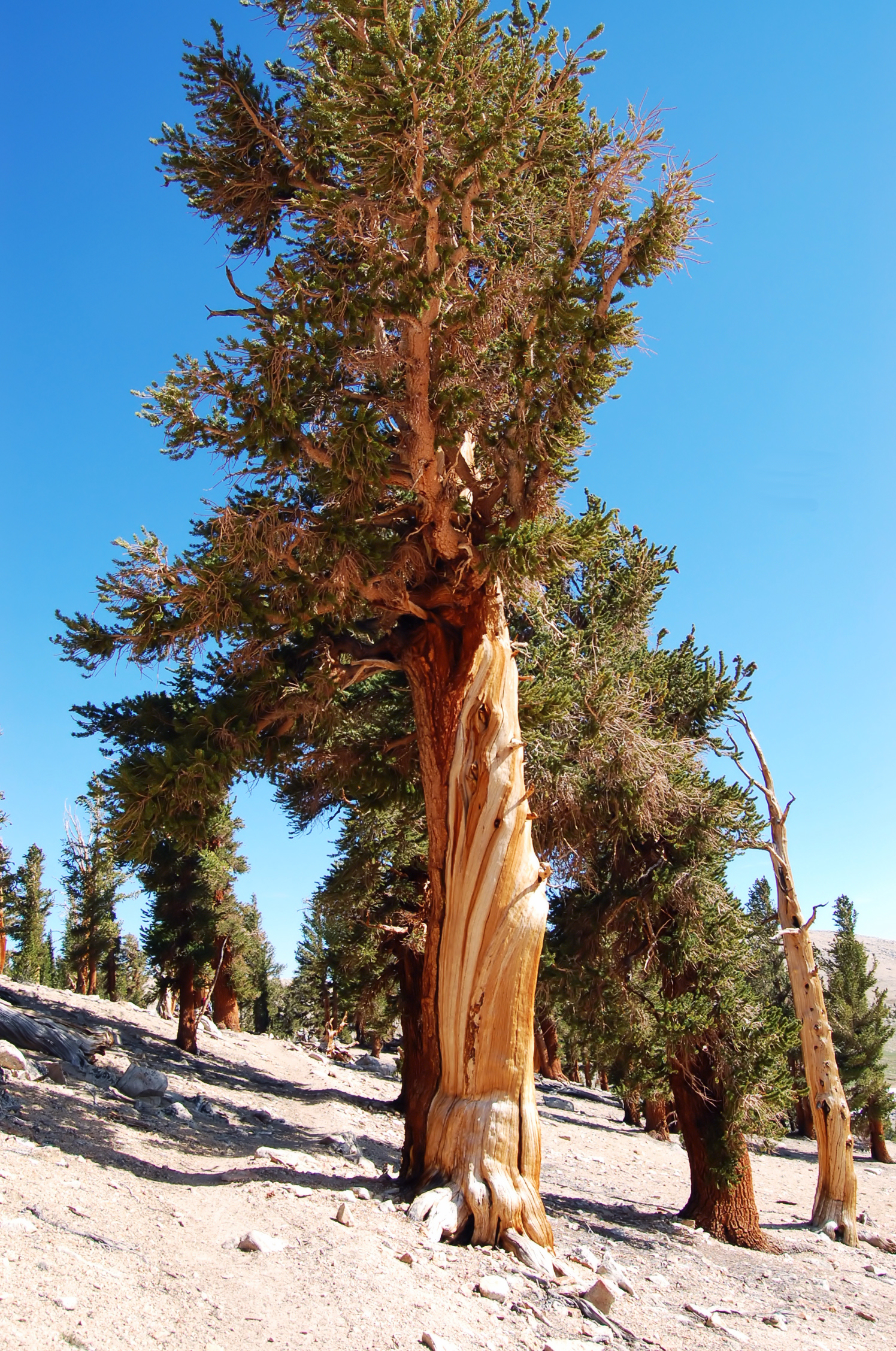
Pinus balfouriana

8,000 to 11,000 feet (2,400 to 3,400 m) (west side); 10,500 to 11,500 feet (3,200 to 3,500 m) (east side)

- Indicator species tree
  - Pinus albicaulis – Whitebark pine
- Other trees, and shrubs:
  - Pinus balfouriana subsp. austrina – Foxtail pine
  - Pinus flexilis – Limber pine (eastern slopes)
  - Pinus monticola – Western white pine
  - Juniperus occidentalis – Sierra juniper
  - Salix eastwoodiae – Mountain willow (& alpine zone)
  - Salix melanopsis – Dusky willow
- Herbaceous perennials and others:
  - Allium obtusum – Subalpine onion
  - Carex spectabilis – Showy sedge
  - Carex subnigricans – Nearlyblack sedge (& alpine zone)
  - Carex vernacula – Native sedge
  - Luzula divaricata – Forked woodrush (& alpine zone)
  - Luzula orestera – Sierra woodrush (& alpine zone)
  - Melica stricta – Rock melic (bunchgrass) – (& alpine zone)
  - Mimulus laciniatus – Cutleaf monkeyflower (sn-endemic)
  - Poa leptocoma – Western bog bluegrass (& alpine zone)

== Alpine zone ==
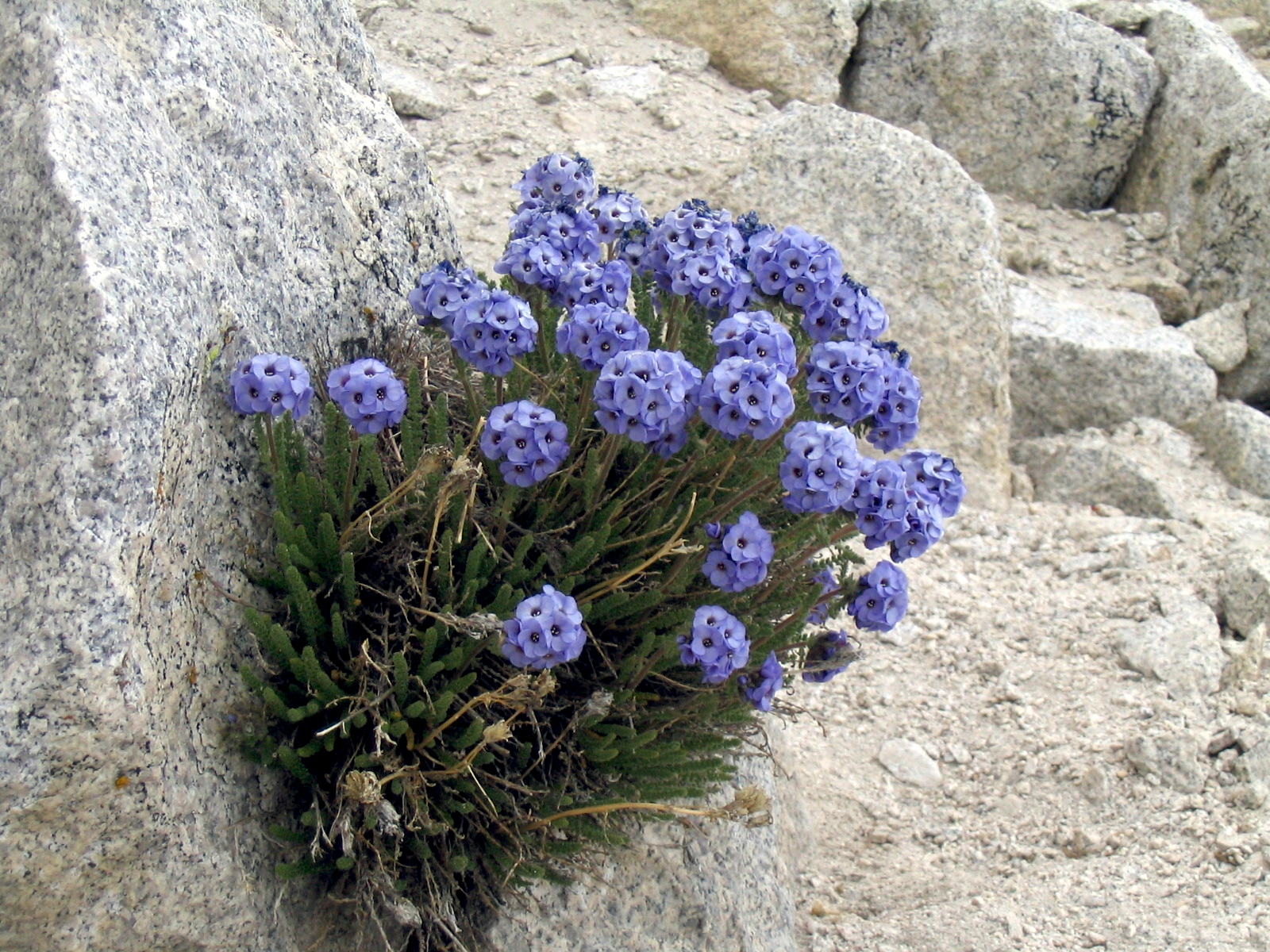
Polemonium eximium

above 9,000 feet (2,700 m) (west side); above 11,500 feet (3,500 m) (east side)

- Antennaria pulchella – Sierra pussytoes
- Aquilegia pubescens – Sierra columbine (sn-endemic) – (& sub-alpine zone)
- Carex capitata – Capitate sedge
- Carex nigricans – Black alpine sedge
- Carex phaeocephala – Dunhead sedge (& down to foothill woodlands zone)
- Carex raynoldsii – Raynolds' sedge (& sub-alpine zone)
- Lomatium shevockii – Owens Peak desert-parsley (sn-endemic)
- Muhlenbergia richardsonis – Mat muhly
- Oxyria digyna – Mountain sorrel
- Polemonium eximium – Sky pilot
- Ptilagrostis kingii – Sierra false needlegrass (sn-endemic), (& sub-alpine zone)
- Salix orestera – Gray-leafed Sierra willow (& sub-alpine zone)
- Salix planifolia subsp. planifolia- Tea-leafed willow (& sub-alpine zone)

== See also ==
- Ecology of the Sierra Nevada
- List of Giant Sequoia groves in the Sierra Nevada

== References and bibliography ==
- Note: references for each plant species are within their own articles.
- Bibliography of the Sierra Nevada (U.S.)
- "A Natural History of California," Allan A. Schoenherr, University of California Press, 1992, ISBN 0-520-06922-6.
- "A California Flora and Supplement," Phillip Munz, 1968, University of California Press, ISBN 0-520-02405-2.
- "The Jepson Manual," James C. Hickman-editor, University of California Press, 2003, ISBN 0-520-08255-9.
- "Mountain Sage: The Life of Carl Sharsmith, Yosemite Ranger and Naturalist," Elizabeth Stone O'Neill, ISBN 0-939666-47-2.
