= Pinemat manzanita =

Pinemat manzanita may refer to either of two species of the plant genus Arctostaphylos:

- Arctostaphylos uva-ursi
- Arctostaphylos nevadensis, native to western North America
