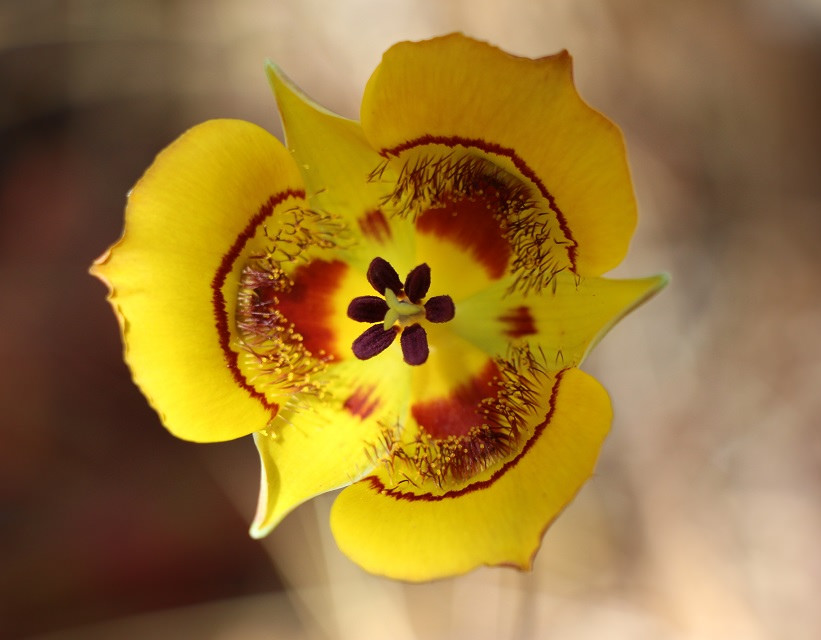

Scientific classification
- Kingdom: Plantae
- Clade: Tracheophytes
- Clade: Angiosperms
- Clade: Monocots
- Order: Liliales
- Family: Liliaceae
- Genus: Calochortus
- Species: C. clavatus

Binomial name
- Calochortus clavatus S.Wats.

= Calochortus clavatus =

Species of flowering plant

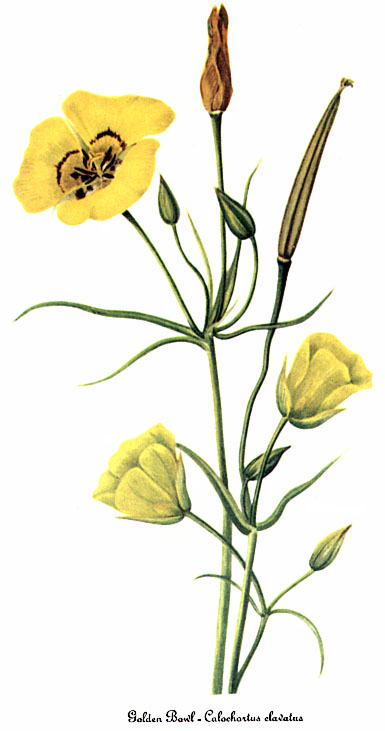
Botanical illustration.

Calochortus clavatus is a species of mariposa lily known by the common name clubhair mariposa lily. It is endemic to California where it is found in forests and on chaparral slopes.

== Description ==
The Calochortus clavatus lily produces tall stems up to 1 metre (3.3 ft) in height and only basal leaves.

Atop the stem is a lily bloom with sepals up to 4 centimeters long. The petals are up to 5 centimeters long and yellow with a darker line or series of bands near the base, which are often red. The cup of the flower is filled with hairs which have clubbed ends. The anthers are often deep purple.

The capsule fruit is up to 9 centimeters long.

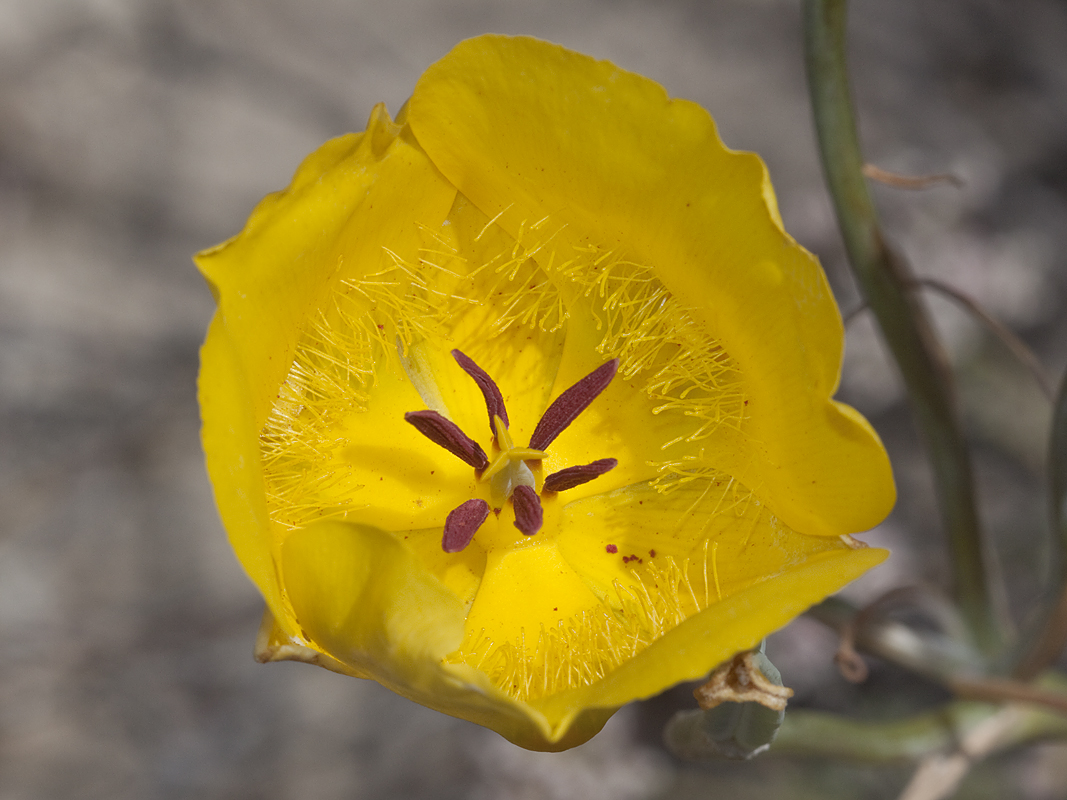
Calochortus clavatus var. pallidus, San Luis Obispo County

Varieties

Varieties of Calochortus clavatus include:

- Calochortus clavatus var. avius — northwestern Sierra Nevada foothills
- Calochortus clavatus var. clavatus —
- Calochortus clavatus var. gracilis — slender Mariposa lily; western Transverse Ranges (San Gabriels, Santa Susanas, Santa Monicas, & Simi Hills.)
- Calochortus clavatus var. pallidus
- Calochortus clavatus var. recurvifolius — Arroyo de la Cruz mariposa lily; southern outer Coast Range north of Arroyo de la Cruz— Piedras Blancos, San Luis Obispo County.

== See also ==
- California chaparral and woodlands — ecoregion.
  - California coastal sage and chaparral — subregion.
  - California montane chaparral and woodlands — subregion.
  - California interior chaparral and woodlands— subregion.
- List of California native plants
- List of plants of the Sierra Nevada (U.S.)

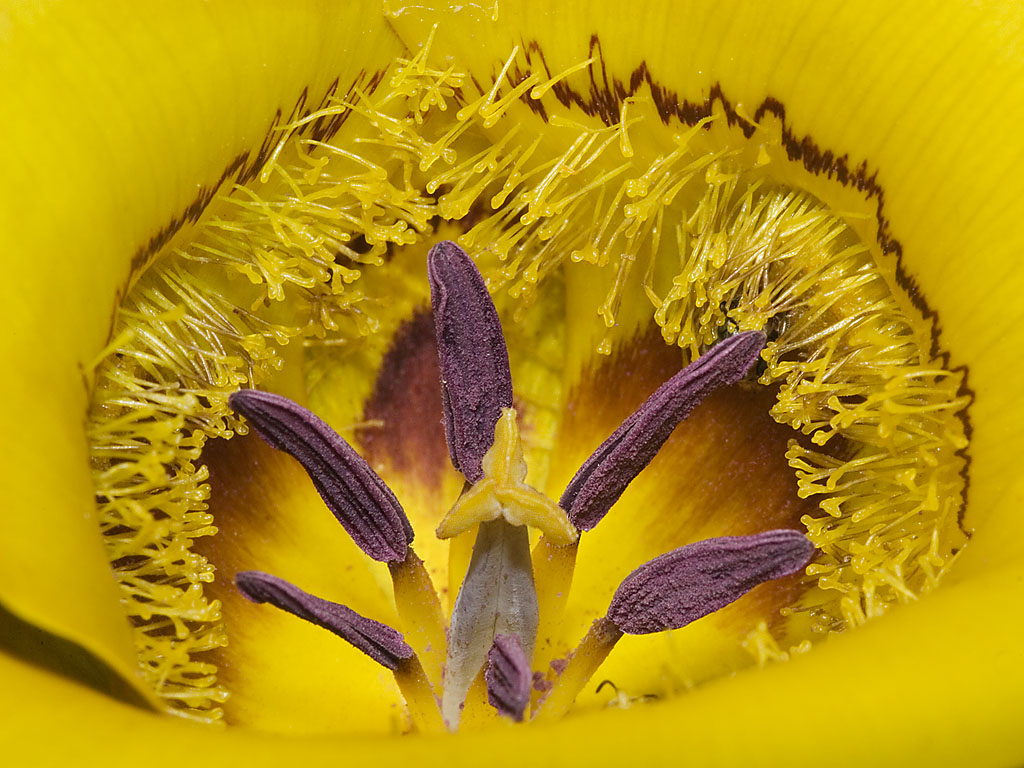
Closeup of flower.
