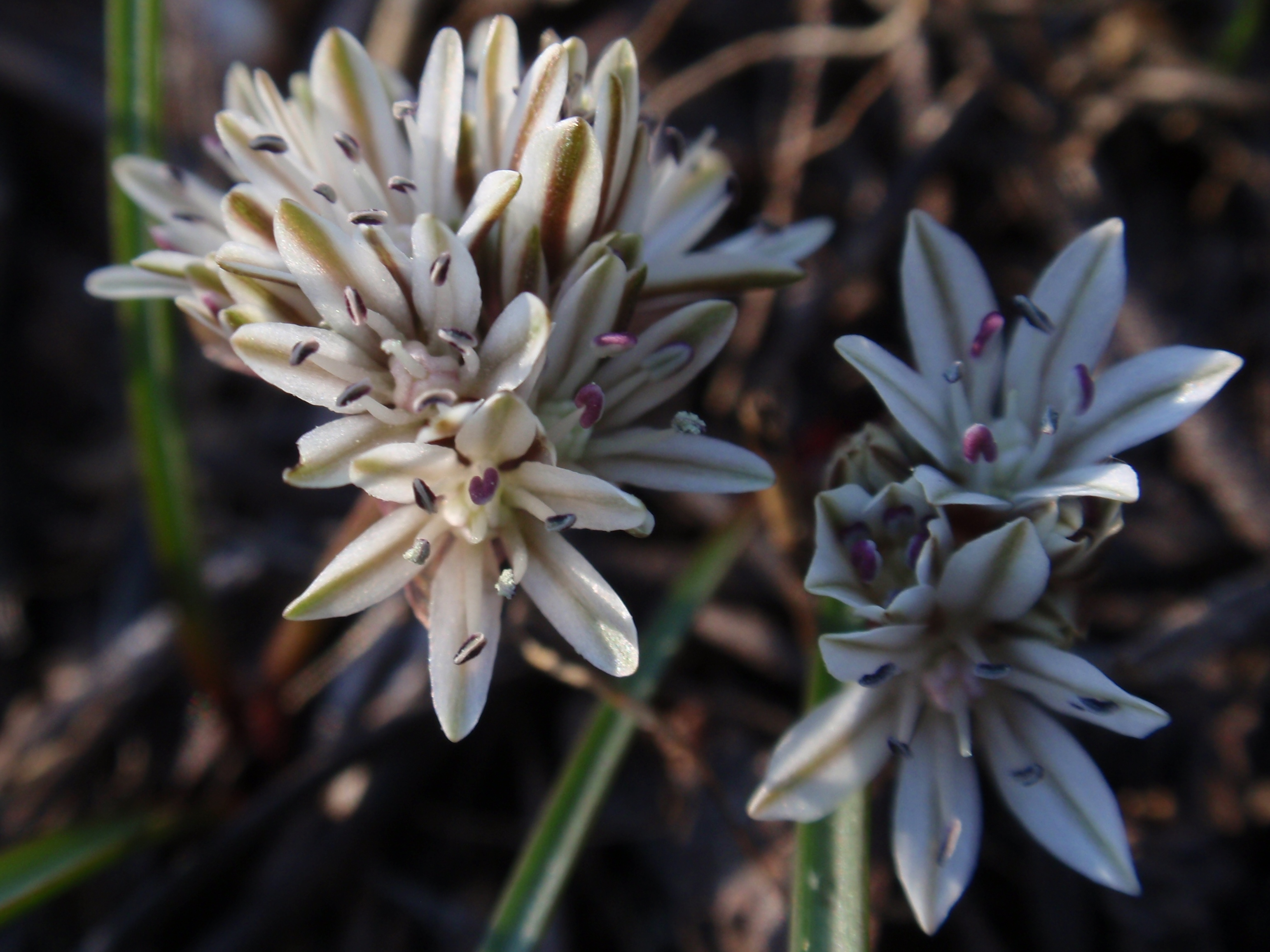

Conservation status
- Apparently Secure (NatureServe)

Scientific classification
- Kingdom: Plantae
- Clade: Tracheophytes
- Clade: Angiosperms
- Clade: Monocots
- Order: Asparagales
- Family: Amaryllidaceae
- Subfamily: Allioideae
- Genus: Allium
- Species: A. obtusum

Binomial name
- Allium obtusum J.G.Lemmon

= Allium obtusum =

Red Sierra onion

Species of flowering plant

Allium obtusum is a species of wild onion known by the common name red Sierra onion or subalpine onion. It is native to eastern California and western Nevada. It is a common plant in the granite foothills and mountains of the Sierra Nevada and southern Cascade Range, from Tulare County to Siskiyou County, from elevations of 800 to 3,500 metres (2,600 to 11,500 ft). In Nevada, it is reported only from Washoe County in the northwestern part of the state.

== Description ==
The red Sierra onion, Allium obtusum, grows from a bulb one or two centimeters wide and bears a scape which can range from 2 to 17 cm tall. Unlike Allium campanulatum, A. obtusum has leaves that do not wither before the flowers bloom. Atop the scape is an umbel of up to 60 flowers, each of which may be 4 to 12 millimeters wide. The tepals are white, purple, or pink with dark purple midveins. Anthers are yellow or purple; pollen purple.

== Varieties ==
Two varieties are recognized:

- Allium obtusum var. obtusum—Leaves 0.5-4.0 mm wide; tepals white with dark midveins—most of the range of the species
- Allium obtusum var. conspicuum Mortola & McNeal—Leaves 2–14 mm wide; tepals pink with darker midvein—from about Lake Tahoe area to Mt Lassen area

== See also ==
- List of plants of the Sierra Nevada (U.S.)
- California interior chaparral and woodlands
- Sierra Nevada subalpine zone
