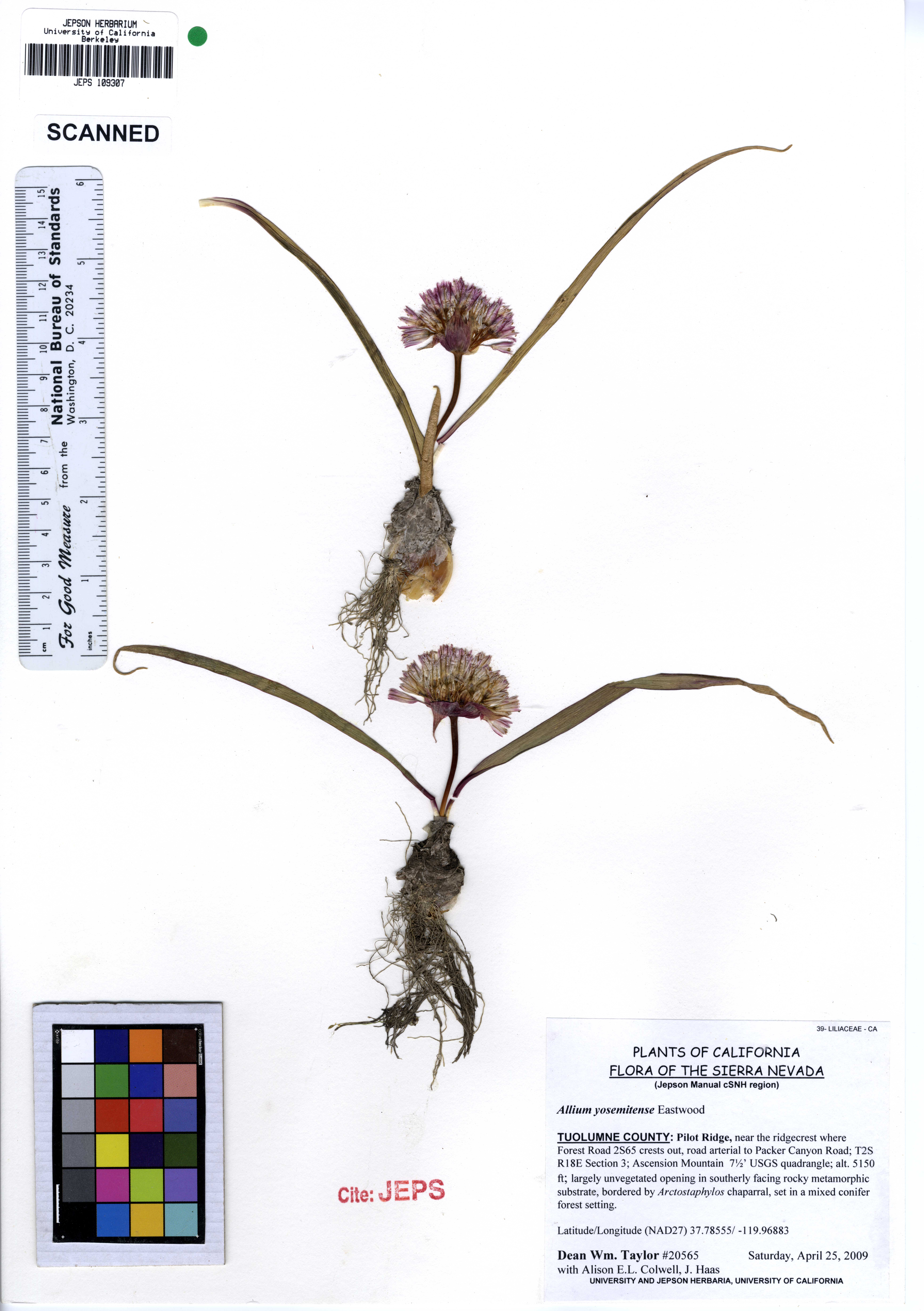

Scientific classification
- Kingdom: Plantae
- Clade: Tracheophytes
- Clade: Angiosperms
- Clade: Monocots
- Order: Asparagales
- Family: Amaryllidaceae
- Subfamily: Allioideae
- Genus: Allium
- Species: A. yosemitense

Binomial name
- Allium yosemitense Eastw.

= Allium yosemitense =

Yosemite onion

Species of flowering plant

Allium yosemitense is a California species of wild onion known by the common name Yosemite onion. Most of the known populations are situated within the boundaries of Yosemite National Park.

== Description ==
Allium yosemitense grows from a bulb two to three centimeters long, producing a scape up to about 23 centimetres (9.1 in) in maximum height. It has two long flat leaves that are usually slightly longer than the scape. The umbel contains up to 50 white or pink flowers, each on a pedicel which may be over 3 centimetres (1.2 in) long.

== Distribution and habitat ==
Allium yosemitense is endemic to the central Sierra Nevada of California. Populations have been recorded in three counties: El Dorado, Mariposa and Tuolumne. Most of the sites are inside Yosemite National Park.

The habitats in which Allium yosemitense can be found include: California interior chaparral and foothill woodlands, Sierra Nevada lower montane forest (Yellow Pine Forest), Mediterranean California Lower Montane Black Oak-Conifer Forest (Mixed Evergreen Forest).

Allium yosemitense is listed by the State of California as Rare, and included in the California Native Plant Society—CNPS Inventory of Rare and Endangered Plants of California.

== See also ==
- List of plants of the Sierra Nevada (U.S.)
