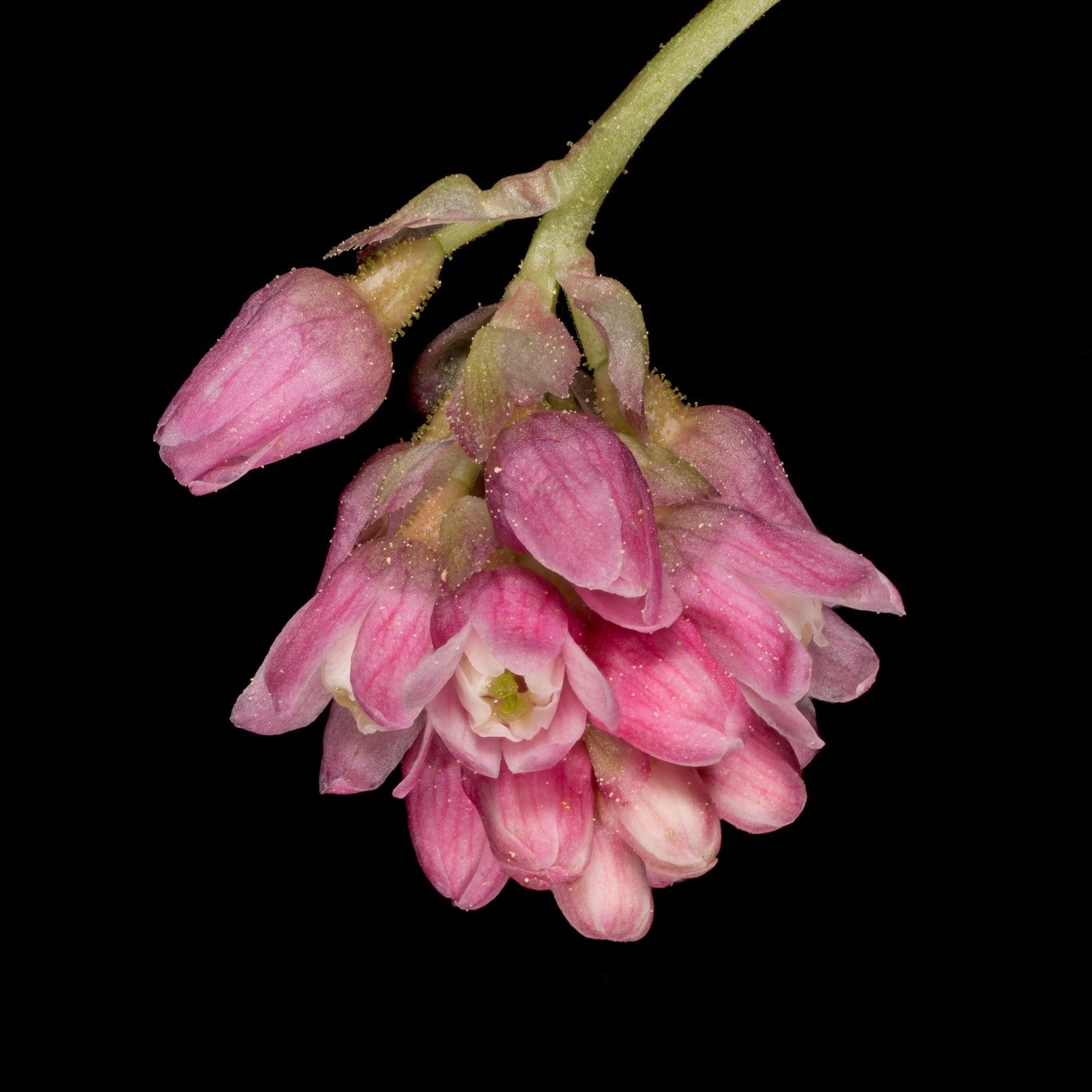

Scientific classification
- Kingdom: Plantae
- Clade: Tracheophytes
- Clade: Angiosperms
- Clade: Eudicots
- Order: Saxifragales
- Family: Grossulariaceae
- Genus: Ribes
- Species: R. nevadense

Binomial name
- Ribes nevadense Kellogg

Synonyms
- List: Ribes nevadaense Kellogg; Ribes nevadaensis Kellogg; Ribes glaucescens Eastw.; Ribes nevadaense var. glaucescens (Eastw.) A. Berger; Ribes nevadaense var. jaegeri A. Berger; Ribes grantii A. Heller; Ribes ascendens var. jasperae Eastw.; Ribes ascendens Eastw.

= Ribes nevadense =

Sierra currant

Species of currant

Ribes nevadense (sometimes spelled R. nevadaense) is a species of currant known by the common names Sierra currant and mountain pink currant.

== Description ==
Ribes nevadense is an erect shrub growing to 1–2 metres (3 1/2–6 1/2 ft) tall. The glandular leaves are up to 8 centimetres (3 1/4 in) long and divided shallowly into 3–5 dully toothed lobes.

The inflorescence is a dense raceme of 8–20 flowers hanging pendent or held erect on the branches. Each flower has opens into a corolla-like array of five pinkish red sepals with five smaller white petals in a tube at the center.

The fruit is an edible blue-black berry under 1 cm wide. It is somewhat waxy in texture and studded with glandular hairs.

== Distribution and habitat ==
Ribes nevadense is native to several mountain ranges in California, including the Peninsular Ranges, Transverse Ranges, Klamath Mountains, and the Sierra Nevada where its distribution extends into western Nevada. It has been found in Oregon, as well. It grows in forest and riparian habitats, at elevations between 910–3,050 m (3,000–10,000 ft).
