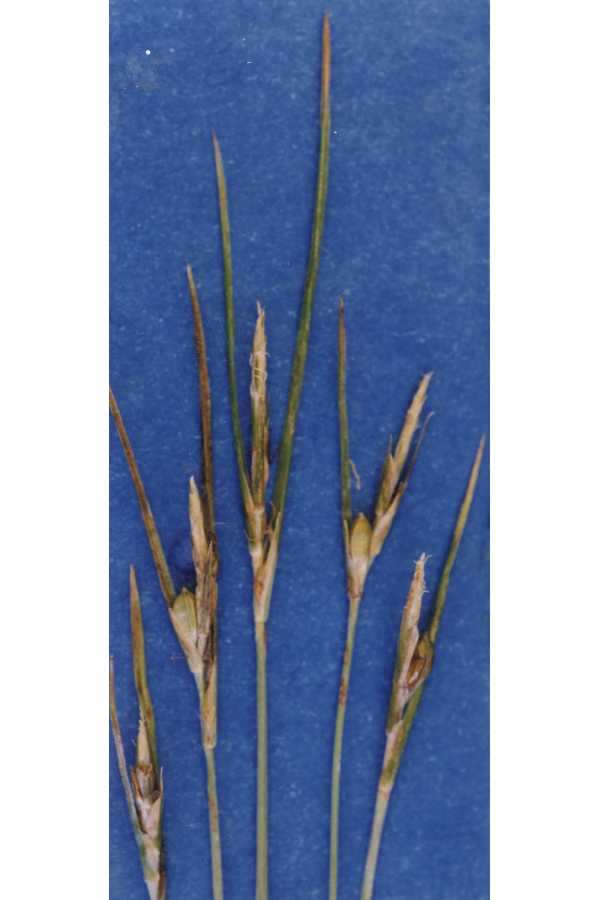

Scientific classification
- Kingdom: Plantae
- Clade: Tracheophytes
- Clade: Angiosperms
- Clade: Monocots
- Clade: Commelinids
- Order: Poales
- Family: Cyperaceae
- Genus: Carex
- Species: C. multicaulis

Binomial name
- Carex multicaulis L.H.Bailey

= Carex multicaulis =

Species of grass-like plant

Carex multicaulis is a species of sedge known by the common name manystem sedge. It is native to California, western Nevada, and southern Oregon, where it grows in chaparral and open forest montane habitats. It can be found in the Sierra Nevada mountains and Cascade mountains.

== Description ==
This reedlike sedge produces clumps of narrow stems up to 50 or 60 centimeters tall, with short, folded or rolled leaves. The inflorescence is a narrow cluster of spike-shaped staminate flowers above a cluster of more rounded pistillate flowers. C. multicaulis prefers dry soils, good drainage and shade.
