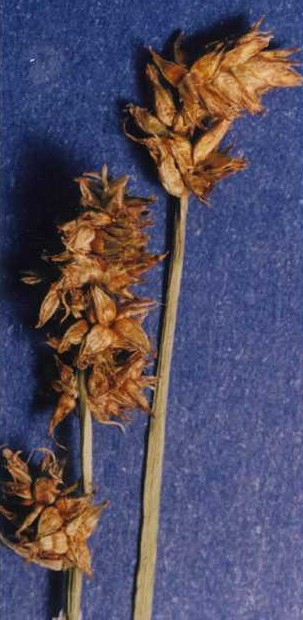

Scientific classification
- Kingdom: Plantae
- Clade: Tracheophytes
- Clade: Angiosperms
- Clade: Monocots
- Clade: Commelinids
- Order: Poales
- Family: Cyperaceae
- Genus: Carex
- Species: C. nervina

Binomial name
- Carex nervina L.H.Bailey

= Carex nervina =

Species of grass-like plant

Carex nervina is a species of sedge known by the common name Sierra sedge.

== Distribution ==
This sedge is native to California, including the Sierra Nevada and San Joaquin Valley, and adjacent parts of Oregon and Nevada, where it grows mainly in mountain meadows.

== Description ==
Carex nervina forms thick clumps of spongy, winged stems up to about 70 centimeters tall. The inflorescence is a dense cluster of a few compact spikes up to 3 centimeters long. The fruit is coated in a shiny green or brown toothed perigynium.
