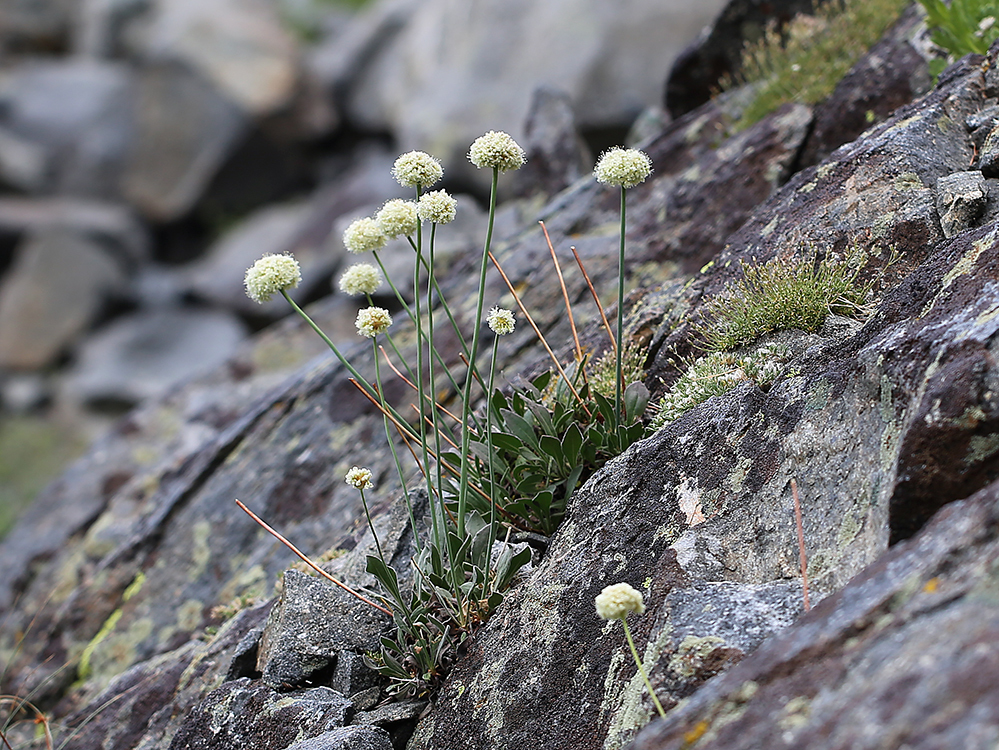

Conservation status
- Vulnerable (NatureServe)

Scientific classification
- Kingdom: Plantae
- Clade: Embryophytes
- Clade: Tracheophytes
- Clade: Angiosperms
- Clade: Eudicots
- Order: Caryophyllales
- Family: Polygonaceae
- Genus: Eriogonum
- Species: E. latens

Binomial name
- Eriogonum latens Jeps.

Synonyms
- Eriogonum elatum subsp. glabrescens S.Stokes; Eriogonum monticola S.Stokes

= Eriogonum latens =

Species of wild buckwheat

Eriogonum latens is a species of wild buckwheat known by the common name Inyo buckwheat. It is native to the western Great Basin region, in the eastern slopes of the Sierra Nevada and the Inyo Mountains of California and the White Mountains, which extend just into western Nevada. It is an uncommon member of the flora in the sagebrush and woodlands of these mountains, where it grows in granitic sandy soils.

== Description ==
Eriogonum latens is a perennial herb growing from a woody caudex in a basal patch of rounded to oval green leaves up to about 3 centimeters long on short petioles. The inflorescence arises on an erect, naked scape, or flowering stem, and bears many whitish or yellowish flowers in a spherical cluster.

== Taxonomy ==
Eriogonum latens was scientifically described and named by Willis Linn Jepson in 1914. It is part of the genus Eriogonum within the Polygonaceae family. The species has two heterotypic synonyms, Eriogonum monticola and Eriogonum elatum subsp. glabrescens, both published in 1936 by Susan Gabriella Stokes (1868–1954).

== Range ==
According to the Natural Resources Conservation Service Inyo buckwheat is native to just three counties; Inyo and Mono counties in California and Esmeralda County, Nevada. There it grows in the central Sierra Nevada, the White, Inyo, and Panamint Mountains.
