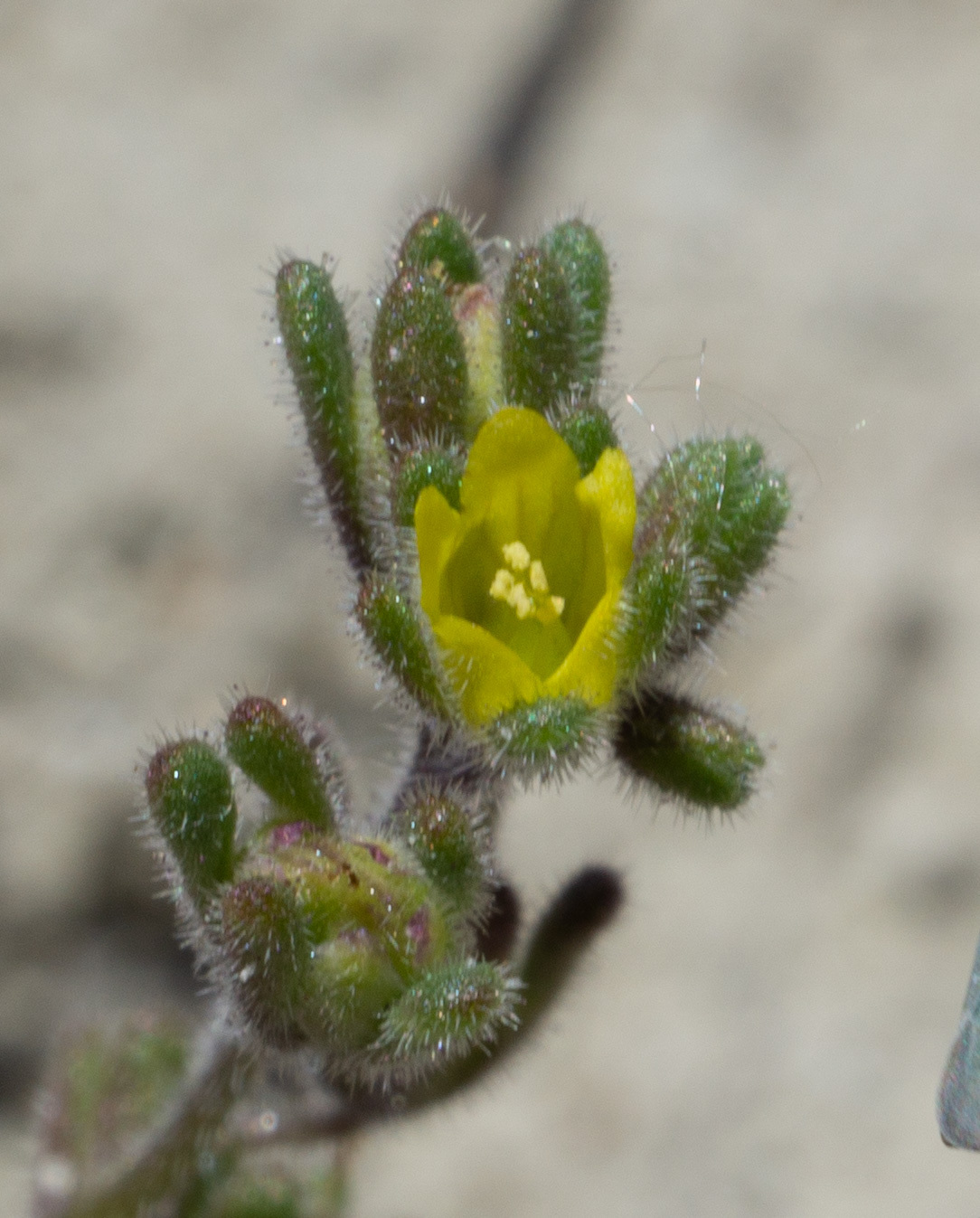

Conservation status
- Imperiled (NatureServe)

Scientific classification
- Kingdom: Plantae
- Clade: Tracheophytes
- Clade: Angiosperms
- Clade: Eudicots
- Clade: Asterids
- Order: Boraginales
- Family: Hydrophyllaceae
- Genus: Phacelia
- Species: P. inyoensis

Binomial name
- Phacelia inyoensis (J.F.Macbr.) J.T.Howell

= Phacelia inyoensis =

Species of plant

Phacelia inyoensis, the common name Inyo phacelia, is an uncommon species of phacelia. It is endemic to California, in Inyo and Mono Counties, often within the Inyo National Forest.

It is known only from the Eastern Sierra Nevada, Inyo Mountains, and White Mountains, and valley meadows between them. It grows in meadows on alkaline soils.

Description

Phacelia inyoensis is an annual herb growing up to about 10 centimeters high with a basal array of lobed rounded or oval leaves on short petioles. It is glandular and coated in stiff hairs.

The inflorescence is a cyme of bell-shaped flowers each only 2 or 3 millimeters long. Unlike many phacelias which have blooms in shades of purple and blue, this species has light yellow flowers.
