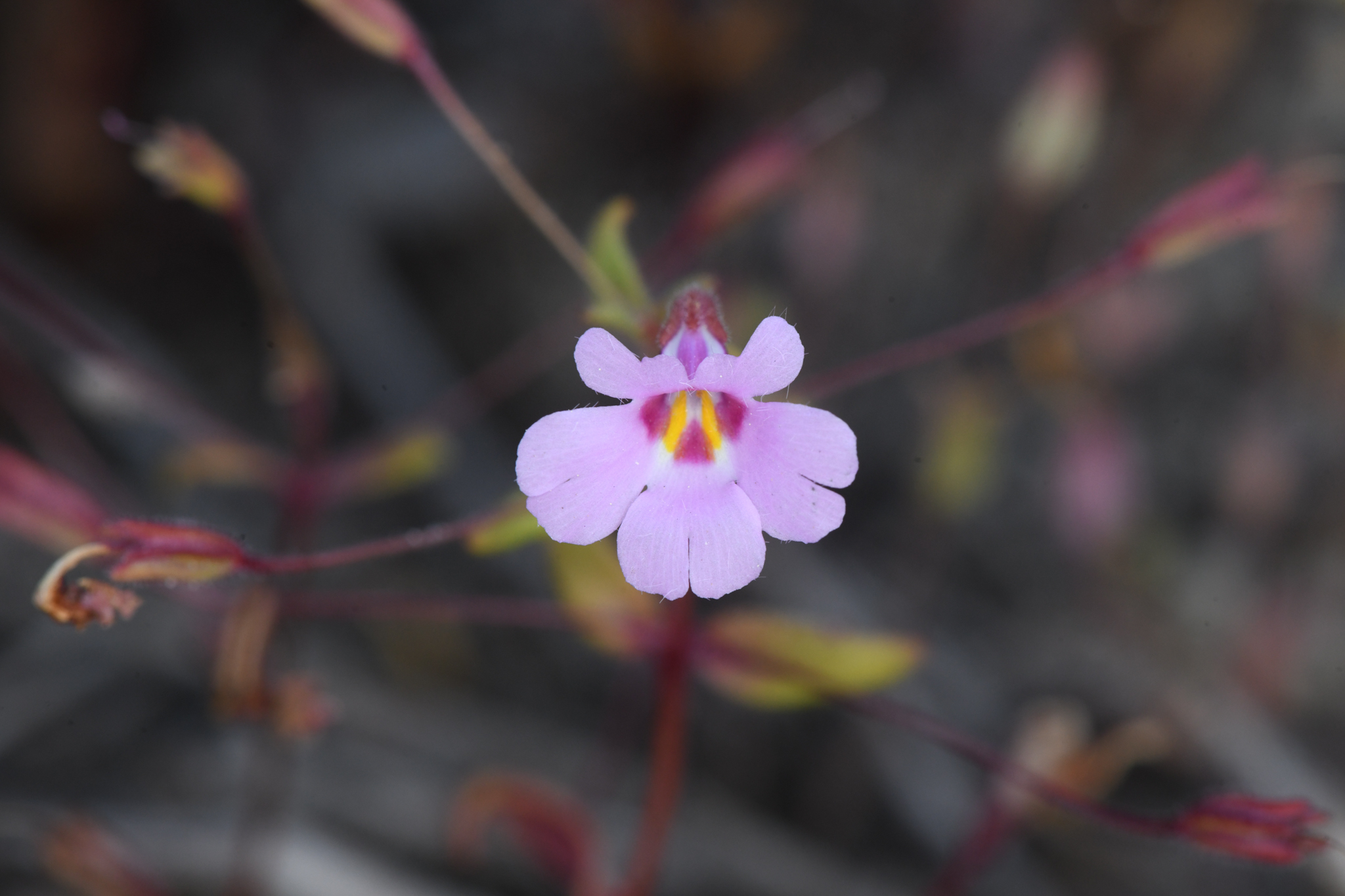
- Sierra National Forest, 2023

Conservation status
- Imperiled (NatureServe)

Scientific classification
- Kingdom: Plantae
- Clade: Embryophytes
- Clade: Tracheophytes
- Clade: Angiosperms
- Clade: Eudicots
- Clade: Asterids
- Order: Lamiales
- Family: Phrymaceae
- Genus: Erythranthe
- Species: E. gracilipes

Binomial name
- Erythranthe gracilipes (B.L.Rob.) N.S.Fraga

Synonyms
- Mimulus gracilipes B.L.Rob.

= Erythranthe gracilipes =

Species of flowering plant

Erythranthe gracilipes is an uncommon species of monkeyflower known by the common name slenderstalk monkeyflower. It was formerly known as Mimulus gracilipes.

== Distribution ==
It is endemic to California, where it is known only from the western foothills of the central Sierra Nevada. It grows in disturbed and burned areas on decomposed granite soils from 500 to 1300 meters elevation.

== Description ==
This annual herb has a scattered distribution, sometimes only growing after a habitat disturbance such as wildfire. This petite wildflower grows no taller than about 8 centimeters. The fuzzy stem has a few pairs of oppositely arranged reddish-green oval leaves each up to about a centimeter long.

The tubular throat of the flower is encapsulated in a hairy red calyx of sepals. The pink flower is no more than a centimeter long and wide. The upper lip has two notched lobes and the wider lower lip has three.
