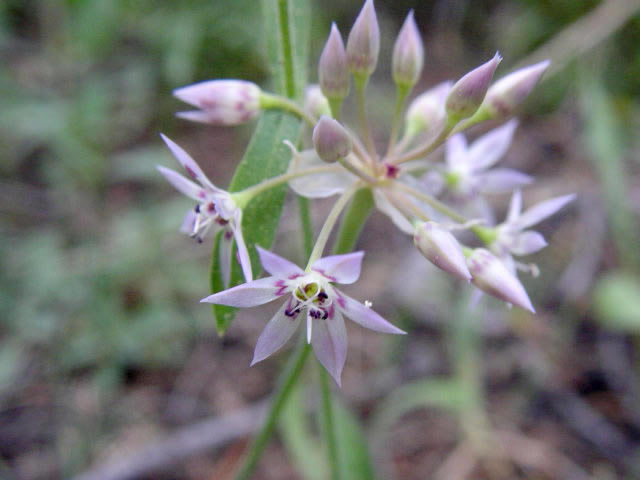

Conservation status
- Apparently Secure (NatureServe)

Scientific classification
- Kingdom: Plantae
- Clade: Tracheophytes
- Clade: Angiosperms
- Clade: Monocots
- Order: Asparagales
- Family: Amaryllidaceae
- Subfamily: Allioideae
- Genus: Allium
- Subgenus: A. subg. Amerallium
- Species: A. campanulatum

Binomial name
- Allium campanulatum S.Wats.

Synonyms
- Allium austinae M.E. Jones; Allium bidwelliae S.Wats.; Allium bullardii Davidson; Allium campanulatum var. bidwelliae (S.Wats.) Jeps.; Allium tenellum Davidson

= Allium campanulatum =

Dusky onion

Species of flowering plant

Allium campanulatum is a species of wild onion known by the common name dusky onion or Sierra onion. This is a flowering plant native to the western United States from southeastern Washington and northern Oregon to southern California, and western Nevada. The dusky onion grows in foothills and mountains, especially in dry areas, such as chaparral habitats.

== Description ==
The dusky onion, Allium campanulatum, grows from a gray-brown bulb one to two centimeters wide which may extend tiny rhizomes and produce small daughter bulblets. It rises on a stout stem and has usually two long, thin leaves that wither before the flowers bloom. On top of the stem is an inflorescence of 10 to 50 flowers. Each flower is half a centimeter to one centimeter wide and is pink, purple, or less often white, and each tepal has a dark-colored base. The tepals are variable in shape, from narrow and very pointy to spade-shaped. Anthers are purple; pollen yellow. Flowers bloom May to August.

== See also ==
- California chaparral and woodlands
