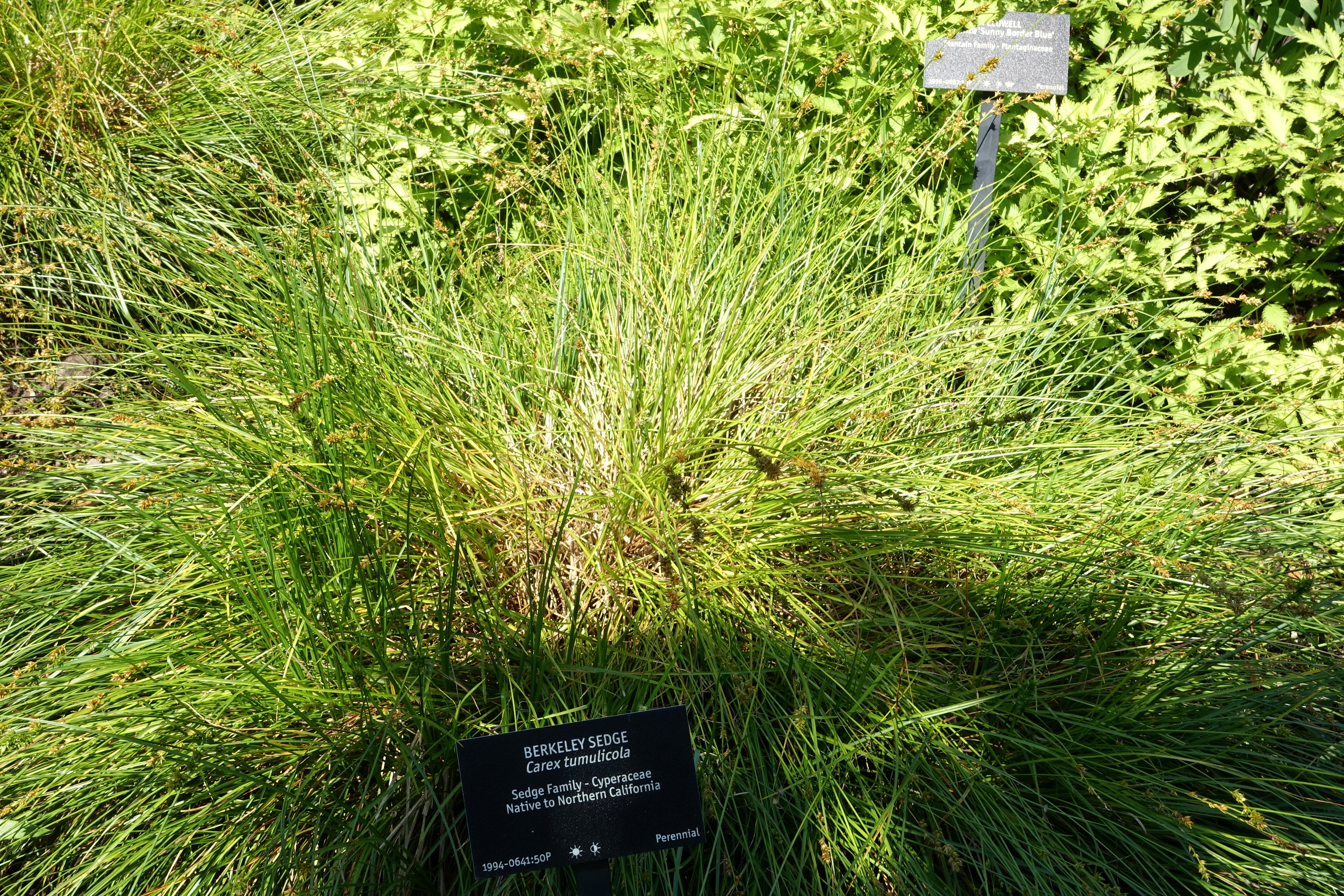

Scientific classification
- Kingdom: Plantae
- Clade: Tracheophytes
- Clade: Angiosperms
- Clade: Monocots
- Clade: Commelinids
- Order: Poales
- Family: Cyperaceae
- Genus: Carex
- Subgenus: Carex subg. Vignea
- Section: Carex sect. Phaestoglochin
- Species: C. tumulicola

Binomial name
- Carex tumulicola Mack.

= Carex tumulicola =

Species of grass-like plant

Carex tumulicola, the splitawn sedge foothill sedge, or previously Berkeley sedge, is a sedge member of the family Cyperaceae.

== Description ==
Carex tumulicola is found in western North America, from British Columbia to California,. It has a height and width of 2 feet (61 cm), and is slowly spreading. It is found in meadows and open woodlands, below 1,200 metres (3,900 ft).

== Cultivation ==
Carex tumulicola is cultivated in the horticulture trade and widely available as a (grass-like) ornamental grass for: traditional and natural landscape drought-tolerant water-conserving lawns and small 'garden-meadows,' native plant and habitat gardens; and various types of municipal, commercial, and agency sustainable landscape and restoration projects.

=== Similar species ===
Plants grown in the nursery trade are often mislabeled with botanical and common names of similar appearing Carex spp. - while the subtle distinctions are currently [2010] reclarified-assigned by botanists. For example, one considered the species to be closely related to Carex hookeriana, and others to Carex pansa.
