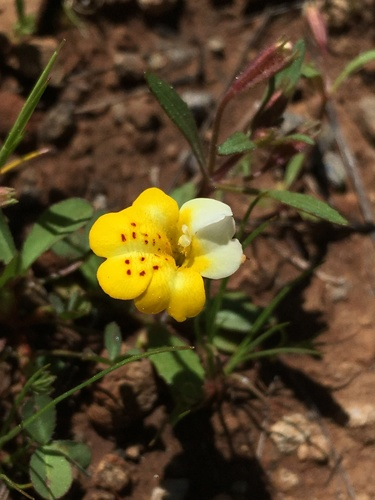

Conservation status
- Apparently Secure (NatureServe)

Scientific classification
- Kingdom: Plantae
- Clade: Embryophytes
- Clade: Tracheophytes
- Clade: Angiosperms
- Clade: Eudicots
- Clade: Asterids
- Order: Lamiales
- Family: Phrymaceae
- Genus: Erythranthe
- Species: E. bicolor

Binomial name
- Erythranthe bicolor (Hartw. ex Benth.) G.L.Nesom & N.S.Fraga

Synonyms
- Mimulus bicolor Hartw. ex Benth.; Mimulus prattenii Durand

= Erythranthe bicolor =

Species of flowering plant

Erythranthe bicolor, the yellow and white monkeyflower, is a species of flowering plant in the lopseed family (Phrymaceae). It is endemic to California, United States. It was formerly known as Mimulus bicolor.

== Description ==
It is an annual herb producing a hairy, erect stem 4 to 27 centimeters tall. The linear to nearly oval leaves are each up to 3 centimeters long and arranged in opposite pairs about the stem. The tubular base of the flower is surrounded by a reddish-green freckled calyx of sepals with small, pointed lobes. The flower corolla is one to two centimeters long and divided into two lips. These vary in color but often the upper lip is white and the lower is yellow. The upper lip has two lobes and the lower has three. Each lobe has two sub-lobes at its tip.

== Distribution and habitat ==
The yellow and white monkeyflower grows in mountains and foothills from the Klamath Range through the Sierra to the Tehachapi Mountains. It grows in moist or wet areas, often on clay soils.
