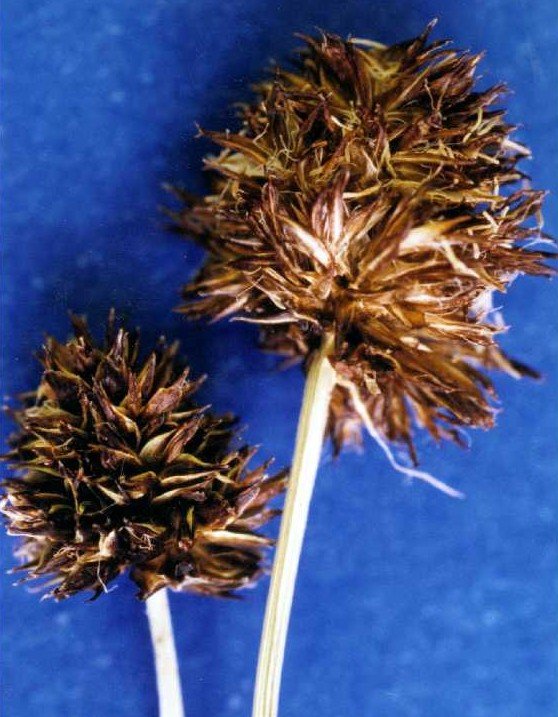

Scientific classification
- Kingdom: Plantae
- Clade: Tracheophytes
- Clade: Angiosperms
- Clade: Monocots
- Clade: Commelinids
- Order: Poales
- Family: Cyperaceae
- Genus: Carex
- Species: C. vernacula

Binomial name
- Carex vernacula L.H.Bailey

= Carex vernacula =

Species of grass-like plant

Carex vernacula is a species of sedge known by the common name native sedge.

== Distribution ==
This sedge is native to the western United States, where it grows in moist mountain habitat in alpine climates and higher subalpine elevations. It often arises in cold pools of snowmelt.

== Description ==
Carex vernacula produces clumps of erect stems 30 to 40 centimeters in maximum height, and sometimes forms colonies connected by rhizome networks. The inflorescence is a dense, tangled clump of flower spikes. The fruit is coated in a green-edged brown perigynium.
