= Erigeron aequifolius =

Scientific classification
- Kingdom: Plantae
- Clade: Tracheophytes
- Clade: Angiosperms
- Clade: Eudicots
- Clade: Asterids
- Order: Asterales
- Family: Asteraceae
- Genus: Erigeron
- Species: E. aequifolius

Binomial name
- Erigeron aequifolius H.M.Hall

Species of flowering plant

Erigeron aequifolius is a rare species of flowering plant in the family Asteraceae known by the common names Hall's daisy and Hall's fleabane.

== Distribution ==
It is endemic to California, where it is known from fewer than 20 locations in the southern High Sierra Nevada of Mariposa, Fresno, Kern, and Tulare Counties. It grows in woodlands and coniferous forests.

== Description ==
Erigeron aequifolius is a small perennial herb growing a hairy, glandular stem up to about 20 centimeters (8 inches) tall from a woody caudex and taproot. The small leaves are equal in size and evenly spaced along the stem. The inflorescence is a usually solitary flower head at the tip of the stem. The head contains many yellow disc florets surrounded by a fringe of ray florets which are white when new and turn blue as they dry. The fruit is a tiny achene with a pappus of bristles.
