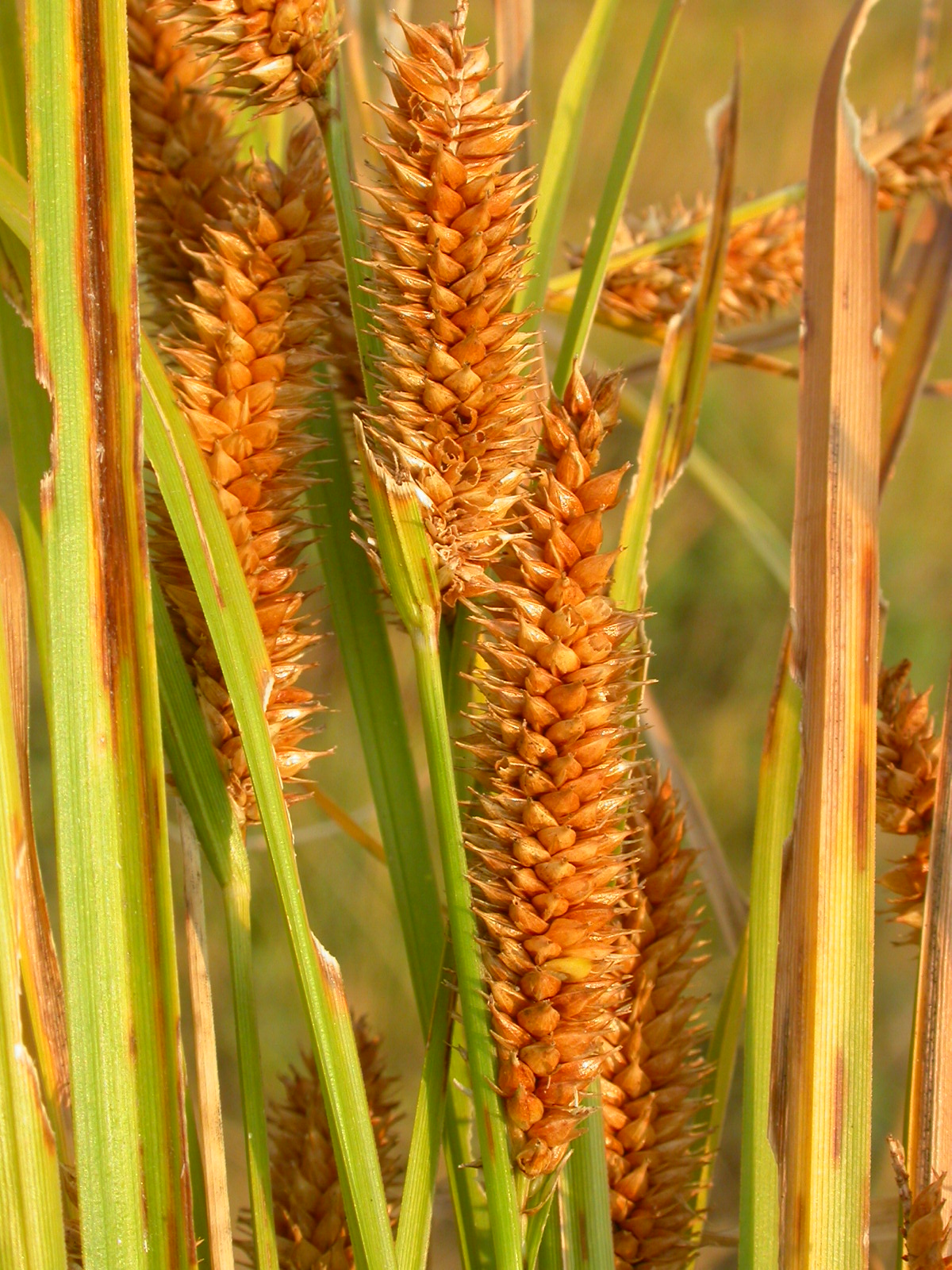

Conservation status
- Least Concern (IUCN 3.1)

Scientific classification
- Kingdom: Plantae
- Clade: Tracheophytes
- Clade: Angiosperms
- Clade: Monocots
- Clade: Commelinids
- Order: Poales
- Family: Cyperaceae
- Genus: Carex
- Subgenus: Carex subg. Carex
- Section: Carex sect. Vesicariae
- Species: C. utriculata

Binomial name
- Carex utriculata Boott

Synonyms
- List: Carex ampullacea var. utriculata (Boott) J.Carey; Carex inflata var. utriculata (Boott) Druce; Carex rostrata subsp. utriculata (Boott) Asch. & Graebn.; Carex rostrata var. utriculata (Boott) L.H.Bailey; Carex vesicaria var. utriculata (Boott) Dewey; Carex bullata subsp. laevirostris (Blytt ex Fr.) Fr.; Carex bullata var. laevirostris Blytt ex Fr.; Carex laevirostris (Blytt ex Fr.) Andersson; Carex laevirostris f. gracilior Kük.; Carex rhynchophysa Fisch., C.A.Mey. & Avé-Lall.; Carex rhynchophysa subsp. glauca Charit.; Carex rhynchophysa subsp. lucida Charit.; Carex robusta F.Nyl.; Carex rostrata f. minor (Boott) Kük.; Carex utriculata var. globosa Olney; Carex utriculata var. minor Boott; Carex utriculata var. sparsiflora Dewey; Carex ventricosa Franch.; Carex vesicaria subsp. lacustris Th.Fr.

= Carex utriculata =

Species of plant in the sedge family

Carex utriculata is a species of sedge known as Northwest Territory sedge, common beaked sedge or common yellow lake sedge.

== Distribution and habitat ==
This sedge is native to the northern half of North America, including most all of Canada and the northern United States, and down to montane California. It is also found in northern Europe and northern Asia. It is a common plant in many types of wetland habitat.

== Description ==
Carex utriculata produces stems exceeding 1 m (3 ft 3 in) in maximum height from a thick network of long rhizomes. The inflorescence is a cylindrical mass of flowers up to about 40 cm (16 in) long with an accompanying leaf-like bract which is generally longer than the flower spike. Each inflorescence bears up to 200 developing fruits, each enclosed in a shiny green, golden, or brown perigynium. Carex utriculata was once considered a variety of Carex rostrata (Carex rostrata var. utriculata).

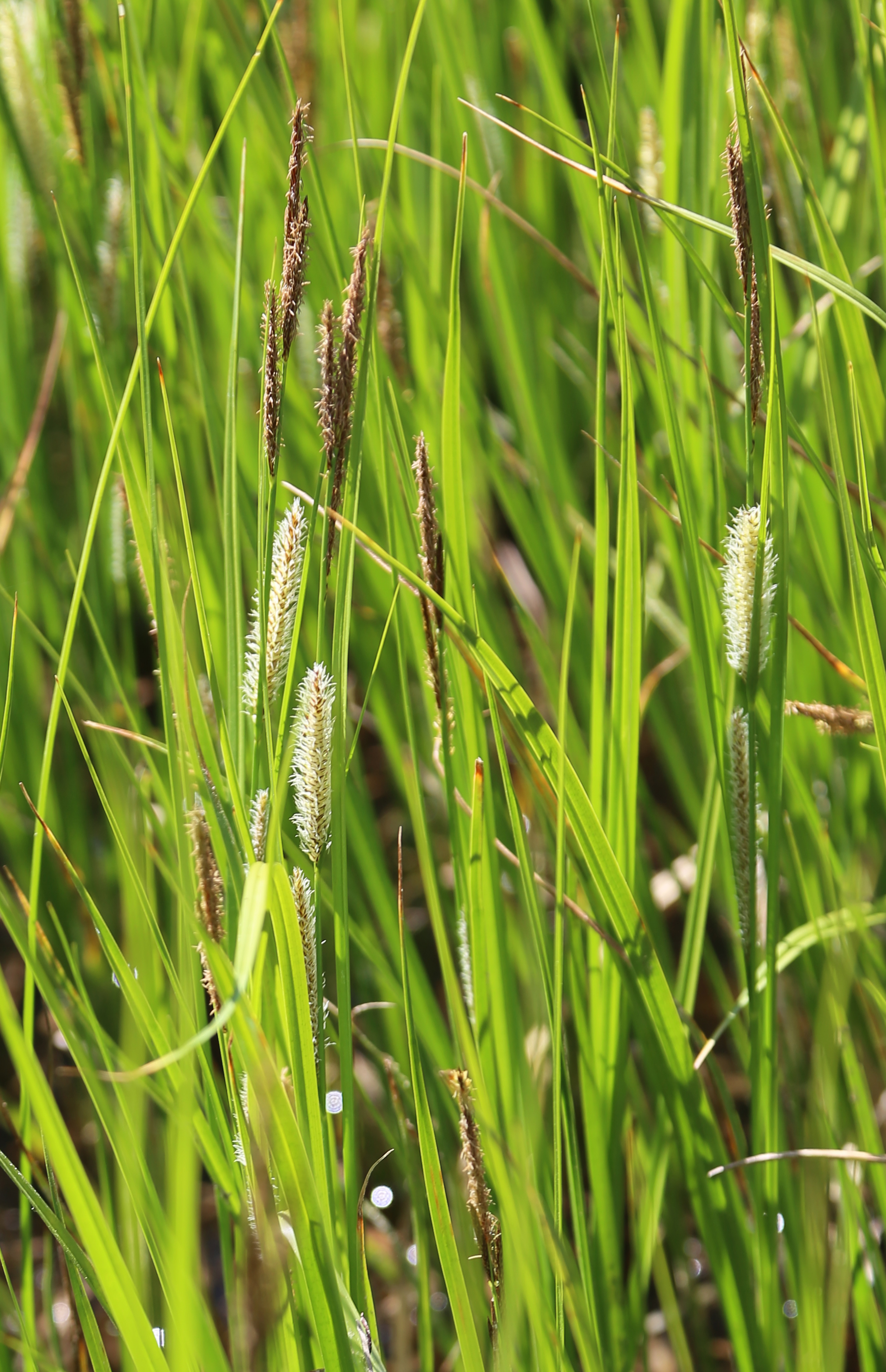
Early-season, male above female spikes

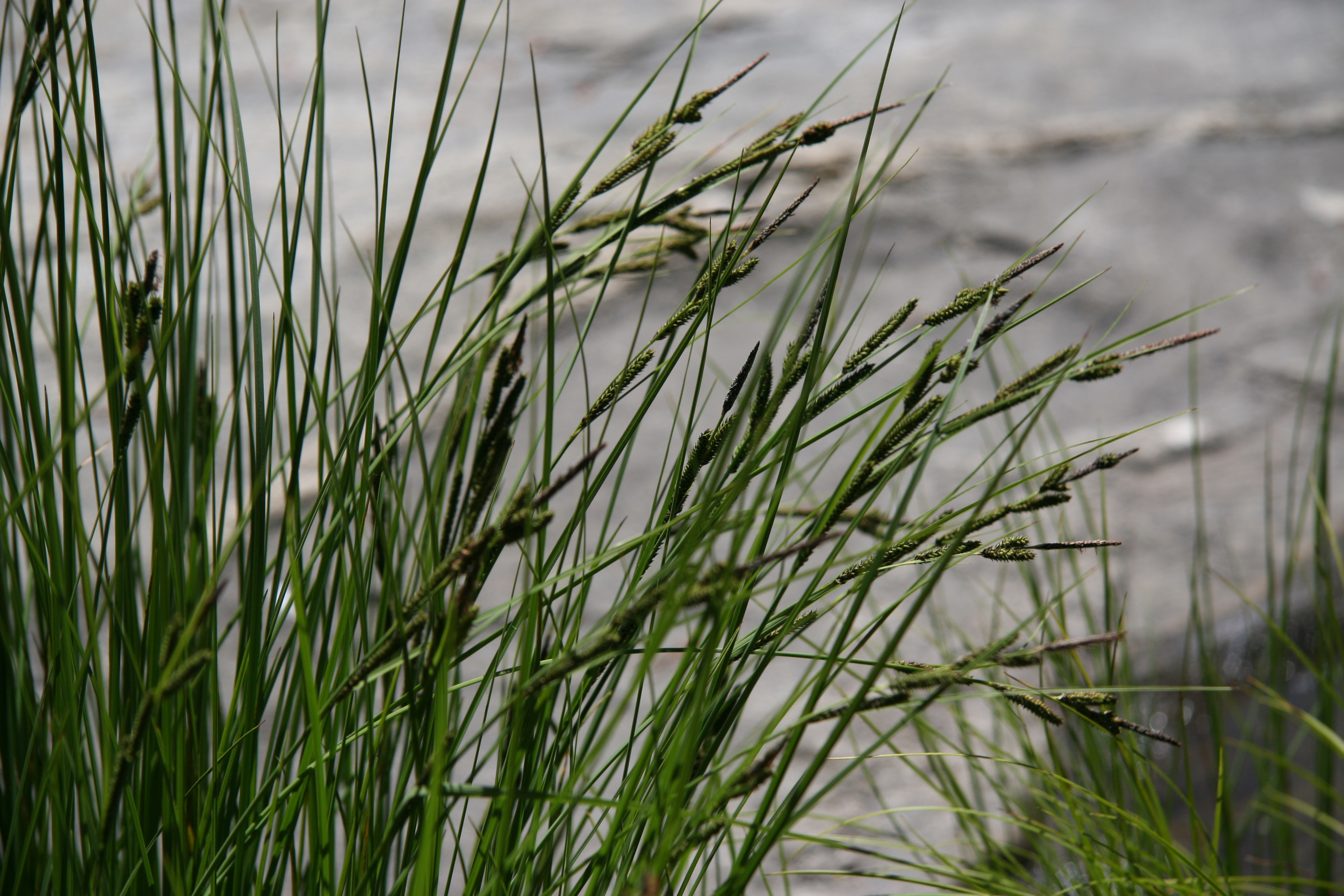
At Hamilton Lake edge, Sierra Nevada
