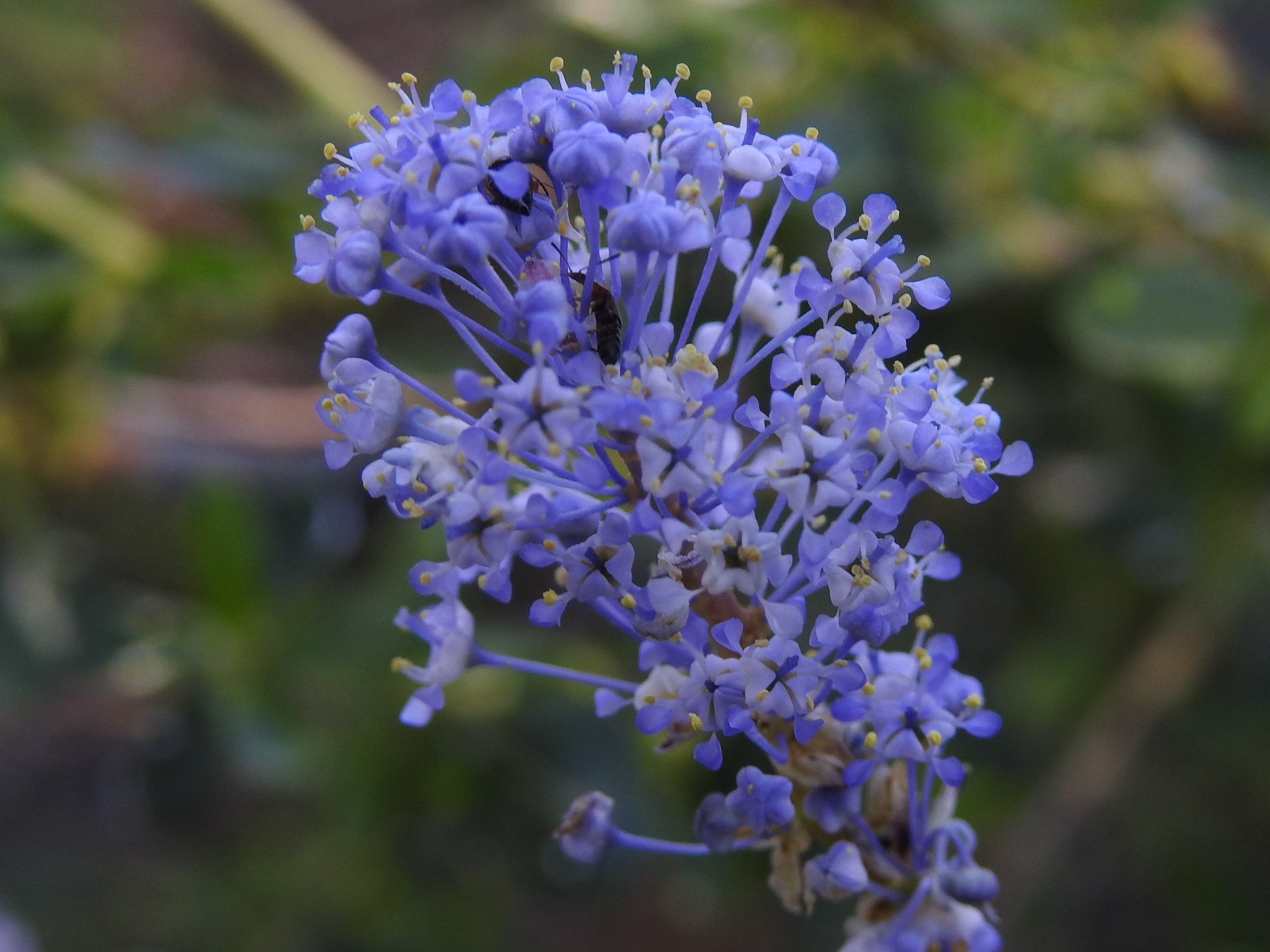

Conservation status
- Vulnerable (NatureServe)

Scientific classification
- Kingdom: Plantae
- Clade: Tracheophytes
- Clade: Angiosperms
- Clade: Eudicots
- Clade: Rosids
- Order: Rosales
- Family: Rhamnaceae
- Genus: Ceanothus
- Species: C. parvifolius

Binomial name
- Ceanothus parvifolius (S.Wats.) Trel.

= Ceanothus parvifolius =

Species of flowering plant

Ceanothus parvifolius is a species of shrub in the family Rhamnaceae known by the common name littleleaf ceanothus or littleleaf whitethorn. This deciduous plant is characterized by its blue flowers and flat topped habit, and is endemic to the Sierra Nevada of California, where it grows on mountain flats and coniferous forest.

== Description ==
This plant is a spreading shrub, growing to a maximum height of just over a meter, forming a wide bush. The twigs are thin, green and quite glabrous. The leaves are alternately arranged and deciduous, with scale-like stipules. The leaves are 8 to 21 mm long, 3 to 12 mm wide, mainly oval in shape and smooth-edged, sometimes with a few tiny teeth near the tip. Both sides of the leaves are generally glabrous, lacking hairs. The raceme to panicle-like inflorescences are clusters 4 to 9 cm long of flowers in various shades of blue. The fruit is a 3-lobed smooth capsule a few millimeters long. Flowering is from May to July.

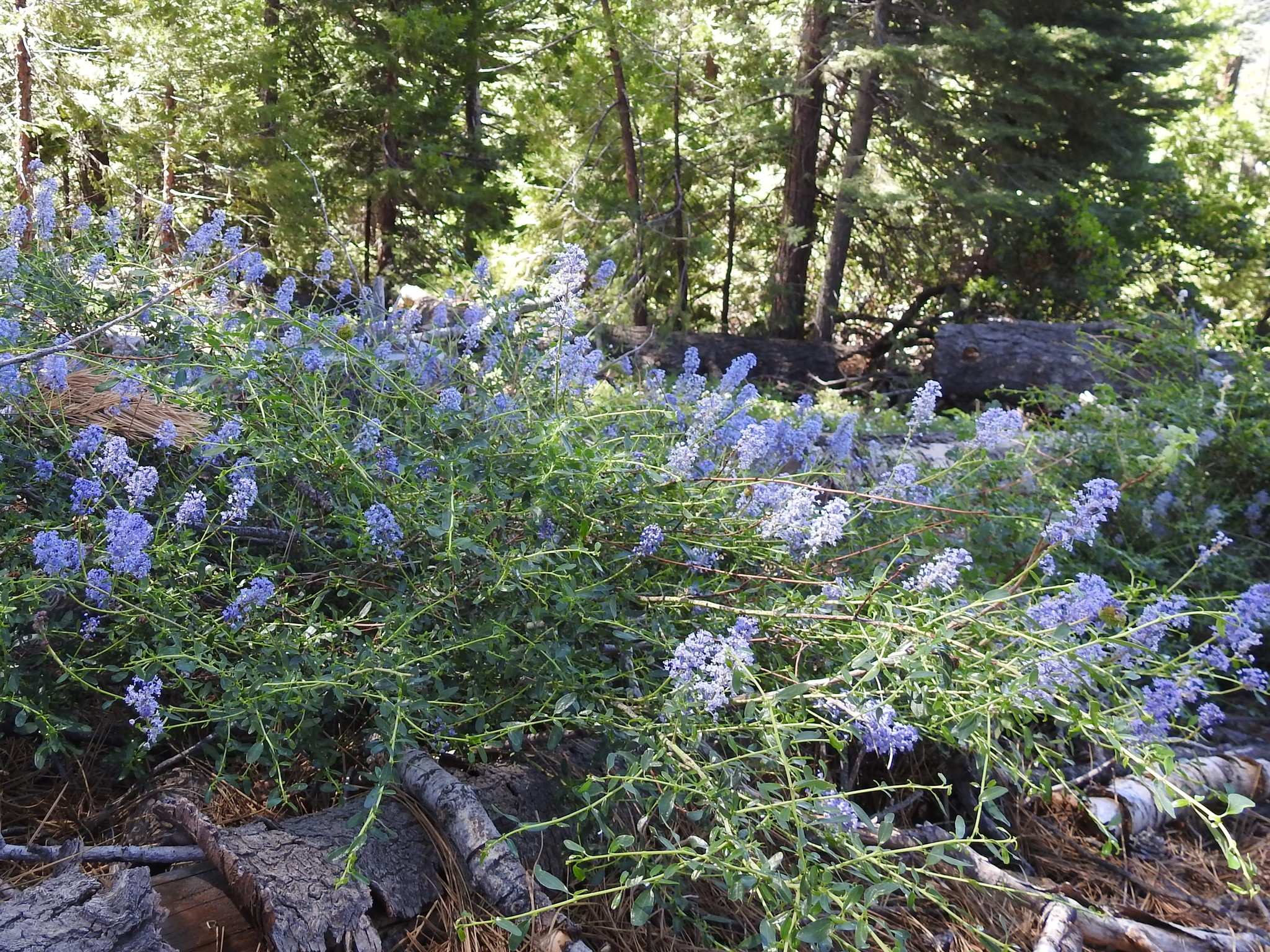
The plant in characteristic spreading habit

=== Characteristics ===
The twigs of this species are flexible, and are not thornlike as compared with Ceanothus cordulatus. There may be 1 to 3 ribs at the base of each leaf, and the upper surface of the leaf is shiny. This species comes close to Ceanothus integerrimus, but differs in its dwarf-like, spreading and often flat-topped habit, its blue flowers as opposed to white, and its much smaller leaves. Putative hybrids with C. cordulatus have been reported.

== Distribution and habitat ==
This species is distributed on the western slope of the Sierra Nevada of California from Plumas County south to Tulare County. It occurs primarily on open sites, slopes and flats and within coniferous forests from an elevation of 1255 to 2220 meters.
