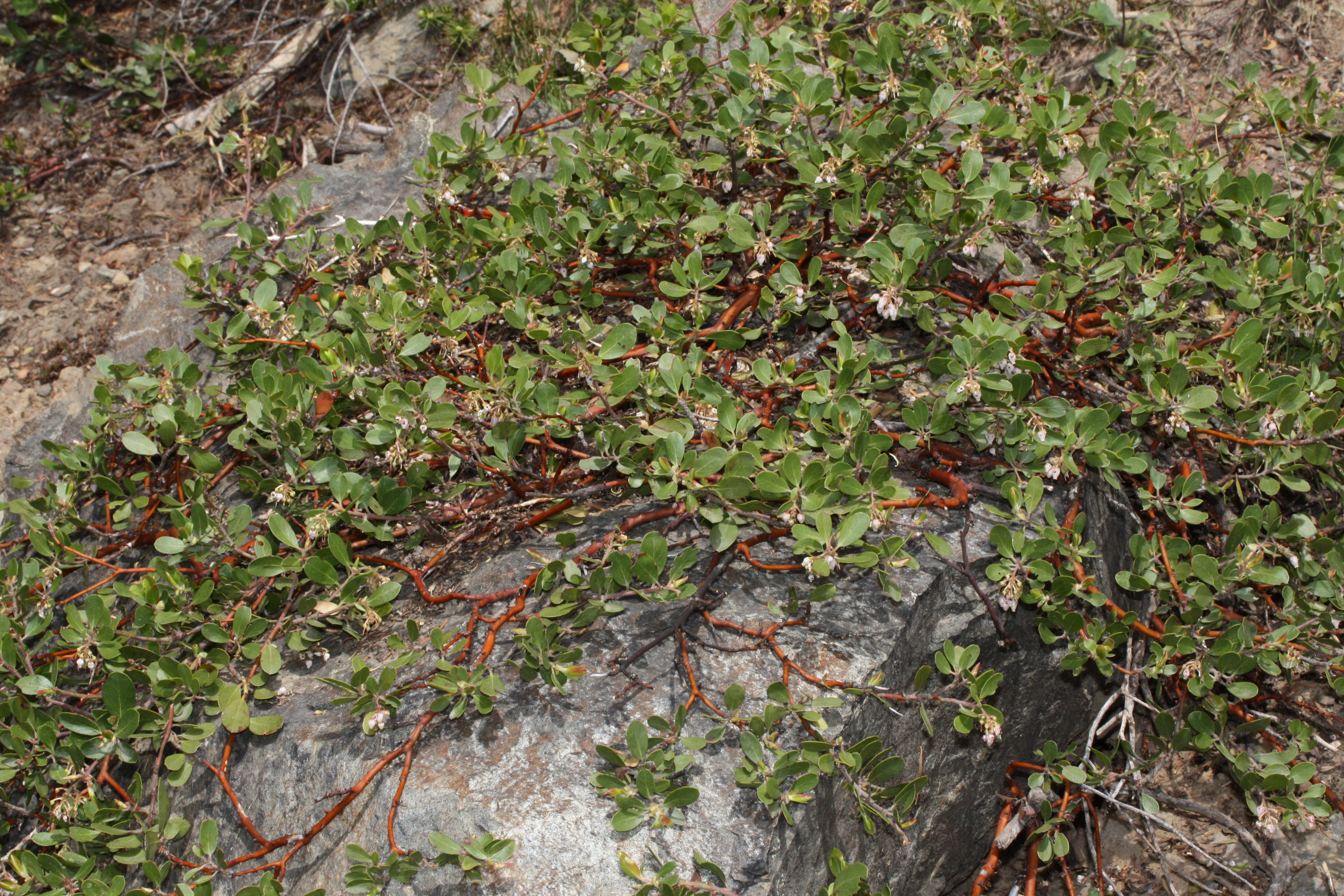
- Wenatchee Mountains

Scientific classification
- Kingdom: Plantae
- Clade: Tracheophytes
- Clade: Angiosperms
- Clade: Eudicots
- Clade: Asterids
- Order: Ericales
- Family: Ericaceae
- Genus: Arctostaphylos
- Species: A. nevadensis

Binomial name
- Arctostaphylos nevadensis A.Gray

= Arctostaphylos nevadensis =

Species of flowering plant

Arctostaphylos nevadensis, commonly known as pinemat manzanita, is a species of manzanita native to western North America.

== Description ==
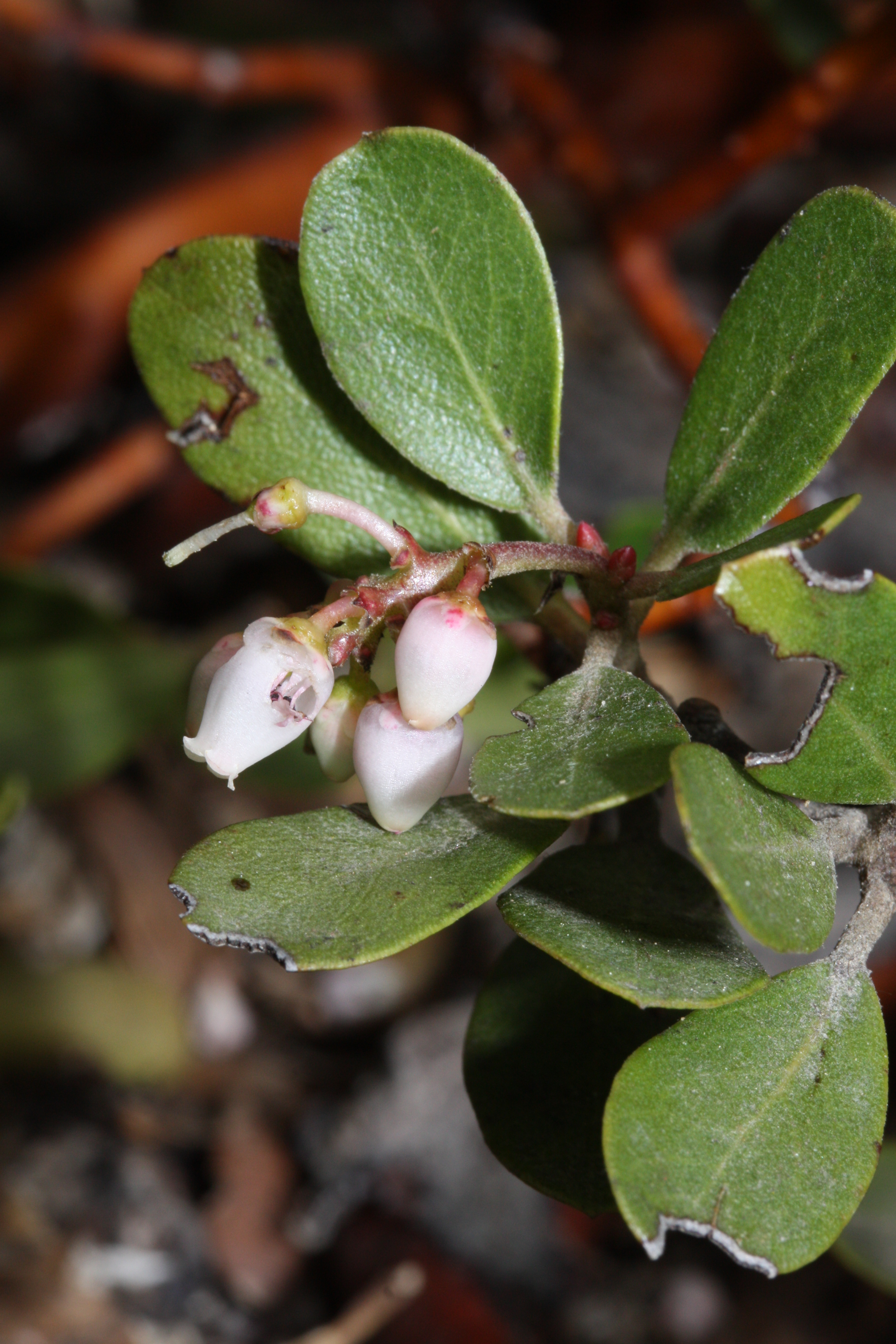
Flower and foliage

Arctostaphylos nevadensis is a short, spreading shrub forming mats, tangles, or mounds less than half a meter tall. The larger branches have dull red bark and the twigs are generally woolly. The leaves are bright green and shiny, with few hairs especially along the edges. They measure 1 to 3 centimetres (1/2 to 1 1/4 in) in length. The shrub blooms in spherical clusters of urn-shaped whitish manzanita flowers. The fruit is a spherical drupe about 7 millimetres (1/4 in) wide.

== Distribution and habitat ==
Arctostaphylos nevadensis is native to western North America from Washington to California, where it grows in the coniferous forests of the inland and coastal mountain ranges. It is a dominant shrub in the mountain understory chaparral in many areas.

== Cultivation ==
This species is cultivated as a chaparral landscaping plant and it is used to stabilize soil against erosion on mountain slopes.

== See also ==
- California chaparral and woodlands
