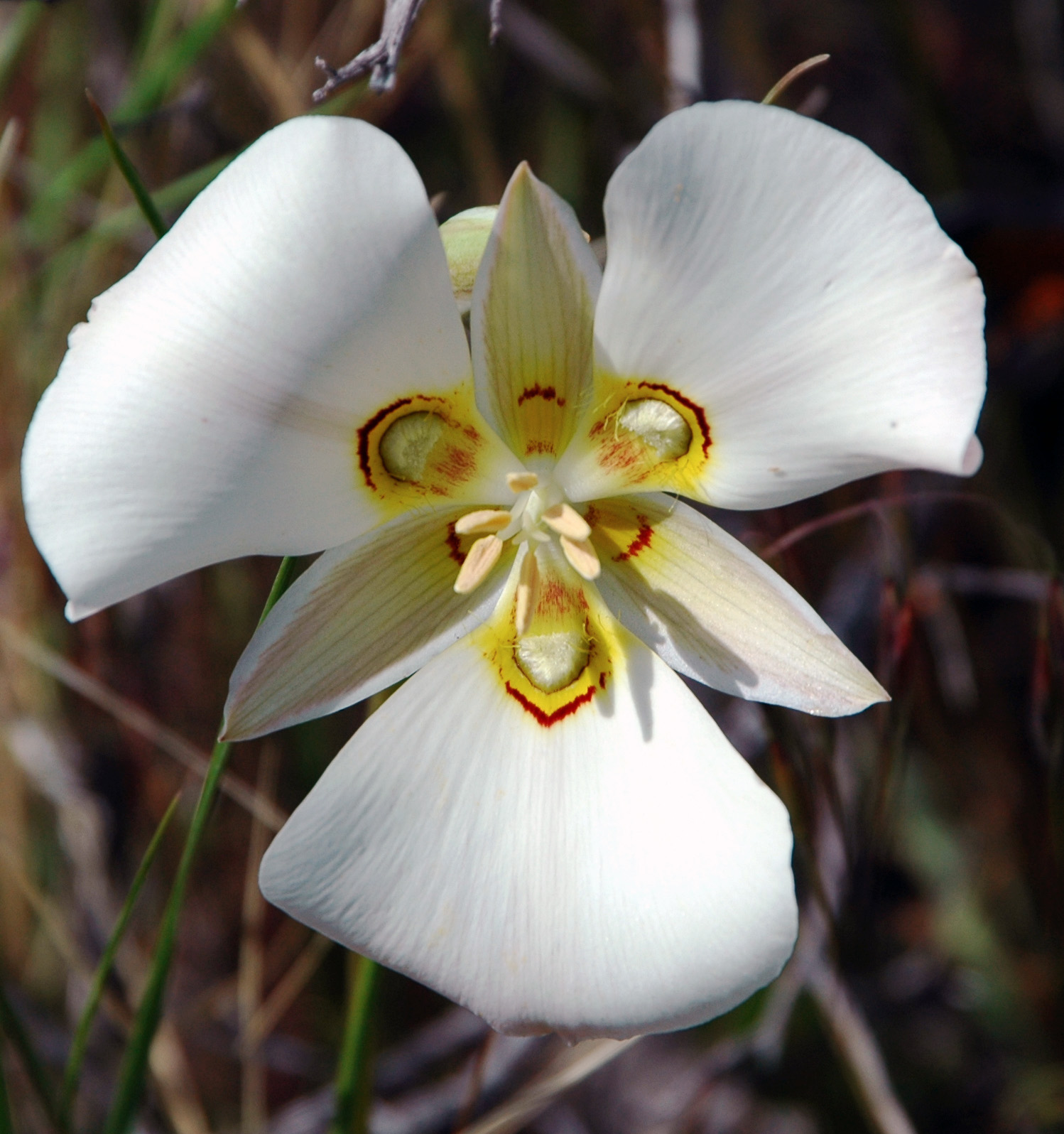

Conservation status
- Secure (NatureServe)

Scientific classification
- Kingdom: Plantae
- Clade: Tracheophytes
- Clade: Angiosperms
- Clade: Monocots
- Order: Liliales
- Family: Liliaceae
- Genus: Calochortus
- Species: C. nuttallii

Binomial name
- Calochortus nuttallii Torr.

Synonyms
- Calochortus luteus Nutt.; Calochortus rhodothecus Clokey; Calochortus watsonii M.E.Jones

= Calochortus nuttallii =

Sego lily

Plant species in the lily family

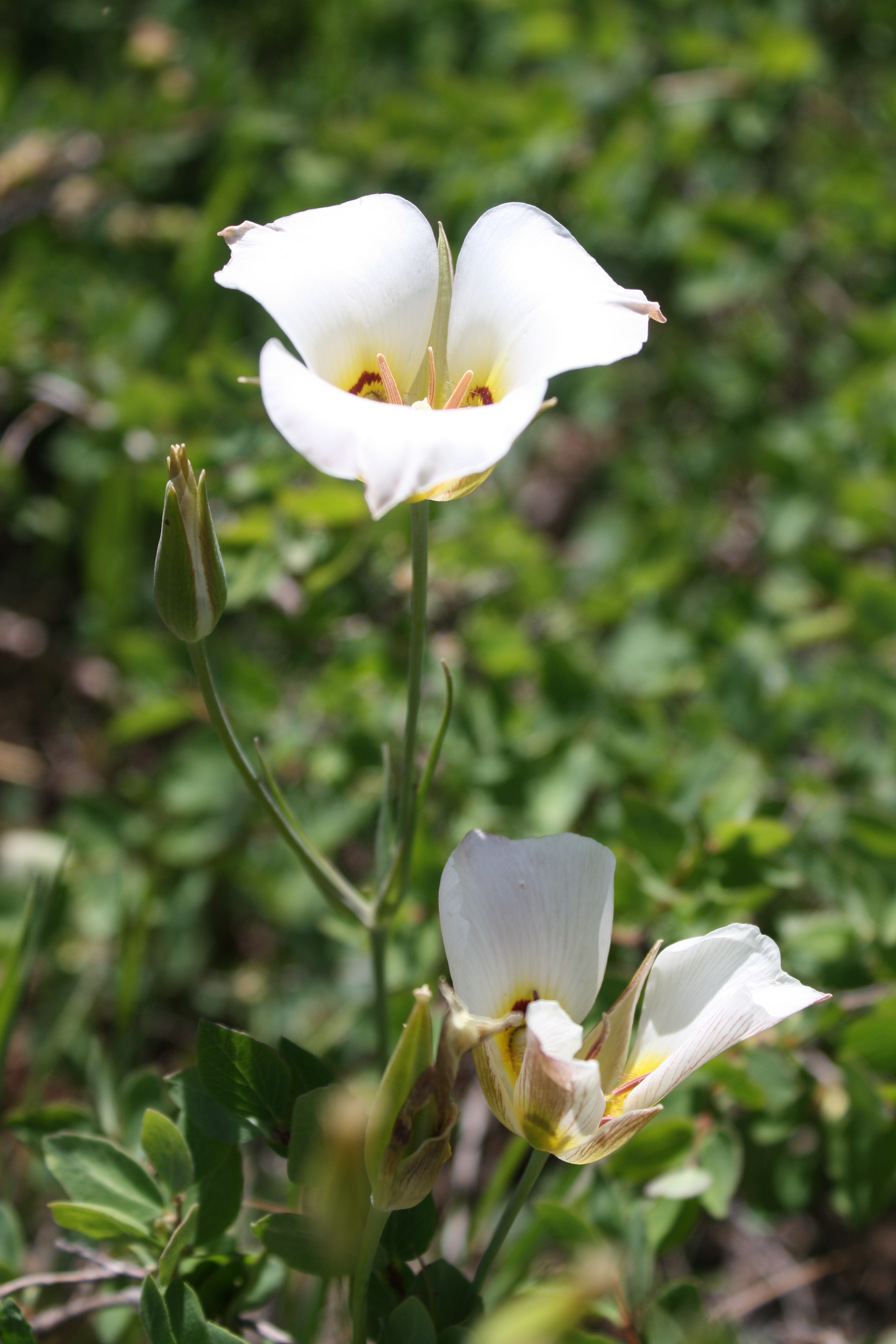
Near Kolob Canyon in Zion National Park, Utah

Calochortus nuttallii, also known as the sego lily, is a bulbous perennial plant that is endemic to the Western United States. The common name of sego comes from a similar Shoshone word. It is the state flower of Utah.

== Distribution and habitat ==
The plant is native to a number of western states, being found throughout Utah and Wyoming, large parts of eastern Nevada, and parts of Idaho, Montana, North Dakota, South Dakota, Nebraska, Colorado, Arizona, and New Mexico. It grows in dry, brushy or grassy slopes and desert high country.

== Description ==
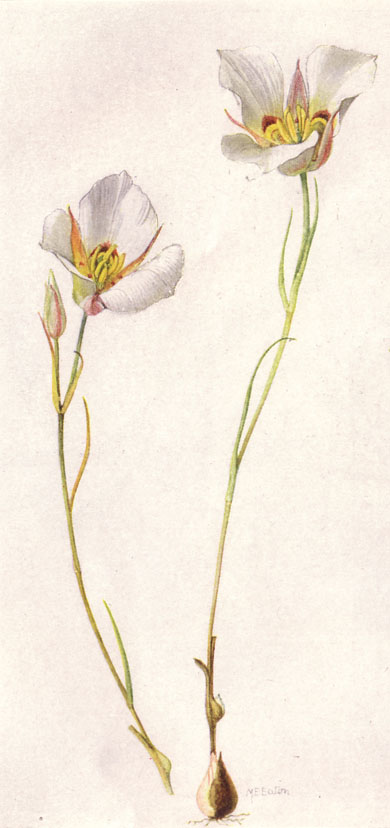
Painting by Mary E. Eaton

Calochortus nuttallii are around 15–45 cm (6–18 inches) in height and have linear leaves.

Plants have one to four flowers, each with three white petals (and three sepals) which are tinged with lilac (occasionally magenta) and have a purplish band radiating from the yellow base. A yellow petaled form with deep purple bands is known from Petrified Forest National Park. The yellow petaled form was also observed in a "super bloom" near the Orange Cliffs District of Glen Canyon National Recreation Area, on the north side of the Colorado River near Hite, Utah in May 2019. The plant blooms in early summer, with flowers that can be up to 3 inches across.

=== Taxonomy ===
Calochortus nuttallii is a species within the genus Calochortus, in a sub-group generally referred to as Mariposa Lilies. The specific epithet nuttallii, named for the English botanist and zoologist, Thomas Nuttall, was ascribed to the species by the American botanists John Torrey and Asa Gray when it was officially described in 1857.

==== Former varieties ====
A number of former varieties of Calochortus nuttallii have been reclassified as distinct species:

- Calochortus nuttallii var. aureus (S.Watson) Ownbey is currently Calochortus aureus S.Watson
- Calochortus nuttallii var. australis Munz is currently Calochortus invenustus Greene
- Calochortus nuttallii var. bruneaunis (A.Nelson & J.F.Macbr.) Ownbey is currently Calochortus bruneaunsis A.Nelson & J.F.Macbr.
- Calochortus nuttallii var. leichtlinii (Hook.f.) Smiley is currently Calochortus leichtlinii Hook.f.
- Calochortus nuttallii var. panamintensis Ownbey is currently Calochortus panamintensis (Ownbey) Reveal
- Calochortus nuttallii var. subalpinus M.E.Jones is currently Calochortus leichtlinii Hook.f.

=== Names ===
The common name "sego lily" is believed to be derived from a Shoshoni language word for the species, sikoo.

== Uses ==
=== Culinary ===
Native Americans had culinary uses for the bulbs, seeds, and flowers of the plant. Bulbs were roasted, boiled, or made into a porridge by the Hopi, Havasupai, Navajo, Southern Paiute, Gosiute, and Ute peoples. The Hopi used the yellow flower ceremonially.

The Shoshone taught the Mormon pioneers to use the bulb for badly needed food, which resulted in the sego lily being formally designated as the Utah State Flower in 1911. Sego is derived from the Shoshone word seego. The sego lily was commemorated by the Sego Lily Dam, a flood-prevention infrastructure project in the shape of a giant sego lily, built in Sugar House Park in Salt Lake City in 2017.

The USDA Natural Resources Conservation Service strongly cautions foragers that many highly toxic plants commonly called deathcamas grow in the same habitat as Calochortus nuttallii and can be easily confused with it when flowers are not present.

=== Cultivation ===
Calochortus nuttallii is cultivated as an ornamental plant for its attractive tulip-shaped flowers and to attract/support native pollinator species. They are intolerant of excessive water, both in dormancy and while growing. To support healthy growth they need a well drained soil, but not excessively sandy with very little organic matter. In relatively dry climates sego lilies accept either part shade or full sun conditions. Plants can be propagated from newly formed bulblets which take two years to flower. In climates with more rainfall than its native habitat additional measures to protect the bulbs from rotting are critical. The writer Claude A. Barr found that 8 centimeters or more of gravel no more than 7.5 centimeters under the bulbs remedied this problem.

== In official flags ==
In May 2020, the Salt Lake City, Utah government opened a two-month contest to redesign its flag. This is the fourth flag in the history of the city. The winning design, called the Sego Flag (sego lily being another name for Calochortus nuttallii), was announced in September 2020, and was created through the merger of two finalists created by Arianna Meinking and Elio Kennedy-Yoon from West High School. The design features a sego lily, which is the Utah state flower, in the canton amidst horizontal fields of blue and white. Three sego petals in the flag refer to the fact that Salt Lake City is the only state capital with a three-word name. The golden center of the sego is intended to symbolize the future of the city. The design was sent to the city council for consideration with the endorsement of mayor Erin Mendenhall and adopted on October 6, 2020.

In May 2025 the Salt Lake City council approved mayor Erin Mendenhall's designs for three new city flags:

- the Sego Celebration Flag, based on the Juneteenth flag;
- the Sego Belonging Flag, based on the Progress Pride flag;
- and the Sego Visibility Flag, based on the transgender pride flag.

Each is identical to the flag it was based on, except for the addition of a sego lily in the canton. The new flags were adopted in response to a new state law restricting the flying of the flags they were based on.

Official flags with Calochortus nuttallii, also known as the sego lily, on them

The flag of Salt Lake City, called the Sego Flag, adopted in 2020

Sego Belonging Flag, adopted in 2025

Sego Visibility Flag, adopted in 2025
