= Ellen Powell Thompson =

American teacher and botanist (1840-1911)

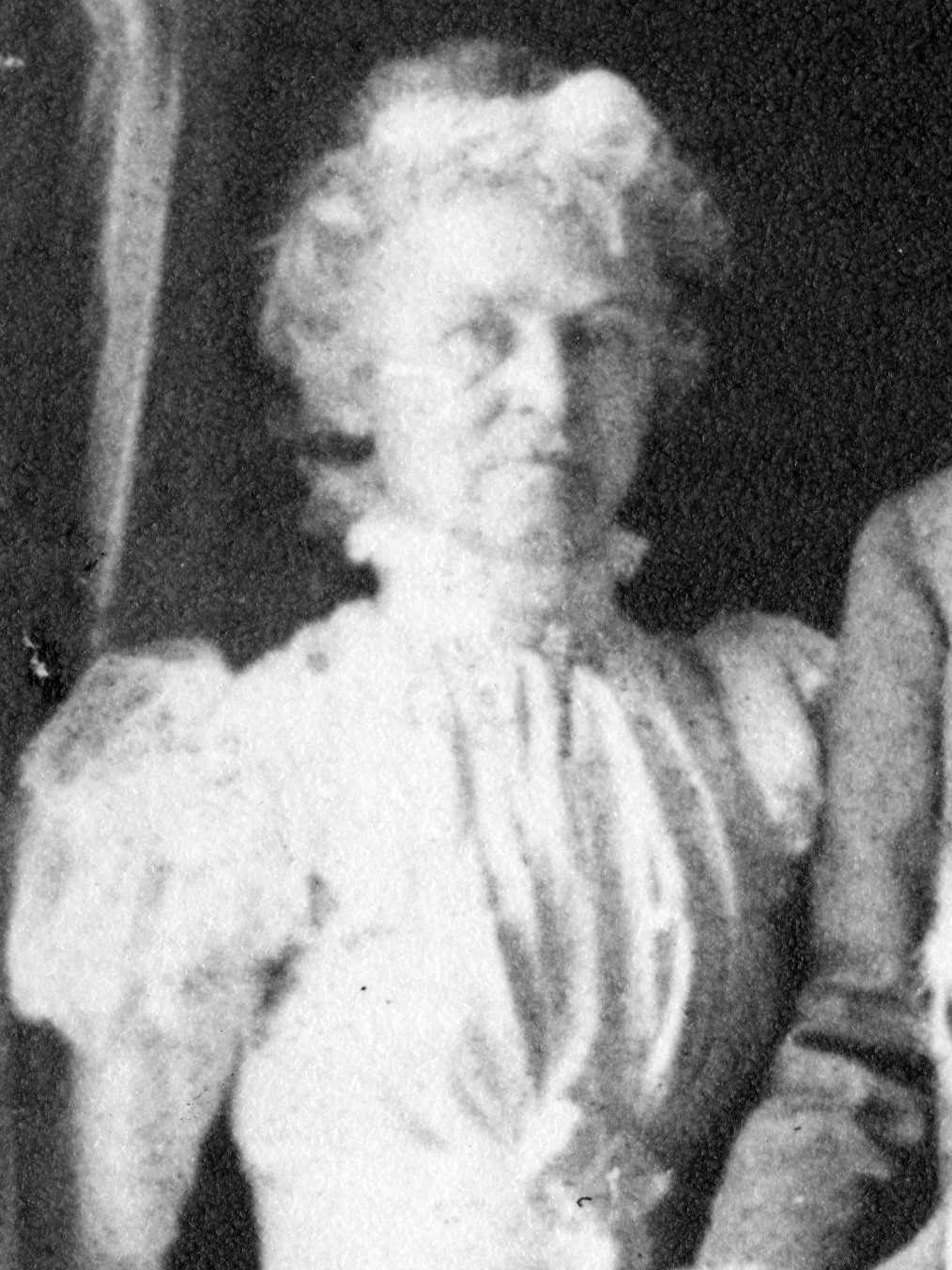
- Ellen Powell Thompson, c. 1900
- Born: 1840
- Died: 1911 (aged 70–71)
- Education: Wheaton College

Ellen Louella (Nellie) Powell Thompson (1840–1911) was an American naturalist and botanist, and an active advocate for women's suffrage.

== Life ==
Ellen Louella (Nellie) Powell was born in Ohio to parents of English origin. Her siblings included John Wesley Powell, best known for explorations of the American West and leadership of the early US Geological Survey. Another brother was William P. Powell, superintendent of Washington D.C. public schools. She had several sisters, one of whom was the wife of Congressman John Davis of Kansas, and mother of the scientist Arthur Powell Davis.

In the mid-1850s, she attended Wheaton College in Wheaton, Illinois. She taught school from the age of 16.

On July 8, 1862 in Wheaton, Illinois, she married professor and geographer Almon Harris Thompson, a colleague and friend of her brother John. During her marriage, Thompson continued to work as a teacher, and assumed her husband's position as superintendent of schools when he joined the army. She spent her 1863 summer vacation at Cairo, Illinois, caring for sick and wounded soldiers from the American Civil War.

Thompson accompanied her husband on expeditions to map the western United States. During this period, she made friends with members of a number of Native American tribes, learning the language of the "Pah Utes" and studying their customs. Thompson was a founding member of the Women's Anthropological Society of America, Washington DC.

The Thompsons had no children.

Thompson died of heart failure, at home while "engaged in household duties", on March 12, 1911. She is buried in Arlington National Cemetery.

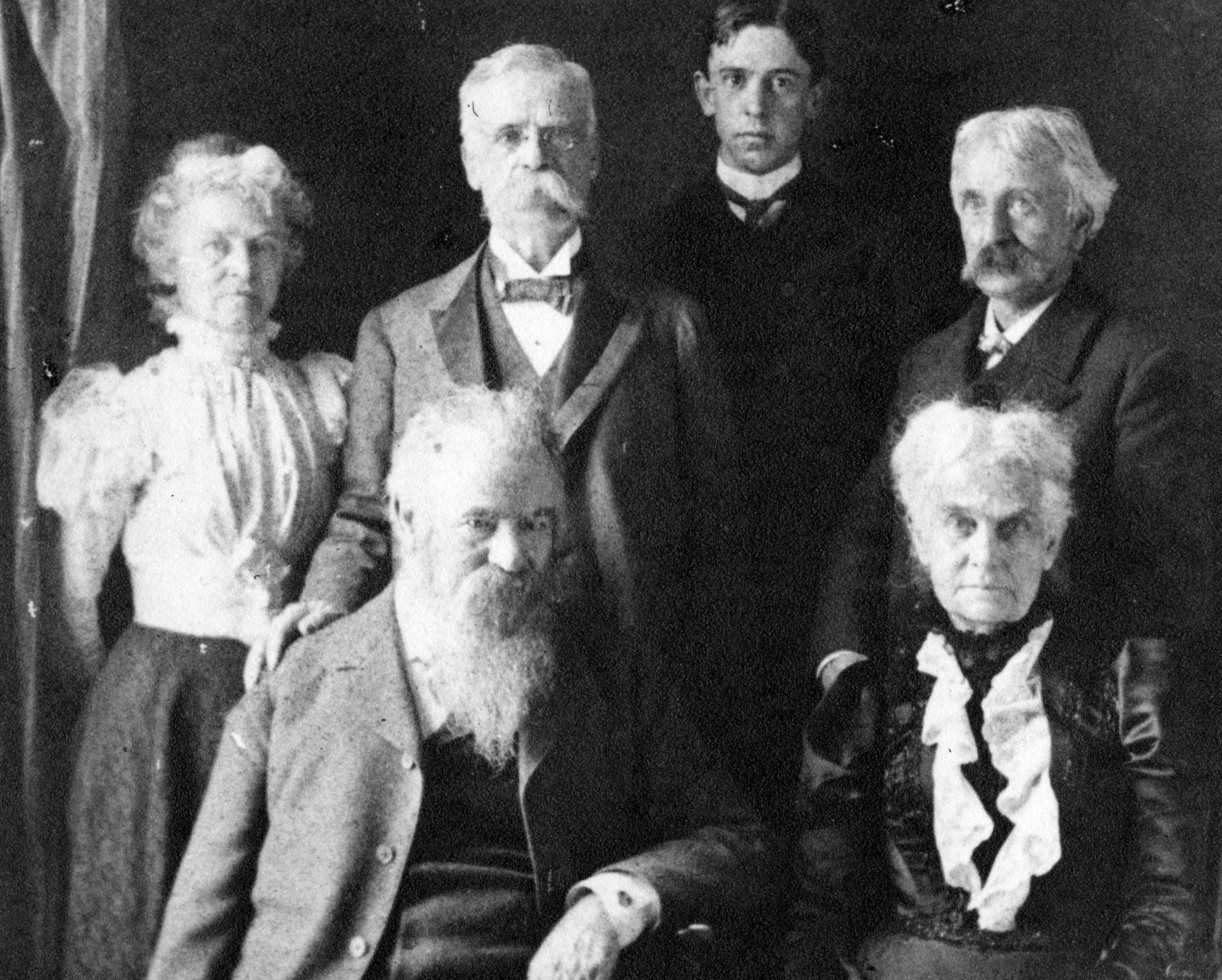
Powell family: Back row, left to right: Ellen Powell Thompson, William Bramwell Powell, William (Billy) P. Powell, Almon Harris Thompson. Front row: John Wesley Powell and Mary Powell Wheeler. Topeka, Kansas, circa 1900.

== Botany ==
Thompson joined John Wesley Powell's second Colorado River expedition during their 1872 winter camp near Kanab, Utah, serving as botanist. Her husband Almon Harris Thompson was second in command. She collected plants primarily in the Kanab area, although collecting excursions were also made through southern Utah and northern Arizona. She collected 385 specimens, 15 of which would become type specimens for new taxa.

Every three months, Thompson sent her collections of dried pressed plants to Dr Asa Gray at Harvard University. Many of these specimens reside at the Gray Herbarium, part of Harvard University Herbaria. Some were deposited in the United States National Herbarium in Washington D.C., and others in scattered herbaria across the country.

Thompson also liked to paint, and her home was decorated with many botanical illustrations.

=== Botanical legacy ===
Thompson is commemorated in the names of the following plant taxa, which were described as new to science based on specimens she collected in 1872 on John Wesley Powell's second Colorado River expedition:

- Astragalus mollissimus thompsoniae (Astragalus thompsoniae) – Thompson's woolly milkvetch
- Eriogonum thompsoniae thompsoniae – Thompson's buckwheat
- Penstemon thompsoniae (Penstemon pumilus thompsoniae) – Thompson's penstemon
- Peteria thompsoniae – Thompson's spine-noded milkvetch
- Psorothamnus thompsoniae (Parosela thompsoniae) – Thompson's Dalea

Additional plant taxa described as new to science based on specimens she collected on the 1872 expedition include the following:

- Androstephium breviflorum – Pink Funnel Lily
- Astragalus ampullarius – Gumbo Milk-vetch
- Calochortus aureus (Calochortus nuttallii aureus) – Golden Mariposa Lily
- Calochortus flexuosus – Winding Mariposa Lily
- Chylismia multijuga (Oenothera multijuga) – Froststem Suncup
- Dalea flavescens (Petalostemon flavescens) – Canyonlands Prairieclover
- Erigeron utahensis (Erigeron stenophyllus tetrapleuris) – Utah Fleabane
- Fendlerella utahensis (Whipplea utahensis) – Utah Fendlerbush, Yerba Desierto
- Mirabilis glabra (Oxybaphus glaber) – Smooth Four-o'clock
- Psathyrotes pilifera – Hairybeast Turtleback
- Psilostrophe sparsiflora (Riddellia tagetina sparsiflora) – Greenstem Paperflower

== Political activism ==
Thompson was active in the woman's suffrage movement in the 1890s, and was known across the United States as a colleague of Elizabeth Cady Stanton and Susan B. Anthony. Thompson was elected President of the Women's District Suffrage Association on October 10, 1895, and again in 1897. She was also a founding member of the Equal Suffrage Association of the District of Columbia.

In 1900, Thompson was the chair of the national convention, which ended with a celebration of Susan Anthony's 80th birthday, and retirement from the Presidency of the National Association. Thompson was active in securing a gift of $200 for Anthony.
