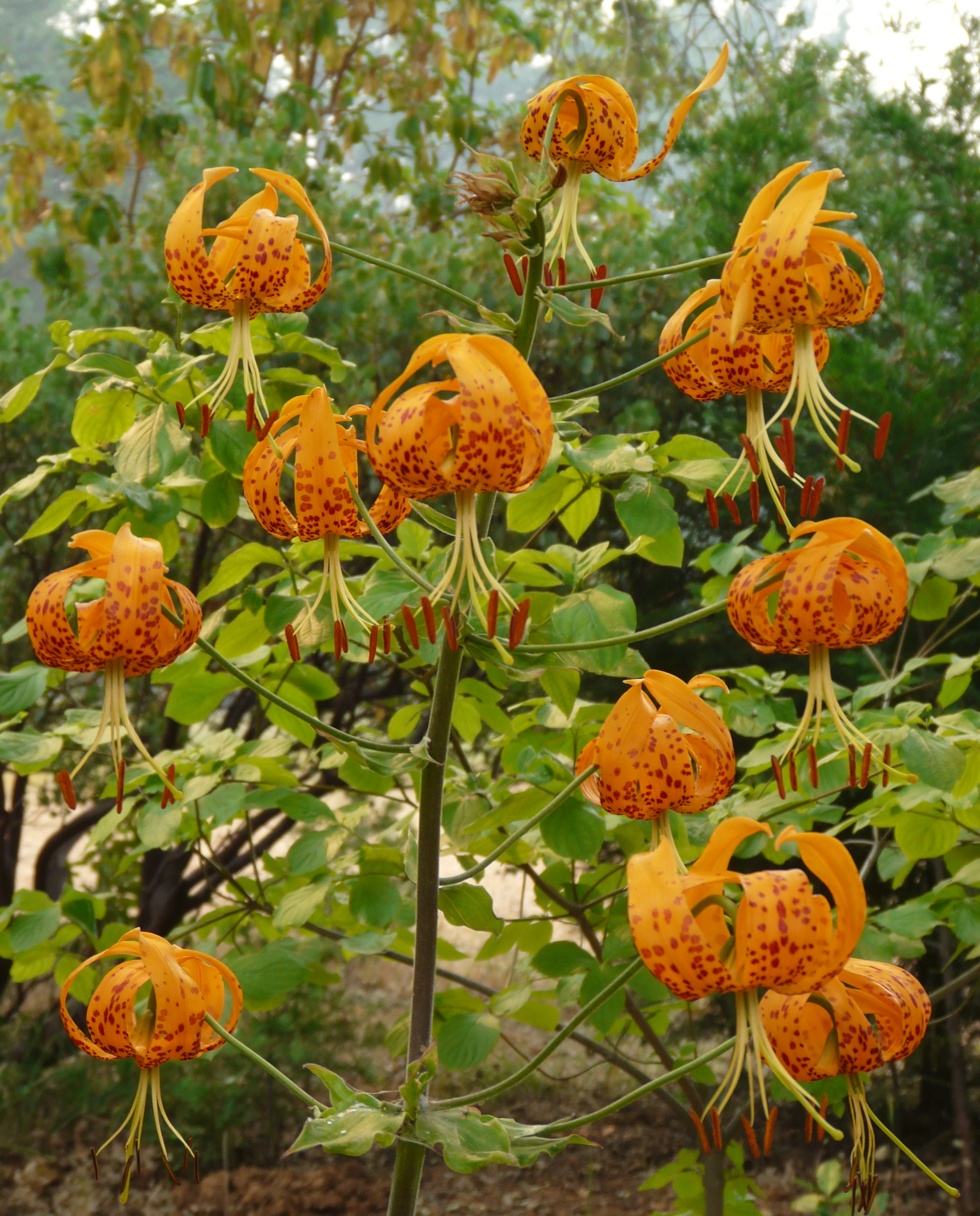

Scientific classification
- Kingdom: Plantae
- Clade: Tracheophytes
- Clade: Angiosperms
- Clade: Monocots
- Order: Liliales
- Family: Liliaceae
- Subfamily: Lilioideae
- Tribe: Lilieae
- Genus: Lilium
- Species: L. humboldtii

Binomial name
- Lilium humboldtii Roezl & Leichtlin, 1871

Synonyms
- Synonymy: Lilium canadense var. puberulum Torr., Pacif. Railr. Rep. Parke, Bot. 4(5; 4): 146 (1857).; Lilium puberulum (Torr.) Duch., J. Soc. Natl. Hort. Paris, sér. 2, 4: 217 (1870).; Lilium canadense var. humboldtii Baker, Gard. Chron. 1871: 1165 (1871).; Lilium bloomerianum Kellogg, Proc. Calif. Acad. Sci. 4: 160 (1872).; Lilium robinsonianum Baker, J. Linn. Soc., Bot. 14: 244 (1874).; Lilium humboldtii var. bloomerianum (Kellogg) Jeps. 1921, illegitimate name; Lilium humboldtii var. bloomerianum Purdy< 1901, illegitimate name (syn of L.h. subsp. ocellatum); Lilium bloomerianum var. ocellatum Kellogg (syn of L.h. subsp. ocellatum); Lilium humboldtii var. ocellatum (Kellogg) Elwes (syn of L.h. subsp. ocellatum); Lilium ocellatum (Kellogg) Beane (syn of L.h. subsp. ocellatum); Lilium bloomerianum Purdy illegitimate name (syn of L.h. subsp. ocellatum); Lilium humboldtii var. bloomerianum Purdy (syn of L.h. subsp. ocellatum); Lilium humboldtii var. magnificum Purdy (syn of L.h. subsp. ocellatum); Lilium fairchildii M.E.Jones (syn of L.h. subsp. ocellatum)

= Lilium humboldtii =

Species of lily

Lilium humboldtii, or Humboldt's lily, is a species of lily native to the US state of California and the Mexican state of Baja California. It is named after naturalist and explorer Alexander von Humboldt. It is native to the South High Cascade Range, High Sierra Nevada, south Outer South Coast Ranges, and the Santa Monica Mountains and others in Southern California, growing at elevations from 600 metres (2,000 ft) to 1,200 metres (3,900 ft).

== Description ==
Lilium humboldtii grows up to 6 feet (1.8 m) tall, with flowers that are maroon-spotted, golden-orange with dark red splotches, with orange to brown stamens. The plant flowers in June, with flowers growing in a pyramidal inflorescence. The flowers are on stout stems, which are sometimes brown-purple. The subrhizomatous bulb is large, with yellowish-white scales, and grows very deep in the soil. The leaves grow in whorls, and are undulate, shiny, and oblanceolate. It is summer-deciduous, dying back after flowering in mid- to late summer.

Subspecies

- Lilium humboldtii subsp. humboldtii - central California
- Lilium humboldtii subsp. ocellatum - southern California, Baja California

Both subspecies are on the California Native Plant Society Inventory of Rare and Endangered Plants of California and described as "fairly endangered in California".

Albert Kellogg, unaware that the plant had already been named by Roezl and Leichtlin, gave it the name Lilium bloomerianum. For some time afterward, the name was still applied to the southern California Lilium humboldtii subsp. ocellatum.

== Cultivation ==
Lilium humboldtii is sold as a garden bulb. It prefers dry summer dormancy, with no water after blooming, good drainage, and part shade. It was one of the parents, along with Lilium pardalinum, that produced the Bellingham hybrid lilies, which eventually resulted in the popular 'Shuksan' and 'Star of Oregon' lilies.
