= Fendlerbush =

Fendlerbush may refer to:

- Fendlera
- Fendlerella, Utah fendlerbush
