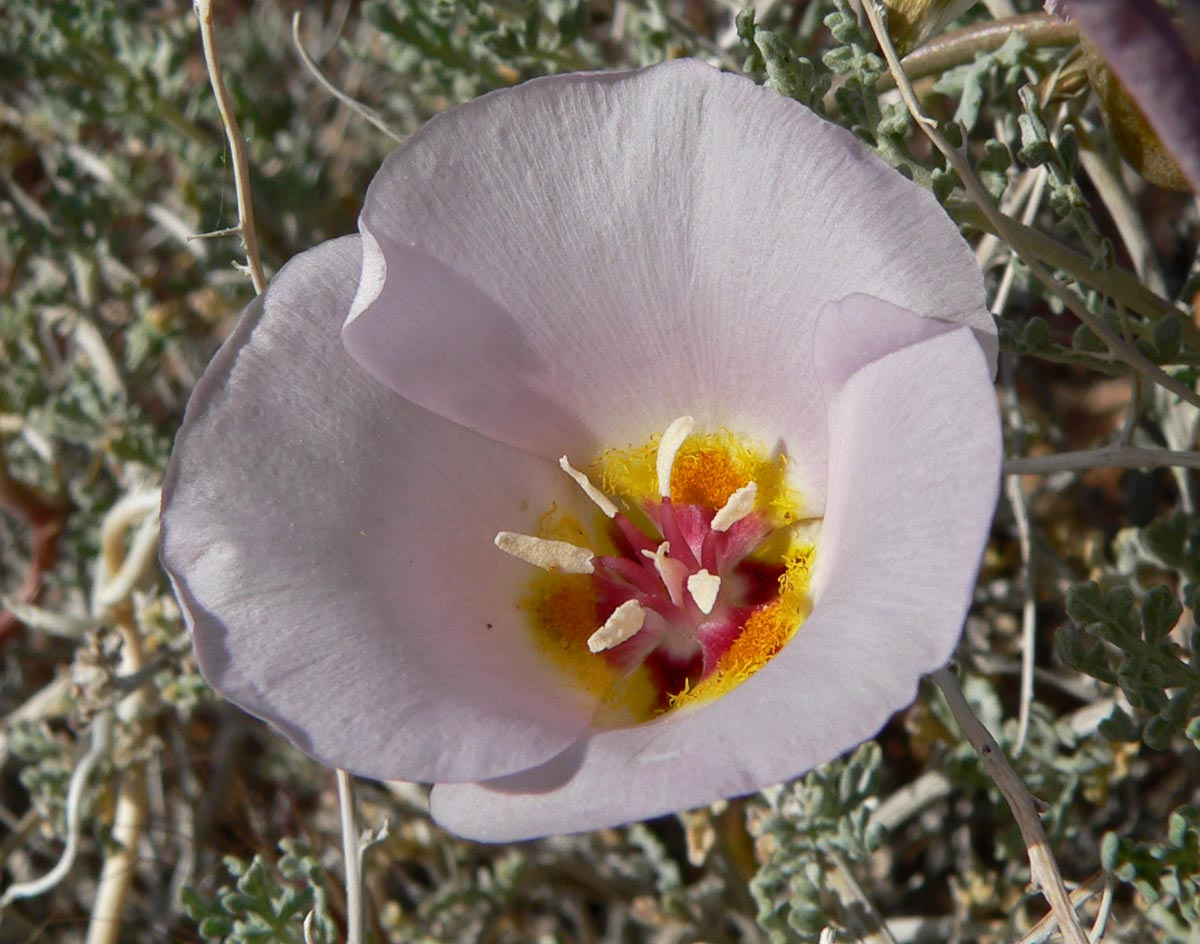

Conservation status
- Apparently Secure (NatureServe)

Scientific classification
- Kingdom: Plantae
- Clade: Embryophytes
- Clade: Tracheophytes
- Clade: Spermatophytes
- Clade: Angiosperms
- Clade: Monocots
- Order: Liliales
- Family: Liliaceae
- Genus: Calochortus
- Species: C. flexuosus

Binomial name
- Calochortus flexuosus S.Watson

= Calochortus flexuosus =

Plant species in the lily family

Calochortus flexuosus is a species of lily known by the common names winding Mariposa lily and straggling Mariposa lily.

This is a bulbous perennial wildflower native to the Southwestern United States, the Mojave Desert in California, and northern Mexico. It is most often found in desert scrub, growing up through low shrubs.

== Description ==
Calochortus flexuosus has one long naked stem with only one or two small leaves toward the base. The stem may branch and is usually winding and bent or curving.

At the end of the stem there is a showy flower. It has shades of pink or lavender to white. The base of each petal is solid yellow with white and red stripes or spots.

== Taxonomy ==
The species is classified in the Calochortus genus in the Liliaceae family. It has no subspecies, varieties or botanical synonyms. Calochortus flexuosus was published as a new species by Sereno Watson in 1873, based on material collected by Ellen Powell Thompson in 1872 in the vicinity of Kanab, Utah, during the US Topographical and Geological Survey of the Colorado River (led by John Wesley Powell). This specimen, the holotype, resides in the United States National Herbarium (US).

== Range ==
Straggling Mariposa lilies grow in northwestern Mexico and the southwestern United States. In Mexico they are known from the states of Baja California and Sonora. In the US they are native to six states, California, Nevada, Arizona, Utah, New Mexico, and Colorado.
