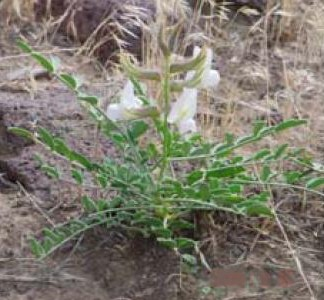

Scientific classification
- Kingdom: Plantae
- Clade: Tracheophytes
- Clade: Angiosperms
- Clade: Eudicots
- Clade: Rosids
- Order: Fabales
- Family: Fabaceae
- Subfamily: Faboideae
- Genus: Peteria
- Species: P. thompsoniae

Binomial name
- Peteria thompsoniae S.Watson

= Peteria thompsoniae =

Species of legume

Peteria thompsoniae is a species of flowering plant in the family Fabaceae known by the common names spine-noded milkvetch and Thompson's peteria. It is native to the western United States, where it grows in salt desert shrublands in soils of volcanic ash origin, and in alluvial fans. It is a spiny perennial herb growing from a taproot and rhizome system, its stem growing 20 to 60 centimeters tall. The leaves are made up of several pairs of oval leaflets. The inflorescence, a spikelike raceme at the top of the stem, produces white or pinkish pealike flowers up to 2.5 centimeters long, its base encapsulated in a tubular calyx of glandular sepals. The fruit is a leathery, slightly inflated legume pod up to 6 centimeters long.

== History ==
Peteria thompsoniae was published as a new species by Sereno Watson in 1873, based on material collected by Ellen Powell Thompson in 1872 in the vicinity of Kanab, Utah, during the US Topographical and Geological Survey of the Colorado River (led by John Wesley Powell). Her specimen, the holotype, is deposited at the Gray Herbarium.
