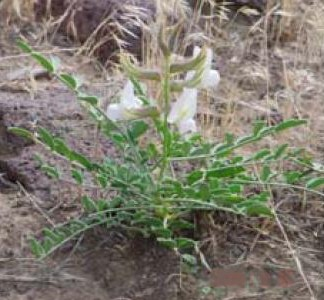
- Peteria thompsoniae

Scientific classification
- Kingdom: Plantae
- Clade: Tracheophytes
- Clade: Angiosperms
- Clade: Eudicots
- Clade: Rosids
- Order: Fabales
- Family: Fabaceae
- Subfamily: Faboideae
- Clade: Robinioids
- Tribe: Robinieae
- Genus: Peteria; A.Gray

Species
- 4, see text

= Peteria =

Genus of legumes

Peteria is a genus of flowering plants in the legume family, Fabaceae. It belongs to the subfamily Faboideae. It is native to USA and Mexico.

It is found in the American states of Arizona, California, Idaho, Nevada, New Mexico, Texas and Utah. As well as central, north-eastern and Mexico Gulf, in Mexico.

The genus name of Peteria is in honour of Robert Peter (1805–1894), an English-born American botanist, chemist, doctor, zoologist and geologist; founder of the University of Louisville School of Medicine.

The genus was circumscribed by Asa Gray in Smithsonian Contr. Knowl. vol.3 (Issue 5) on page 50 in 1852.

== Species ==
Plants of the World Online include;

- Peteria glandulosa (A.Gray ex S.Watson) Rydb.
- Peteria pinetorum Ced.Porter
- Peteria scoparia A.Gray
- Peteria thompsoniae S.Watson
