= Max Leichtlin =

German horticulturalist (1831–1910)

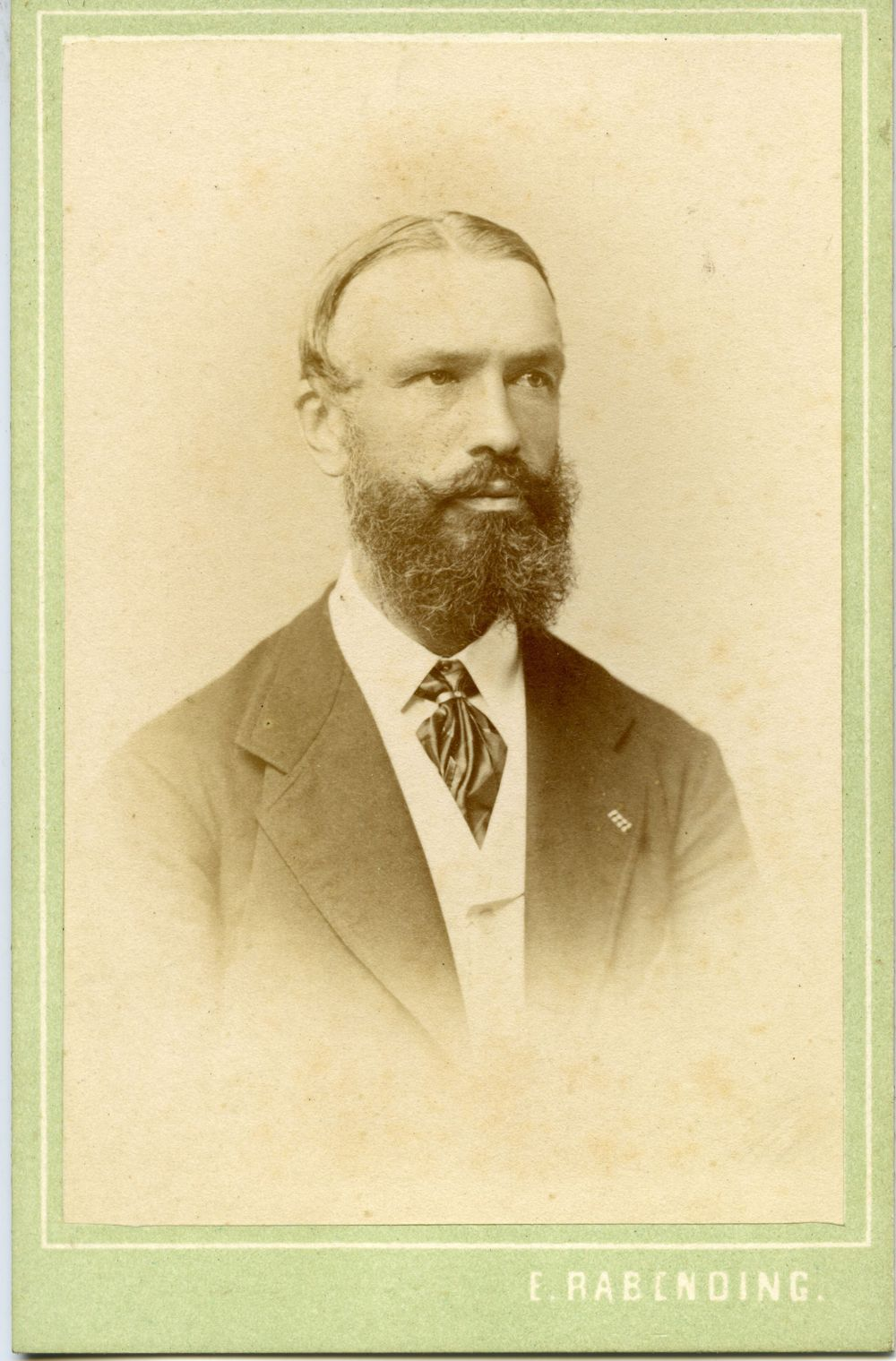
In 1875

Maximilian Leichtlin (20 October 1831, Karlsruhe – 3 September 1910, Baden-Baden) was a German horticulturalist. He took a special interest in lilies and irises.

Leichtlin was born in Karlsruhe and went to the polytechnic school. From 1846 he was trained as a gardener in Karlsruhe Botanical Garden and subsequently worked at several sites in Europe (including Frankfurt-am-Main, Bollweiler, Ghent, and the Royal School of Gardening at Potsdam), then spent several years engaged in travels. After returning from South America in 1856, he worked for two years at the Van Houtte nursery in Ghent. He then spent the next sixteen years working with his brothers in a paper manufacturing business. In 1873, he relocated to Baden-Baden, where he founded a botanical garden. He specialized in the cultivation and propagation of bulbous plants (lilies, tulips, irises and alliums).

Botanical taxa with the specific epithet of leichtlinii commemorate his name, two examples being, Camassia leichtlinii (great camas) and Calochortus leichtlinii (Leichtlin's mariposa).

== Associated writings ==
- Pflanzen-Sammlung des Leichtlin'schen Gartens in Baden-Baden (1873 –).
- "The plantsman of Baden : Maximilian Leichtlin 1831-1910", by Audrey Le Lievre.
