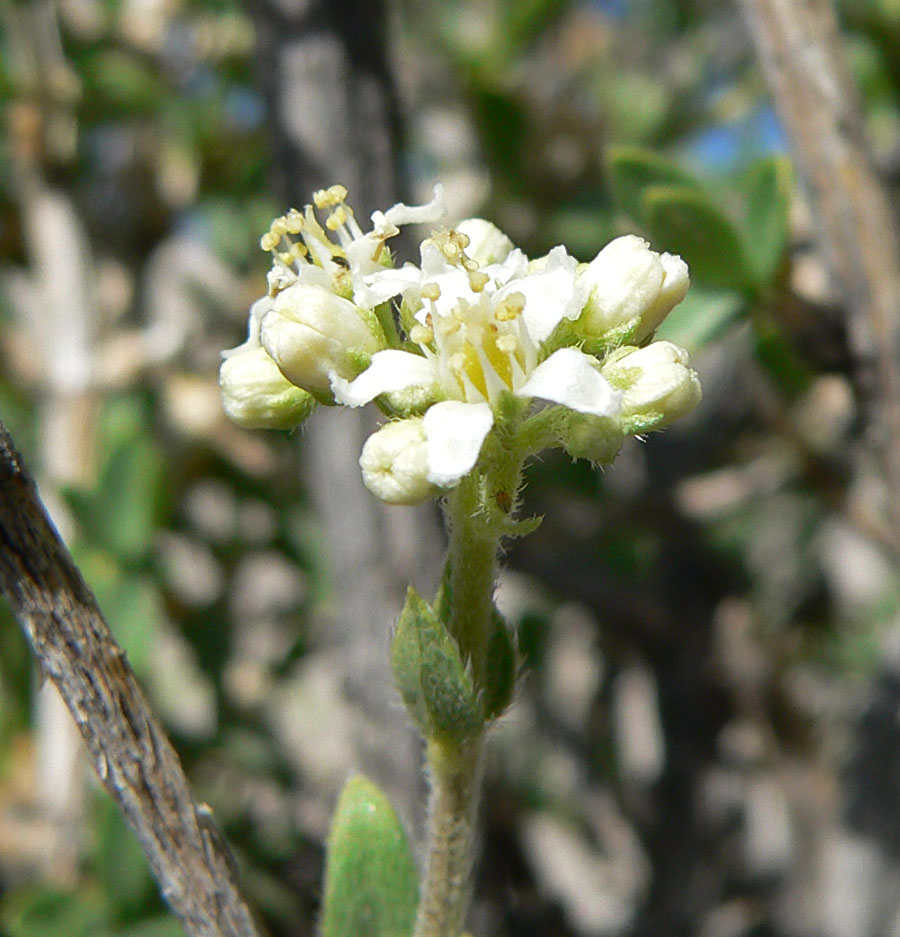
- Flowering Fendlerella utahensis in Turtlehead Peak, southern Nevada, USA

Scientific classification
- Kingdom: Plantae
- Clade: Tracheophytes
- Clade: Angiosperms
- Clade: Eudicots
- Clade: Asterids
- Order: Cornales
- Family: Hydrangeaceae
- Subfamily: Hydrangeoideae
- Tribe: Philadelpheae
- Genus: Fendlerella; A.Heller

Type species
- Fendlerella utahensis (S. Watson) A. Heller

Species
- Fendlerella lasiopetala Standl.; Fendlerella mexicana Brandegee; Fendlerella queretarana B.L.Turner; Fendlerella utahensis (S.Watson) A.Heller

= Fendlerella =

Genus of plants

Fendlerella is a genus of plants in the family Hydrangeaceae native to the region spanning from Colorado, USA to Northeast Mexico. It has four species.

== Taxonomy ==
=== Publication ===
The genus Fendlerella was first described by Amos Arthur Heller in 1898.

=== Species ===
The following species are accepted as of January 2024:

- Fendlerella lasiopetala Standl.
- Fendlerella mexicana Brandegee
- Fendlerella queretarana B.L.Turner
- Fendlerella utahensis (S.Watson) A.Heller

== Etymology ==
The species was named for Augustus Fendler in 1898.
