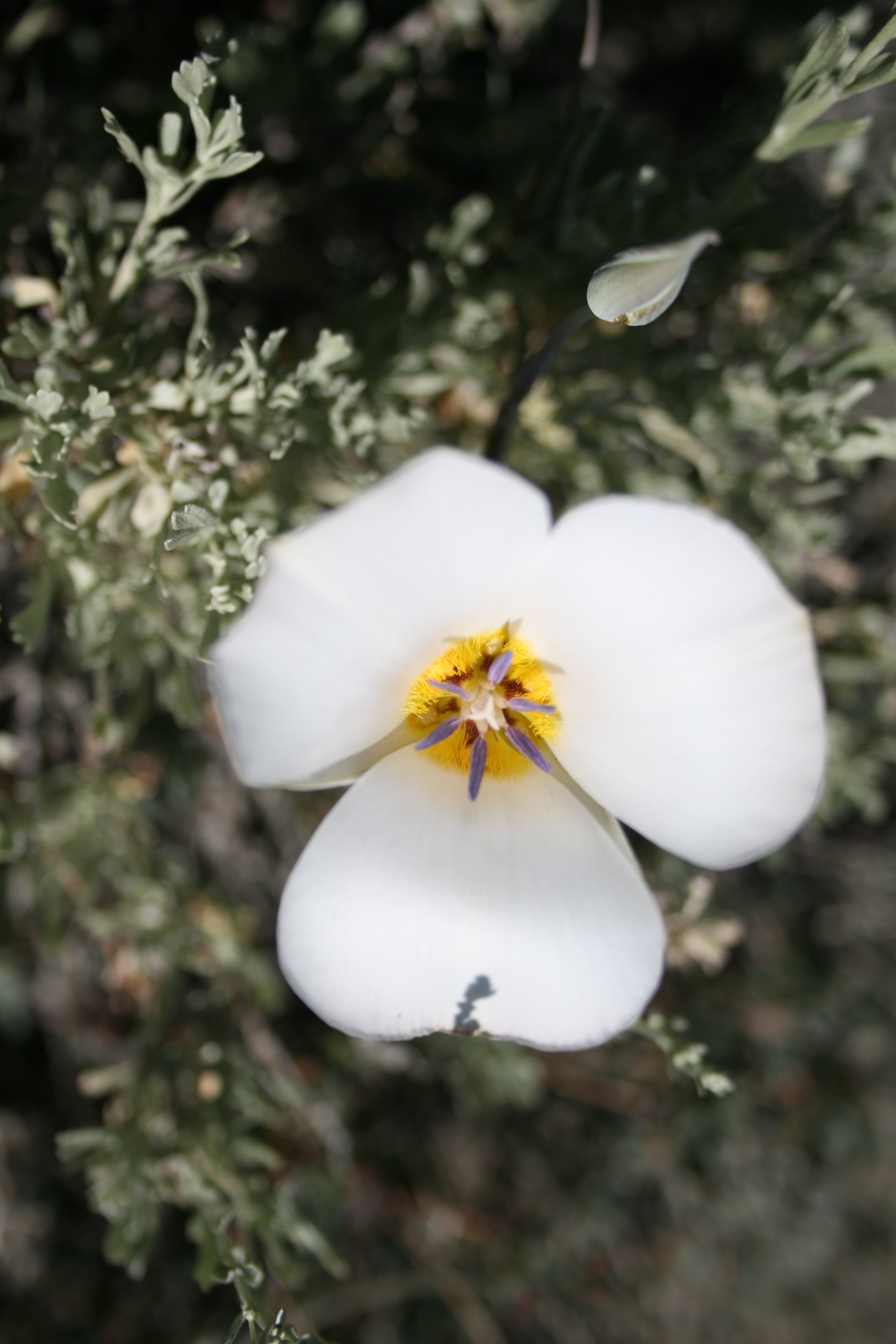

Conservation status
- Vulnerable (NatureServe)

Scientific classification
- Kingdom: Plantae
- Clade: Tracheophytes
- Clade: Angiosperms
- Clade: Monocots
- Order: Liliales
- Family: Liliaceae
- Genus: Calochortus
- Species: C. panamintensis

Binomial name
- Calochortus panamintensis (Ownbey) Reveal

Synonyms
- Calochortus nuttallii var. panamintensis Ownbey

= Calochortus panamintensis =

Species of flowering plant

Calochortus panamintensis is a rare North American species of flowering plants in the lily family known by the common name Panamint mariposa lily. It is native to Inyo and Kern Counties in California, plus adjacent Nye County, Nevada. It is named after the Panamint Range near Death Valley.

Calochortus panamintensis is a perennial herb producing an unbranching stem 40 to 60 centimeters tall. The basal leaf is 10 to 20 centimeters long and withers by flowering, and there may be smaller leaves along the stem. The inflorescence bears 1 to 4 erect, bell-shaped flowers with three sepals and three petals each up to 4 centimeters long. The sepals may have dark spotting near the bases, and the white to pale purple flowers may have a red and yellow blotch at the base and green striping on the outer surfaces. The fruit is a narrow capsule about 7 centimeters long. It grows in pinyon-juniper woodland.
