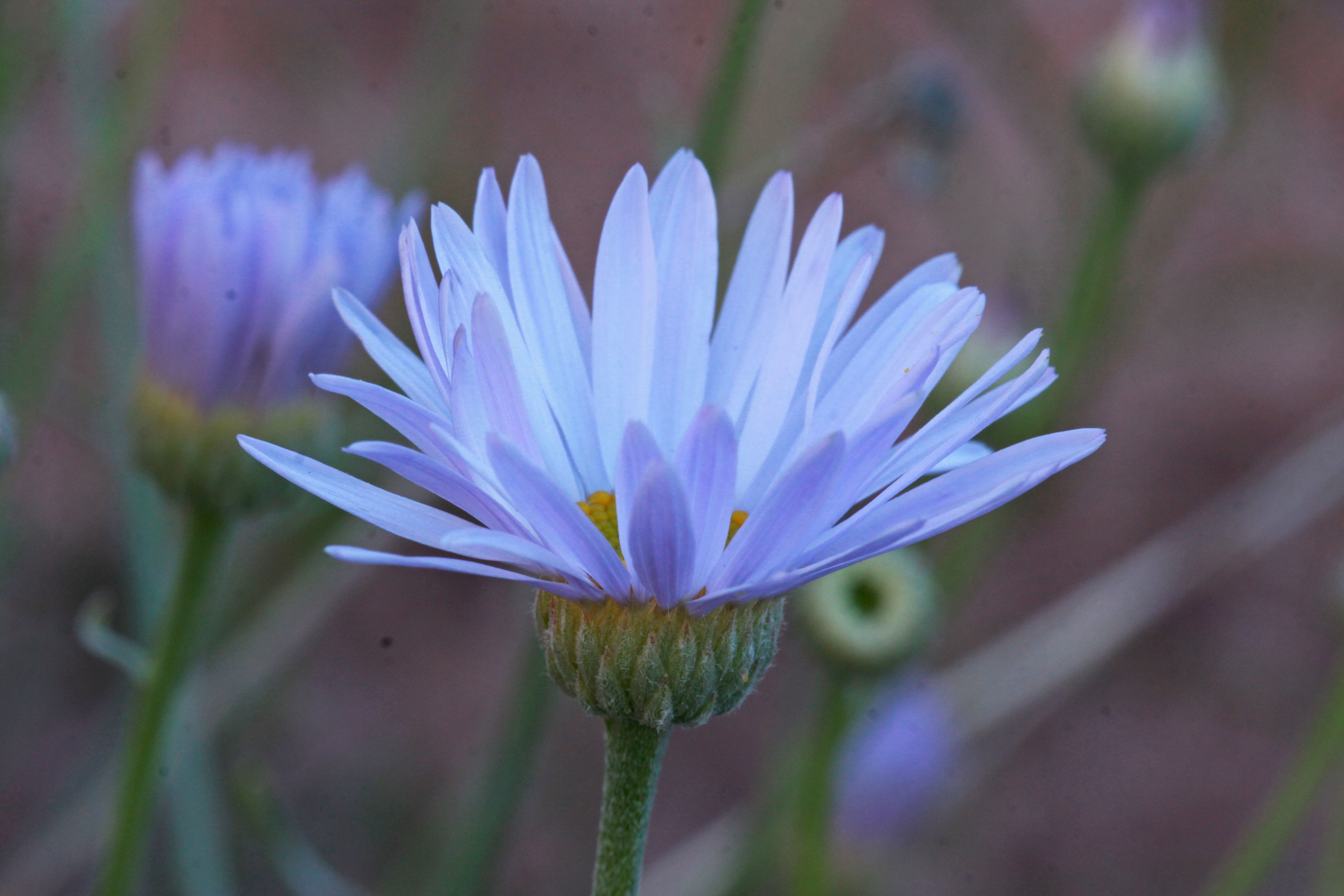

Conservation status
- Apparently Secure (NatureServe)

Scientific classification
- Kingdom: Plantae
- Clade: Tracheophytes
- Clade: Angiosperms
- Clade: Eudicots
- Clade: Asterids
- Order: Asterales
- Family: Asteraceae
- Genus: Erigeron
- Species: E. utahensis

Binomial name
- Erigeron utahensis A.Gray

Synonyms
- Erigeron stenophyllus A.Gray 1857 not Hook. & Arn. 1836; Erigeron stenophyllus var. tetrapleurus A.Gray; Erigeron tetrapleurus (A.Gray) A.Heller; Erigeron utahensis var. tetrapleuris (A.Gray) Cronquist

= Erigeron utahensis =

Species of flowering plant

Erigeron utahensis is a North American species of flowering plant in the family Asteraceae known by the common name Utah fleabane.

Erigeron utahensis is native to the western United States in Arizona, Utah, western Colorado, northwestern New Mexico, and southeastern California (Providence Mountains inside Mojave National Preserve in San Bernardino County).

Erigeron utahensis is a perennial herb up to 60 cm (2 feet) tall, growing from a stout taproot and a branching underground caudex. Its branching stem and leaves are covered in whitish hairs. The inflorescence holds 1-5 flower heads, each 1-2 centimeters (0.4-0.8 inches) wide. They have yellow disc florets in the centers and 28–40 white, pink, lavender, or ray florets around the edges.
