= Fendlerella utahensis =

Conservation status
- Secure (NatureServe)

Scientific classification
- Kingdom: Plantae
- Clade: Tracheophytes
- Clade: Angiosperms
- Clade: Eudicots
- Clade: Asterids
- Order: Cornales
- Family: Hydrangeaceae
- Genus: Fendlerella
- Species: F. utahensis

Binomial name
- Fendlerella utahensis (S.Watson) A.Heller

Synonyms
- Fendlera utahensis (S.Watson) Greene; Fendlera cymosa Greene; Fendlerella cymosa (Greene) Wooton & Standl.; Fendlerella utahensis var. cymosa (Greene) Kearney & Peebles; Whipplea utahensis S.Watson

Species of flowering plant

Fendlerella utahensis is a species of flowering plant in the family Hydrangeaceae. Its common names are yerba desierto and Utah fendlerbush.

== Description ==
Fendlerella utahensis is a shrubby plant that produces small white five-petal flowers. Flowers have stamens that rim the inside of the plant and have thick white filaments and yellow anthers. Inner carpel is green.

== Range ==
Fendlerella utahensis is native to Arizona, eastern California, western Colorado, New Mexico, Nevada, Texas and Utah in the southwestern United States, and to northern Mexico.

== Habitat ==
Can be found in mixed desert scrub and pine forests.

== Taxonomy ==
The species was first described as Whipplea utahensis by Sereno Watson in 1873. In 1898 Amos Arthur Heller placed the species in genus Fendlerella as F. utahensis.

Two varieties, Fendlerella utahensis var. cymosa and Fendlerella utahensis var. utahensis, have been named. Plants of the World Online treats them as synonyms of the species.
