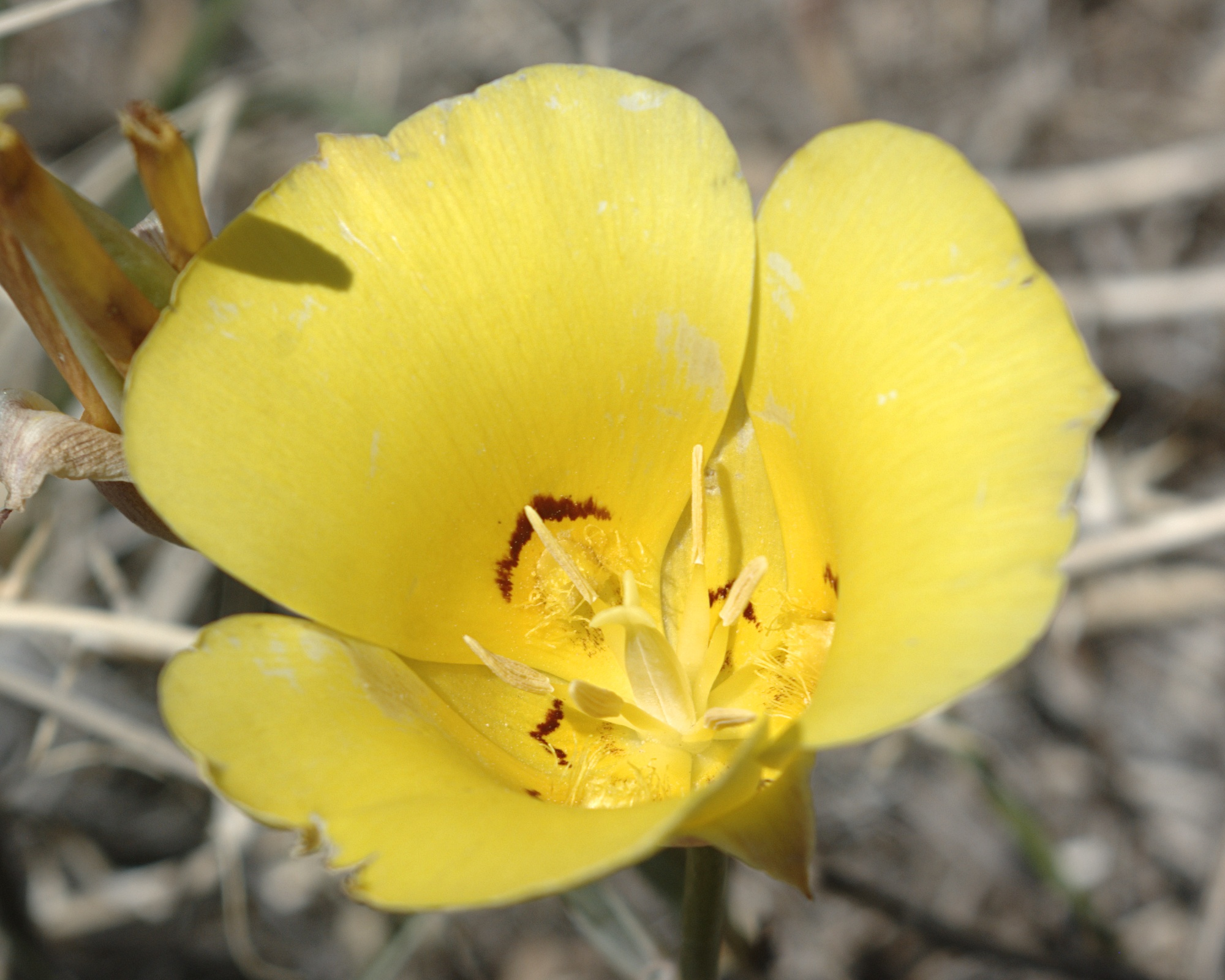
- Near Crystal Forest site in Petrified Forest National Park, Arizona

Conservation status
- Apparently Secure (NatureServe)

Scientific classification
- Kingdom: Plantae
- Clade: Tracheophytes
- Clade: Angiosperms
- Clade: Monocots
- Order: Liliales
- Family: Liliaceae
- Genus: Calochortus
- Species: C. aureus

Binomial name
- Calochortus aureus S.Watson

Synonyms
- Calochortus nuttallii var. aureus (S.Watson) Ownbey

= Calochortus aureus =

Plant species in the lily family

Calochortus aureus is a North American species of flowering plants in the lily family. It is native to the southwestern United States (Arizona, southern Utah, northwestern New Mexico and southwestern Colorado). Calochortus aureus is a bulb-forming perennial herb producing a single stalk up to 30 cm tall. Flowers are bright lemon-yellow with red or purple splotches on the petals.

== Taxonomy ==
The species is classified in the Calochortus genus in the family Liliaceae. It has no subspecies or varieties.

== History ==
Calochortus aureus was published by Sereno Watson in 1873, based on material collected by Ellen Powell Thompson in 1872 in the vicinity of Kanab, Utah, during the US Topographical and Geological Survey of the Colorado River (led by John Wesley Powell). Her specimen is deposited at the United States National Herbarium (US). It was later reclassified as Calochortus nuttallii var. aureus by Ownbey, but is now recognized as a full species, as originally described.
