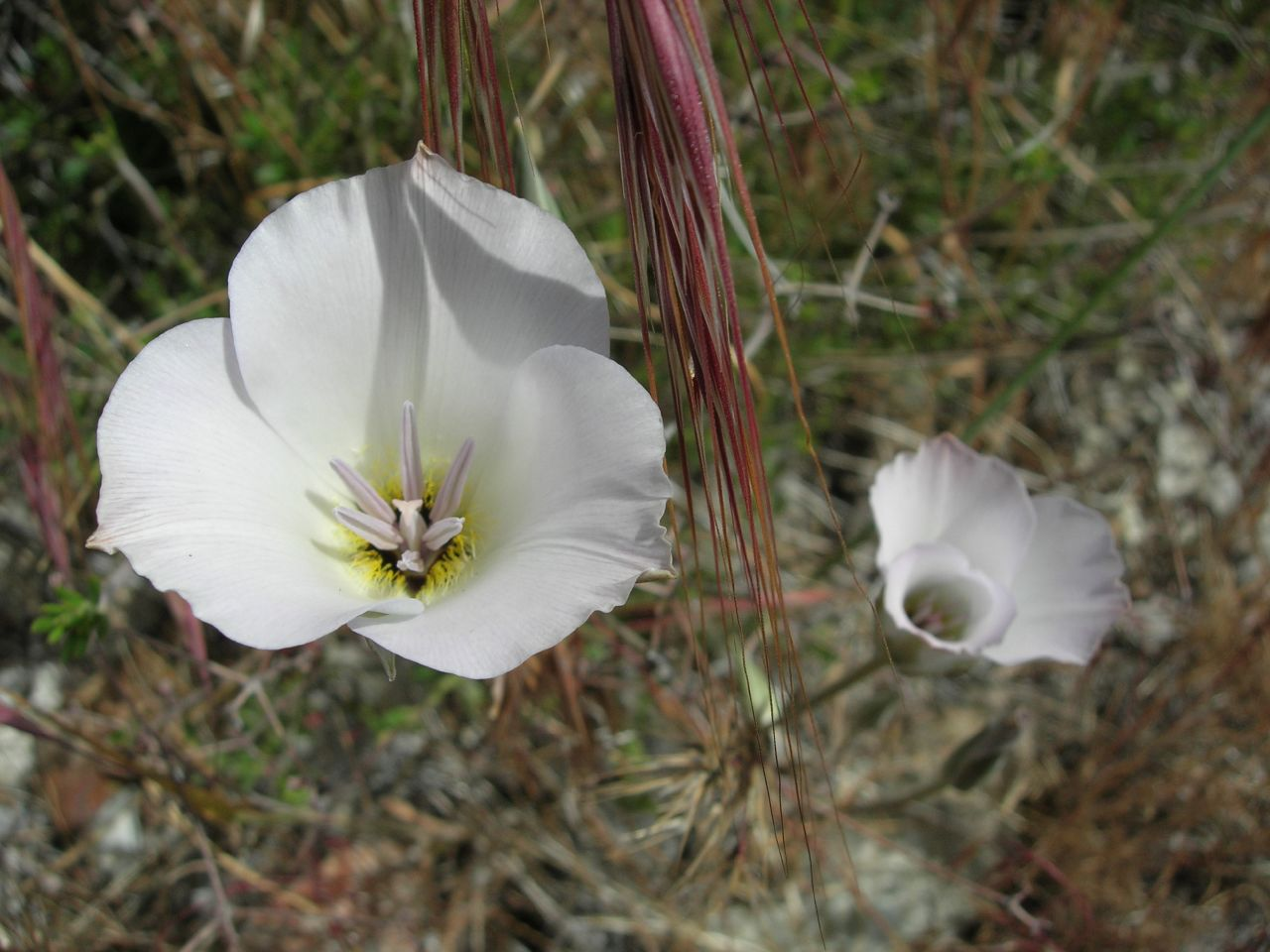

Scientific classification
- Kingdom: Plantae
- Clade: Tracheophytes
- Clade: Angiosperms
- Clade: Monocots
- Order: Liliales
- Family: Liliaceae
- Genus: Calochortus
- Species: C. invenustus

Binomial name
- Calochortus invenustus Greene

Synonyms
- Calochortus nuttallii var. australis Munz

= Calochortus invenustus =

Species of flowering plant

Calochortus invenustus is a species of flowering plant in the lily family known by the common names shy mariposa lily and plain mariposa lily.

It is native to the mountain ranges of central and southern California, where it grows in the coniferous forests. It has also been found in the Bodie Hills in Mineral County, Nevada.

== Description ==
Calochortus invenustus is a perennial herb which produces a slender, mostly unbranched stem up to 50 centimeters tall. There is a basal leaf 10 to 20 centimeters long which withers at flowering.

The inflorescence bears 1 to 6 erect bell-shaped flowers in a loose cluster. Each flower has three sepals and three petals which are usually white to light purple and may have spotting low at the base and greenish streaking on the outer surfaces.

The fruit is an angled capsule up to 7 centimeters long.
