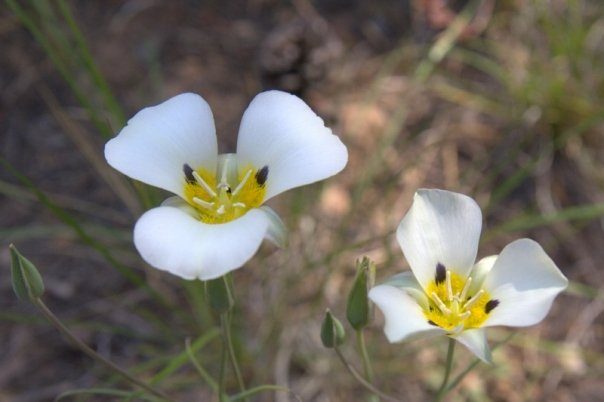

Conservation status
- Apparently Secure (NatureServe)

Scientific classification
- Kingdom: Plantae
- Clade: Tracheophytes
- Clade: Angiosperms
- Clade: Monocots
- Order: Liliales
- Family: Liliaceae
- Genus: Calochortus
- Species: C. leichtlinii

Binomial name
- Calochortus leichtlinii Hook.f.

Synonyms
- Calochortus nuttallii var. leichtlinii (Hook.f.) Smiley; Mariposa leichtlinii (Hook.f.) Hoover; Calochortus nuttallii var. subalpinus M.E.Jones

= Calochortus leichtlinii =

Species of flowering plant

Calochortus leichtlinii is a species of flowering plant in the lily family known by the common names Leichtlin's mariposa, smokey mariposa, and mariposa lily.

The plant is native to the Sierra Nevada and Modoc Plateau of California and adjacent parts of the Great Basin in southeastern Oregon and western Nevada. It grows in coniferous forest and chaparral habitats, including the lowest grassy hills—such as along the Sierra Nevada boundary with the Central Valley and agriculture.

The small underground bulbs were eaten by the Native Americans.

== Description ==
Calochortus leichtlinii is a perennial herb producing an erect, unbranching stem up to 60 centimeters tall. The basal leaf is 10 to 15 centimeters long and withers by flowering.

The inflorescence is a loose cluster of 1 to 5 erect, bell-shaped flowers. Each flower has three petals 1 to 4 centimeters long which are white, pinkish, or dull blue in color and spotted with yellow and dark red or black and hairy at the bases. These color patterns vary widely among different regional and local populations.

The fruit is a narrow capsule up to 6 centimeters long.

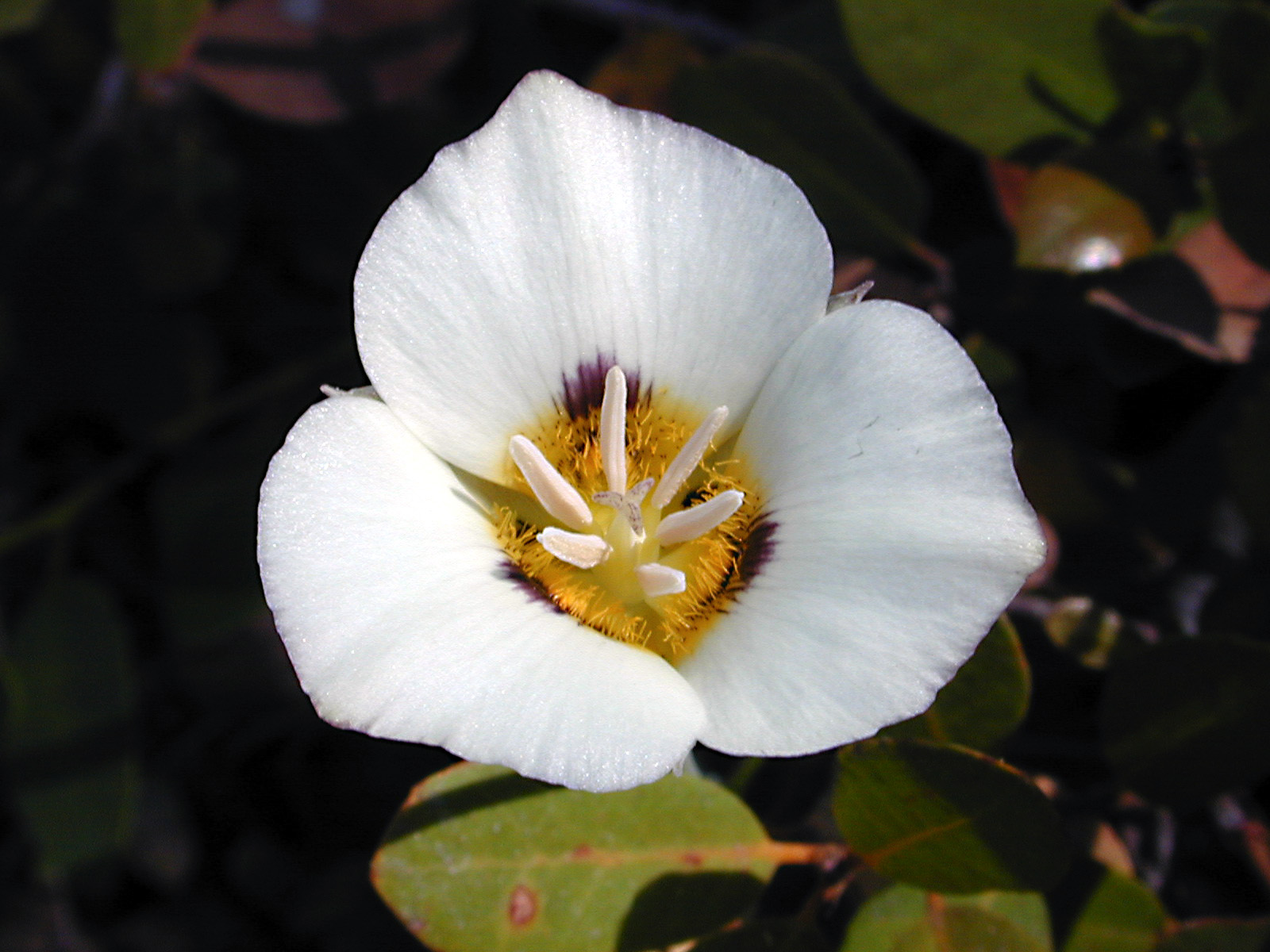
Leichtlin's mariposa Yosemite National Park

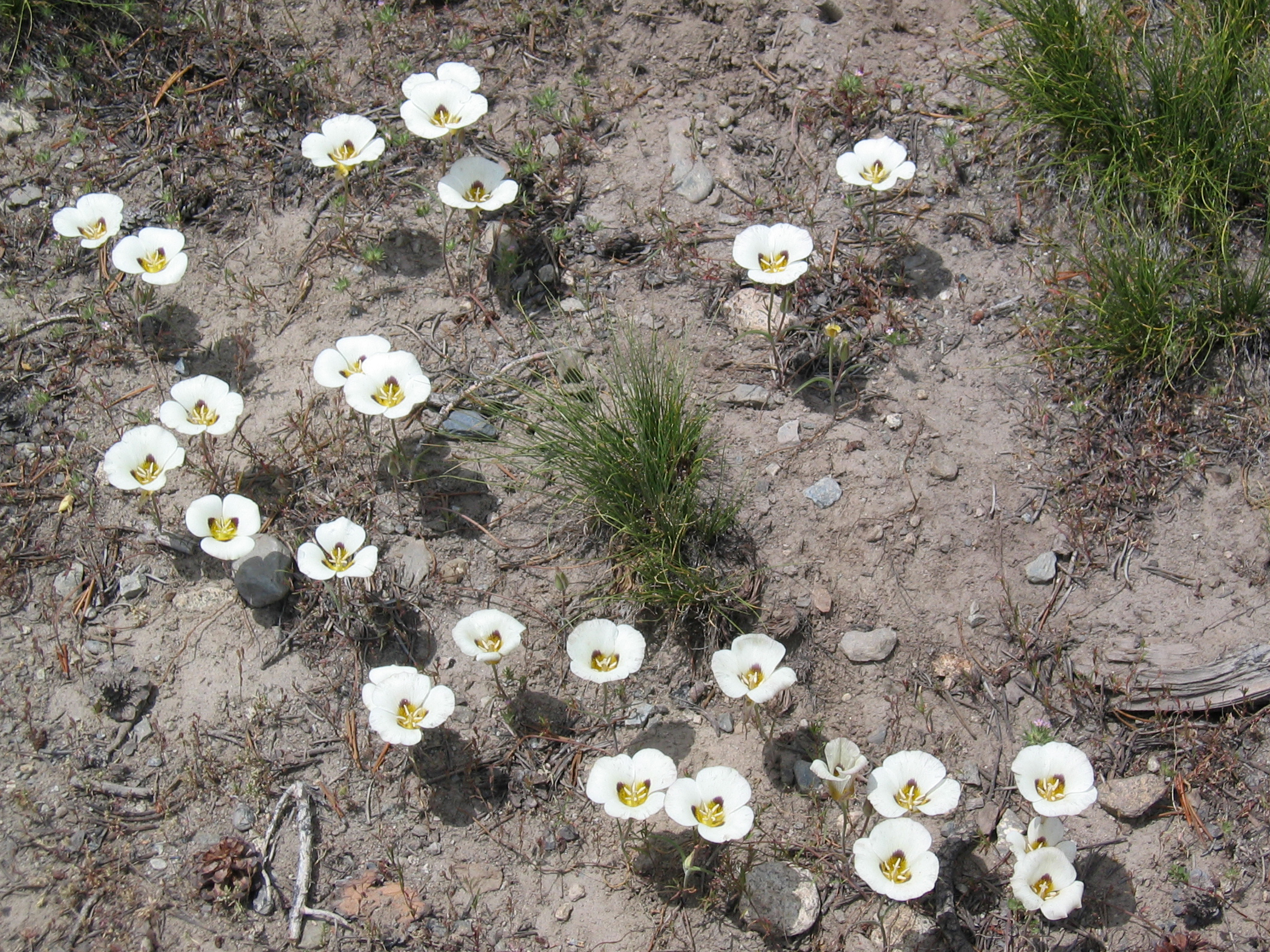
Drift of Calochortus leichtlinii flowers Ansel Adams Wilderness
